= Dranse =

Dranse may refer to:

- Dranse (Haute-Savoie), a French river in Haute-Savoie, that empties into Lake Geneva
  - Dranse d'Abondance, considered as the upper part of the Dranse in Haute-Savoie
  - Dranse de Morzine, a major tributary of the Dranse that begins in Morzine at the confluence of la dranse de sous le saix and la Dranse de la Manche
- La Drance, a river in Switzerland that flows through Martigny, that empties into the Rhone
  - Drance de Bagnes, a river in the Val de Bagnes in Valais, Switzerland, and the main tributary of La Drance (Valais) and an outflow of Lac de Mauvoisin
  - Drance d'Entremont, a river in the Val d'Entremont on the north side of the Great St Bernard Pass, and a main tributary of La Drance (Valais)
    - Drance de Ferret, a river in the Val Ferret in Valais, Switzerland and a tributary of the Drance d'Entremont

== See also ==
- Delta de la Dranse National Nature Reserve, a nature reserve at the mouth of Dranse in Haute-Savoie
