= Dranse (Haute-Savoie) =

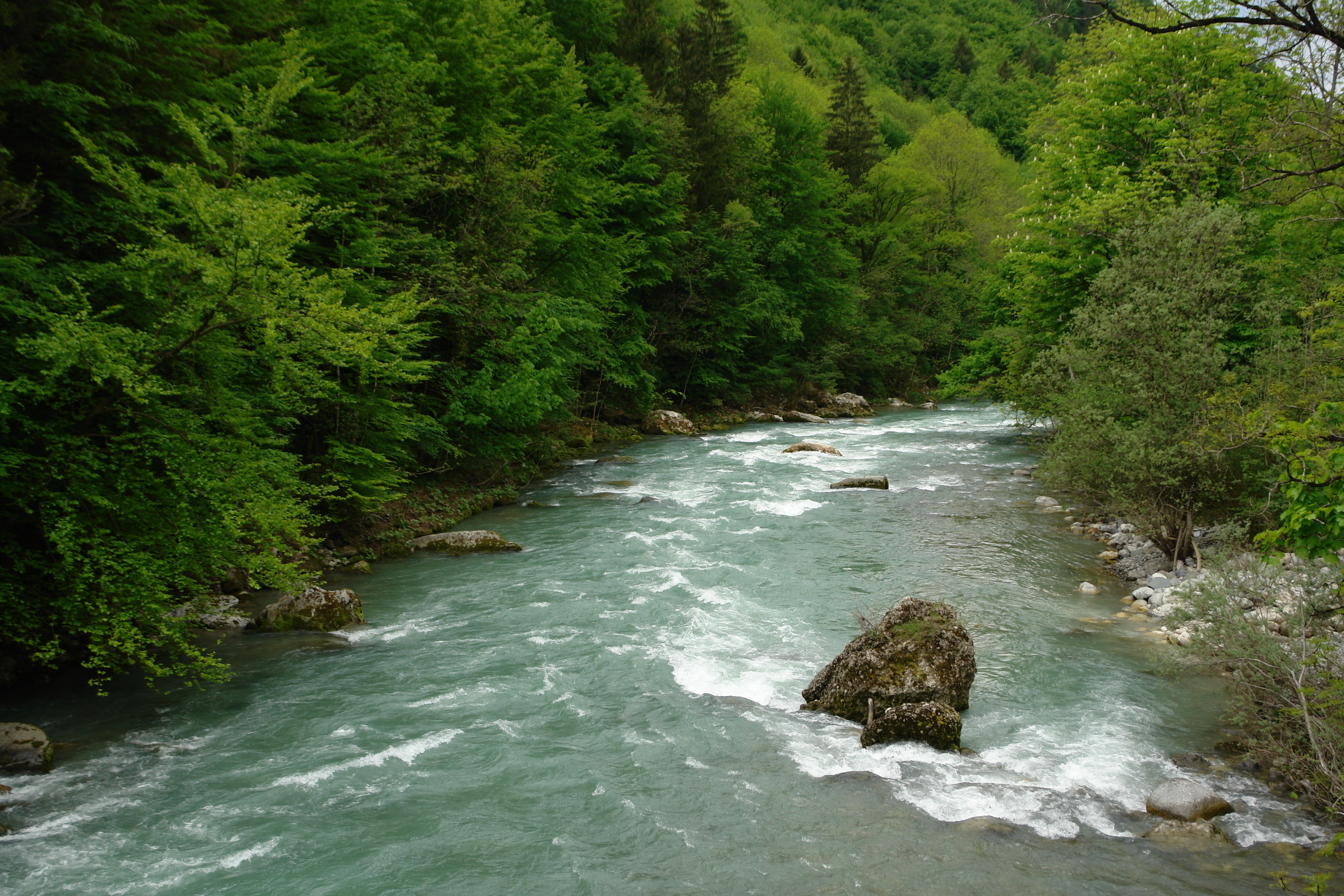
- The Dranse de Morzine

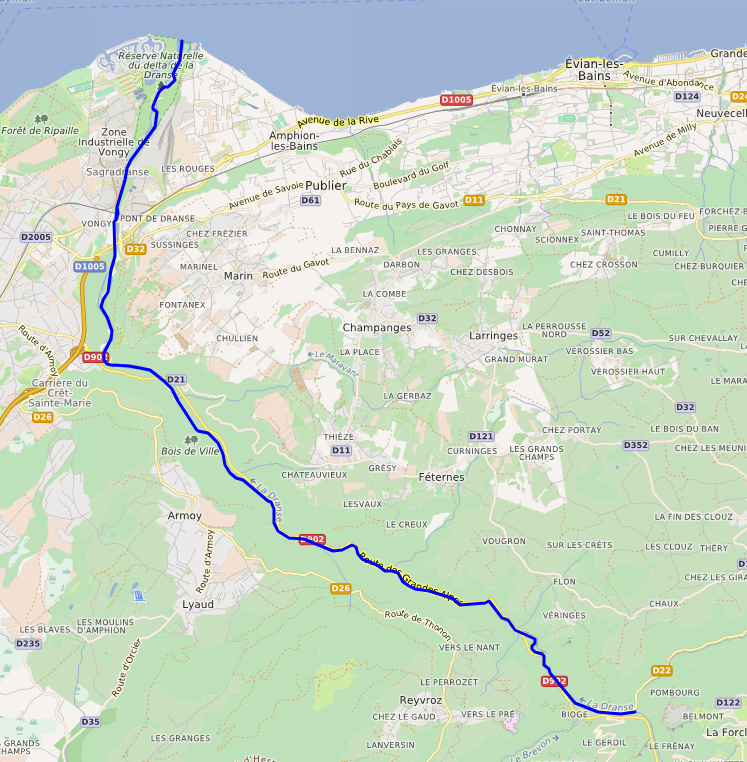
- Course of the Dranse
- Native name: la Dranse (French)

Location
- Country: France

Physical characteristics
- Source
  - location: Confluence of La Dranse d'Abondance and La Dranse de Morzine
- Mouth: Lake Geneva
  - coordinates: 46.4039°N 6.5190°E
- Length: 49.3 km (30.6 mi) including La Dranse d'Abondance
- Basin size: 495 km^{2} (191 mi^{2})
- Discharge
  - average: 20.1 m^{3}/s (710 cu ft/s)

Basin features
- Progression: Lake Geneva→ Rhône→ Mediterranean Sea

The Dranse (French pronunciation: [dʁɑ̃s]) is a French river in the department of Haute-Savoie, that empties into Lake Geneva between Thonon-les-Bains and Évian-les-Bains.

The name "Dranse" comes from the former Drantia, based on the hydronym dur-, dora and the suffix -antia.

== Geography ==
The Dranse is formed from the combination of three mountain rivers originating from the peaks of the upper Chablais Alps, which converge 9 to 10 kilometres (5.6 to 6.2 mi) upstream from the delta:

- To the east, the Dranse d'Abondance irrigates the Val d'Abondance and passes through the communes of Abondance and Châtel;
- To the south, the Dranse de Morzine passes through Morzine, Saint-Jean-d'Aulps and the Gorges du Pont-du-Diable;
- To the west, the Brevon, also called the Dranse de Bellevaux, originates from Roc d'Enfer and passes through Lac de Vallon and the villages of Bellevaux, Vailly and Reyvroz.

The Dranse d'Abondance is considered the higher-ordered stream of the Dranse. The Dranse de Morzine is consequently considered its tributary, according to Sandre, the French National Service for Water Data and Common Repositories Management.

The Dranse empties into Lake Geneva and forms a delta, which is integrated into the Delta de la Dranse National Nature Reserve, situated to the east of the commune of Thonon-les-Bains, which although small at an area of 53 hectares (130 acres), offers an incomparable botanic diversity.

The river is 49.3 kilometres (30.6 mi) long. Whitewater kayakers and commercial rafting companies frequently run this river.

== Hydrology ==
The Dranse is a high-volume river, as are all the rivers which originate in the Alpine mountain ranges. Its discharge was observed for a period of 97 years (1906–2003) in Reyvroz, a locality in the department of Haute-Savoie situated on the southern bank of Lake Geneva at the same elevation as its outlet. The drainage basin for the river is in its totality 495 square kilometres (191 mi^{2}), which is not quite three times the surface area of the city of Paris.

The annual average discharge of the river at Reyvroz is 20.1 cubic metres (710 ft^{3}) per second.

The Dranse is a typical seasonal river regime, with depends slightly on a small rain component. It exhibits sharply delineated seasonal fluctuations in discharge, which is characteristic of Alpine waterbodies. High flows occur in the springtime and are attributed to snowmelt. These accompany average monthly discharges of around 30 to 40 cubic metres (1,100 to 1,400 ft^{3}) per second from April to June (the maximum being reached in May). At the end of June, discharge rates sharply drop while the volume moves downstream. From the end of July to the end of February discharge is continuous, fluctuating between 12.7 to 17.1 cubic metres (450 to 600 ft^{3}) per second, with a low of 12.7 cubic metres (450 ft^{3}) in August, and a small "peak" cut in November, linked to the autumnal rain. However, these fluctuations are much more pronounced over short periods and depend on the year.

During times of low water, the low water discharge can fall as low as 2.5 cubic metres (88 ft^{3}) per second, in the case of a dry quinquennial period, and although low, it is considered normal in the regions of the Alps and Prealps.

In terms of floods which, although uncommon, can be very important, measures with certain "eau du midi". The maximum instantaneous discharge for a two-year (P_{2}) and five-year (P_{5}) flood events are 180 and 220 cubic metres (6,400 and 7,800 ft^{3}) respectively. The ten-year flood event (P_{10}) is 250 cubic metres (8,800 ft^{3}) per second, the twenty-year flood event (P_{20}) 270 cubic metres (9,500 ft^{3}), and the fifty-year flood (P_{50}) 310 cubic metres (11,000 ft^{3}).

The highest instantaneous flow recorded by the Reyvroz station was 273 cubic metres (9,600 ft^{3}) per second on the June 1, 1963, while the maximum daily value was 229 cubic metres (8,100 ft^{3}) per second on September 22, 1968. For comparison, the June 1963 value is comparable to a vicennial flood event, and is thus considered not that exceptional.

The discharge volume of Dranse is augmented by the abundant precipitation in the northern Alps. The runoff curve number for its drainage basin is 1,285 millimetres (50.6 in) annually, which elevated, is three times greater than the average for all of France. The specific discharge (Q_{sp}) of the river reaches 40.7 litres (10.8 US gal) per second and square kilometer of the basin.

== See also ==
- List of rivers of France
