= Dranse d'Abondance =

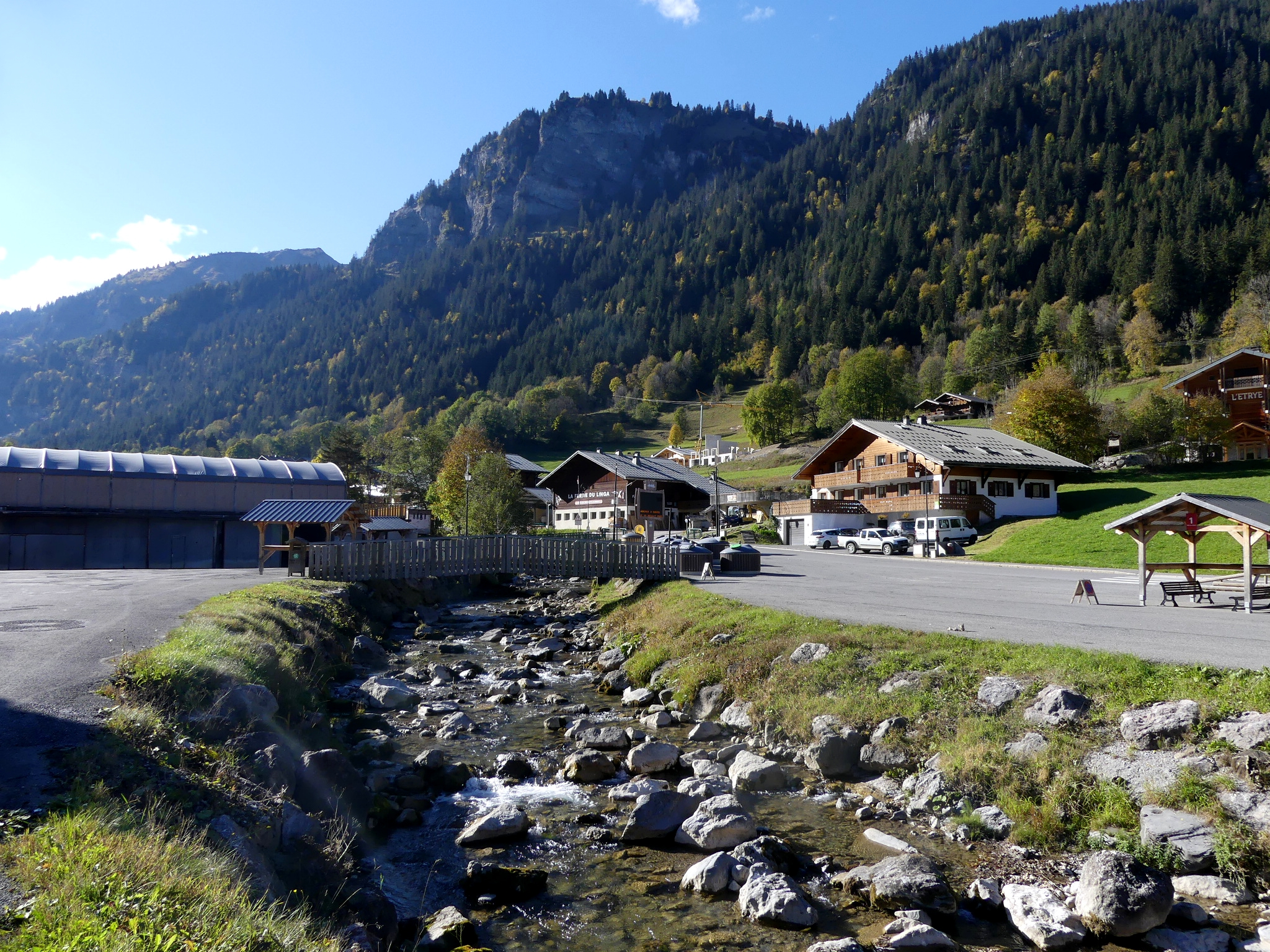

- Location within France Location within Auvergne-Rhône-Alpes

Location
- Country: France, Switzerland

Physical characteristics
- Mouth: Dranse
  - coordinates: 46.3248°N 6.5967°E
- Length: 18 km (11 mi)
- Basin size: 178 km^{2} (69 sq mi)

Basin features
- Progression: Dranse→ Lake Geneva→ Rhône→ Mediterranean Sea

The Dranse d'Abondance is the upper part of the river Dranse in the French department of Haute-Savoie, a sub-tributary of the Rhône.

== Geography ==
The river is sourced from above the hamlet of Plaine Dranse, in the commune of Châtel near the pointe de Chésery and the Franco-Swiss border, in the Chablais.

It irrigates the Val d'Abondance.

In Bioge (a commune of Reyvroz), the river joins the Dranse at the confluence with Dranse de Morzine, which empties into Lake Geneva in the Delta de la Dranse National Nature Reserve between Thonon-les-Bains and Évian-les-Bains.

=== Traversed communes ===
- Châtel
- La Chapelle-d'Abondance
- Abondance
- Bonnevaux
- Vacheresse
- Chevenoz

== Fish population ==
The Dranse d'Abondance stocks a population of brown trout from the Mediterranean. as are European bullheads. The fish are regulated by the AAPPMACG (Association Agréée pour la Pêche et la Protection du Milieu Aquatique du Chablais-Genevois).
