= Roc d'Enfer =

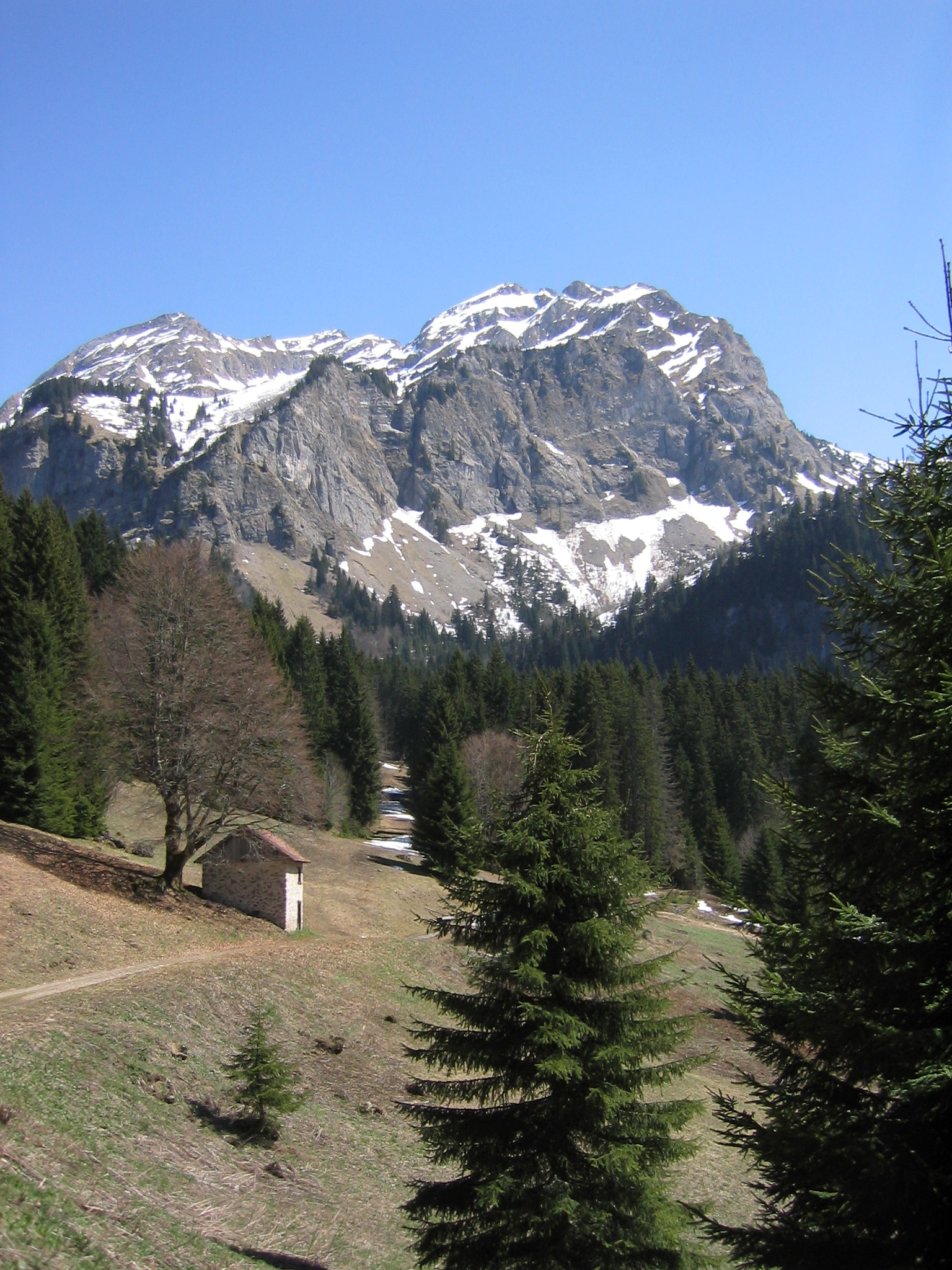

Highest point
- Elevation: 2,244 m (7,362 ft)
- Prominence: 1,081 m (3,547 ft)
- Parent peak: Dents du Midi
- Coordinates: 46°11′22″N 06°36′37″E

Geography
- Location within France
- Location: Haute-Savoie, France
- Parent range: Chablais Alps

The Roc d'Enfer (2,244 m) is a mountain of the Chablais Alps, located west of Morzine in the French department of Haute-Savoie. It lies 20 km south of Lake Geneva.
