= Gabrielle Nanchen =

Swiss politician

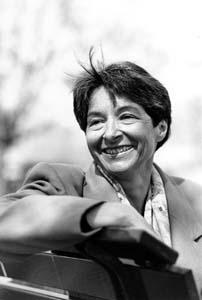
- Nanchen in 1993

Member of the National Council of Switzerland
- In office 29 November 1971 – 25 November 1979
- Preceded by: Karl Dellberg

Personal details
- Born: Gabrielle Stragiotti; 31 March 1943 (age 82) Aigle, Switzerland
- Party: Swiss Socialist Party

Gabrielle Nanchen (née Stragiotti; born 31 March 1943) is a Swiss politician and author. In 1971, she became one of the first 10 women elected to the National Council of Switzerland, serving in that body until 1979. She was a member of the Swiss Socialist Party. Since leaving office, she has written books on her personal pilgrimages to Santiago de Compostela and Africa.

== Biography ==
Gabrielle Stragiotti was born on 31 March 1943 in Aigle, in the canton of Vaud, the daughter of Cécile (née Thiault) and Gabriel Stragiotti. Her father was of Italian descent while her mother was of French descent. She graduated from the University of Lausanne in 1965 with a degree in social science.

In 1967, she married Maurice Nanchen and the couple settled in Maurice's home town of Icogne in the Canton of Valais. Nanchen became active in politics in part because she lost the right to vote when she moved to Valais. Her home canton of Vaud granted women's suffrage in 1959; but Valais would not grant the right to vote to women until 1970.

After Switzerland granted women the right to vote and stand for office in a referendum in 1971, the Socialist Party added her to its party list for National Council. She won election that year and became one of the first 10 women to serve in the Parliament of Switzerland.

In 1977, she ran for the Council of State of Valais, the canton's executive body, seeking to become the first woman elected to a cantonal executive. The Valais constitution prohibited the election of members from the same district. In this case, Nanchen and Antoine Zufferey, a member of the Christian Democratic People's Party of Switzerland, were both from the Sierre District. While both Nanchen and Zufferey captured enough votes for election to the council, Zufferey finished ahead between the two, with Nanchen finishing fifth. He was elected and Nanchen was passed over in favor of Arthur Bender.

She resigned from the National Council in 1979 after her third child was born. In 1980, she became a Vice President of the Federal Commission for Women's Issues and President of the Valais Association of Femmes - Rencontres - Travail (Women - Meetings - Work). She was defeated in 1983 Swiss federal election in a run for the Council of States.

Since her last run for office, Nanchen has served as a delegate to the Directorate for Development Cooperation and Humanitarian Aid and the Council of Europe. She was a member of the International Committee of the Red Cross and was the president of the Swissaid Foundation Board. She also became an author, publishing five books.

== Books ==
- Hommes et femmes. Le partage. Favre, Lausanne 1981.
- Liebe und Macht. Gedanken zu den weiblichen und den männlichen Werten. Benziger, Zürich 1992, ISBN 3-545-34109-7. Übersetzung von: Amour et pouvoir: Des hommes, des femmes et des valeurs. Favre, Lausanne 1990, ISBN 2-8289-0490-3.
- Compostelle. De la Reconquista à la réconciliation. Saint-Augustin, St-Maurice 2008, ISBN 978-2-88011-427-5.
- mit Jean-François Hellio, Nicolas van Ingen: Auf dem Jakobsweg. Von der Schweiz nach Santiago de Compostela – Eine Reise zu sich selbst. Mondo, Vevey 2009, ISBN 978-2-88900-208-5.
- Le goût des autres. Des nouvelles du vivre ensemble. Ed. Saint-Augustin, St-Maurice 2018, ISBN 978-2-88926-169-7.
