= Reyvroz =

- Commune
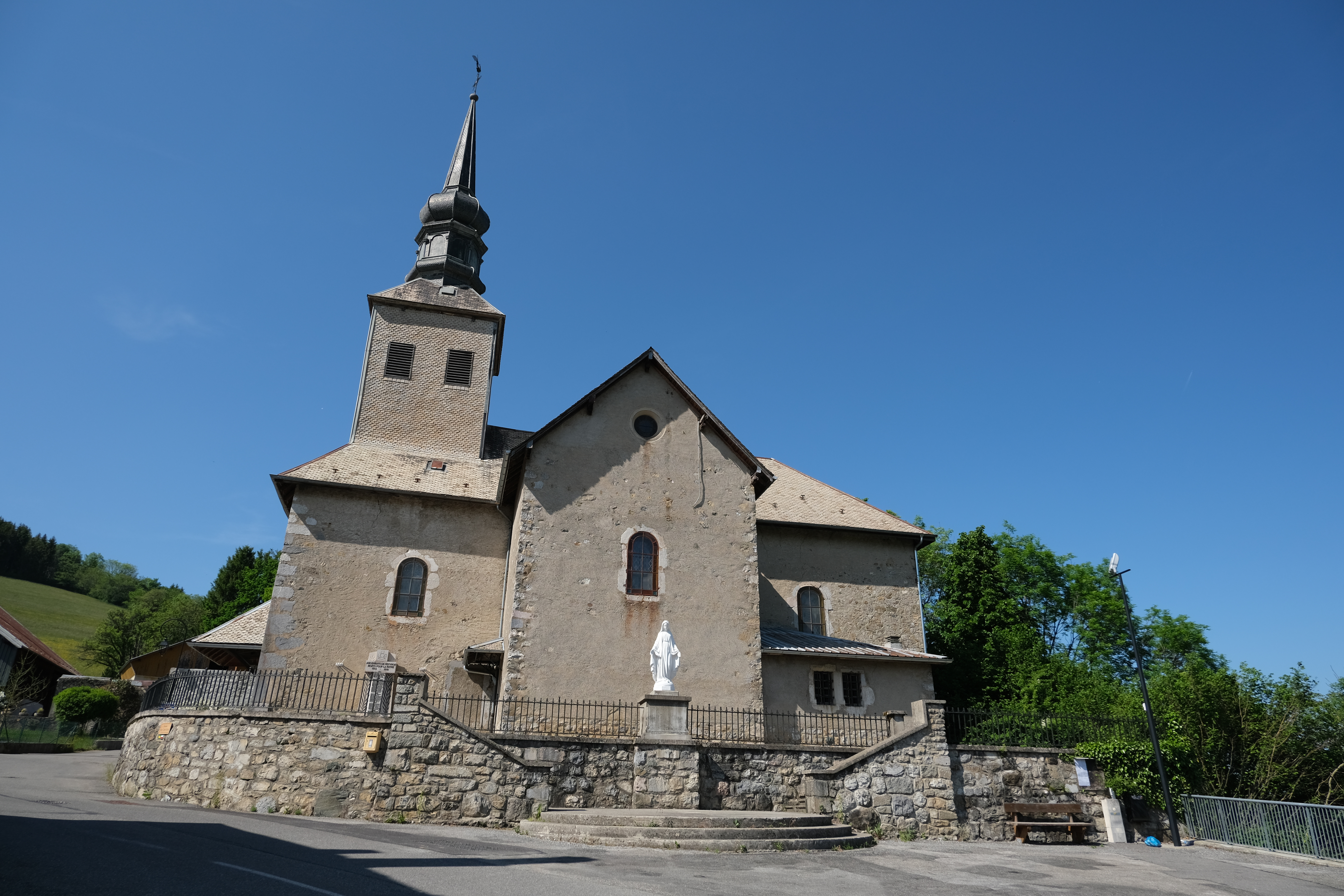
- Church of Saint-Maurice

- Coat of arms
- Location of Reyvroz
- Location within France Location within Auvergne-Rhône-Alpes
- Coordinates: 46°19′26″N 6°33′54″E
- Country: France
- Region: Auvergne-Rhône-Alpes
- Department: Haute-Savoie
- Arrondissement: Thonon-les-Bains
- Canton: Thonon-les-Bains

Government
  - Mayor (2020–2026): Gérald Lombard
- Area^{1}: 9.8 km^{2} (3.8 sq mi)
- Population (2023): 500
  - Density: 51/km^{2} (130/sq mi)
- Time zone: UTC+01:00 (CET)
  - Summer (DST): UTC+02:00 (CEST)
- INSEE/Postal code: 74222 /74200
- ^{1} French Land Register data, which excludes lakes, ponds, glaciers > 1 km^{2} (0.386 sq mi or 247 acres) and river estuaries.

Reyvroz (French pronunciation: [ʁɛvʁo]; Arpitan: Révro) is a commune in the Haute-Savoie department in the Auvergne-Rhône-Alpes region in south-eastern France.

== Toponymy ==
As with many polysyllabic Arpitan toponyms or anthroponyms, the final -x marks oxytonic stress (on the last syllable), whereas the final -z indicates paroxytonic stress (on the penultimate syllable) and should not be pronounced, although in French it is often mispronounced due to hypercorrection.

== See also ==
- Communes of the Haute-Savoie department
