= Delta de la Dranse National Nature Reserve =

Protected area in France

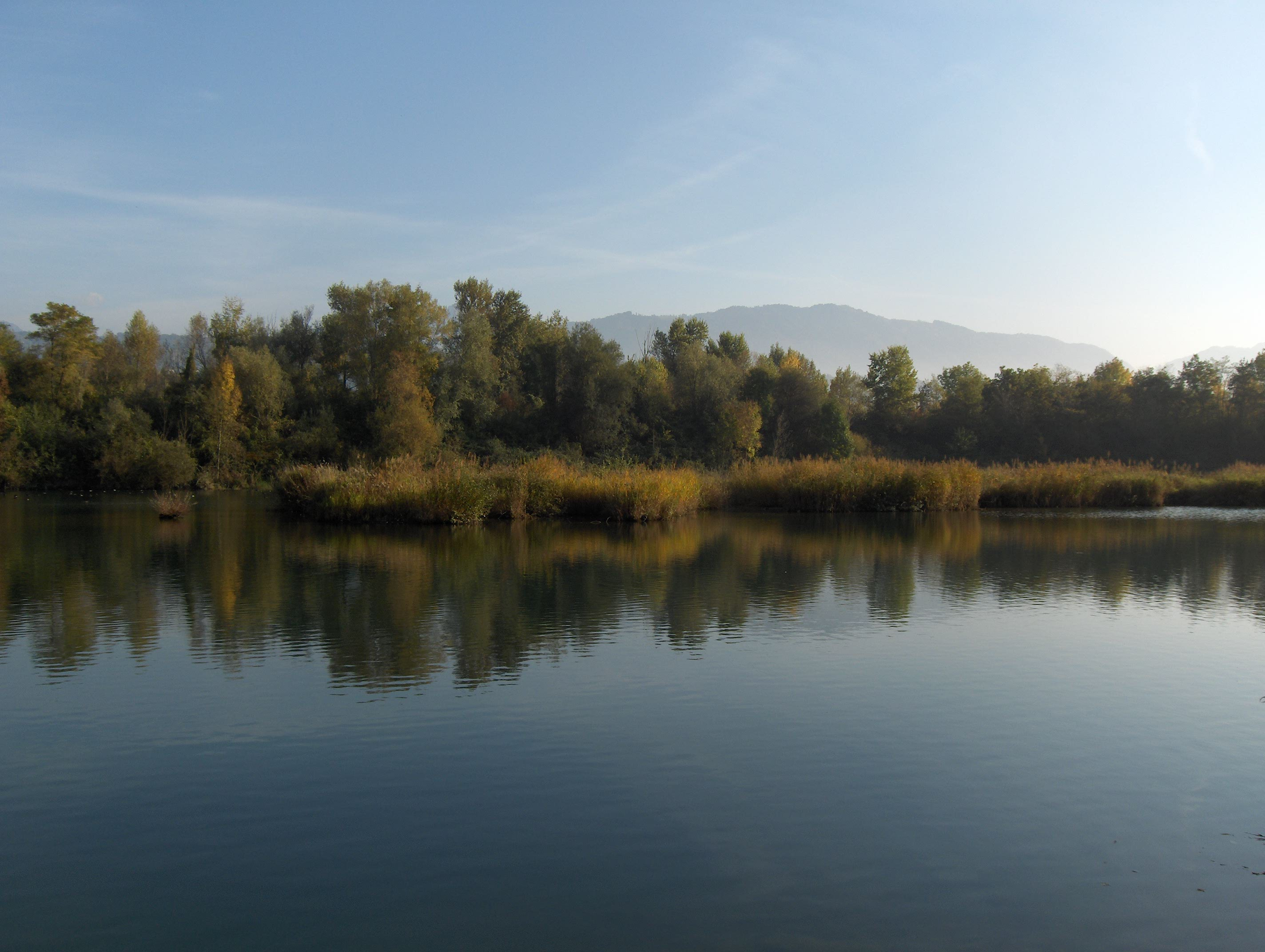
- At around 200 metres (660 ft) upstream from the Dranse delta, these small islands serve as shelters for endemic species
- Interactive map of Delta de la Dranse National Nature Reserve
- Location: Haute-Savoie, Rhone-Alpes, France
- Coordinates: 46°24′14″N 6°31′09″E
- Length: 1.5 km (0.93 mi)
- Width: .5 km (0.31 mi)
- Area: .53 km^{2} (0.20 sq mi)

The Delta de la Dranse National Nature Reserve is a nature reserve located in the delta of the Dranse river. The reserve is located to the east of the commune of Thonon-les-Bains in southeastern France. At 1.5 kilometres (0.93 mi) long by 500 metres (1,600 ft) wide, it covers a small area of 53 hectares (130 acres) at an elevation ranging from 372 to 380 metres (1,220 to 1,247 ft). Offering a rich botanic biodiversity, the site was declared a national nature reserve in January 1980 and declared a special "zone of protection" since September 1986.

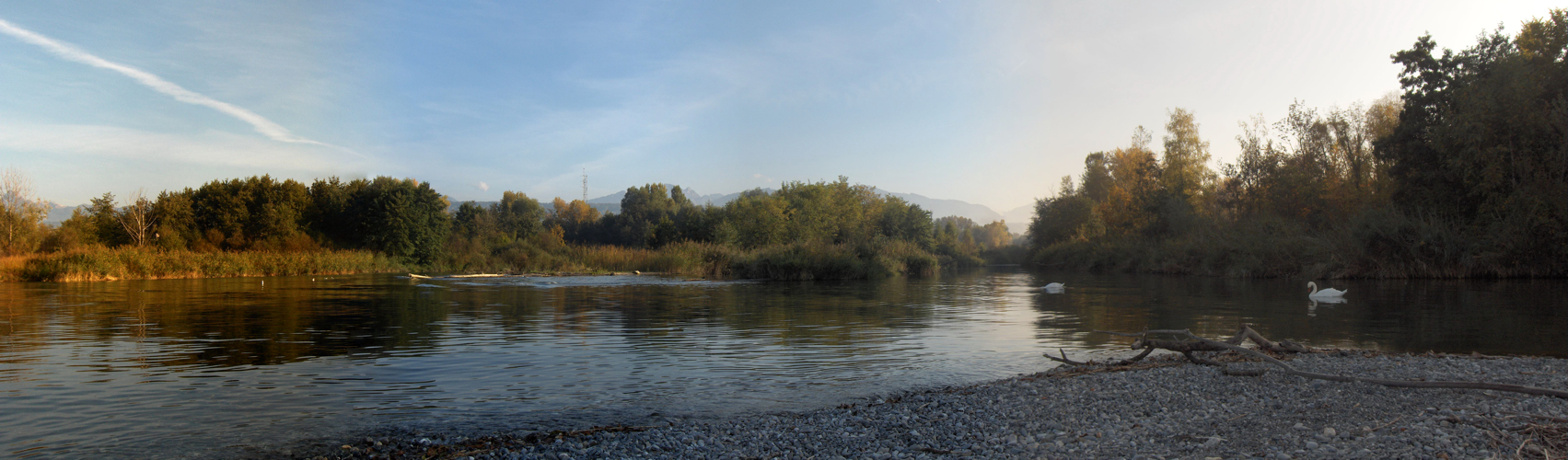
The mouth of the Dranse River and the nature reserve

The beach of the last river delta along Lake Geneva is constituted of alluvium, sand, stones, and pebbles. The sandy beaches and small islands are constantly being formed by the path of the rising torrential river, which has resulted in the expansion of a rich diversity of flora and wildlife. The reserve shelters:

- Close to 750 plant species including orchids;
- More than 200 species of birds, notably the red-crested pochard, the little ringed plover – the reserve is the only nesting site for the common tern in the larger Rhone basin, additionally it is the southernmost point where the common gull nests;
- Numerous reptiles and amphibian species are equally represented;
- European beavers are well established along the banks.
