= Essert =

Essert may refer to the following places:

== In France ==
- Essert, Territoire de Belfort
- Essert-Romand, in the Haute-Savoie département

== In Switzerland ==
- Essert, Switzerland, in the Canton of Fribourg
- Essert-Pittet, in the Canton of Vaud
- Essert-sous-Champvent, in the Canton of Vaud
