= Jacqueline Thévoz =

Swiss writer and poet (1926–2021)

- Born: 29 April 1926; Estavayer-le-Lac, Switzerland
- Died: 29 January 2021 (aged 94)
- Occupations: Writer; Poet

Jacqueline Thévoz (29 April 1926 – 29 January 2021) was a Swiss writer, poet, and journalist.

== Biography ==
Thévoz attended the University of Lausanne, where she studied political science, and won the Follope Prize in 1949. She simultaneously studied music and choreography at the Conservatoire Lausanne-Paris. She began her career as a journalist. She also had a career as a choreographer and music composer. She published multiple novels, plays, and collections of poems and essays, and was active in several writing associations, including the Association vaudoise des écrivains and the Société des gens de lettres. In her later years she lived in the French commune of Larringes near Évian, close to the Swiss border.

Jacqueline Thévoz died on 29 January 2021 at the age of 94.

== Publications ==
- Initiation à la musique par le disque (Éditions Marguerat, 1956).
- Simon d'Estavayer (Éditions du capricorne, 1956). [Novel]
- Raison vagabonde (Éditions Risold, 1959). [Poetry]
- Mon grand voyage autour du monde (Éditions de la revue moderne, 1966). [Poetry]
- Traité de la sexualité féminine (Éditions nant d'enfer, 1967; rev. ed. Réédition aux Cahiers de la Bretagne Réelle, 1986).
- Petit traité de danse classique (Éditions Maison rhodanienne de poésie, 1971). [Poetry]
- Traité de rythmique (Éditions Maison rhodanienne de poésie, 1971). Gold medal at the Académie internationale de Lutèce.
- Le cheval (Éditions Marguerat, 1972). [Poetry]
- La danse (Éditions Marguerat, 1972). [Poetry]
- Aloys Fornerod (Éditions Maison rhodanienne de poésie, 1973). [Poetry]
- Le Roman d’un Fœtus (Éditions Maison rhodanienne, 1974). [Novel]
- Escales vers ma mort (Éditions Maison rhodanienne de poésie, 1974). [Poetry]
- Mimile (Éditions Maison rhodanienne, 1975). [Novella]
- Journal poétique d'une femme de trente ans (Éditions Maison rhodanienne de poésie, 1976). [Poetry] Gold medal at the Académie internationale de Lutèce.
- Jean Dawint, l'extraordinaire châtelain de Cernex (Éditions Maison rhodanienne de poésie, 1977). [Poetry]
- Le château de Paradis (Éditions Maison rhodanienne, 1979). [Novel] Gold medal at the Académie internationale de Lutèce, and bronze medal at the Arts-Sciences-Lettres de la ville de Bordeaux.
- Le prince au palais dormant (Éditions Maison rhodanienne, 1980). [Novel] Louis Allègre Prize.
- Maman soleil (Éditions Maison rhodanienne de poésie, 1980). [Poetry] Silver medal at the Académie internationale de Lutèce.
- Les termites (Éditions le Front littéraire, 1982). Prix de l'Académie des Treize, gold medal at the Académie internationale de Lutèce.
- Passage d'une comète, en hommage à Rudolf Noureyev (Éditions du madrier, 1995).
- Un matricide très pardonnable (Éditions ver luisant, 1999).
- Vieillesse en petits morceaux (Sierre, Switzerland: Éditions à la Carte, 2001).
- Simon l’Infidèle (Sierre, Switzerland: Éditions à la Carte, 2002).
- Rhapsodie autobiographique (Sierre, Switzerland: Éditions à la Carte, 2005).
- Vacances en Purgatoire (Sierre, Switzerland: Éditions à la Carte, 2006).
- La fin du monde comme si vous y étiez (Sierre, Switzerland: Éditions à la Carte, 2007).
- 44 leçons de foi (Sierre, Switzerland: Éditions à la Carte, 2008).
- Contes et légendes de l’Au-Delà (Sierre, Switzerland: Éditions à la Carte, 2009).
- Mourir avant l'hiver (Sierre, Switzerland: Éditions à la Carte, 2010).
- Saga familiale: Les Thévoz-Thurler (Sierre, Switzerland: Éditions à la Carte, 2011).
- Le souffle de la mort (Sierre, Switzerland: Éditions à la Carte, 2012).
- Pourquoi l'Apocalypse n'a pas eu lieu? (Sierre, Switzerland: Éditions à la Carte, 2013).
- Jacques Thevoz tel que je l'ai connu (Sierre, Switzerland: Éditions à la Carte, 2014).
- De la terre au ciel (poèmes d’une vie) (Sierre, Switzerland: Éditions à la Carte, 2015).
- Les derniers jours de Kiki (Sierre, Switzerland: Éditions à la Carte, 2015).

=== Contributions to collaborative works ===
- Livre d'or des vingt ans de l'Académie internationale de Lutèce (Paris: Éditions Grassin, 1986).
- 30 ans de poésie contemporaine 1957-1987 (Paris: Éditions Grassin, 1987).
- World Poetry (Seoul, South Korea: W. P. Research Institute, 1987).
- Célébration des nourritures (Le Mont-sur-Lausanne: Edition Ouverture, 1990).
- La Grande Visite (Le Mont-sur-Lausanne: Edition Ouverture, 1992).
- Regards sur Coppet (Yens-sur-Morges, Switzerland: Edition Cabédita, 1995).
- Malaz en poésie (Cervens, Switzerland: Société des Auteurs Savoyards, 1995).
- Nouvelles du hasard (Ottawa, Canada: Edition du Vermillon, 2004).
- Dis-moi ton ange (Lausanne, Switzerland: Edition Publi-Libris, 2005).
- Le tunnel (Ottawa, Canada: Edition du Vermillon, 2007).
- Robert Roman (ed.), Le rêveur lucide (Toulouse, France: Edition du Contentieux, 2013).
