= Arrondissement of Thonon-les-Bains =

Coordinates: 46°22′09″N 6°28′20″E

Thonon-les-Bains
- Arrondissement
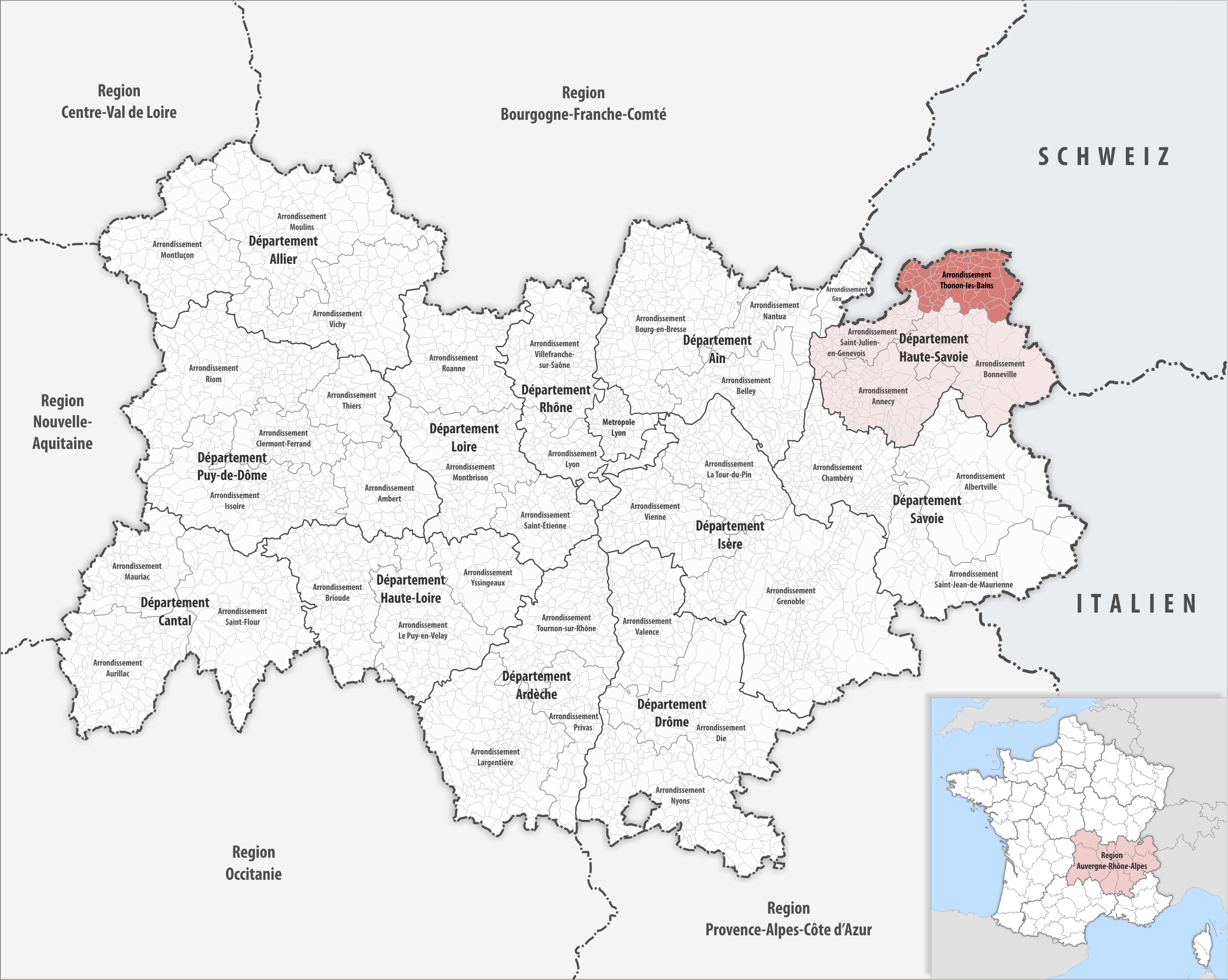
- Location within the region Auvergne-Rhône-Alpes
- Country: France
- Region: Auvergne-Rhône-Alpes
- Department: Haute-Savoie
- No. of communes: {{{nbcomm}}}
- Area: 950.0 km^{2} (366.8 sq mi)
- Population (2023): 161,163
  - Density: 169.6/km^{2} (439.4/sq mi)
- INSEE code: 744

The arrondissement of Thonon-les-Bains is an arrondissement of France in the Haute-Savoie department in the Auvergne-Rhône-Alpes region. It has 70 communes. Its population is 157,071 (2021), and its area is 950.0 km^{2} (366.8 sq mi).

== Composition ==
The communes of the arrondissement of Thonon-les-Bains, and their INSEE codes, are:

1. Abondance (74001)
2. Allinges (74005)
3. Anthy-sur-Léman (74013)
4. Armoy (74020)
5. Ballaison (74025)
6. La Baume (74030)
7. Bellevaux (74032)
8. Bernex (74033)
9. Le Biot (74034)
10. Boëge (74037)
11. Bogève (74038)
12. Bonnevaux (74041)
13. Bons-en-Chablais (74043)
14. Brenthonne (74048)
15. Burdignin (74050)
16. Cervens (74053)
17. Champanges (74057)
18. La Chapelle-d'Abondance (74058)
19. Châtel (74063)
20. Chens-sur-Léman (74070)
21. Chevenoz (74073)
22. La Côte-d'Arbroz (74091)
23. Douvaine (74105)
24. Draillant (74106)
25. Essert-Romand (74114)
26. Évian-les-Bains (74119)
27. Excenevex (74121)
28. Fessy (74126)
29. Féternes (74127)
30. La Forclaz (74129)
31. Les Gets (74134)
32. Habère-Lullin (74139)
33. Habère-Poche (74140)
34. Larringes (74146)
35. Loisin (74150)
36. Lugrin (74154)
37. Lullin (74155)
38. Lully (74156)
39. Lyaud (74157)
40. Margencel (74163)
41. Marin (74166)
42. Massongy (74171)
43. Maxilly-sur-Léman (74172)
44. Meillerie (74175)
45. Messery (74180)
46. Montriond (74188)
47. Morzine (74191)
48. Nernier (74199)
49. Neuvecelle (74200)
50. Novel, Haute-Savoie (74203)
51. Orcier (74206)
52. Perrignier (74210)
53. Publier (74218)
54. Reyvroz (74222)
55. Saint-André-de-Boëge (74226)
56. Saint-Gingolph (74237)
57. Saint-Jean-d'Aulps (74238)
58. Saint-Paul-en-Chablais (74249)
59. Saxel (74261)
60. Sciez (74263)
61. Seytroux (74271)
62. Thollon-les-Mémises (74279)
63. Thonon-les-Bains (74281)
64. Vacheresse (74286)
65. Vailly (74287)
66. Veigy-Foncenex (74293)
67. La Vernaz (74295)
68. Villard (74301)
69. Vinzier (74308)
70. Yvoire (74315)

== History ==
The arrondissement of Thonon-les-Bains was created in 1860. In June 2023 it gained two communes from the arrondissement of Bonneville.

As a result of the reorganisation of the cantons of France which came into effect in 2015, the borders of the cantons are no longer related to the borders of the arrondissements. The cantons of the arrondissement of Thonon-les-Bains were, as of January 2015:

1. Abondance
2. Le Biot
3. Boëge
4. Douvaine
5. Évian-les-Bains
6. Thonon-les-Bains-Est
7. Thonon-les-Bains-Ouest
