= La Baume =

- Commune
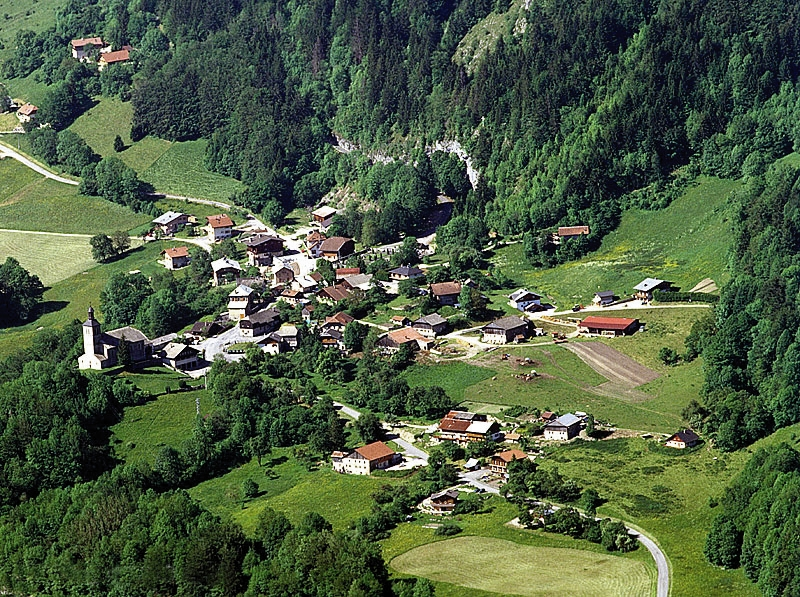
- An aerial view of La Baume
- Location of La Baume
- Location within France Location within Auvergne-Rhône-Alpes
- Coordinates: 46°16′59″N 6°36′48″E
- Country: France
- Region: Auvergne-Rhône-Alpes
- Department: Haute-Savoie
- Arrondissement: Thonon-les-Bains
- Canton: Évian-les-Bains
- Intercommunality: Haut-Chablais

Government
  - Mayor (2020–2026): Jean-François Menoud
- Area^{1}: 16.91 km^{2} (6.53 sq mi)
- Highest elevation: 1,890 m (6,200 ft)
- Lowest elevation: 636 m (2,087 ft)
- Population (2023): 320
  - Density: 19/km^{2} (49/sq mi)
- Time zone: UTC+01:00 (CET)
  - Summer (DST): UTC+02:00 (CEST)
- INSEE/Postal code: 74030 /74430
- ^{1} French Land Register data, which excludes lakes, ponds, glaciers > 1 km^{2} (0.386 sq mi or 247 acres) and river estuaries.

La Baume (French pronunciation: [la bom]; Arpitan: La Bôma) is a commune in the Haute-Savoie department in the Auvergne-Rhône-Alpes region in south-eastern France.

== Geography ==
It is situated in the High Savoy between Thonon-les-Bains and Morzine. According to the French Wikipedia page, it is called 'La Baume' because the church is situated on a rock.

== Administration ==
The current mayor of La Baume is Jean-François Menoud, elected in 2020.

== Demography ==
Historical population
Year	Pop.	±% p.a.
1968	214	—
1975	179	−2.52%
1982	165	−1.16%
1990	191	+1.85%
1999	228	+1.99%
2007	251	+1.21%
2012	250	−0.08%
2017	309	+4.33%
2023	320	+0.58%
Source: INSEE

== Places of interest ==
The 'Barrage du Jotty', is a dam of the lake of Le Jotty shared by the communes of La Vernaz and La Baume.

== See also ==
- Communes of the Haute-Savoie department
- Leesville, Texas, its land majorly granted to the late Countship of La Baume
