= Marin, Haute-Savoie =

Marin
- Commune
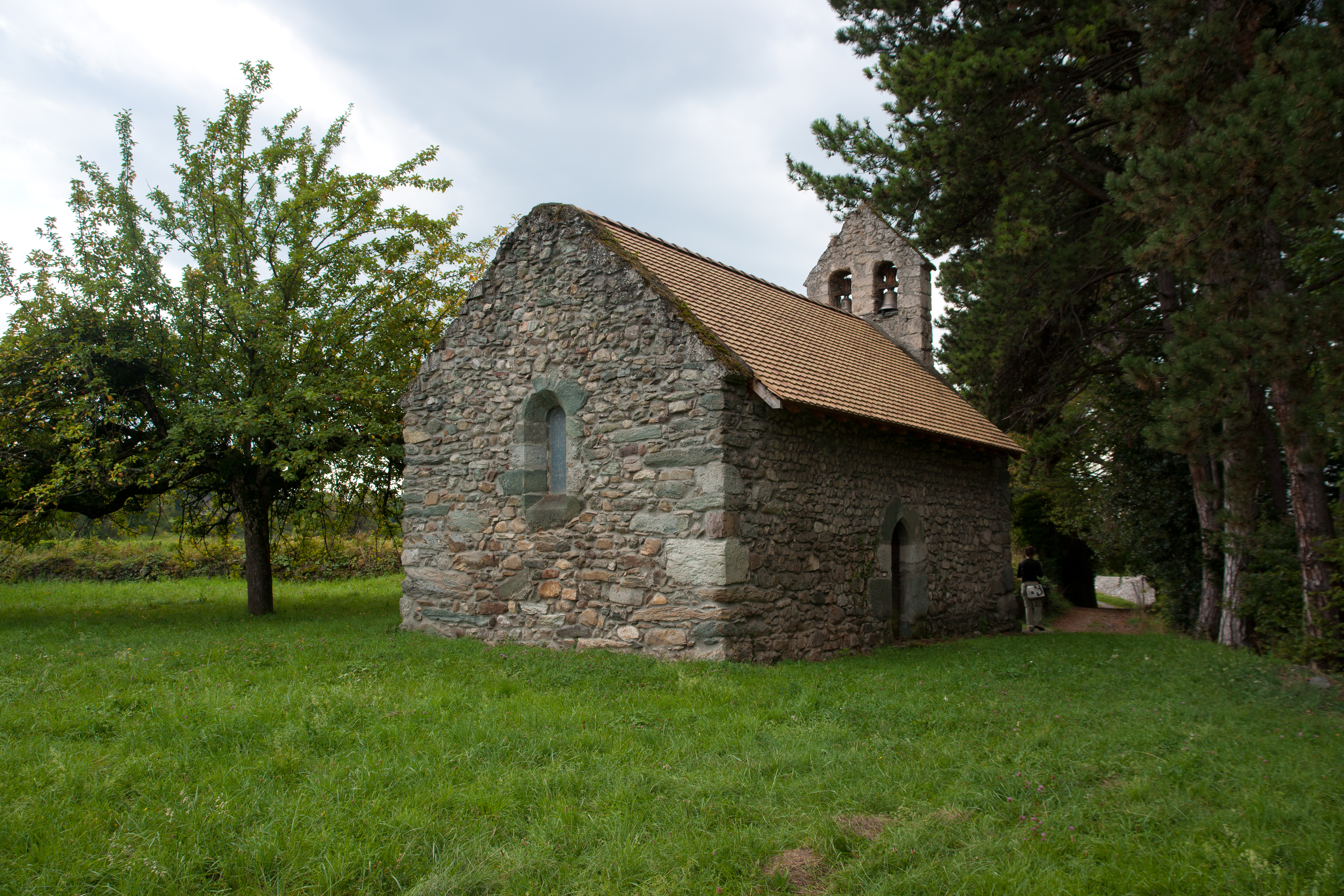
- The Chapel of Saint-Étienne, in Marin
- Location of Marin
- Location within France Location within Auvergne-Rhône-Alpes
- Coordinates: 46°22′32″N 6°31′44″E
- Country: France
- Region: Auvergne-Rhône-Alpes
- Department: Haute-Savoie
- Arrondissement: Thonon-les-Bains
- Canton: Évian-les-Bains

Government
  - Mayor (2020–2026): Pascal Chessel
- Area^{1}: 5.13 km^{2} (1.98 sq mi)
- Population (2023): 1,940
  - Density: 378/km^{2} (979/sq mi)
- Time zone: UTC+01:00 (CET)
  - Summer (DST): UTC+02:00 (CEST)
- INSEE/Postal code: 74166 /74200
- Website: www.mairie-marin.fr
- ^{1} French Land Register data, which excludes lakes, ponds, glaciers > 1 km^{2} (0.386 sq mi or 247 acres) and river estuaries.

Marin (French pronunciation: [maʁɛ̃]) is a commune in the Haute-Savoie department in the Auvergne-Rhône-Alpes region in south-eastern France.

== See also ==
- Communes of the Haute-Savoie department
