= Burdignin =

Burdignin Bordenyin (Savoyard)
- Commune
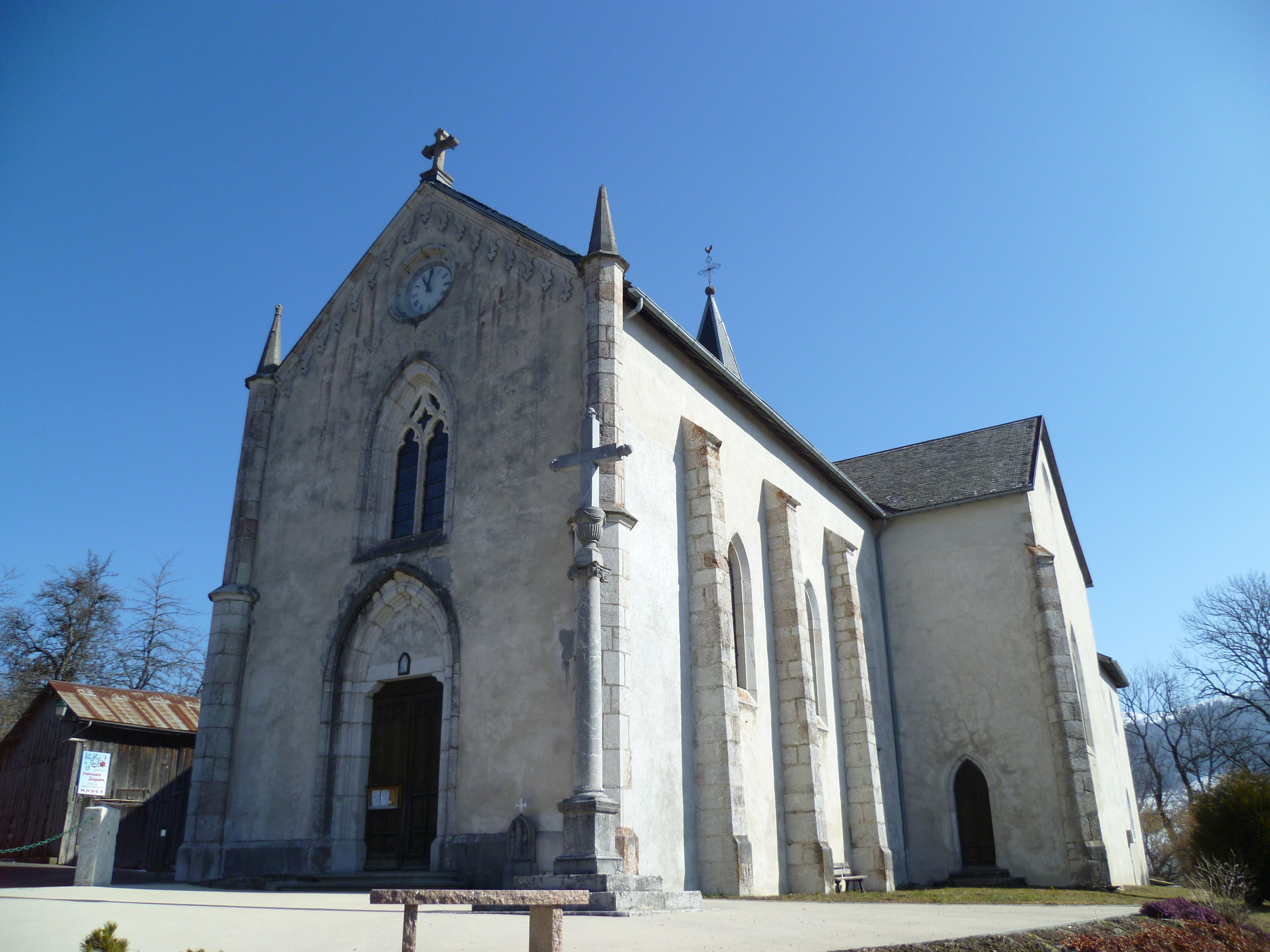
- The church in Burdignin
- Location of Burdignin
- Location within France Location within Auvergne-Rhône-Alpes
- Coordinates: 46°13′19″N 6°25′29″E
- Country: France
- Region: Auvergne-Rhône-Alpes
- Department: Haute-Savoie
- Arrondissement: Thonon-les-Bains
- Canton: Sciez

Government
  - Mayor (2020–2026): Pierre Chautemps
- Area^{1}: 9.87 km^{2} (3.81 sq mi)
- Highest elevation: 1,297 m (4,255 ft)
- Lowest elevation: 736 m (2,415 ft)
- Population (2023): 712
  - Density: 72.1/km^{2} (187/sq mi)
- Time zone: UTC+01:00 (CET)
  - Summer (DST): UTC+02:00 (CEST)
- INSEE/Postal code: 74050 /74420
- Website: www.burdignin.fr
- ^{1} French Land Register data, which excludes lakes, ponds, glaciers > 1 km^{2} (0.386 sq mi or 247 acres) and river estuaries.

Burdignin (French pronunciation: [byʁdiɲɛ̃]; Savoyard: Bordenyin) is a commune in the Haute-Savoie department in the Auvergne-Rhône-Alpes region in south-eastern France.

== Basic ==
Burdignin is a common medium mountain located in the heart of the Green Valley, north of the department of Haute Savoie. Burdignin depends on the canton of Boëge and is part of the Chablais Alps but is also close to the Geneva area .

Burdignin has preserved an agricultural and forestry tradition. This quiet little village allows mountain biking (forest track and edges Menoge), but also hiking (snowshoeing in winter the peaks between Mont Blanc and Lake Geneva). The people are bornérandes and bornérands .

== Surroundings ==
Burdignin is easily accessible by road, just 15 minutes from the motorway ATMB (exit Green Valley)

=== By Distance ===
- 3 km from Boege, head of the canton, shops, market on Tuesday morning
- 5 km of Habère- Poche, alpine ski area Habère- Poche, Bellevaux Hirmentaz
- 7 km of the plateau Moises, Nordic ski and opportunity to make the glider
- 12 km from the plateau of Plaine Joux, Nordic ski, hiking peak Miribel
- 25 km from Lake Geneva

=== By Time ===
- 45 minutes of Annecy
- 1 hour from Chamonix
- 25 minutes from Thonon-les-Bains
- 30 minutes from Geneva

== Burdignin in numbers ==
- Total Population: 643 inhabitants (2008)
- Area: 980 hectares
- Elevation Capital: 850 meters
- Maximum elevation: 1297 meters

== See also ==
- Communes of the Haute-Savoie department
