= Villard, Haute-Savoie =

Villard
- Commune
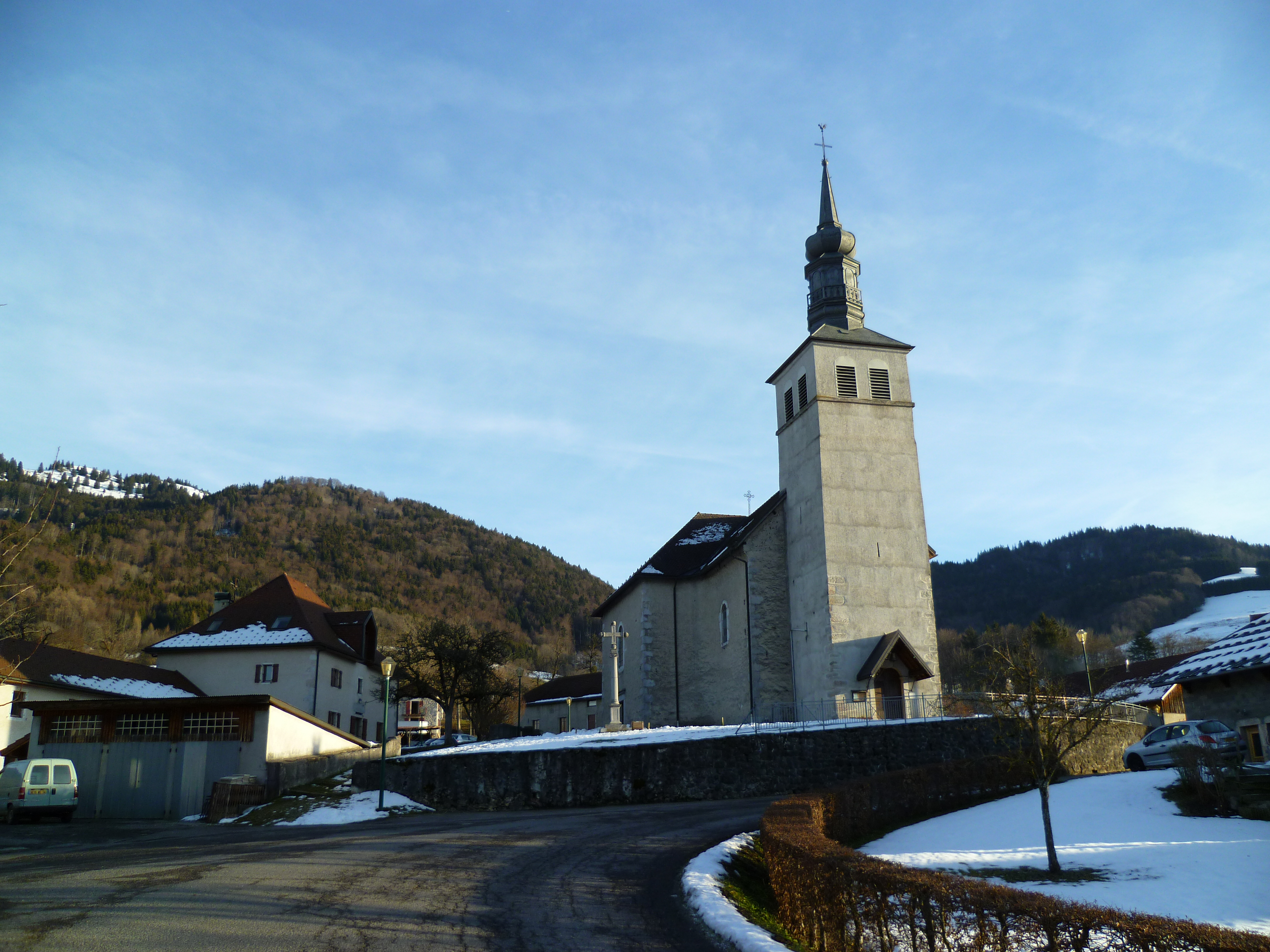
- The church in Villard
- Location of Villard
- Location within France Location within Auvergne-Rhône-Alpes
- Coordinates: 46°13′05″N 6°26′29″E
- Country: France
- Region: Auvergne-Rhône-Alpes
- Department: Haute-Savoie
- Arrondissement: Thonon-les-Bains
- Canton: Sciez

Government
  - Mayor (2020–2026): Pierrick Dufourd
- Area^{1}: 7.42 km^{2} (2.86 sq mi)
- Elevation: 806 m (2,644 ft)
- Highest elevation: 1,581 m (5,187 ft)
- Lowest elevation: 750 m (2,460 ft)
- Population (2023): 947
  - Density: 128/km^{2} (331/sq mi)
- Time zone: UTC+01:00 (CET)
  - Summer (DST): UTC+02:00 (CEST)
- INSEE/Postal code: 74301 /74420
- ^{1} French Land Register data, which excludes lakes, ponds, glaciers > 1 km^{2} (0.386 sq mi or 247 acres) and river estuaries.

Villard (French pronunciation: [vilaʁ]; Arpitan: Le Vlyâr) is a commune in the Haute-Savoie department in the Auvergne-Rhône-Alpes region in south-eastern France.

== See also ==
- Communes of the Haute-Savoie department
