= Féternes =

- Commune
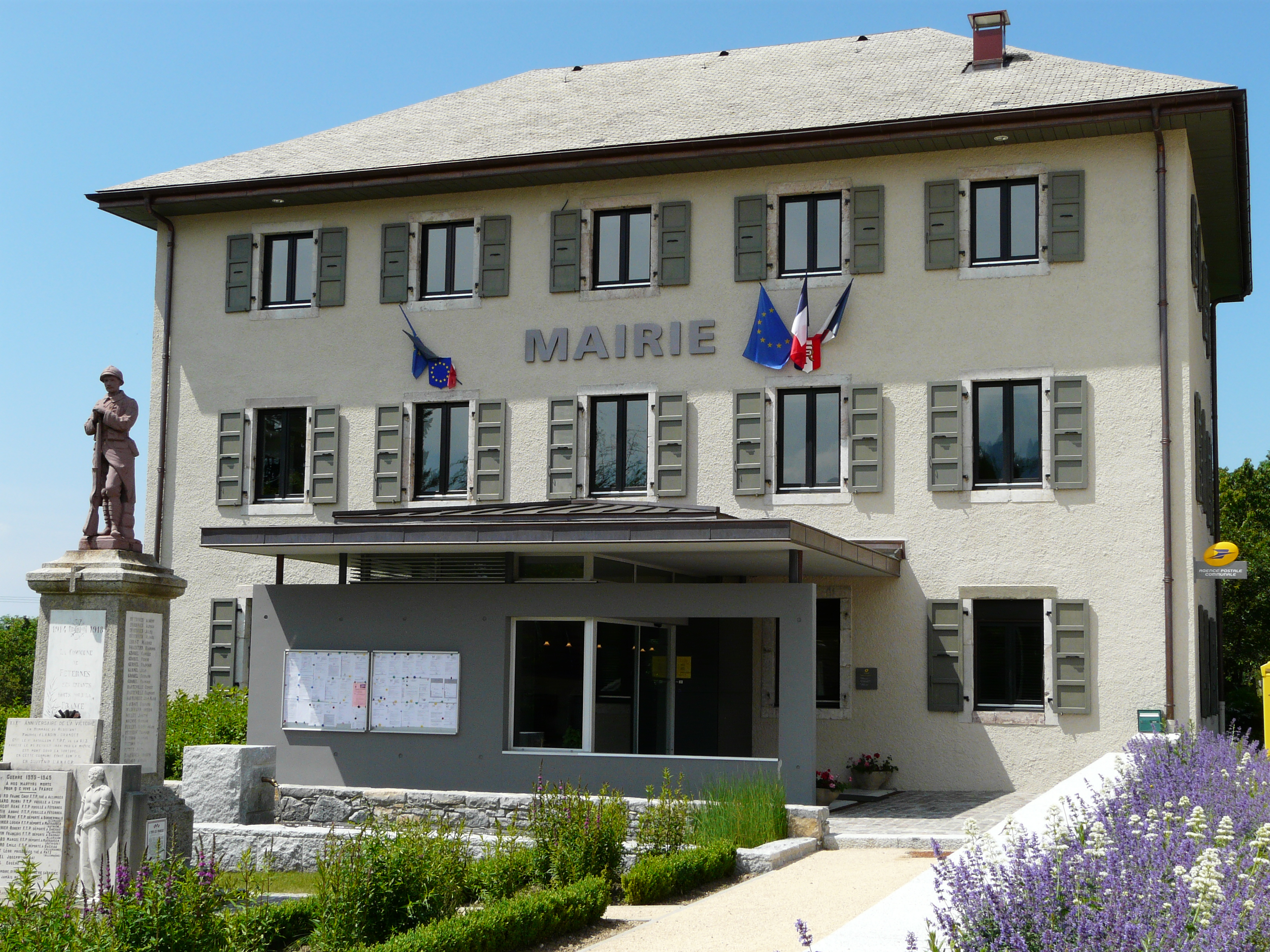
- The town hall in Féternes

- Coat of arms
- Location of Féternes
- Location within France Location within Auvergne-Rhône-Alpes
- Coordinates: 46°21′22″N 6°34′49″E
- Country: France
- Region: Auvergne-Rhône-Alpes
- Department: Haute-Savoie
- Arrondissement: Thonon-les-Bains
- Canton: Évian-les-Bains
- Intercommunality: Pays d'Évian Vallée d'Abondance

Government
  - Mayor (2020–2026): Maxime Julliard
- Area^{1}: 14.9 km^{2} (5.8 sq mi)
- Population (2023): 1,550
  - Density: 104/km^{2} (269/sq mi)
- Time zone: UTC+01:00 (CET)
  - Summer (DST): UTC+02:00 (CEST)
- INSEE/Postal code: 74127 /74500
- Website: www.feternes.fr
- ^{1} French Land Register data, which excludes lakes, ponds, glaciers > 1 km^{2} (0.386 sq mi or 247 acres) and river estuaries.

Féternes (French pronunciation: [fetɛʁn]; Arpitan: Fètèrna) is a commune in the Haute-Savoie department in the Auvergne-Rhône-Alpes region in south-eastern France.

== Notable citizens ==
- Victor Martin (1912–1989) Belgian sociologist and resistant. In 1943 went undercover to Auschwitz camp to bring direct account of its true activities. Retired in Féternes after years at the International Labour Organization.

== See also ==
- Communes of the Haute-Savoie department
