= Novel, Haute-Savoie =

Novel
- Commune
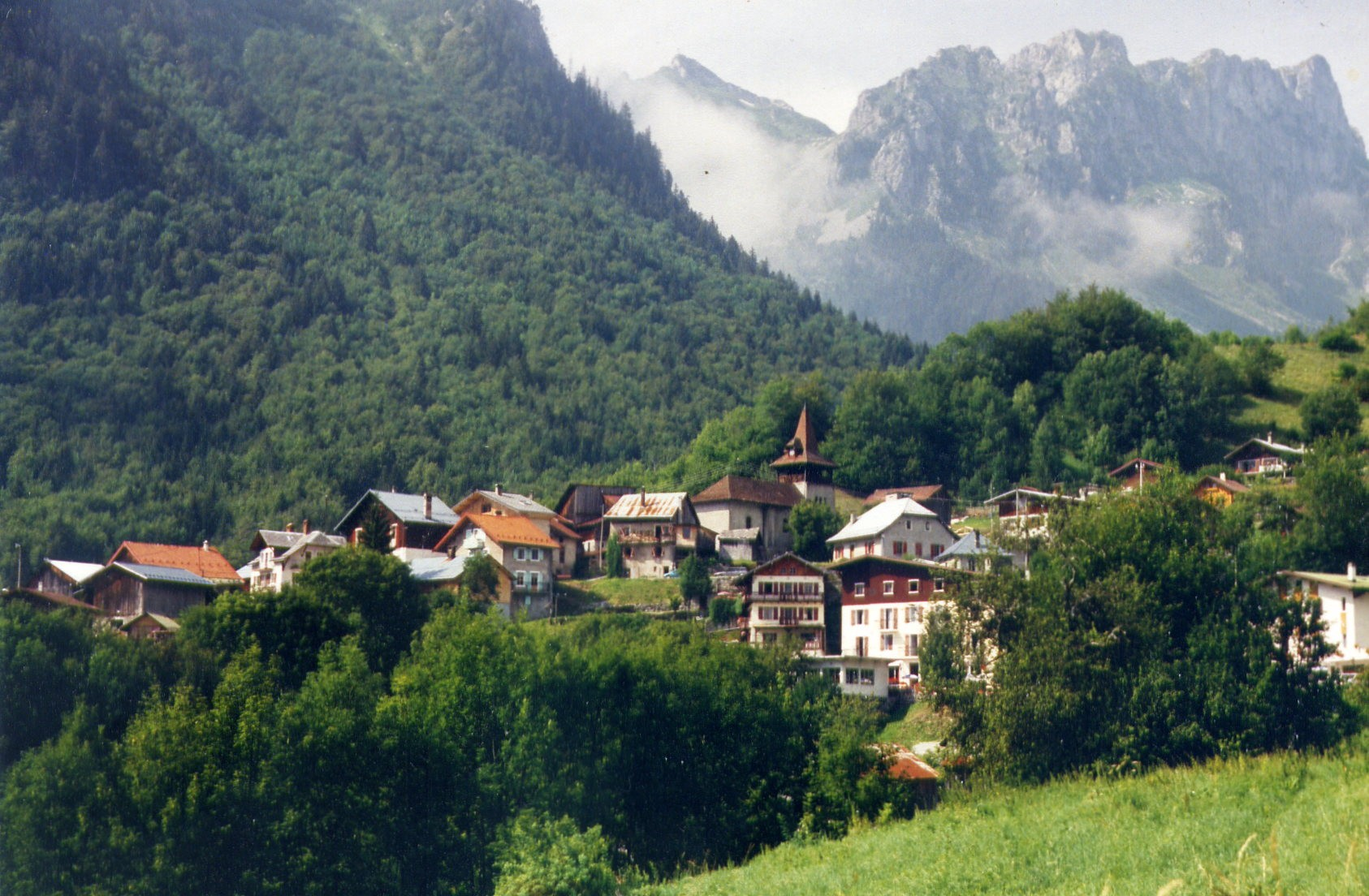
- A panoramic view of the village

- Coat of arms
- Location of Novel
- Location within France Location within Auvergne-Rhône-Alpes
- Coordinates: 46°22′13″N 6°47′15″E
- Country: France
- Region: Auvergne-Rhône-Alpes
- Department: Haute-Savoie
- Arrondissement: Thonon-les-Bains
- Canton: Évian-les-Bains
- Intercommunality: Pays d'Évian Vallée d'Abondance

Government
  - Mayor (2020–2026): Corinne Delot
- Area^{1}: 9.75 km^{2} (3.76 sq mi)
- Highest elevation: 2,180 m (7,150 ft)
- Lowest elevation: 780 m (2,560 ft)
- Population (2023): 55
  - Density: 5.6/km^{2} (15/sq mi)
- Demonym: Novellands
- Time zone: UTC+01:00 (CET)
  - Summer (DST): UTC+02:00 (CEST)
- INSEE/Postal code: 74203 /74500
- ^{1} French Land Register data, which excludes lakes, ponds, glaciers > 1 km^{2} (0.386 sq mi or 247 acres) and river estuaries.

Novel (French pronunciation: [nɔvɛl]; Arpitan: Nové) is a commune in the Haute-Savoie department in the Auvergne-Rhône-Alpes region in south-eastern France.

== See also ==
- Communes of the Haute-Savoie department
