= Champanges =

Champanges Champenjo (Arpitan)
- Commune
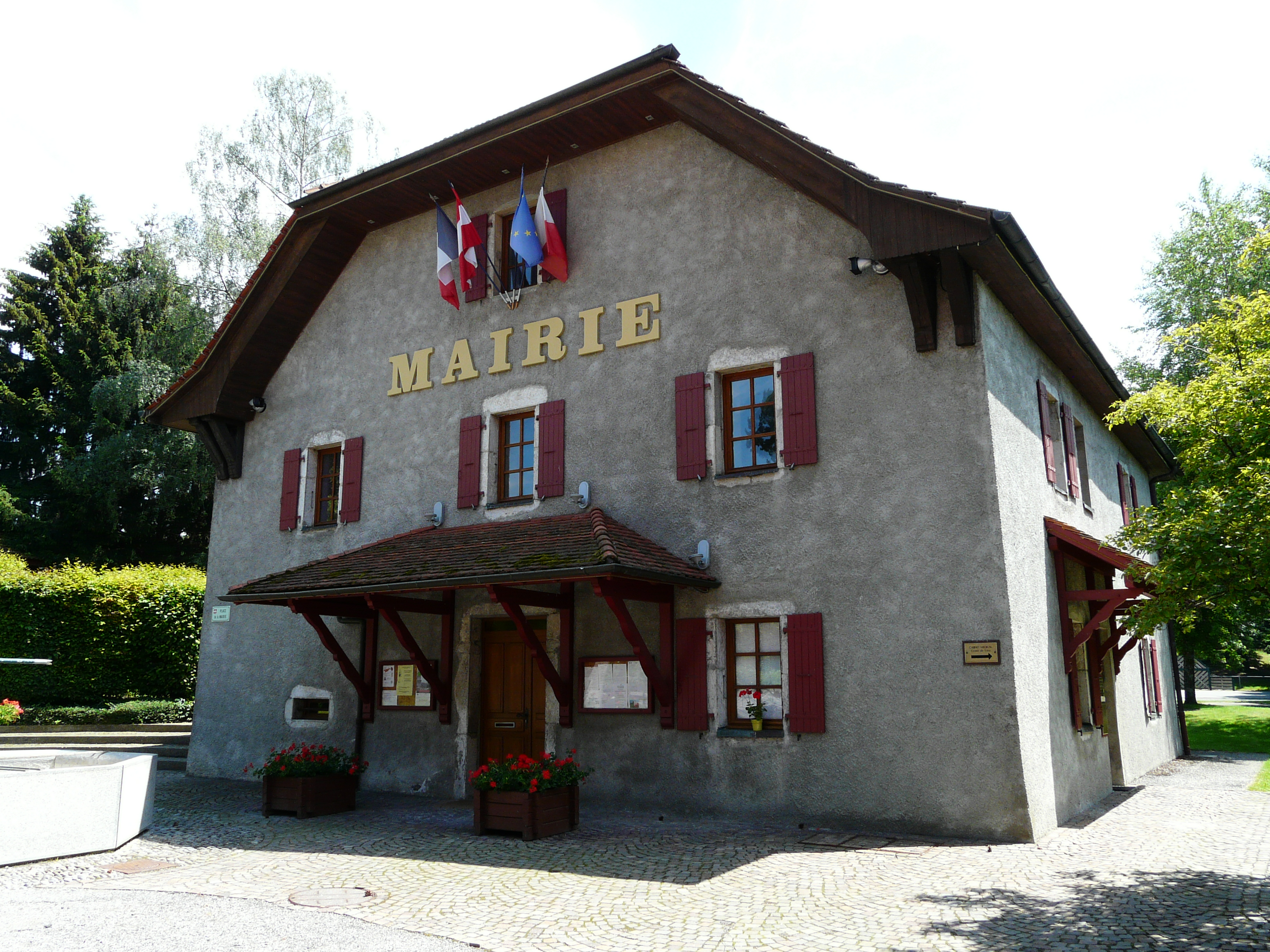
- Town Hall

- Coat of arms
- Location of Champanges
- Location within France Location within Auvergne-Rhône-Alpes
- Coordinates: 46°22′14″N 6°33′05″E
- Country: France
- Region: Auvergne-Rhône-Alpes
- Department: Haute-Savoie
- Arrondissement: Thonon-les-Bains
- Canton: Évian-les-Bains
- Intercommunality: Pays d'Évian Vallée d'Abondance

Government
  - Mayor (2020–2026): Rénato Gobber
- Area^{1}: 3.71 km^{2} (1.43 sq mi)
- Highest elevation: 782 m (2,566 ft)
- Lowest elevation: 640 m (2,100 ft)
- Population (2023): 1,208
  - Density: 326/km^{2} (843/sq mi)
- Demonym: Champangeois
- Time zone: UTC+01:00 (CET)
  - Summer (DST): UTC+02:00 (CEST)
- INSEE/Postal code: 74057 /74500
- Website: champanges.fr
- ^{1} French Land Register data, which excludes lakes, ponds, glaciers > 1 km^{2} (0.386 sq mi or 247 acres) and river estuaries.

Champanges (French pronunciation: [ʃɑ̃pɑ̃ʒ]; Arpitan: Champenjo) is a commune in the Haute-Savoie department in the Auvergne-Rhône-Alpes region in south-eastern France. An Alpine community, with a tourist and camping industry, it is close to Lake Leman and the French-Swiss border.

== See also ==
- Communes of the Haute-Savoie department
