= Lyaud =

Le Lyaud
- Commune
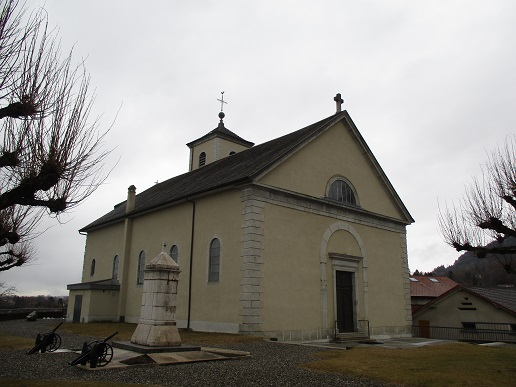
- Church of Saint-Nicolas

- Coat of arms
- Location of Le Lyaud
- Location within France Location within Auvergne-Rhône-Alpes
- Coordinates: 46°20′17″N 6°31′22″E
- Country: France
- Region: Auvergne-Rhône-Alpes
- Department: Haute-Savoie
- Arrondissement: Thonon-les-Bains
- Canton: Thonon-les-Bains
- Intercommunality: Thonon Agglomération

Government
  - Mayor (2020–2026): Joseph Deage
- Area^{1}: 9.17 km^{2} (3.54 sq mi)
- Highest elevation: 1,413 m (4,636 ft)
- Lowest elevation: 440 m (1,440 ft)
- Population (2023): 1,780
  - Density: 194/km^{2} (503/sq mi)
- Time zone: UTC+01:00 (CET)
  - Summer (DST): UTC+02:00 (CEST)
- INSEE/Postal code: 74157 /74200
- ^{1} French Land Register data, which excludes lakes, ponds, glaciers > 1 km^{2} (0.386 sq mi or 247 acres) and river estuaries.

Lyaud is a commune in the Haute-Savoie department in the Auvergne-Rhône-Alpes region in south-eastern France.

== See also ==
- Communes of the Haute-Savoie department
