= Neuvecelle =

- Commune
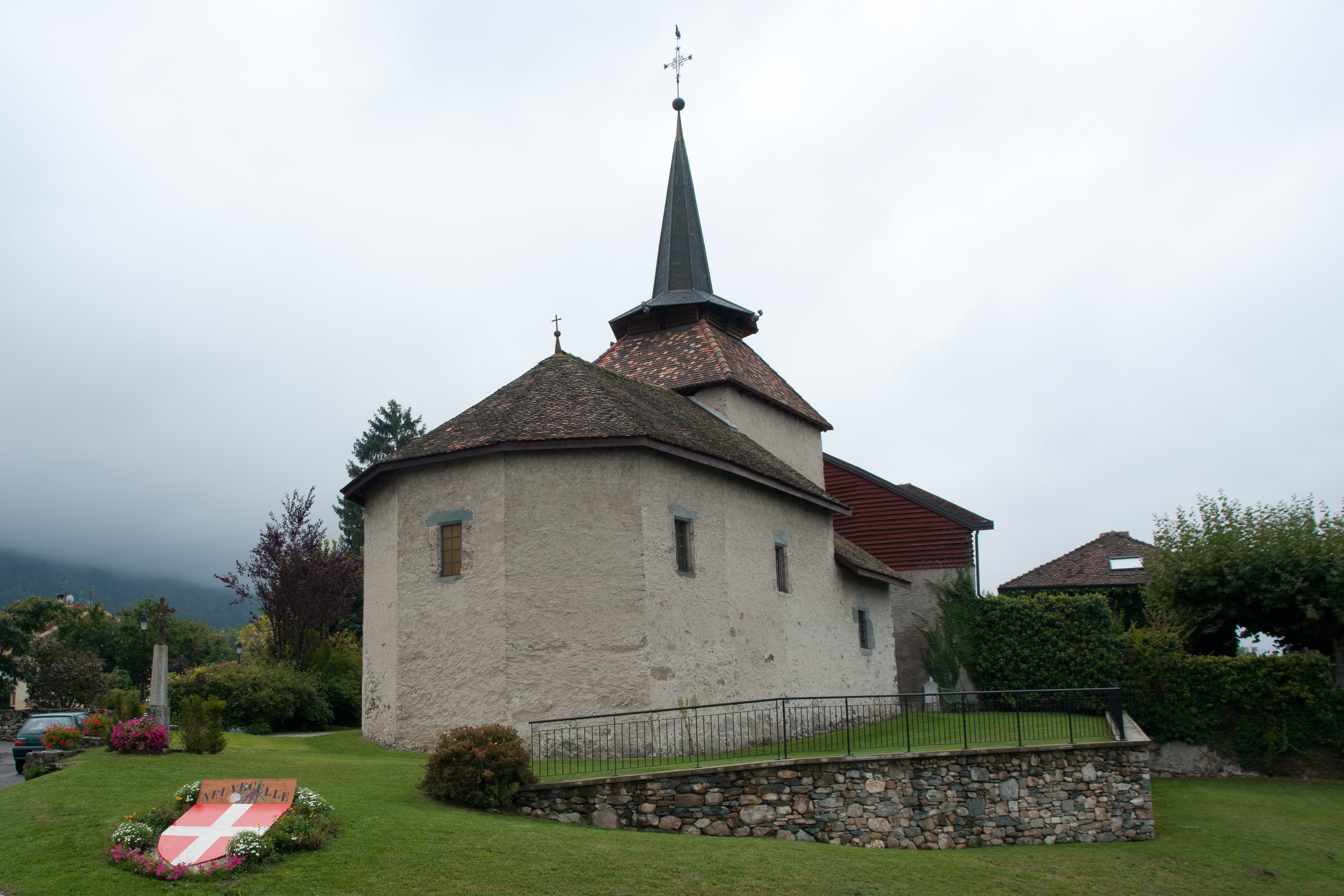
- The Chapel of Maraîche, in Neuvecelle

- Coat of arms
- Location of Neuvecelle
- Location within France Location within Auvergne-Rhône-Alpes
- Coordinates: 46°24′00″N 6°36′00″E
- Country: France
- Region: Auvergne-Rhône-Alpes
- Department: Haute-Savoie
- Arrondissement: Thonon-les-Bains
- Canton: Évian-les-Bains
- Intercommunality: Pays d'Évian Vallée d'Abondance

Government
  - Mayor (2022–2026): Nadine Wendling
- Area^{1}: 4 km^{2} (1.5 sq mi)
- Highest elevation: 770 m (2,530 ft)
- Lowest elevation: 372 m (1,220 ft)
- Population (2023): 3,256
  - Density: 810/km^{2} (2,100/sq mi)
- Demonym: Neuvecellois / Neuvecelloises
- Time zone: UTC+01:00 (CET)
  - Summer (DST): UTC+02:00 (CEST)
- INSEE/Postal code: 74200 /74500
- ^{1} French Land Register data, which excludes lakes, ponds, glaciers > 1 km^{2} (0.386 sq mi or 247 acres) and river estuaries.

Neuvecelle (French pronunciation: [nœvsɛl]; Arpitan: Nuvassala) is a commune in the Haute-Savoie department and Auvergne-Rhône-Alpes region of eastern France.

== Population ==
Historical population
Year	Pop.	±% p.a.
1968	984	—
1975	1,288	+3.92%
1982	1,559	+2.77%
1990	1,949	+2.83%
1999	2,211	+1.41%
2007	2,520	+1.65%
2012	2,750	+1.76%
2017	3,048	+2.08%
2023	3,256	+1.11%
Source: INSEE

== See also ==
- Communes of the Haute-Savoie department
