= Bonnevaux, Haute-Savoie =

Bonnevaux Bounavô (Arpitan)
- Commune
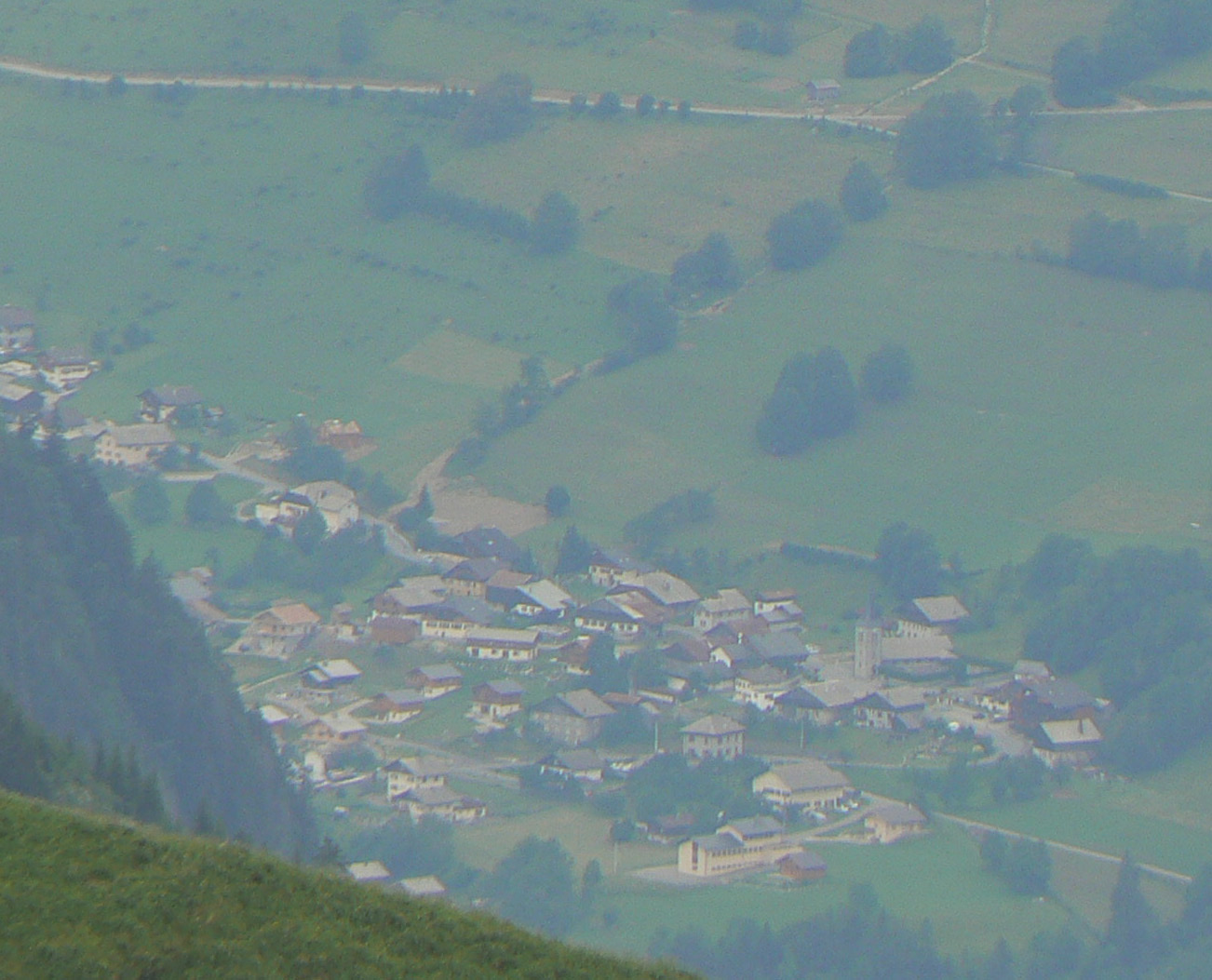
- Bonnevaux seen from the nearby mountainside
- Location of Bonnevaux
- Location within France Location within Auvergne-Rhône-Alpes
- Coordinates: 46°17′51″N 6°40′16″E
- Country: France
- Region: Auvergne-Rhône-Alpes
- Department: Haute-Savoie
- Arrondissement: Thonon-les-Bains
- Canton: Évian-les-Bains
- Intercommunality: Pays d'Évian Vallée d'Abondance

Government
  - Mayor (2020–2026): Gérard Colomer
- Area^{1}: 7.82 km^{2} (3.02 sq mi)
- Highest elevation: 1,870 m (6,140 ft)
- Lowest elevation: 799 m (2,621 ft)
- Population (2023): 284
  - Density: 36.3/km^{2} (94.1/sq mi)
- Time zone: UTC+01:00 (CET)
  - Summer (DST): UTC+02:00 (CEST)
- INSEE/Postal code: 74041 /74360
- ^{1} French Land Register data, which excludes lakes, ponds, glaciers > 1 km^{2} (0.386 sq mi or 247 acres) and river estuaries.

Bonnevaux (French pronunciation: [bɔnvo]; Arpitan: Bounavô) is a commune in the Haute-Savoie department in the Auvergne-Rhône-Alpes region in south-eastern France.

== See also ==
- Communes of the Haute-Savoie department
