= Chevenoz =

Chevenoz Shvèno (Savoyard)
- Commune
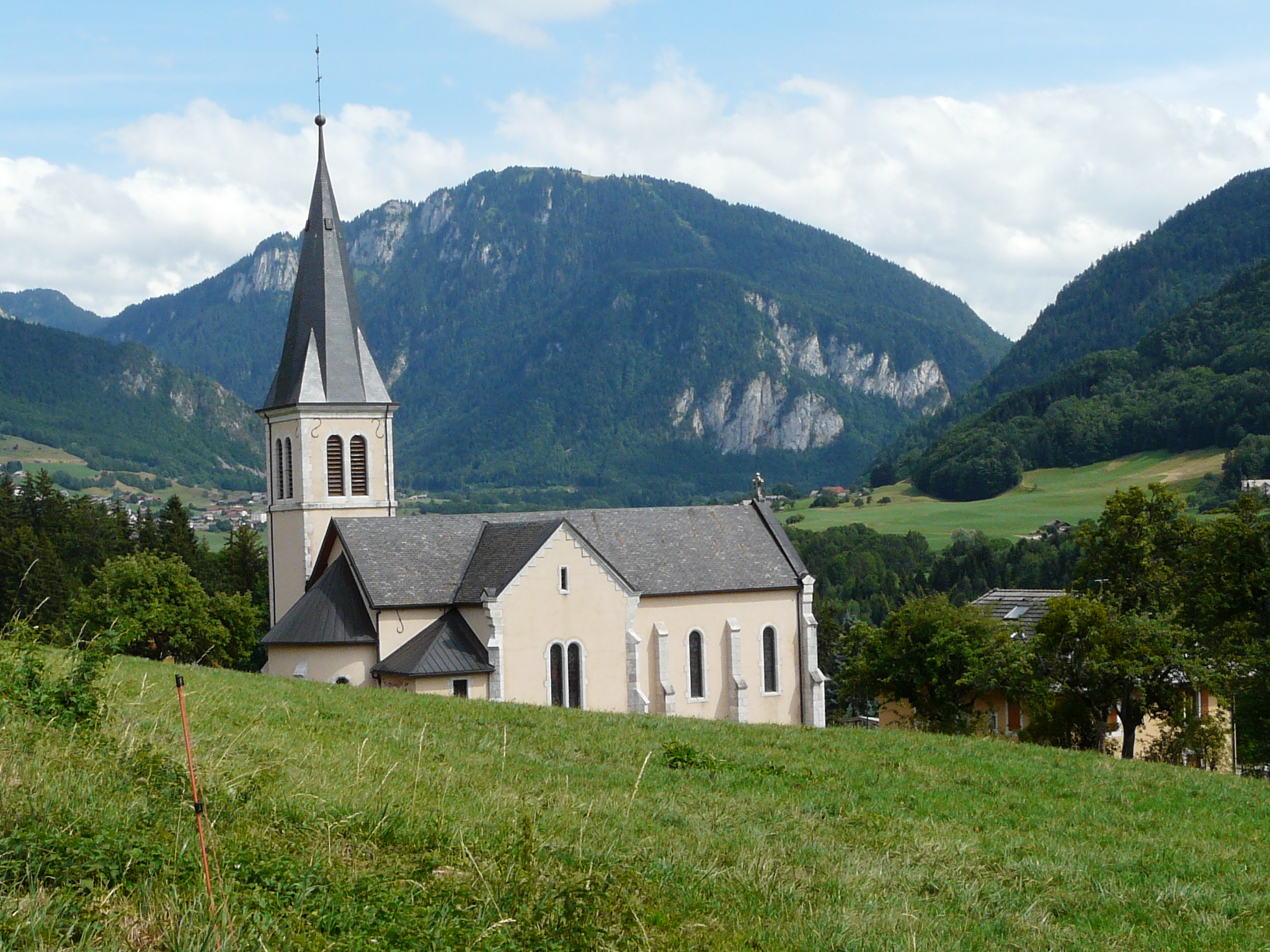
- Church of Saint-Jean-Baptiste
- Location of Chevenoz
- Location within France Location within Auvergne-Rhône-Alpes
- Coordinates: 46°20′25″N 6°38′22″E
- Country: France
- Region: Auvergne-Rhône-Alpes
- Department: Haute-Savoie
- Arrondissement: Thonon-les-Bains
- Canton: Évian-les-Bains
- Intercommunality: Pays d'Évian Vallée d'Abondance

Government
  - Mayor (2020–2026): Karole Bontaz
- Area^{1}: 10.54 km^{2} (4.07 sq mi)
- Highest elevation: 1,627 m (5,338 ft)
- Lowest elevation: 560 m (1,840 ft)
- Population (2023): 709
  - Density: 67.3/km^{2} (174/sq mi)
- Time zone: UTC+01:00 (CET)
  - Summer (DST): UTC+02:00 (CEST)
- INSEE/Postal code: 74073 /74500
- ^{1} French Land Register data, which excludes lakes, ponds, glaciers > 1 km^{2} (0.386 sq mi or 247 acres) and river estuaries.

Chevenoz (Savoyard: Shvèno) is a commune in the Haute-Savoie department in the Auvergne-Rhône-Alpes region in south-eastern France.

== Toponymy ==
As with many polysyllabic Arpitan toponyms or anthroponyms, the final -x marks oxytonic stress (on the last syllable), whereas the final -z indicates paroxytonic stress (on the penultimate syllable) and should not be pronounced, although in French it is often mispronounced due to hypercorrection.

== See also ==
- Communes of the Haute-Savoie department
