= Publier =

- Commune
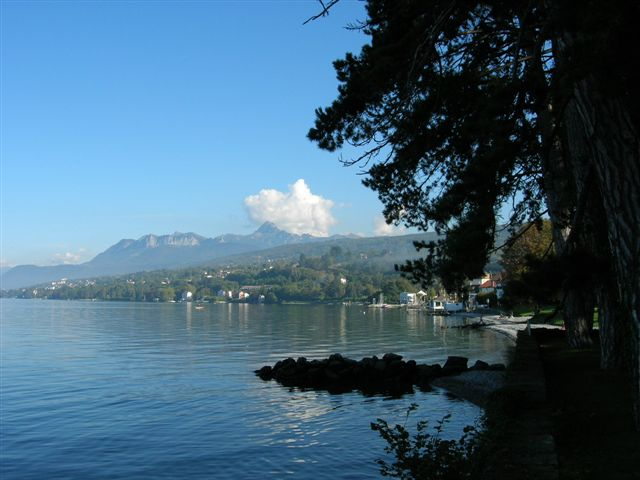
- A view of the bay of Amphion from the park of cedars

- Coat of arms
- Location of Publier
- Location within France Location within Auvergne-Rhône-Alpes
- Coordinates: 46°23′20″N 6°32′42″E
- Country: France
- Region: Auvergne-Rhône-Alpes
- Department: Haute-Savoie
- Arrondissement: Thonon-les-Bains
- Canton: Évian-les-Bains
- Intercommunality: CC Pays d'Évian Vallée d'Abondance

Government
  - Mayor (2020–2026): Jacques Grandchamp
- Area^{1}: 8.92 km^{2} (3.44 sq mi)
- Highest elevation: 721 m (2,365 ft)
- Lowest elevation: 372 m (1,220 ft)
- Population (2023): 7,864
  - Density: 882/km^{2} (2,280/sq mi)
- Demonym: Publiérains / Amphionnais
- Time zone: UTC+01:00 (CET)
  - Summer (DST): UTC+02:00 (CEST)
- INSEE/Postal code: 74218 /74500
- Website: Ville-publier.fr
- ^{1} French Land Register data, which excludes lakes, ponds, glaciers > 1 km^{2} (0.386 sq mi or 247 acres) and river estuaries.

Publier (French pronunciation: [pyblije]) is a French commune located in the Haute -Savoie department, in the Auvergne-Rhône-Alpes region. It is located in the French Chablais, on Lake Geneva, between Thonon-les-Bains to the west and Évian-les-Bains to the east, and opposite Morges and Lausanne in Switzerland. With 7,864 inhabitants in January 1 2023, it has experienced strong demographic growth with about +2% per year since 1999.

It is a climatic and tourist resort, particularly in summer thanks to its privileged geographical location and its beach, as well as its modern and diversified sports infrastructure.

The commune includes the main town of Publier, a village located upstream on a plateau offering a panorama over the entire Lake Geneva basin and surrounded by numerous hamlets, and Amphion-les-Bains, a seaside resort on the edge of the lake.

This ancient spa resort was very fashionable under the Second Empire, and was frequented in its time by the Sardinian court and the princes of Savoy who came to enjoy its alkaline, ferruginous and sulphurous waters. The international development of its neighbour Évian-les-Bains overshadowed it, and thermal baths are no longer practiced there today.

== Population ==
Historical population
Year	Pop.	±% p.a.
1968	2,390	—
1975	2,755	+2.05%
1982	3,701	+4.31%
1990	4,312	+1.93%
1999	4,954	+1.55%
2007	6,032	+2.49%
2012	6,506	+1.52%
2017	7,148	+1.90%
2023	7,864	+1.60%
Source: INSEE

== See also ==
- Communes of the Haute-Savoie department
