= Seytroux =

Seytroux Sêtro (Arpitan)
- Commune
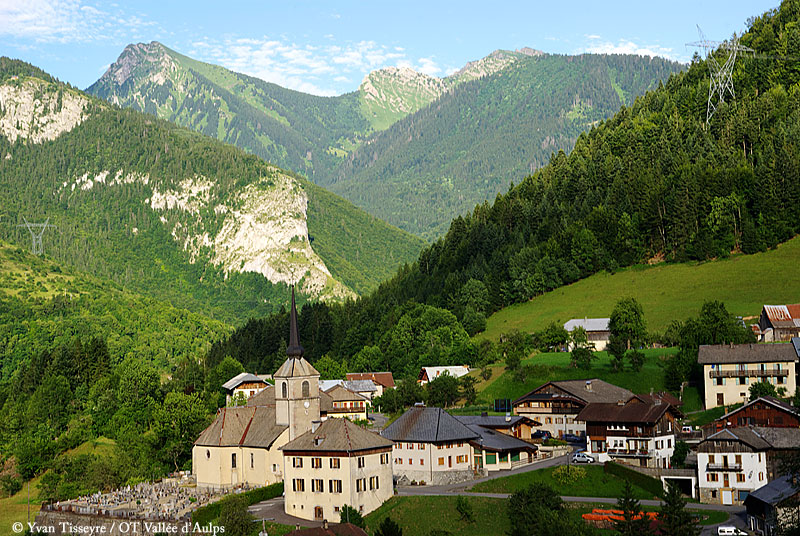
- The village of Seytroux
- Location of Seytroux
- Location within France Location within Auvergne-Rhône-Alpes
- Coordinates: 46°15′00″N 6°37′05″E
- Country: France
- Region: Auvergne-Rhône-Alpes
- Department: Haute-Savoie
- Arrondissement: Thonon-les-Bains
- Canton: Évian-les-Bains
- Intercommunality: Haut-Chablais

Government
  - Mayor (2020–2026): Jean-Claude Morand
- Area^{1}: 18.44 km^{2} (7.12 sq mi)
- Highest elevation: 1,802 m (5,912 ft)
- Lowest elevation: 691 m (2,267 ft)
- Population (2023): 538
  - Density: 29.2/km^{2} (75.6/sq mi)
- Demonym: Seytrousiens / Seytrousiennes
- Time zone: UTC+01:00 (CET)
  - Summer (DST): UTC+02:00 (CEST)
- INSEE/Postal code: 74271 /74430
- ^{1} French Land Register data, which excludes lakes, ponds, glaciers > 1 km^{2} (0.386 sq mi or 247 acres) and river estuaries.

Seytroux (Arpitan: Sêtro) is a commune in the Haute-Savoie department in the Auvergne-Rhône-Alpes region in south-eastern France.

== See also ==
- Communes of the Haute-Savoie department
