= Saint-Paul-en-Chablais =

- Commune
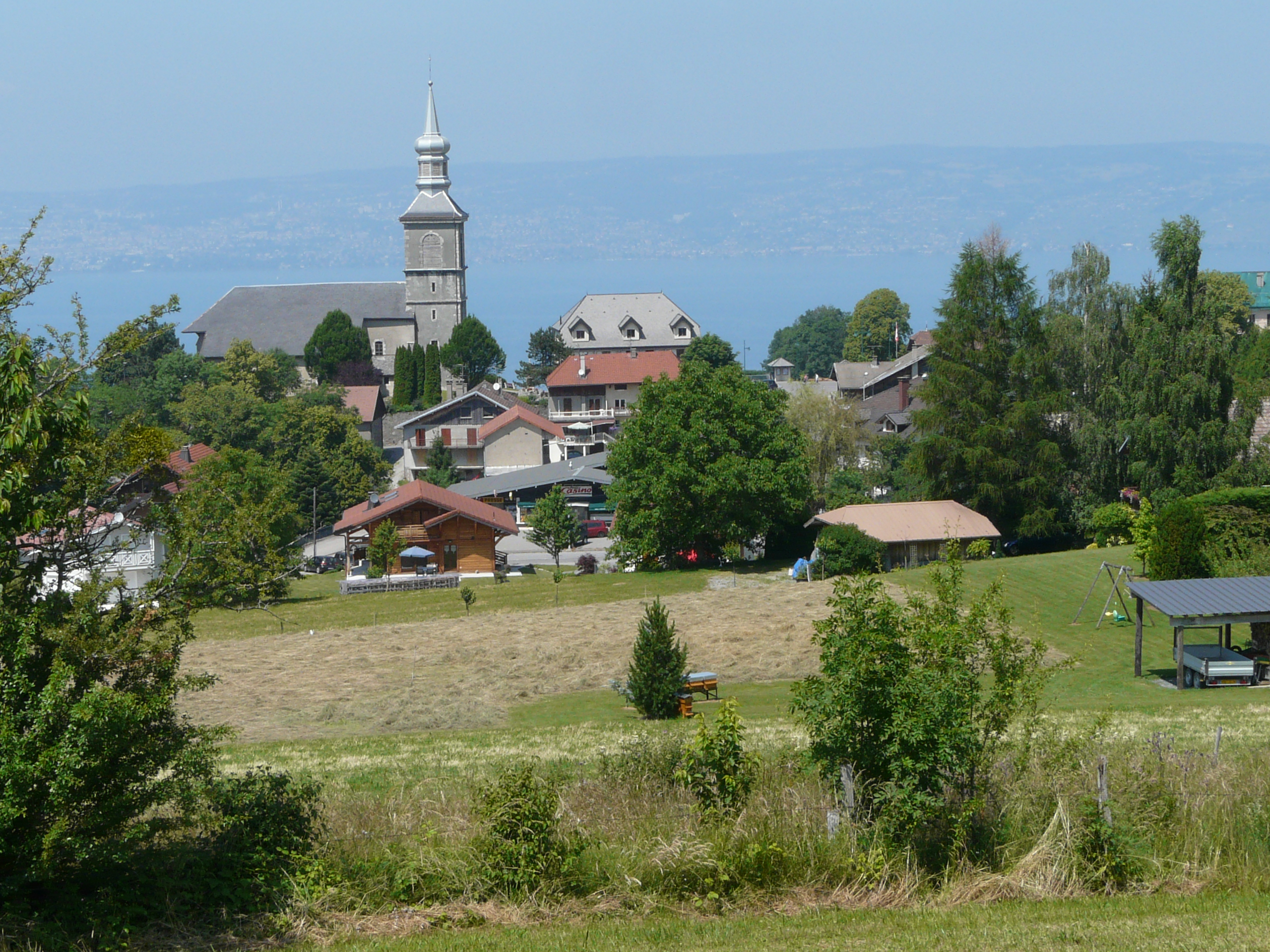
- A general view of the area looking toward Lake Geneva

- Coat of arms
- Location of Saint-Paul-en-Chablais
- Location within France Location within Auvergne-Rhône-Alpes
- Coordinates: 46°22′46″N 6°37′51″E
- Country: France
- Region: Auvergne-Rhône-Alpes
- Department: Haute-Savoie
- Arrondissement: Thonon-les-Bains
- Canton: Évian-les-Bains
- Intercommunality: Pays d'Évian Vallée d'Abondance

Government
  - Mayor (2020–2026): Bruno Gillet
- Area^{1}: 14.45 km^{2} (5.58 sq mi)
- Highest elevation: 1,268 m (4,160 ft)
- Lowest elevation: 698 m (2,290 ft)
- Population (2023): 2,613
  - Density: 180.8/km^{2} (468.3/sq mi)
- Time zone: UTC+01:00 (CET)
  - Summer (DST): UTC+02:00 (CEST)
- INSEE/Postal code: 74249 /74500
- Website: Saintpaulenchablais.fr
- ^{1} French Land Register data, which excludes lakes, ponds, glaciers > 1 km^{2} (0.386 sq mi or 247 acres) and river estuaries.

Saint-Paul-en-Chablais (French pronunciation: [sɛ̃ pɔl ɑ̃ ʃablɛ], lit. 'Saint-Paul in Chablais') is a commune in the Haute-Savoie department in the Auvergne-Rhône-Alpes region in south-eastern France.

== Population ==
Historical population
Year	Pop.	±% p.a.
1968	848	—
1975	875	+0.45%
1982	992	+1.81%
1990	1,400	+4.40%
1999	1,703	+2.20%
2007	2,060	+2.41%
2012	2,219	+1.50%
2017	2,412	+1.68%
2023	2,613	+1.34%
Source: INSEE

== See also ==
- Communes of the Haute-Savoie department
