= Saint-André-de-Boëge =

- Commune
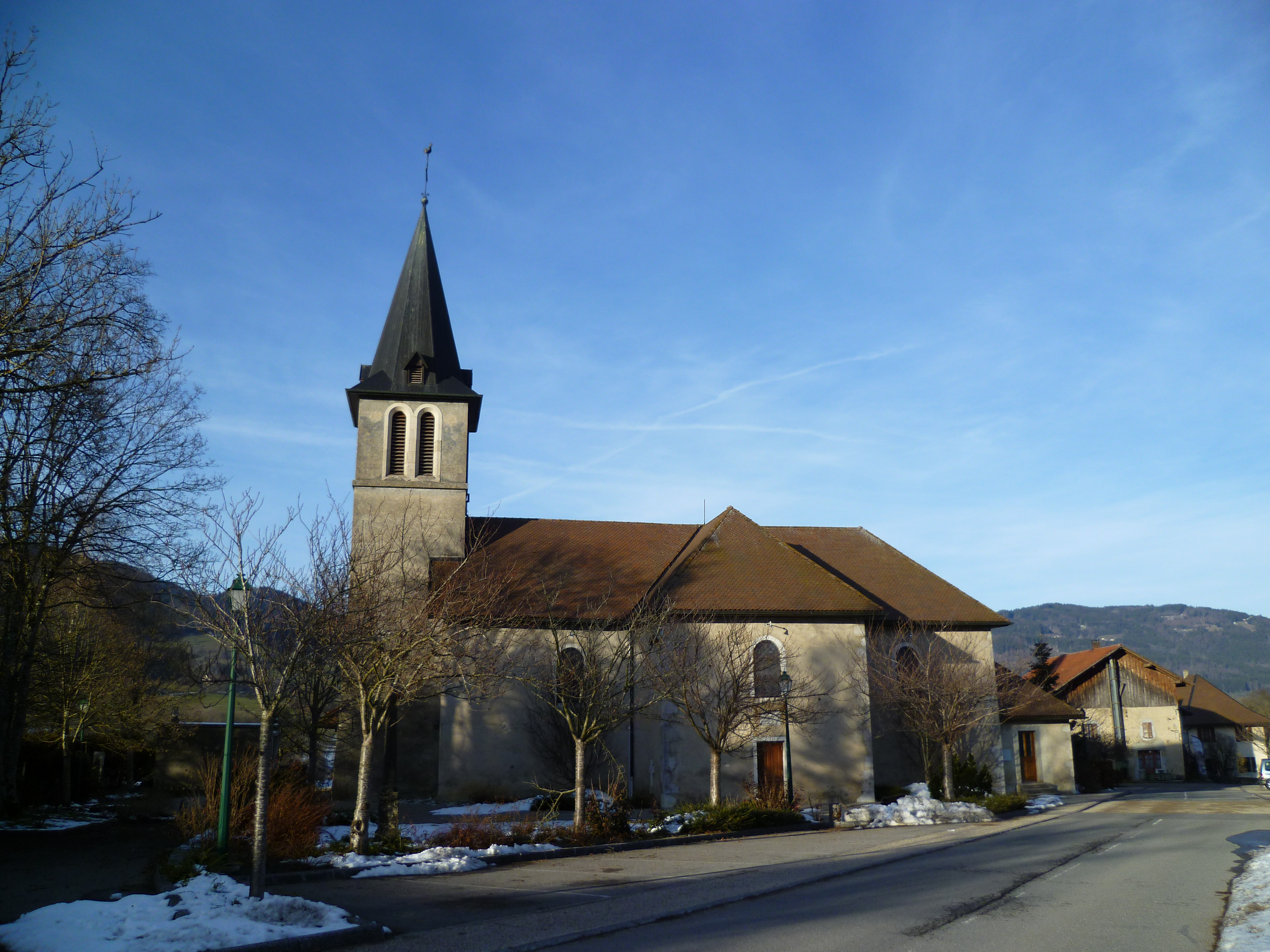
- The church in Saint-André-de-Boëge

- Coat of arms
- Location of Saint-André-de-Boëge
- Location within France Location within Auvergne-Rhône-Alpes
- Coordinates: 46°11′28″N 6°23′40″E
- Country: France
- Region: Auvergne-Rhône-Alpes
- Department: Haute-Savoie
- Arrondissement: Thonon-les-Bains
- Canton: Sciez

Government
  - Mayor (2020–2026): Jean-François Bosson
- Area^{1}: 12.6 km^{2} (4.9 sq mi)
- Highest elevation: 1,440 m (4,720 ft)
- Lowest elevation: 640 m (2,100 ft)
- Population (2023): 597
  - Density: 47.4/km^{2} (123/sq mi)
- Time zone: UTC+01:00 (CET)
  - Summer (DST): UTC+02:00 (CEST)
- INSEE/Postal code: 74226 /74420
- ^{1} French Land Register data, which excludes lakes, ponds, glaciers > 1 km^{2} (0.386 sq mi or 247 acres) and river estuaries.

Saint-André-de-Boëge (French pronunciation: [sɛ̃.t‿ɑ̃dʁe də bɔɛʒ], literally Saint-André of Boëge; Arpitan: Sant-Andri) is a commune in the Haute-Savoie department in the Auvergne-Rhône-Alpes region in south-eastern France.

== See also ==
- Communes of the Haute-Savoie department
