= Communes of the Haute-Savoie department =

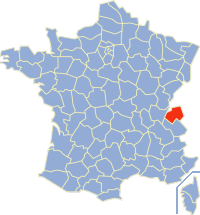

The following is a list of the 279 communes of the French department of Haute-Savoie.

The communes cooperate in the following intercommunalities (as of 2025):

- Annemasse - Les Voirons Agglomération
- Communauté d'agglomération du Grand Annecy
- CA Thonon Agglomération
- Communauté de communes Arve et Salève
- Communauté de communes Cluses-Arve et Montagnes
- Communauté de communes Faucigny-Glières
- Communauté de communes Fier et Usses
- Communauté de communes du Genevois
- Communauté de communes du Haut-Chablais
- Communauté de communes des Montagnes du Giffre
- Communauté de communes du Pays de Cruseilles
- Communauté de communes Pays d'Évian Vallée d'Abondance
- Communauté de communes Pays du Mont-Blanc
- Communauté de communes du Pays Rochois
- Communauté de communes des Quatre Rivières
- Communauté de communes Rumilly Terre de Savoie
- Communauté de communes des Sources du Lac d'Annecy
- Communauté de communes Usses et Rhône (partly)
- Communauté de communes de la Vallée de Chamonix-Mont-Blanc
- Communauté de communes de la Vallée Verte
- Communauté de communes des Vallées de Thônes

INSEE code	Postal code	Commune
74001	74360	Abondance
74002	74540	Alby-sur-Chéran
74003	74290	Alex
74004	74540	Allèves
74005	74200	Allinges
74006	74350	Allonzier-la-Caille
74007	74800	Amancy
74008	74100	Ambilly
74009	74350	Andilly
74010	74000	Annecy
74012	74100	Annemasse
74013	74200	Anthy-sur-Léman
74014	74300	Arâches-la-Frasse
74015	74930	Arbusigny
74016	74160	Archamps
74018	74800	Arenthon
74019	74370	Argonay
74020	74200	Armoy
74021	74380	Arthaz-Pont-Notre-Dame
74024	74130	Ayse
74025	74140	Ballaison
74026	74330	La Balme-de-Sillingy
74027	74230	La Balme-de-Thuy
74029	74910	Bassy
74030	74430	La Baume
74031	74160	Beaumont
74032	74470	Bellevaux
74033	74500	Bernex
74034	74430	Le Biot
74035	74150	Bloye
74036	74290	Bluffy
74037	74420	Boëge
74038	74250	Bogève
74040	74380	Bonne
74041	74360	Bonnevaux
74042	74130	Bonneville
74043	74890	Bons-en-Chablais
74044	74160	Bossey
74045	74230	Le Bouchet-Mont-Charvin
74046	74150	Boussy
74048	74890	Brenthonne
74049	74130	Brizon
74050	74420	Burdignin
74051	74350	Cercier
74052	74350	Cernex
74053	74550	Cervens
74054	74540	Chainaz-les-Frasses
74055	74910	Challonges
74056	74400	Chamonix-Mont-Blanc
74057	74500	Champanges
74061	74540	Chapeiry
74058	74360	La Chapelle-d'Abondance
74059	74800	La Chapelle-Rambaud
74060	74410	La Chapelle-Saint-Maurice
74062	74370	Charvonnex
74063	74390	Châtel
74064	74300	Châtillon-sur-Cluses
74065	74270	Chaumont
74066	74270	Chavannaz
74067	74650	Chavanod
74068	74270	Chêne-en-Semine
74069	74520	Chênex
74070	74140	Chens-sur-Léman
74071	74270	Chessenaz
74072	74210	Chevaline
74073	74500	Chevenoz
74074	74520	Chevrier
74075	74270	Chilly
74076	74330	Choisy
74077	74270	Clarafond-Arcine
74079	74230	Les Clefs
74078	74270	Clermont
74080	74220	La Clusaz
74081	74300	Cluses
74082	74160	Collonges-sous-Salève
74083	74920	Combloux
74086	74270	Contamine-Sarzin
74085	74170	Les Contamines-Montjoie
74087	74130	Contamine-sur-Arve
74088	74350	Copponex
74089	74700	Cordon
74090	74800	Cornier
74091	74110	La Côte-d'Arbroz
74094	74380	Cranves-Sales
74095	74150	Crempigny-Bonneguête
74096	74350	Cruseilles
74097	74540	Cusy
74098	74350	Cuvat
74099	74120	Demi-Quartier
74100	74270	Desingy
74101	74520	Dingy-en-Vuache
74102	74230	Dingy-Saint-Clair
74103	74700	Domancy
74104	74210	Doussard
74105	74140	Douvaine
74106	74550	Draillant
74107	74270	Droisy
74108	74410	Duingt
74109	01200	Éloise
74111	74410	Entrevernes
74112	74330	Épagny-Metz-Tessy
74114	74110	Essert-Romand
74116	74800	Eteaux
74117	74150	Étercy
74118	74100	Étrembières
74119	74500	Évian-les-Bains
74121	74140	Excenevex
74122	74130	Faucigny
74123	74210	Faverges-Seythenex
74124	74160	Feigères
74126	74890	Fessy
74127	74500	Féternes
74282	74570	Fillière
74128	74250	Fillinges
74129	74200	La Forclaz
74130	74910	Franclens
74131	74270	Frangy
74133	74240	Gaillard
74134	74260	Les Gets
74135	74210	Giez
74212	74130	Glières-Val-de-Borne
74136	74450	Le Grand-Bornand
74137	74570	Groisy
74138	74540	Gruffy
74139	74420	Habère-Lullin
74140	74420	Habère-Poche
74141	74150	Hauteville-sur-Fier
74142	74540	Héry-sur-Alby
74143	74310	Les Houches
74144	74520	Jonzier-Épagny
74145	74100	Juvigny
74146	74500	Larringes
74147	74210	Lathuile
74148	74320	Leschaux
74150	74140	Loisin
74151	74150	Lornay
74152	74330	Lovagny
74153	74380	Lucinges
74154	74500	Lugrin
74155	74470	Lullin
74156	74890	Lully
74157	74200	Lyaud
74158	74140	Machilly

INSEE code	Postal code	Commune
74159	74300	Magland
74160	74230	Manigod
74162	74250	Marcellaz
74161	74150	Marcellaz-Albanais
74163	74200	Margencel
74164	74970	Marignier
74165	74150	Marigny-Saint-Marcel
74166	74200	Marin
74168	74270	Marlioz
74169	74460	Marnaz
74170	74150	Massingy
74171	74140	Massongy
74172	74500	Maxilly-sur-Léman
74173	74120	Megève
74174	74490	Mégevette
74175	74500	Meillerie
74177	74350	Menthonnex-en-Bornes
74178	74270	Menthonnex-sous-Clermont
74176	74290	Menthon-Saint-Bernard
74179	74330	Mésigny
74180	74140	Messery
74183	74440	Mieussy
74184	74270	Minzier
74185	74560	Monnetier-Mornex
74186	74600	Montagny-les-Lanches
74188	74110	Montriond
74189	74130	Mont-Saxonnex
74190	74440	Morillon
74191	74110	Morzine
74192	74150	Moye
74193	74560	La Muraz
74194	74540	Mûres
74195	74270	Musièges
74196	74300	Nancy-sur-Cluses
74197	74380	Nangy
74198	74370	Nâves-Parmelan
74199	74140	Nernier
74200	74500	Neuvecelle
74201	74160	Neydens
74202	74330	Nonglard
74203	74500	Novel
74205	74490	Onnion
74206	74550	Orcier
74208	74190	Passy
74209	74250	Peillonnex
74210	74550	Perrignier
74211	74930	Pers-Jussy
74213	74330	Poisy
74215	74120	Praz-sur-Arly
74216	74160	Présilly
74218	74500	Publier
74219	74600	Quintal
74220	74930	Reignier-Esery
74221	74950	Le Reposoir
74222	74200	Reyvroz
74223	74440	La Rivière-Enverse
74224	74800	La Roche-sur-Foron
74225	74150	Rumilly
74226	74420	Saint-André-de-Boëge
74228	74350	Saint-Blaise
74229	74140	Saint-Cergues
74231	74150	Saint-Eusèbe
74232	74410	Saint-Eustache
74233	74540	Saint-Félix
74234	74210	Saint-Ferréol
74235	74910	Saint-Germain-sur-Rhône
74236	74170	Saint-Gervais-les-Bains
74237	74500	Saint-Gingolph
74238	74430	Saint-Jean-d'Aulps
74239	74450	Saint-Jean-de-Sixt
74240	74250	Saint-Jean-de-Tholome
74241	74490	Saint-Jeoire
74242	74410	Saint-Jorioz
74243	74160	Saint-Julien-en-Genevois
74244	74800	Saint-Laurent
74249	74500	Saint-Paul-en-Chablais
74250	74800	Saint-Pierre-en-Faucigny
74252	74300	Saint-Sigismond
74253	74800	Saint-Sixt
74254	74540	Saint-Sylvestre
74255	74150	Sales
74256	74700	Sallanches
74257	74270	Sallenôves
74258	74340	Samoëns
74259	74350	Le Sappey
74260	74520	Savigny
74261	74420	Saxel
74262	74930	Scientrier
74263	74140	Sciez
74264	74950	Scionzier
74265	74230	Serraval
74266	74310	Servoz
74267	74320	Sevrier
74269	74910	Seyssel
74271	74430	Seytroux
74272	74330	Sillingy
74273	74740	Sixt-Fer-à-Cheval
74275	74290	Talloires-Montmin
74276	74440	Taninges
74279	74500	Thollon-les-Mémises
74280	74230	Thônes
74281	74200	Thonon-les-Bains
74283	74150	Thusy
74278	74300	Thyez
74284	74250	La Tour
74285	74910	Usinens
74286	74360	Vacheresse
74287	74470	Vailly
74167	74210	Val-de-Chaise
74288	74520	Valleiry
74289	74150	Vallières-sur-Fier
74290	74660	Vallorcine
74291	74270	Vanzy
74292	74150	Vaulx
74293	74140	Veigy-Foncenex
74294	74440	Verchaix
74295	74200	La Vernaz
74296	74160	Vers
74297	74150	Versonnex
74298	74100	Vétraz-Monthoux
74299	74290	Veyrier-du-Lac
74301	74420	Villard
74302	74230	Les Villards-sur-Thônes
74303	74370	Villaz
74304	74250	Ville-en-Sallaz
74305	74100	Ville-la-Grand
74306	74350	Villy-le-Bouveret
74307	74350	Villy-le-Pelloux
74308	74500	Vinzier
74309	74580	Viry
74311	74250	Viuz-en-Sallaz
74310	74540	Viuz-la-Chiésaz
74312	74130	Vougy
74313	74350	Vovray-en-Bornes
74314	74520	Vulbens
74315	74140	Yvoire
