= Le Biot =

- Commune
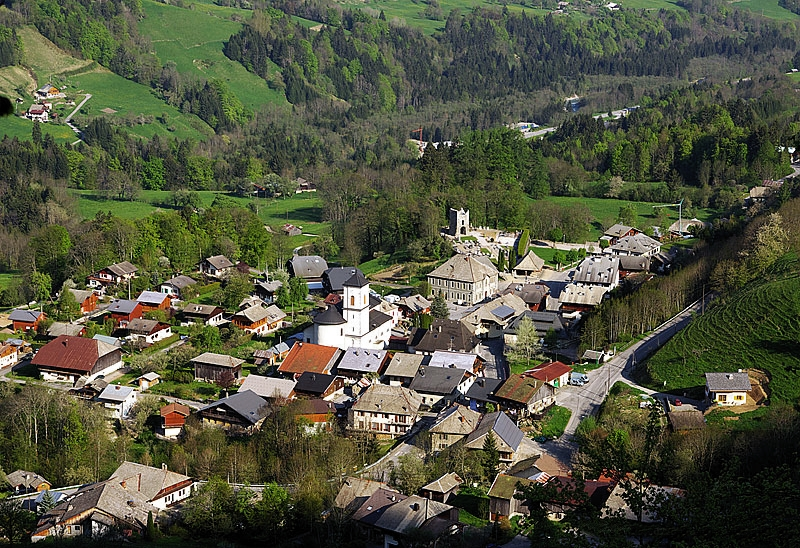
- Le Biot seen from above

- Coat of arms
- Location of Le Biot
- Location within France Location within Auvergne-Rhône-Alpes
- Coordinates: 46°15′48″N 6°37′59″E
- Country: France
- Region: Auvergne-Rhône-Alpes
- Department: Haute-Savoie
- Arrondissement: Thonon-les-Bains
- Canton: Évian-les-Bains
- Intercommunality: Haut-Chablais

Government
  - Mayor (2020–2026): Henri-Victor Tournier
- Area^{1}: 13.18 km^{2} (5.09 sq mi)
- Highest elevation: 1,870 m (6,140 ft)
- Lowest elevation: 660 m (2,170 ft)
- Population (2023): 633
  - Density: 48.0/km^{2} (124/sq mi)
- Time zone: UTC+01:00 (CET)
  - Summer (DST): UTC+02:00 (CEST)
- INSEE/Postal code: 74034 /74430
- ^{1} French Land Register data, which excludes lakes, ponds, glaciers > 1 km^{2} (0.386 sq mi or 247 acres) and river estuaries.

Le Biot (French pronunciation: [lə bjo]; Arpitan: Le Biôl) is a commune in the Haute-Savoie department in the Auvergne-Rhône-Alpes region in south-eastern France.

== See also ==
- Communes of the Haute-Savoie department
