= La Côte-d'Arbroz =

La Côte-d'Arbroz La Kouta-d’Abro (Savoyard)
- Commune
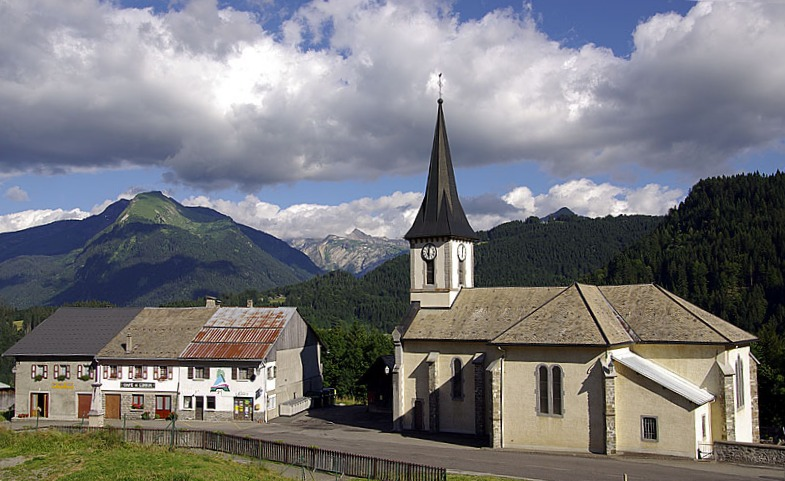
- La Côte-d'Arbroz: the church and nearby buildings

- Coat of arms
- Location of La Côte-d'Arbroz
- Location within France Location within Auvergne-Rhône-Alpes
- Coordinates: 46°11′19″N 6°40′08″E
- Country: France
- Region: Auvergne-Rhône-Alpes
- Department: Haute-Savoie
- Arrondissement: Thonon-les-Bains
- Canton: Évian-les-Bains
- Intercommunality: Haut-Chablais

Government
  - Mayor (2020–2026): Sophie Muffat
- Area^{1}: 12.24 km^{2} (4.73 sq mi)
- Highest elevation: 2,240 m (7,350 ft)
- Lowest elevation: 932 m (3,058 ft)
- Population (2023): 349
  - Density: 28.5/km^{2} (73.8/sq mi)
- Time zone: UTC+01:00 (CET)
  - Summer (DST): UTC+02:00 (CEST)
- INSEE/Postal code: 74091 /74110
- ^{1} French Land Register data, which excludes lakes, ponds, glaciers > 1 km^{2} (0.386 sq mi or 247 acres) and river estuaries.

La Côte-d'Arbroz (French pronunciation: [la kot daʁbʁo]; Savoyard: La Kouta-d’Abro) is a commune in the Haute-Savoie department and Auvergne-Rhône-Alpes region of eastern France.

== See also ==
- Communes of the Haute-Savoie department
