= Thollon-les-Mémises =

- Commune
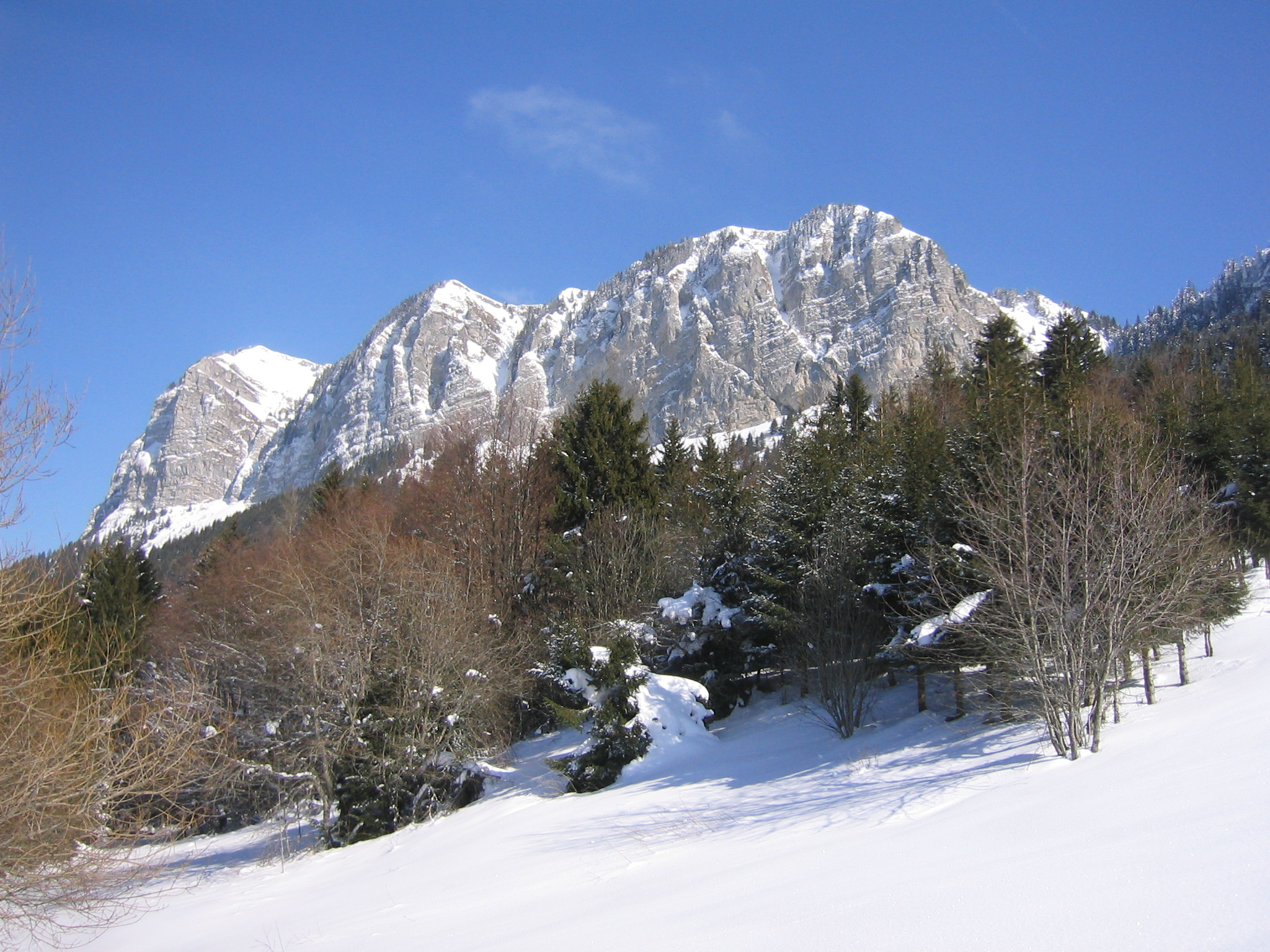
- A view of the mountain of Mémises

- Coat of arms
- Location of Thollon-les-Mémises
- Location within France Location within Auvergne-Rhône-Alpes
- Coordinates: 46°23′20″N 6°41′59″E
- Country: France
- Region: Auvergne-Rhône-Alpes
- Department: Haute-Savoie
- Arrondissement: Thonon-les-Bains
- Canton: Évian-les-Bains
- Intercommunality: Pays d'Évian Vallée d'Abondance

Government
  - Mayor (2020–2026): Régis Bened
- Area^{1}: 13.78 km^{2} (5.32 sq mi)
- Highest elevation: 1,975 m (6,480 ft)
- Lowest elevation: 760 m (2,490 ft)
- Population (2023): 879
  - Density: 63.8/km^{2} (165/sq mi)
- Time zone: UTC+01:00 (CET)
  - Summer (DST): UTC+02:00 (CEST)
- INSEE/Postal code: 74279 /74500
- ^{1} French Land Register data, which excludes lakes, ponds, glaciers > 1 km^{2} (0.386 sq mi or 247 acres) and river estuaries.

Thollon-les-Mémises (French pronunciation: [tɔlɔ̃ le memiz]; Arpitan: Tolon, before 1995: Thollon) is a commune in the Haute-Savoie department in the Auvergne-Rhône-Alpes region in south-eastern France.

It has its own ski resort with direct access to 50 km of downhill skiing, with 14 individual pistes, served by 18 ski lifts.

== See also ==
- Communes of the Haute-Savoie department
