= Bogève =

Bogève Bogéva (Arpitan)
- Commune
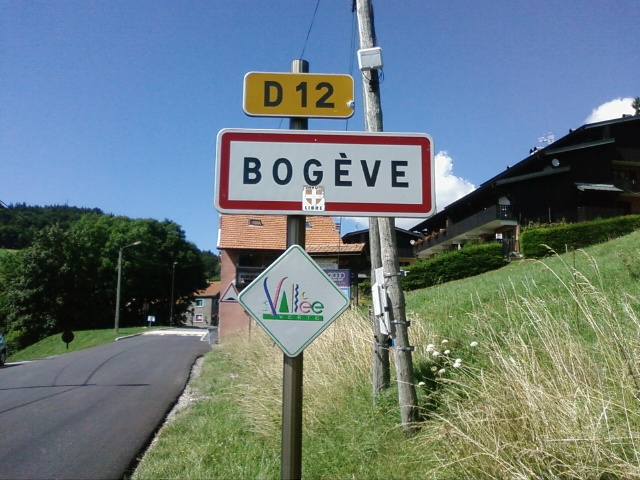
- The road into Bogève
- Location of Bogève
- Location within France Location within Auvergne-Rhône-Alpes
- Coordinates: 46°11′36″N 6°25′49″E
- Country: France
- Region: Auvergne-Rhône-Alpes
- Department: Haute-Savoie
- Arrondissement: Thonon-les-Bains
- Canton: Sciez
- Intercommunality: CC Vallée Verte

Government
  - Mayor (2020–2026): Patrick Chardon
- Area^{1}: 7 km^{2} (2.7 sq mi)
- Highest elevation: 1,313 m (4,308 ft)
- Lowest elevation: 833 m (2,733 ft)
- Population (2023): 1,200
  - Density: 170/km^{2} (440/sq mi)
- Time zone: UTC+01:00 (CET)
  - Summer (DST): UTC+02:00 (CEST)
- INSEE/Postal code: 74038 /74250
- ^{1} French Land Register data, which excludes lakes, ponds, glaciers > 1 km^{2} (0.386 sq mi or 247 acres) and river estuaries.

Bogève (French pronunciation: [bɔʒɛv]; Arpitan: Bogéva) is a commune in the Haute-Savoie department in the Auvergne-Rhône-Alpes region in south-eastern France.

== See also ==
- Communes of the Haute-Savoie department
