= Maxilly-sur-Léman =

- Commune
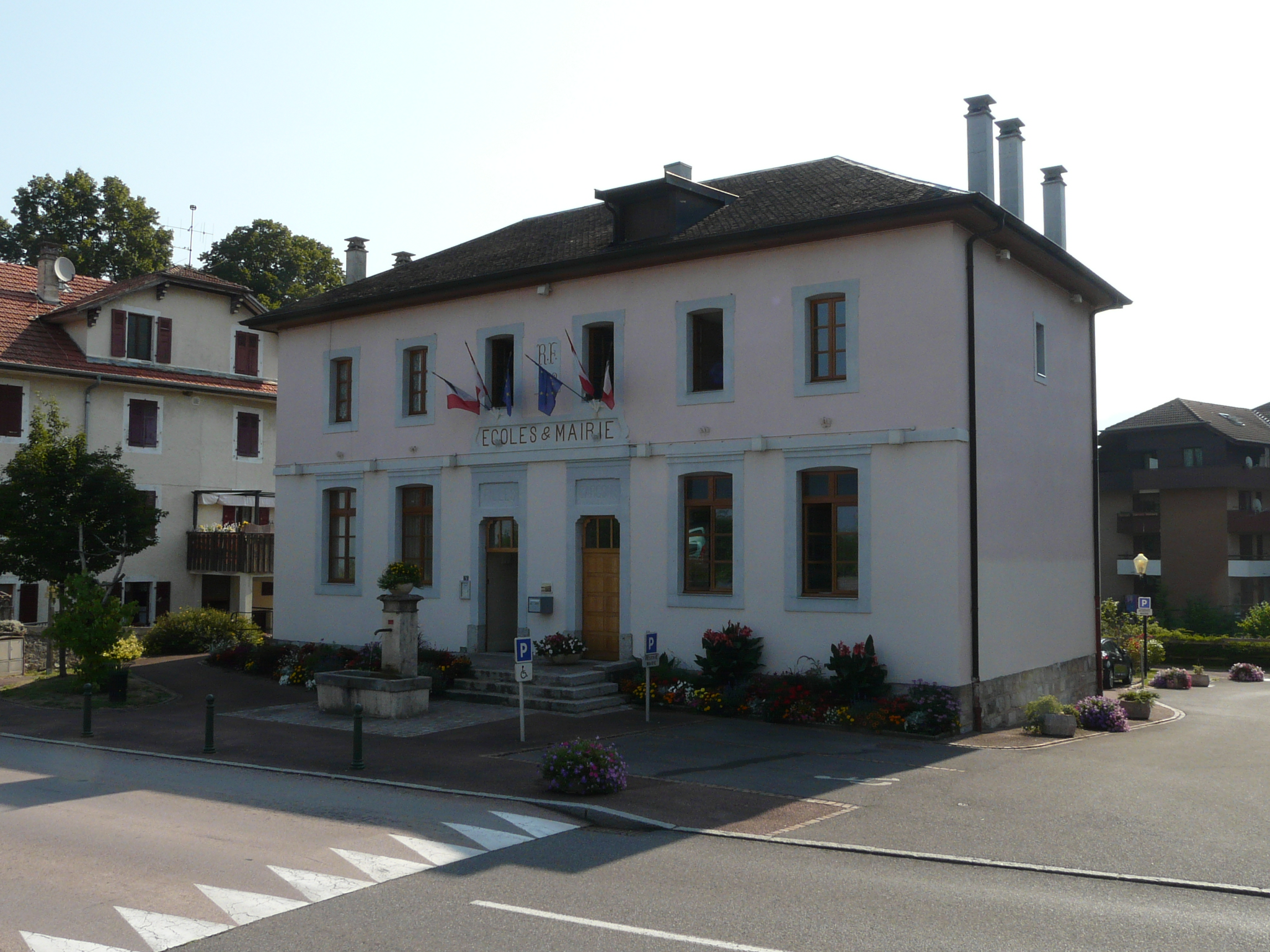
- Town hall

- Coat of arms
- Location of Maxilly-sur-Léman
- Location within France Location within Auvergne-Rhône-Alpes
- Coordinates: 46°24′N 6°39′E
- Country: France
- Region: Auvergne-Rhône-Alpes
- Department: Haute-Savoie
- Arrondissement: Thonon-les-Bains
- Canton: Évian-les-Bains
- Intercommunality: Pays d'Évian Vallée d'Abondance

Government
  - Mayor (2020–2026): Daniel Magnin
- Area^{1}: 4.03 km^{2} (1.56 sq mi)
- Highest elevation: 800 m (2,600 ft)
- Population (2023): 1,528
  - Density: 379/km^{2} (982/sq mi)
- Demonym: Maxilliens / Maxilliennes
- Time zone: UTC+01:00 (CET)
  - Summer (DST): UTC+02:00 (CEST)
- INSEE/Postal code: 74172 /74500
- Website: www.maxilly-sur-leman.fr
- ^{1} French Land Register data, which excludes lakes, ponds, glaciers > 1 km^{2} (0.386 sq mi or 247 acres) and river estuaries.

Maxilly-sur-Léman is a commune in the Haute-Savoie department in the Auvergne-Rhône-Alpes region in south-eastern France.

== See also ==
- Communes of the Haute-Savoie department
