= La Forclaz =

- Commune
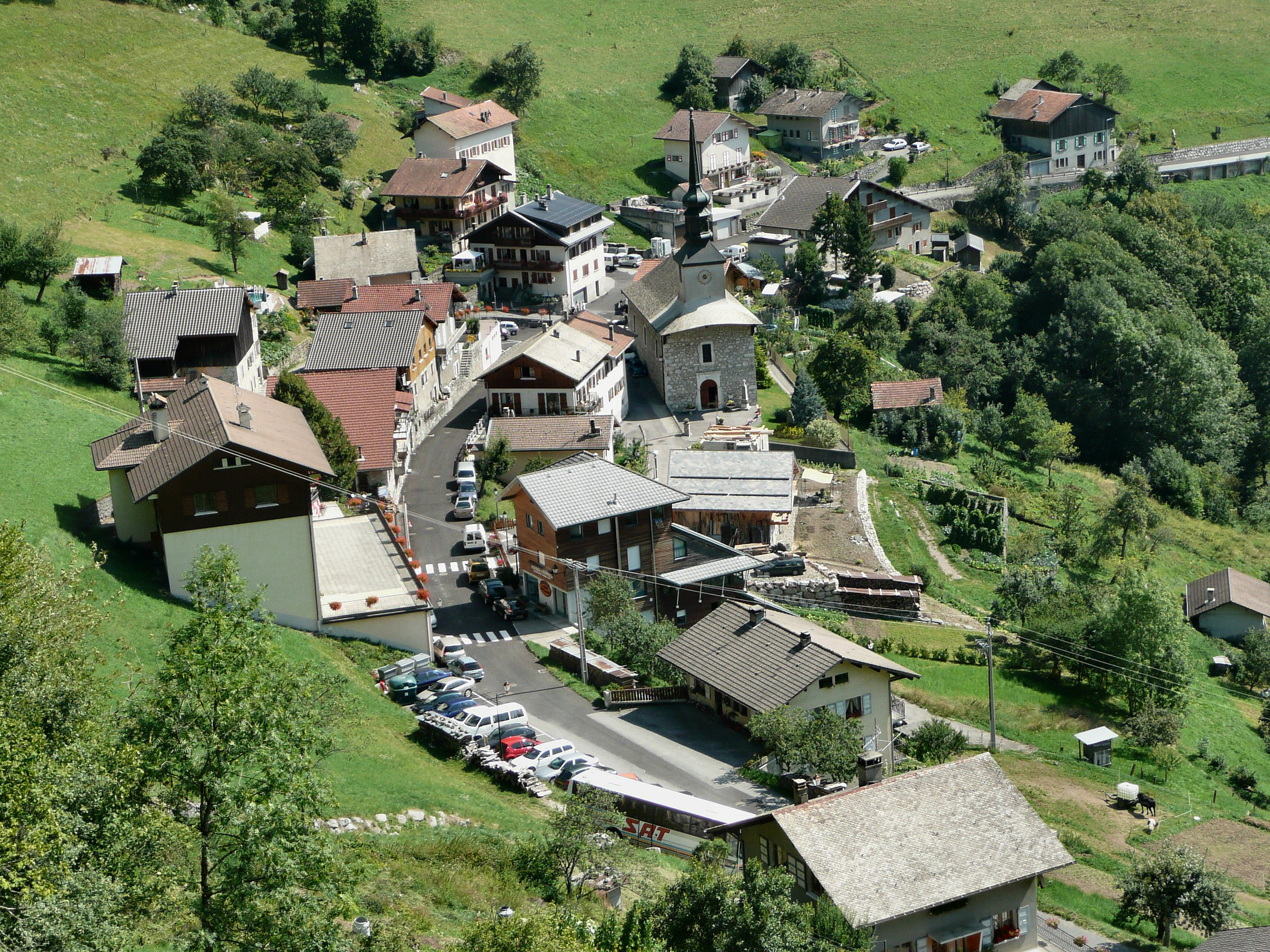
- A view of the village of La Forclaz
- Location of La Forclaz
- Location within France Location within Auvergne-Rhône-Alpes
- Coordinates: 46°19′21″N 6°36′52″E
- Country: France
- Region: Auvergne-Rhône-Alpes
- Department: Haute-Savoie
- Arrondissement: Thonon-les-Bains
- Canton: Évian-les-Bains
- Intercommunality: Haut-Chablais

Government
  - Mayor (2020–2026): Maryse Grenat
- Area^{1}: 4.04 km^{2} (1.56 sq mi)
- Highest elevation: 1,580 m (5,180 ft)
- Lowest elevation: 539 m (1,768 ft)
- Population (2023): 219
  - Density: 54.2/km^{2} (140/sq mi)
- Time zone: UTC+01:00 (CET)
  - Summer (DST): UTC+02:00 (CEST)
- INSEE/Postal code: 74129 /74200
- Website: www.laforclaz74.fr
- ^{1} French Land Register data, which excludes lakes, ponds, glaciers > 1 km^{2} (0.386 sq mi or 247 acres) and river estuaries.

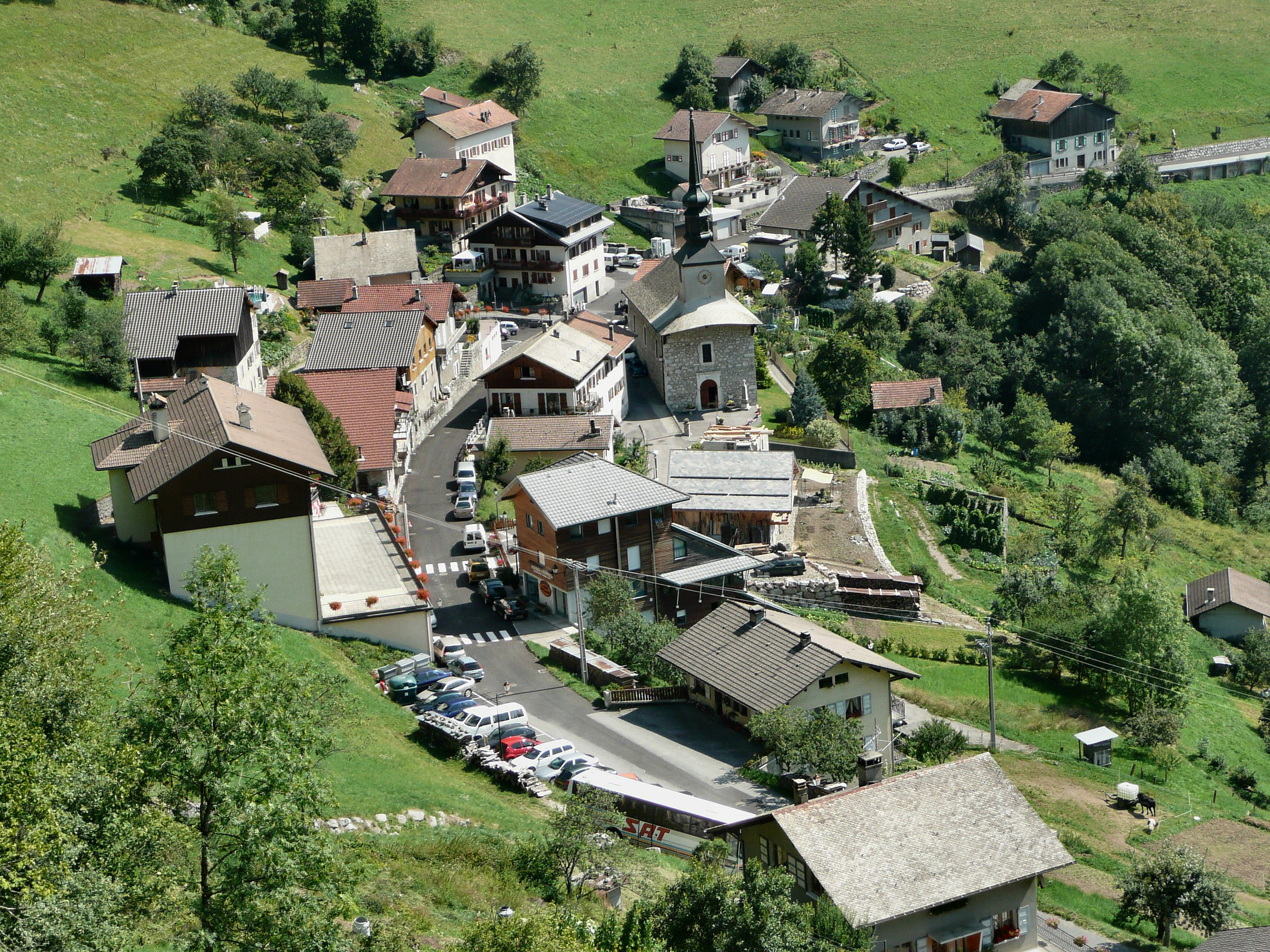
La Forclaz

La Forclaz (French pronunciation: [la fɔʁkla]; Arpitan: La Forclla) is a commune in the Haute-Savoie department in the Auvergne-Rhône-Alpes region in south-eastern France.

== See also ==
- Communes of the Haute-Savoie department
