= Montriond =

Commune of France

- Commune
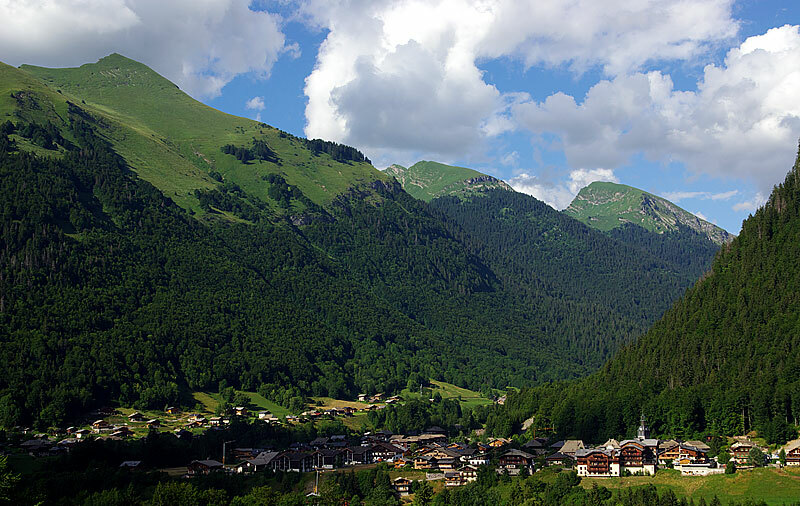
- Montriond village

- Coat of arms
- Location of Montriond
- Location within France Location within Auvergne-Rhône-Alpes
- Coordinates: 46°11′53″N 6°41′42″E
- Country: France
- Region: Auvergne-Rhône-Alpes
- Department: Haute-Savoie
- Arrondissement: Thonon-les-Bains
- Canton: Évian-les-Bains
- Intercommunality: Haut-Chablais

Government
  - Mayor (2020–2026): Jean-Claude Denne
- Area^{1}: 24.71 km^{2} (9.54 sq mi)
- Highest elevation: 2,340 m (7,680 ft)
- Lowest elevation: 877 m (2,877 ft)
- Population (2023): 969
  - Density: 39.2/km^{2} (102/sq mi)
- Time zone: UTC+01:00 (CET)
  - Summer (DST): UTC+02:00 (CEST)
- INSEE/Postal code: 74188 /74110
- ^{1} French Land Register data, which excludes lakes, ponds, glaciers > 1 km^{2} (0.386 sq mi or 247 acres) and river estuaries.

Montriond (French pronunciation: [mɔ̃tʁijɔ̃]; Arpitan: Meûryan) is a commune in the Haute-Savoie department in the Auvergne-Rhône-Alpes region in south-eastern France.

== History ==
In 1534, the hamlet of Montriond obtained permission to build a chapel. After the creation of the parish in 1717 "for the benefit of the commoners of the two hamlets of Ellex, Mont Riond and the Chairavaux valley," Montriond formed an independent community from Saint-Jean-d'Aulps in 1741. The municipality obtained its own school in 1775.

== Geography ==
Montriond is just north of the ski resorts of Morzine and Avoriaz in the Portes du Soleil ski resorts area, on the western side of Lac de Montriond, a small lake.

== Landmarks ==
Montriond's village centre features a small supermarket, ski/outdoors retailer and several restaurants as well as a tourist information office and a town hall.

== See also ==
- Communes of the Haute-Savoie department
