= Cervens =

Cervens Farvin (Savoyard)
- Commune
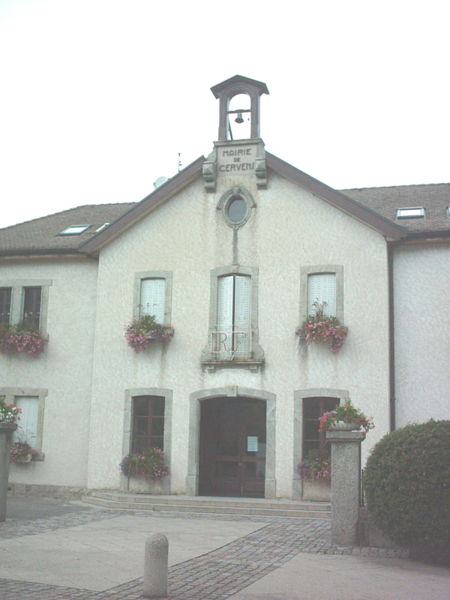
- Town hall

- Coat of arms
- Location of Cervens
- Location within France Location within Auvergne-Rhône-Alpes
- Coordinates: 46°17′12″N 6°26′32″E
- Country: France
- Region: Auvergne-Rhône-Alpes
- Department: Haute-Savoie
- Arrondissement: Thonon-les-Bains
- Canton: Thonon-les-Bains
- Intercommunality: Thonon Agglomération

Government
  - Mayor (2020–2026): Gil Thomas
- Area^{1}: 6.36 km^{2} (2.46 sq mi)
- Highest elevation: 1,230 m (4,040 ft)
- Lowest elevation: 565 m (1,854 ft)
- Population (2023): 1,270
  - Density: 200/km^{2} (517/sq mi)
- Time zone: UTC+01:00 (CET)
  - Summer (DST): UTC+02:00 (CEST)
- INSEE/Postal code: 74053 /74550
- ^{1} French Land Register data, which excludes lakes, ponds, glaciers > 1 km^{2} (0.386 sq mi or 247 acres) and river estuaries.

Cervens (Savoyard: Farvin) is a commune in the Haute-Savoie department in the Auvergne-Rhône-Alpes region in south-eastern France.

== See also ==
- Communes of the Haute-Savoie department
