= Habère-Poche =

- Commune
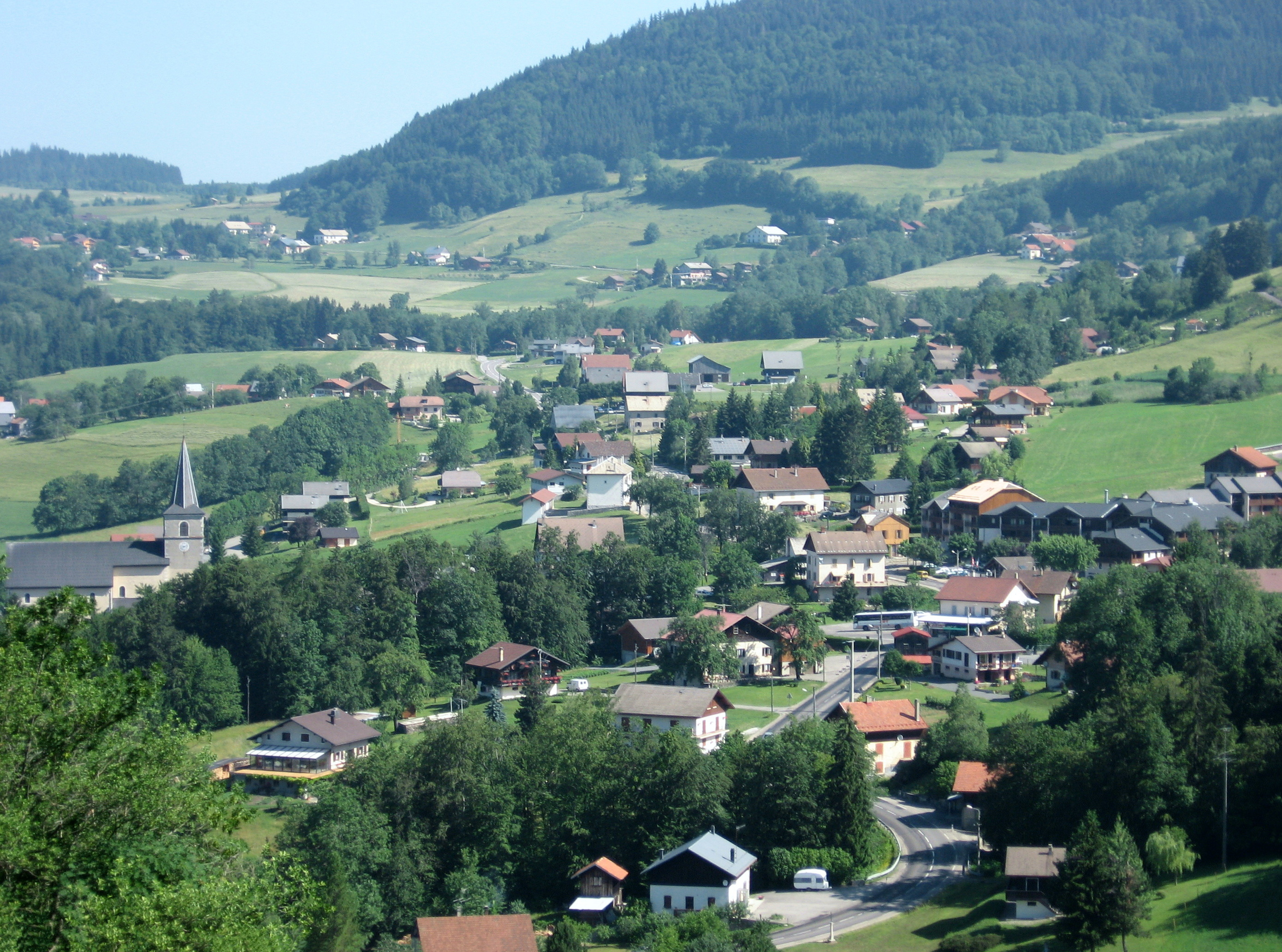
- A view of Habère-Poche

- Coat of arms
- Location of Habère-Poche
- Location within France Location within Auvergne-Rhône-Alpes
- Coordinates: 46°14′59″N 6°28′24″E
- Country: France
- Region: Auvergne-Rhône-Alpes
- Department: Haute-Savoie
- Arrondissement: Thonon-les-Bains
- Canton: Sciez
- Intercommunality: Vallée Verte

Government
  - Mayor (2020–2026): Vincent Letondal
- Area^{1}: 11.96 km^{2} (4.62 sq mi)
- Highest elevation: 1,560 m (5,120 ft)
- Lowest elevation: 850 m (2,790 ft)
- Population (2023): 1,488
  - Density: 124.4/km^{2} (322.2/sq mi)
- Demonym: Dhabérants
- Time zone: UTC+01:00 (CET)
  - Summer (DST): UTC+02:00 (CEST)
- INSEE/Postal code: 74140 /74420
- Website: habere-poche.fr
- ^{1} French Land Register data, which excludes lakes, ponds, glaciers > 1 km^{2} (0.386 sq mi or 247 acres) and river estuaries.

Habère-Poche (French pronunciation: [abɛʁ pɔʃ]; Arpitan: Âbèro d’Amont) is a commune in the Haute-Savoie department in the Auvergne-Rhône-Alpes region in south-eastern France.

== Population ==
Historical population
Year	Pop.	±% p.a.
1968	452	—
1975	464	+0.38%
1982	511	+1.39%
1990	662	+3.29%
1999	729	+1.08%
2007	1,193	+6.35%
2012	1,294	+1.64%
2017	1,465	+2.51%
2023	1,488	+0.26%
Source: INSEE

== See also ==
- Communes of the Haute-Savoie department
