= Vinzier =

- Commune
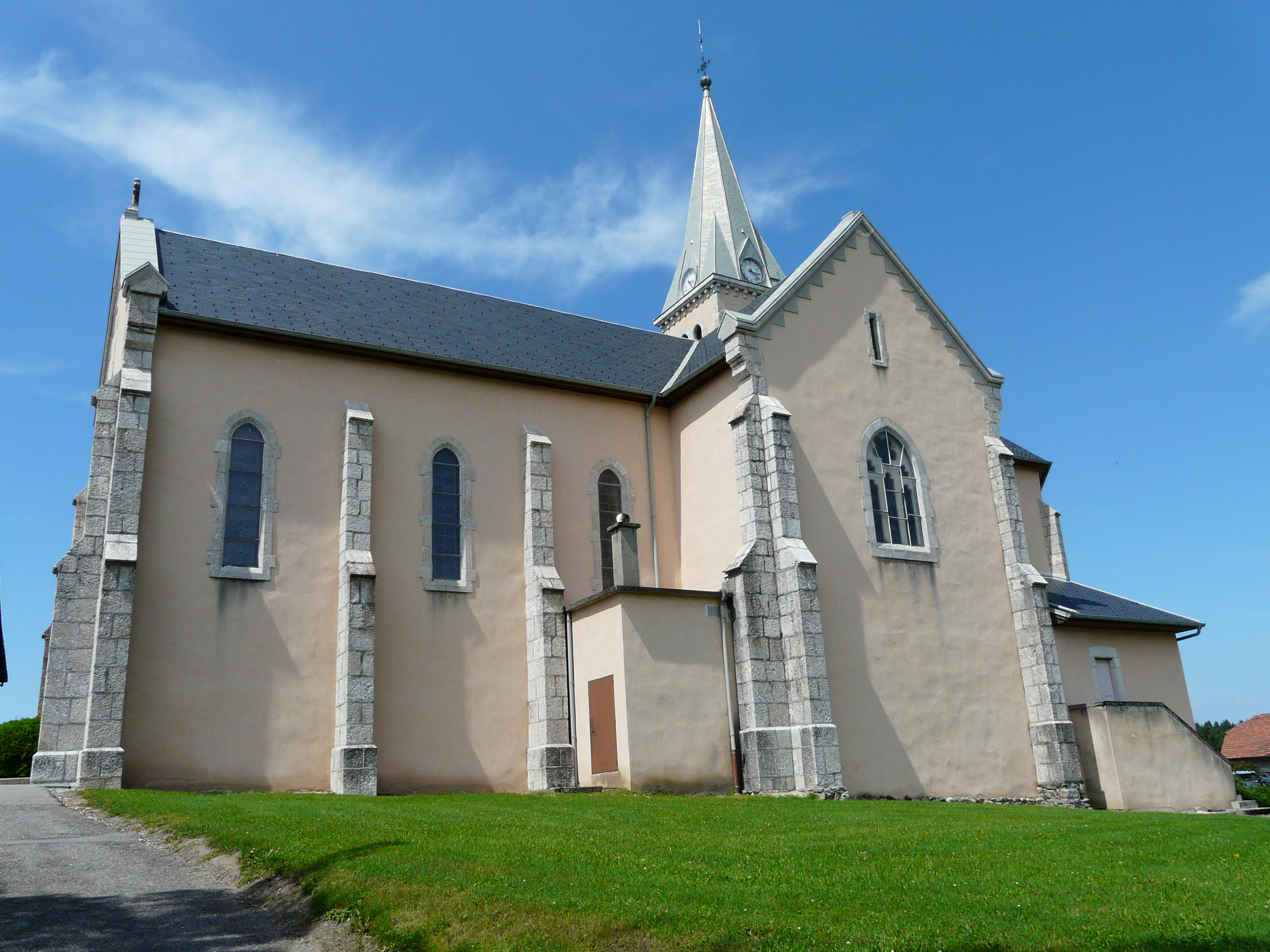
- The church in Vinzier

- Coat of arms
- Location of Vinzier
- Location within France Location within Auvergne-Rhône-Alpes
- Coordinates: 46°21′00″N 6°37′09″E
- Country: France
- Region: Auvergne-Rhône-Alpes
- Department: Haute-Savoie
- Arrondissement: Thonon-les-Bains
- Canton: Évian-les-Bains
- Intercommunality: Pays d'Évian Vallée d'Abondance

Government
  - Mayor (2020–2026): Marie-Pierre Girard
- Area^{1}: 7 km^{2} (2.7 sq mi)
- Highest elevation: 920 m (3,020 ft)
- Lowest elevation: 536 m (1,759 ft)
- Population (2023): 896
  - Density: 130/km^{2} (330/sq mi)
- Demonym: Vinzolais
- Time zone: UTC+01:00 (CET)
  - Summer (DST): UTC+02:00 (CEST)
- INSEE/Postal code: 74308 /74500
- ^{1} French Land Register data, which excludes lakes, ponds, glaciers > 1 km^{2} (0.386 sq mi or 247 acres) and river estuaries.

Vinzier is a commune in the Haute-Savoie department in the Auvergne-Rhône-Alpes region in south-eastern France.

== See also ==
- Communes of the Haute-Savoie department
