= La Vernaz =

La Vernaz La Vérna (Arpitan)
- Commune
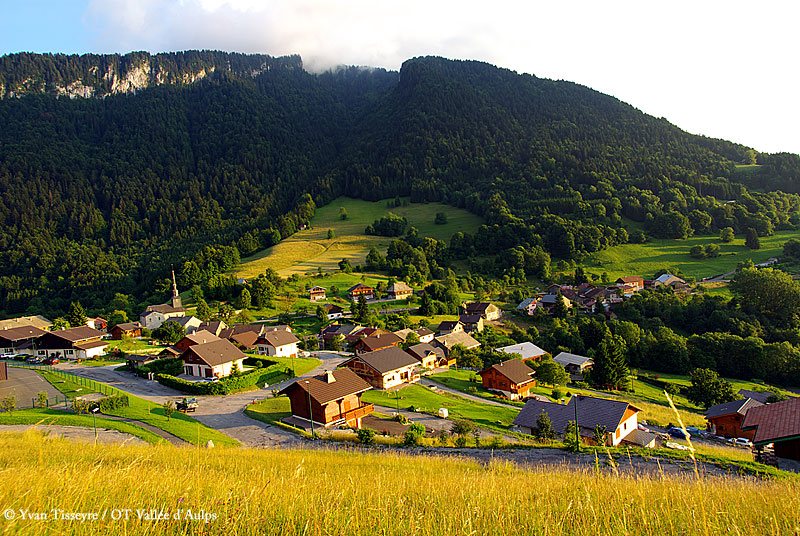
- A general view of La Vernaz
- Location of La Vernaz
- Location within France Location within Auvergne-Rhône-Alpes
- Coordinates: 46°18′57″N 6°35′38″E
- Country: France
- Region: Auvergne-Rhône-Alpes
- Department: Haute-Savoie
- Arrondissement: Thonon-les-Bains
- Canton: Évian-les-Bains
- Intercommunality: Haut-Chablais

Government
  - Mayor (2026–32): Karine Luchini
- Area^{1}: 7.78 km^{2} (3.00 sq mi)
- Elevation: 808 m (2,651 ft)
- Highest elevation: 1,890 m (6,200 ft)
- Lowest elevation: 520 m (1,710 ft)
- Population (2023): 280
  - Density: 36/km^{2} (93/sq mi)
- Time zone: UTC+01:00 (CET)
  - Summer (DST): UTC+02:00 (CEST)
- INSEE/Postal code: 74295 /74200
- ^{1} French Land Register data, which excludes lakes, ponds, glaciers > 1 km^{2} (0.386 sq mi or 247 acres) and river estuaries.

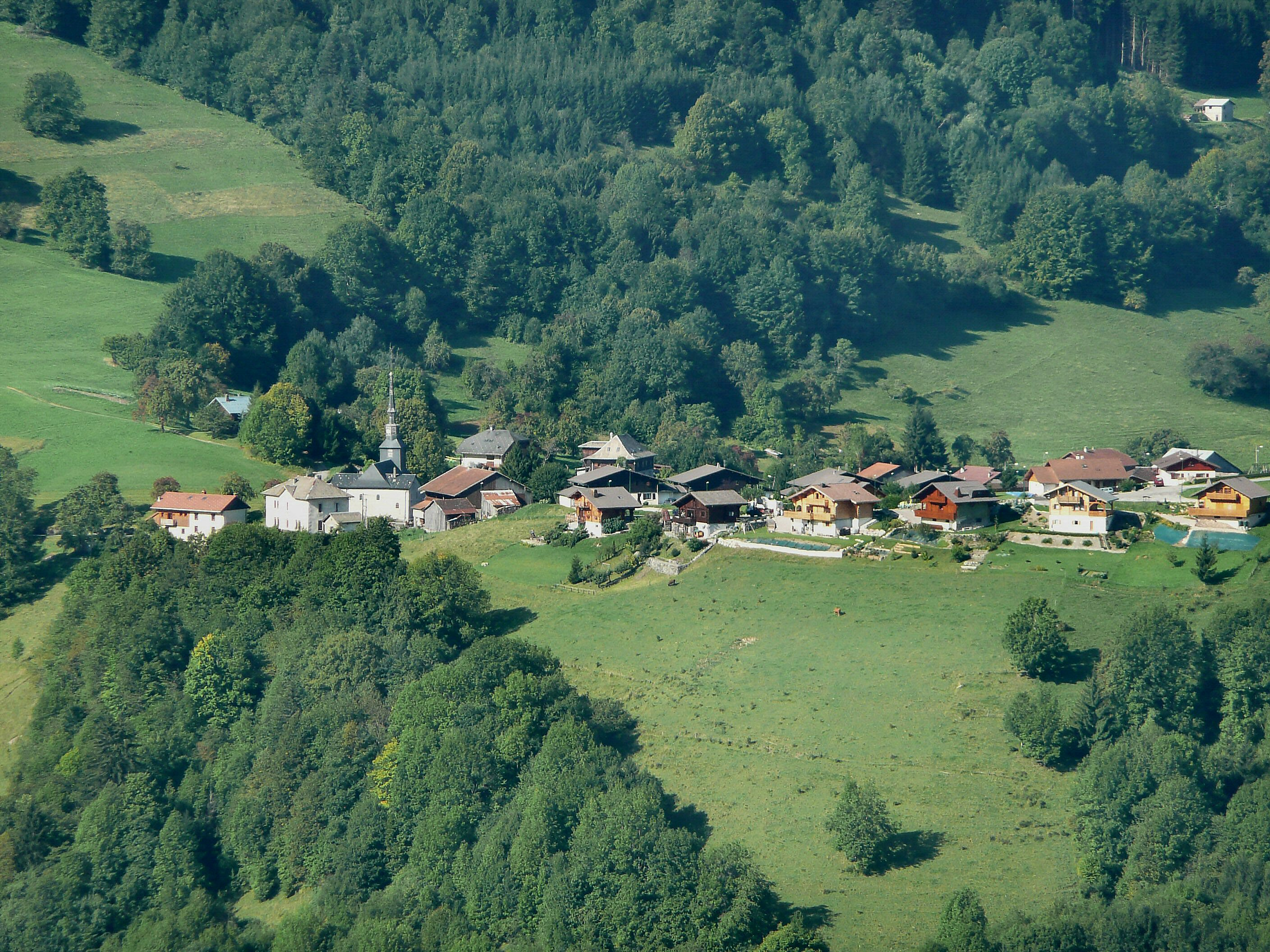
La Vernaz

La Vernaz (Arpitan: La Vérna) is a commune in the Haute-Savoie department in the Auvergne-Rhône-Alpes region in south-eastern France.

== See also ==
- Communes of the Haute-Savoie department
