= Larringes =

- Commune
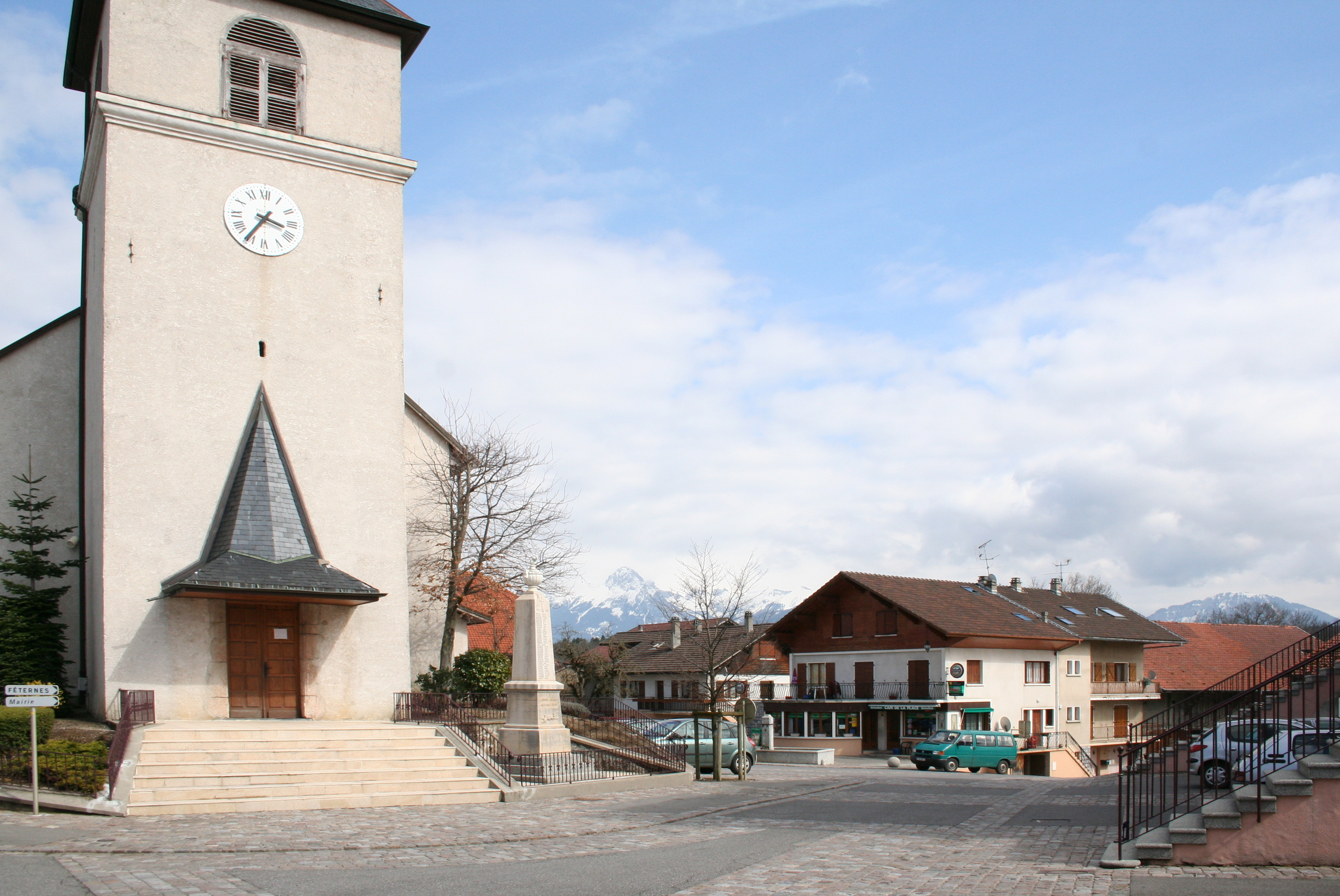
- The church in Larringes

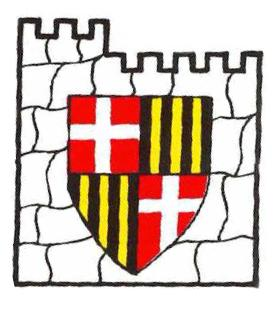
- Coat of arms
- Location of Larringes
- Location within France Location within Auvergne-Rhône-Alpes
- Coordinates: 46°22′00″N 6°35′00″E
- Country: France
- Region: Auvergne-Rhône-Alpes
- Department: Haute-Savoie
- Arrondissement: Thonon-les-Bains
- Canton: Évian-les-Bains
- Intercommunality: Pays d'Évian Vallée d'Abondance

Government
  - Mayor (2023–2026): Georges Blanc
- Area^{1}: 8.07 km^{2} (3.12 sq mi)
- Highest elevation: 873 m (2,864 ft)
- Lowest elevation: 713 m (2,339 ft)
- Population (2023): 1,592
  - Density: 197/km^{2} (511/sq mi)
- Demonym: Larringeois / Larringeoises
- Time zone: UTC+01:00 (CET)
  - Summer (DST): UTC+02:00 (CEST)
- INSEE/Postal code: 74146 /74500
- Website: Mairie-larringes.fr
- ^{1} French Land Register data, which excludes lakes, ponds, glaciers > 1 km^{2} (0.386 sq mi or 247 acres) and river estuaries.

Larringes (French pronunciation: [laʁɛ̃ʒ]) is a commune in the Haute-Savoie department in the Auvergne-Rhône-Alpes region in south-eastern France.

== See also ==
- Communes of the Haute-Savoie department
