= Canton of Évian-les-Bains =

Coordinates: 46.40°N 6.59°E

The canton of Évian-les-Bains is an administrative division of the Haute-Savoie department, southeastern France. Its borders were modified at the French canton reorganisation which came into effect in March 2015. Its seat is in Évian-les-Bains.

It consists of the following communes:

1. Abondance
2. La Baume
3. Bernex
4. Le Biot
5. Bonnevaux
6. Champanges
7. La Chapelle-d'Abondance
8. Châtel
9. Chevenoz
10. La Côte-d'Arbroz
11. Essert-Romand
12. Évian-les-Bains
13. Féternes
14. La Forclaz
15. Les Gets
16. Larringes
17. Lugrin
18. Marin
19. Maxilly-sur-Léman
20. Meillerie
21. Montriond
22. Morzine
23. Neuvecelle
24. Novel
25. Publier
26. Saint-Gingolph
27. Saint-Jean-d'Aulps
28. Saint-Paul-en-Chablais
29. Seytroux
30. Thollon-les-Mémises
31. Vacheresse
32. La Vernaz
33. Vinzier
