= Essert-Romand =

- Commune
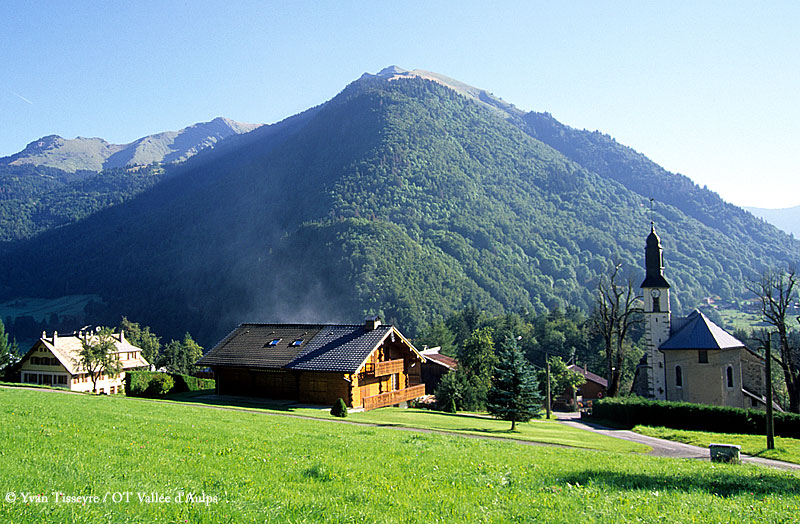
- The village of Essert-Romand

- Coat of arms
- Location of Essert-Romand
- Location within France Location within Auvergne-Rhône-Alpes
- Coordinates: 46°12′09″N 6°40′19″E
- Country: France
- Region: Auvergne-Rhône-Alpes
- Department: Haute-Savoie
- Arrondissement: Thonon-les-Bains
- Canton: Évian-les-Bains
- Intercommunality: Haut-Chablais

Government
  - Mayor (2020–2026): Jean-François Muffat
- Area^{1}: 6.78 km^{2} (2.62 sq mi)
- Highest elevation: 1,780 m (5,840 ft)
- Lowest elevation: 837 m (2,746 ft)
- Population (2023): 526
  - Density: 77.6/km^{2} (201/sq mi)
- Time zone: UTC+01:00 (CET)
  - Summer (DST): UTC+02:00 (CEST)
- INSEE/Postal code: 74114 /74110
- Website: Essert-romand.fr
- ^{1} French Land Register data, which excludes lakes, ponds, glaciers > 1 km^{2} (0.386 sq mi or 247 acres) and river estuaries.

Essert-Romand (French pronunciation: [esɛʁ ʁɔmɑ̃]; Arpitan: Éssarman) is a commune in the Haute-Savoie department in the Auvergne-Rhône-Alpes region in south-eastern France. Bordering the winter skiing resort town of Morzine, Essert-Romand is a popular location for holiday homes and ski chalets which are largely unused outside the winter season. There is a small active farming community, farming mainly sheep and goats.

Essert-Romand is found at an altitude of 938m.

== See also ==
- Communes of the Haute-Savoie department
