= Château de Ballaison =

French fortified castle

Ballaison Castle, Balleyson
- Interactive map of Ballaison Castle, Balleyson
- Location: Ballaison; Haute-Savoie; Auvergne-Rhône-Alpes; France
- Type: Castle
- Beginning date: 11th century
- Dedicated date: Count's residence
- Former provinces of the Duchy of Savoy: Genevois

The Château de Ballaison, also known as Balleyson (castrum Baleysonis/Balleysinis), was a fortified castle built in the 11th century and served as the center of the seigneury of Ballaison. It stood in the commune of Ballaison in the Haute-Savoie department, within the Auvergne-Rhône-Alpes region. A major fief during the feudal period of the Counts of Geneva, it successively passed to the House of Savoy and the House of Geneva before being destroyed in 1591. The Château de Thénières was later constructed on its site by Ernest de Boigne in 1863.

== Location ==
The Château de Ballaison, now destroyed, stood in the commune of Ballaison in the Haute-Savoie department. It was located on the northwestern edge of the Château de Boisy, on a hill above the Vions torrent. The site overlooked the surrounding area above Douvaine, northeast of Geneva, near the road along Lake Geneva toward the Chablais.

== History ==
In the 13th century, the site contained a settlement, later known as the Bourg Vieux, and two castles: one held by the Count of Geneva and serving as the seat of a châtellenie, and the other held by the Lord of Ballaison. For the castle of Ballaison or Balleyson, the counts were required to render homage to the prince-bishops of Geneva.

According to the historian Léon Menabrea, control of the Château de Ballaison by the Counts of Geneva contributed to prolonged conflicts between them and the House of Savoy during the 13th and 14th centuries.

=== Center of a châtellenie ===
The earliest known reference to a Lord of Ballaison, identified as Pierre, dates to 1138 in connection with the foundation of the Charterhouse of Vallon.

The fief of Ballaison subsequently came under the authority of the Counts of Geneva through circumstances that remain unclear. They appointed a châtelain to administer the territory, with the castle serving as its administrative center. The seigneury of Ballaison, where the Ballaison family resided, exercised authority over nine parishes.

=== Pledged domain ===
In 1250, (Note: The castle was pledged to the Count of Savoy in 1272 according to Christian Regat.) during a dispute between Pierre, brother of the Count of Savoy, and Count William II of Geneva, the castle (Note: A pledge (gagerie) was a process by which a lord placed his fief as security for a large sum of money. The property immediately came into the possession of the lender. If the lord repaid the loan, he recovered his property; otherwise, it passed permanently into the hands of the other lord.) was pledged to the Humbertiens. Pierre of Savoy appointed Emeric d’Aigueblanche as châtelain.

In 1287, the castle returned to the Counts of Geneva under the Treaty of Annemasse. On this occasion, the Count of Geneva paid homage to the Count of Savoy for the Château de Ballaison and for that of Geneva, with the consent of the bishop of Geneva.

On 29 April 1305, Count Amadeus II of Geneva rendered liege homage to the Bishop of Geneva, Aymon de Quart, for various rights that included the castle. His son, William III of Geneva, renewed this homage in 1313.

At the end of the 14th century, the seigneury of Ballaison was subdivided with the creation of the seigneury of Bourg Neuf at the foot of the hill, in the area now belonging to Douvaine. This new fief was granted to the Miolans.

=== Loss of strategic importance and disappearance ===
In 1401, when the County of Geneva became a possession of the House of Savoy under Amadeus VIII, the comital castle lost its strategic function and was administratively attached to the Chablais. In 1475, Duchess Yolande granted it to Anthelme de Miolans, later Marshal of Savoy, and to his wife, Gilberte de Polignac.

On 21 May 1529, the barony and the castle were sold by Claude or Claudine de Miolans to Claude de Ballaison (Balleyson), (Note: Claude de Ballaison served as ambassador of Duke Philibert the Handsome of Savoy and negotiated his marriage to Margaret of Austria in 1501.) who thereby became the owner of both castles. A member of the Ballaison family, he briefly reunited the estates, but upon his death in 1541, his holdings were divided among several families, including Cholex, Allinges-Coudrée, Foras, Sales, Neuchâtel, and Mionnas.

In the 16th century, after the city of Geneva adopted Protestantism, it perceived a threat from the Counts of Savoy. Bern intervened in support of Geneva, and this area, like the neighboring Chablais, was occupied between 1536 and 1557. In 1591, the Bourg Vieux and its two castles were captured and destroyed by Genevan forces. The regional administrative role subsequently shifted to Douvaine, leading to the decline of Ballaison.

The ruins of the castle passed through several families in the 17th century, including the Allinges-Coudrée, Montgenis, and Livet de Thoire families. In 1811, Jean Lasserre, a resident of Geneva, acquired the site and soon sold it to General de Boigne. In 1864, Ernest de Boigne constructed the Château de Thénières on the site of the former fortress.

== Description ==
Nothing remains of the two medieval castles, although their substantial ruins were still visible in 1848.

== The châtellenie of Ballaison ==
The Château de Ballaison served as the seat of a châtellenie, also known as a mandement (mandamentum). It was administratively linked to Beauregard, except toward the end of the 14th century, and functioned as a comital châtellenie directly under the Count of Geneva. In the County of Geneva, the comital châtelain was appointed by the count and held broad administrative and fiscal authority. After the territory was incorporated into the County of Savoy in 1401, the châtelain became an officer appointed for a fixed term and could be revoked or removed. The châtelain was responsible for managing the châtellenie, collecting revenues, and maintaining the castle. He was sometimes assisted by an accounts receiver, who prepared the annual financial report for submission.

The châtellenie of Ballaison encompassed the parishes of Ballaison, Bons, Brens, Chens, Douvaine, Loisin, Saint-Didier, Massongy, and Veigy.

Villages, parishes, fortifications of the castellany of Ballaison
Commune	Name	Type	Date (attestation)
Ballaison	Château de Ballaison	castle	1250 (attested)
Bons-en-Chablais	Tour de Langin	castle	1225 (attested)
Chens-sur-Léman	Château de Beauregard	fortified house	1250 (attested)
Douvaine	Château de Troche	castle	

The châtellenie was situated in the Lower Chablais, bordered to the west by the châtellenie of Hermance, under the Lords of Faucigny, and adjacent to the Chablais, which was part of the possessions of the House of Savoy.

Castellans of Ballaison (and of Beauregard and the House of Troches), 14th to 16th centuries
Genevan administration
- 1340–1343 (and Beauregard): Thibault de Châtillon
- 1371–1376: Pierre de la Balme, also castellan of Hermance (1369–1376)

Savoyard administration (also of Beauregard)

- 24 June 1411 – 4 June 1413 (also receiver): Henry de la Fléchère (Fléchière)
- 4 June 1413 – 8 January 1414, then until 8 January 1418: Guy de Rougemont
- 29 April 1418 – 21 January, then until 21 January 1421 (also receiver), and until 21 January 1423: Pierre Gaillard
- 21 January 1423 – 21 January 1424: Pierre Gaillard and Nicod de Coennoz (Cuoenoz) of Alby, co-castellans
- 21 January 1424 – 14 August 1427: Nicod de Coennoz (Cuoenoz) of Alby
- 14 August 1427 – 21 February 1429, then until 21 January 1430 (also receiver), and until 21 January 1436: Hugonin de Mecoras
- 7 August 1436 – 12 June 1445: Guillaume de la Fléchère (Fléchière)
- 12 June 1445 – 21 January 1446: Amed (Amé) Botollier
- 9 June 1446 – 17 March 1450: Henry de Govillionna(z)
- 17 March 1450 – 1 March 1451: Louis de Lucinge(s)
- 1 March 1451 – 1 March 1452 (also receiver), then until 1 March 1455: Pierre de Campremy
- 1 March 1455 – 28 September 1456: sons and heirs of Pierre de Campremy
- 28 September 1456 – 1 March 1457: Jean Marcel
- 1 March 1457 – 27 November 1458, then until 1 March 1459 (also receiver), and until 1 March 1460: Guillaume Toreau. Lieutenant: Guillaume du Châtelard (1460–1461)
- 1 March 1461 – 1 May 1461: Guillaume du Châtelard
- 1 May 1461 – 1 March 1462: Jean de Compois (Compey)
- 24 June 1462 – 1 March 1466: Jean Marcel
- 1 March 1466 – 1 March 1467, then until 1 March 1468 (also receiver), and until 1 March 1475: François (Jean) de Rovorée or Ravorée (sometimes written Ravoire), lord of Cursinges, also castellan of Hermance (1466–1475)
- 1606: François Quisard

== See also ==
- Medieval fortification

== Bibliography ==
- de la Corbière, Matthieu (2002). L'invention et la défense des frontières dans le diocèse de Genève : Étude des principautés et de l'habitat fortifié (XIIe - XIVe siècle) [The invention and defense of borders in the diocese of Geneva: A study of principalities and fortified settlements (12th–14th centuries)] (in French). Annecy: Académie salésienne. ISBN 978-2-901102-18-2.
- Baud, Henri; Mariotte, Jean-Yves (1980). Histoire des communes savoyardes : Le Chablais [History of Savoyard municipalities: Chablais] (in French). Roanne: Éditions Horvath. pp. 294–296. ISBN 978-2-7171-0099-0.
- Regat, Christian; Aubert, François (1999). Châteaux de Haute-Savoie : Chablais, Faucigny, Genevois [Castles of Haute-Savoie: Chablais, Faucigny, Genevois] (in French). Éditions Cabédita. pp. 32–33. ISBN 978-2-88295-117-5.
- Blondel, Louis (1978). Châteaux de l'ancien diocèse de Genève [Castles of the former diocese of Geneva] (in French). Vol. 7. Société d'histoire et d'archéologie de Genève. pp. 289–298.
- Payraud, Nicolas (2009). Châteaux, espace et société en Dauphiné et en Savoie du milieu du XIIIe siècle à la fin du XVe siècle [Castles, space, and society in Dauphiné and Savoie from the mid-13th century to the end of the 15th century] (Thesis) (in French). Université Lumière-Lyon-II.
