= Sciez =

- Commune
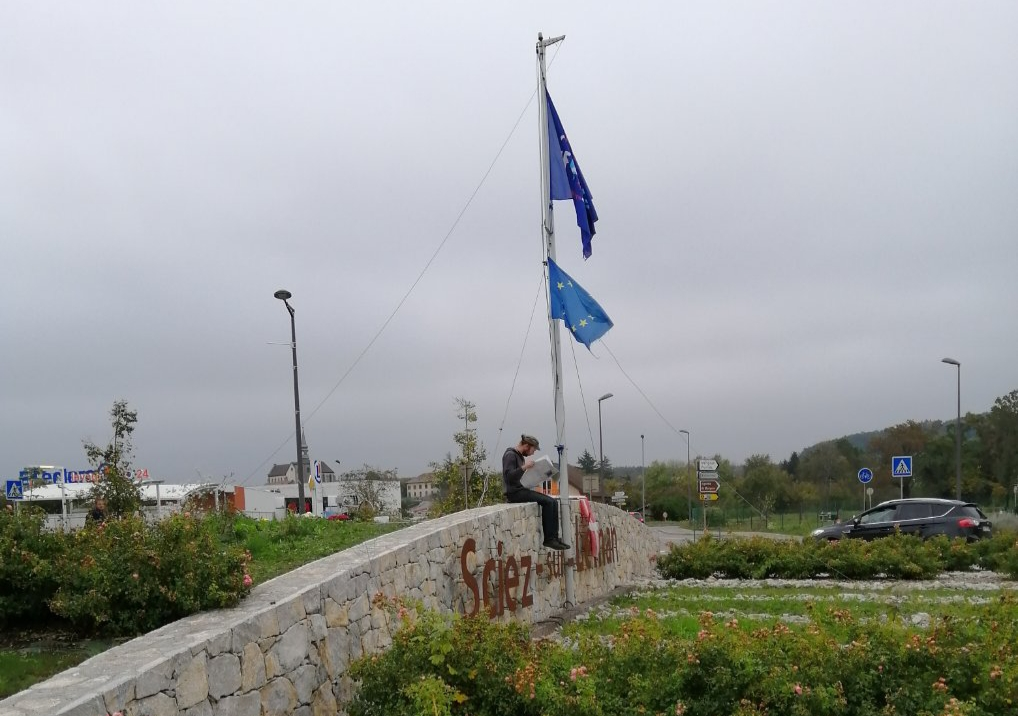

- Coat of arms
- Location of Sciez
- Location within France Location within Auvergne-Rhône-Alpes
- Coordinates: 46°19′59″N 6°22′29″E
- Country: France
- Region: Auvergne-Rhône-Alpes
- Department: Haute-Savoie
- Arrondissement: Thonon-les-Bains
- Canton: Sciez
- Intercommunality: Thonon Agglomération

Government
  - Mayor (2020–2026): Cyril Démolis
- Area^{1}: 20.47 km^{2} (7.90 sq mi)
- Highest elevation: 725 m (2,379 ft)
- Lowest elevation: 372 m (1,220 ft)
- Population (2023): 6,447
  - Density: 314.9/km^{2} (815.7/sq mi)
- Time zone: UTC+01:00 (CET)
  - Summer (DST): UTC+02:00 (CEST)
- INSEE/Postal code: 74263 /74140
- ^{1} French Land Register data, which excludes lakes, ponds, glaciers > 1 km^{2} (0.386 sq mi or 247 acres) and river estuaries.

Sciez (French pronunciation: [sje]; Arpitan: Siéz) is a commune in the Haute-Savoie department in the Auvergne-Rhône-Alpes region in south-eastern France. Sciez forms part of a transborder agglomeration known as Grand Genève (Greater Geneva).

== Geography ==
=== Situation ===
==== Localization ====
The commune is located on the border of the Apline chain and of the Lac Léman. The commune is in the département of Haute-Savoie in the region called Auvergne-Rhône-Alpes. Sciez is in the Chablais, between Evian and Geneva, near Douvaine, the medieval town of Yvoire and Thonon-les-bains. Sciez is also not far from the ski slopes Portes du Soleil (Avoriaz, Morzine, Chatel, Les Gets, Abondance) but also close from Chamonix and Mont Blanc.

==== Climate ====
The climate is influenced by the nearby mountains, but the lake creates a micro-climate, which allows Sciez to enjoy relatively mild winters with temperatures averaging 0 (minimum) to 5 (maximum) Celsius, in December–January. It occasionally snows in the winter, but not always by the lake. Snow is easily accessible in the nearby mountains. Summers are temperate with an average of 13 (minimum) to 25 (maximum) Celsius, in July–August, and certain inhabitants manage to grow palm trees in their gardens.

==== Communication channels and transports ====
Sciez is located on the old Route Nationale 5 (RN5), now Départementale 1005 (D1005). This road while crossing the commune changes name and is called: Avenue de Genève, Avenue de Sciez et Avenue de Bonnatrait. Sciez is near the small train station of Perrignier. Regular buses serve Sciez on the Genève-Douvaine-Thonon-Evian axis. Regular buses serve Genève, Thonon and Evian. Sciez harbour connects with a few other harbours around the Lac Léman with boats from the Compagnie Générale de Navigation sur le lac Léman.

=== Urbanism ===
==== Urban Morphology ====
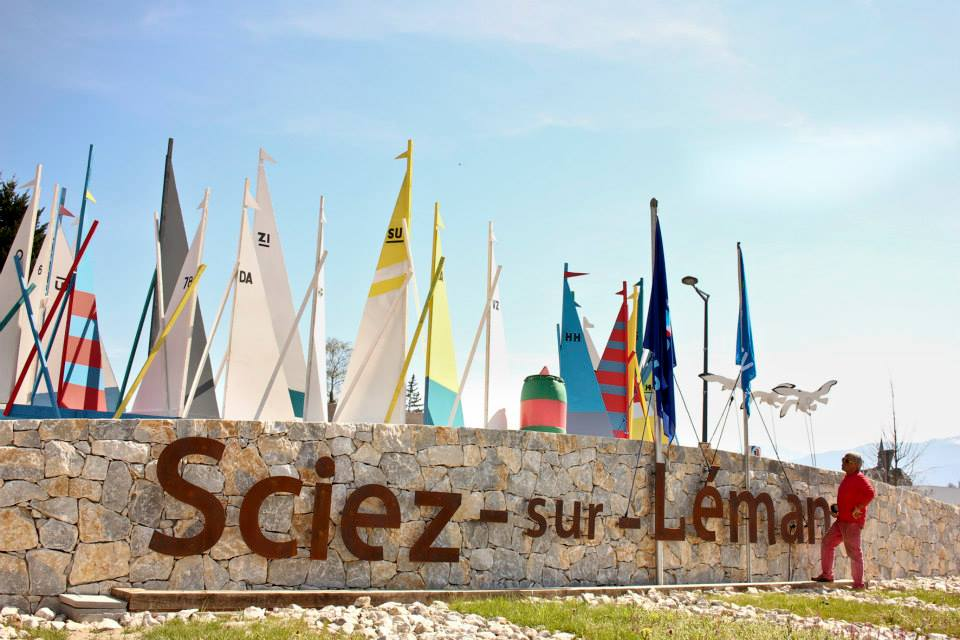

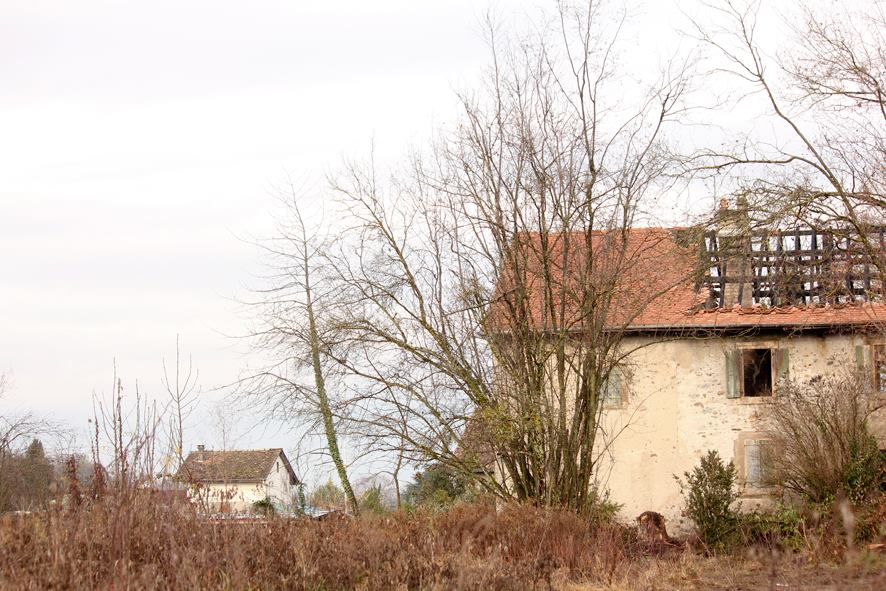
Historic Farm Castelli

The commune is composed of a main town and of several hamlets and localities which are :

- Bonnatrait
- Chavannex
- Filly
- La Fattaz (Arpitan language toponym meaning the pocket)
- Coudrée (Domaine de)
- Excuvilly
- Choisy
- Port de Sciez
- Songy
- La Renouillère
- Chef-Lieu
- Sur les Crêts
- Marignan (Morgnan, the Arpitan version can still be heard nowadays)
- Prailles
- Jussy
- Le Content
- Les Cinq-Chemins.

== Heraldic ==
- fr:Sciez#H.C3.A9raldique

== Administration ==
Period	Identity	Party	Capacity
October 1944 March 1971 || Alexandre Néplaz || PCF ||
March 1971 March 1983	Jean Dunand		
March 1983 February 1985	François Bally		
February 1985 March 1989	Jean Vannier		
March 1989 September 2003	Bernard Néplaz	PCF	Conseiller général du Canton de Thonon-les-Bains-Ouest (1998-2004)
September 2003 Ongoing	Jean-Luc Bidal	UMP	
All data not yet known

== History ==
Prehistory:

Late Neolithic : Around -2400, a branch of the Saône-Rhône civilization, from Western Switzerland (Cordée Civilization) slowly locates on the banks of the Léman lake (Excenevex, Chens, Sciez). They exported their productions (copper beads, axes-hammers) all the way to the South of Dauphine via Annecy, Fillinges, Haute-Savoie…

Bronze Age (1000 before J.C.) : Searches in the cemeteries of Douvaine and Sciez in 1977 demonstrated a strong implantation in the region.

In the first century the Allobroges (Gaulois) occupied the Chablais as has been shown by discoveries of silver coins in Sciez as well as other nearby communes.

A more in depth and modern history of Sciez and of the Chablais is available in the book: Hier, Aujourd'hui, Demain. SCIEZ : histoire, nature et traditions.

== Population ==
Historical population
Year	Pop.	±% p.a.
1968	1,617	—
1975	2,229	+4.69%
1982	2,621	+2.34%
1990	3,371	+3.20%
1999	4,268	+2.66%
2007	5,056	+2.14%
2012	5,419	+1.40%
2017	6,033	+2.17%
2023	6,447	+1.11%
Source: INSEE

== Economy ==
Sciez is a tourist town. The town hold the label holiday "Station verte" since 2005 and "Pavillon Bleu" since 2009. It also holds the Famille Plus and Geopark labels of the Chablais since 2012.

Sciez hosts numerous craftsmen, several shops and numerous associations. viticulture is present since already several centuries in the commune. The vineyards of Marignan are cultivated by three winegrowers, and several amateurs produce white wine mainly. The typical cépage of the region is the Chasselas.

== Places and monuments ==
- Église Saint-Maurice
- Château de Coudrée ou Château de Forons.
- Château de la Tour de Marignan.
- Château de Sciez.
- Musée des Sapeurs-pompiers (firefighters' museum)
- Port de plaisance de Sciez (Sciez Marina)
- Plage de Sciez (Sciez beach)
- Domaine et Théâtre du Guidou
- Musée de la Préhistoire et Géologie (Prehistory and Geology museum)
- Notre Dame de Chavannex
