= Lake Geneva =

Lake in Switzerland and France

- French: Léman; German: Genfersee; Italian: Lago di Ginevra/Lemano; Romansh: Lai da Genevra
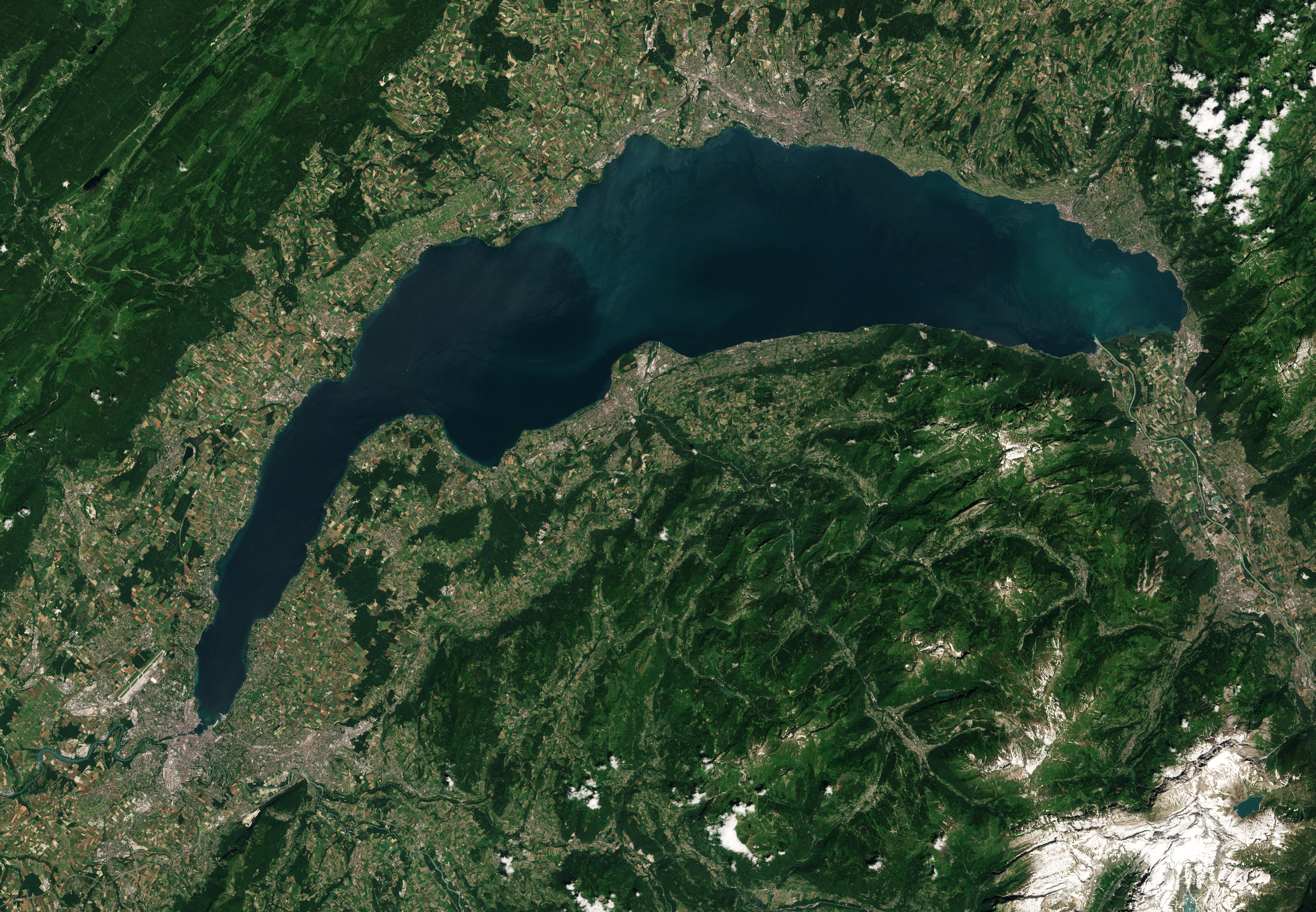
- Satellite image

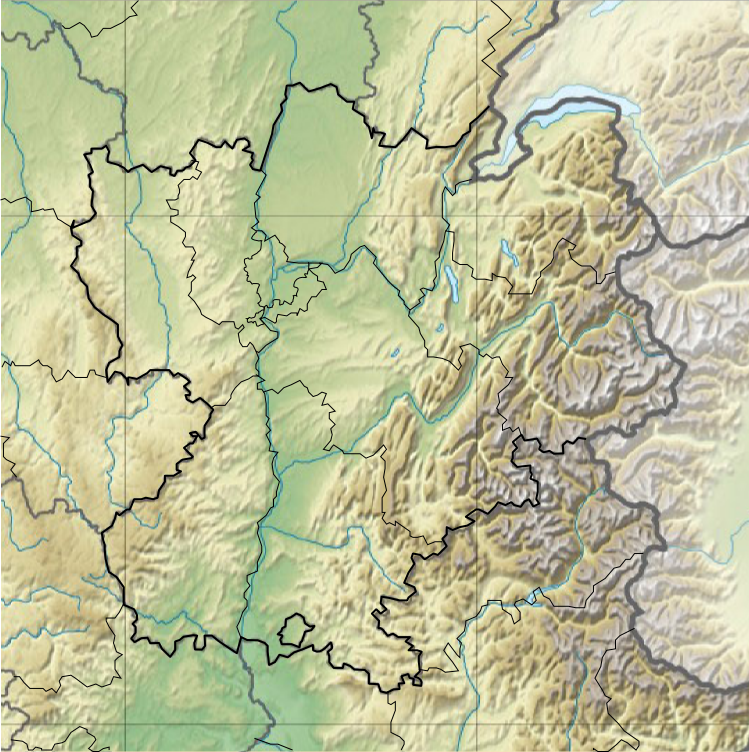
- Location within Alps Location within Canton of Vaud Location within Canton of Geneva Location within Canton of Valais Location within Switzerland Location within Rhône-Alpes Location within France
- Interactive map of Lake Geneva
- Location: Switzerland, France
- Coordinates: 46°27′N 6°33′E
- Lake type: Glacial lake
- Primary inflows: Rhône, Dranse
- Primary outflows: Rhône
- Catchment area: 7,975 square kilometres (3,079 sq mi)
- Basin countries: Switzerland, France
- Max. length: 73 km (45 mi)
- Max. width: 14 km (8.7 mi)
- Surface area: 580.03 km^{2} (224 sq mi)
- Average depth: 153.4 metres (503 feet)
- Max. depth: 310 metres (1,020 feet)
- Water volume: 89 km^{3} (72 million acre⋅ft; 21 cu mi)
- Residence time: 11.4 years
- Shore length^{1}: 156 km (97 mi)
- Surface elevation: 372 m (1,220 ft)
- Islands: Île de Peilz, Château de Chillon, Île de Salagnon, Île de la Harpe, Île Rousseau, Île de Choisi
- Settlements: Geneva (CH), Lausanne (CH), Évian (F), Montreux (CH), Thonon (F), Vevey (CH) (see list)

Ramsar Wetland
- Official name: Les Grangettes
- Designated: 11 September 1990
- Reference no.: 504

Ramsar Wetland
- Official name: Rives du Lac Léman
- Designated: 8 April 1991
- Reference no.: 519
- ^{1} Shore length is not a well-defined measure.

Lake Geneva (Note: French: le Léman [lemɑ̃], lac Léman [lak lemɑ̃], rarely lac de Genève [lak də ʒ(ə)nɛv]; Italian: Lago Lemano; German: Genfersee [ˈɡɛnfərˌzeː]; Romansh: Lai da Genevra) is a deep lake on the north side of the Alps, shared between Switzerland and France. It is one of the largest lakes in Western Europe and the largest on the course of the Rhône. Sixty percent (345.31 km^{2} or 133.32 sq mi) of the lake belongs to Switzerland (the cantons of Vaud, Geneva and Valais) and forty percent (234.71 km^{2} or 90.62 sq mi) to France (the department of Haute-Savoie).

== Name ==
While the exact origins of the name are unknown, the name lacus Lemannus was in use during the time of Julius Caesar. Lemannus comes from Ancient Greek Liménos Límnē (Λιμένος Λίμνη) meaning "port's lake". In Medieval Latin it was known as Lacus Lausonius, although this name was also used for a town or district on the lake, or Lacus Losanetes; the equivalent in Old French was Lac de Lausanne. Following the rise of Geneva it became Lac de Genève (translated into English as Lake Geneva), but Le Léman was the common name on all local maps and is the customary name in the French language. In contemporary English, the name Lake Geneva has become predominant.

== Geography ==
Lake Geneva is divided into three parts because of its different types of formation (tectonic folding, glacial erosion, sedimentation):

1. Haut Lac ('Upper Lake'), the eastern part from the Rhône estuary to the line of Meillerie–Rivaz
2. Grand Lac ('Large Lake'), the largest and deepest basin with the lake's largest width
3. Petit Lac ('Small Lake'), the most south-west, narrower, and less-deep part from Yvoire–Promenthoux next Prangins to the exit in Geneva

According to the Swiss Federal Office of Topography, Swisstopo, Lac de Genève designates that part of the Petit Lac which lies within the cantonal borders of Geneva (excluding the cantonal exclave Céligny), so about from Versoix–Hermance to the Rhône outflow in Geneva.

The Chablais Alps border is its southern shore, and the western Bernese Alps lie over its eastern side. The high summits of Grand Combin and Mont Blanc are visible from some places.

The lake lies on the course of the Rhône. The river has its source at the Rhône Glacier near the Grimsel Pass to the east of the lake and flows down through the canton of Valais, entering the lake between Villeneuve and Le Bouveret, before flowing slowly towards its egress at Geneva. Other tributaries are La Dranse, L'Aubonne, La Morges, La Venoge, La Vuachère, and La Veveyse.

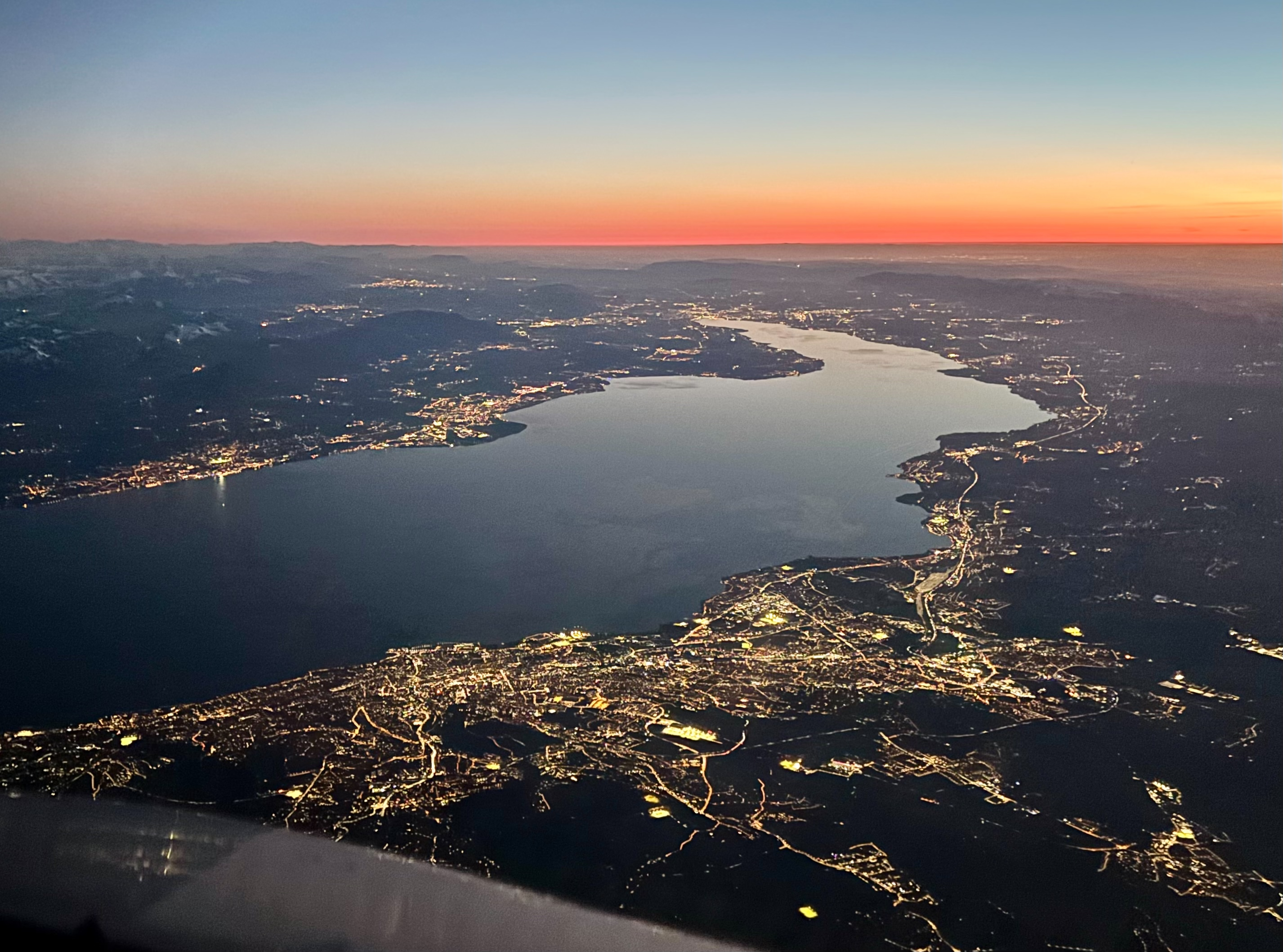
Aerial view of the lake and surrounding cities. Geneva is situated at the south-western end of Lake Geneva, where the Rhône flows out.

Lake Geneva is the largest body of water in Switzerland, and greatly exceeds in size all others that are connected with the main valleys of the Alps. It is in the shape of a crescent, with the horns pointing south, the northern shore being 95 km (59 mi) and the southern shore 72 km (45 mi) in length. The crescent form was more regular in a recent geological period, when the lake extended to Bex, about 18 km (11 mi) south of Villeneuve. The detritus of the Rhône has filled up this portion of the bed of the lake, and it appears that within the historical period, the waters extended about 2 km (1.2 mi) beyond the present eastern margin of the lake. The greatest depth of the lake, in the broad portion between Évian-les-Bains and Lausanne, where it is just 13 km (8.1 mi) in width, has been measured as 310 m (1,020 ft), putting the bottom of the lake at 62 m (203 ft) above sea level. The lake's surface is the lowest point of the cantons of Valais and Vaud. The culminating point of the lake's drainage basin is Monte Rosa at 4,634 metres above sea level.

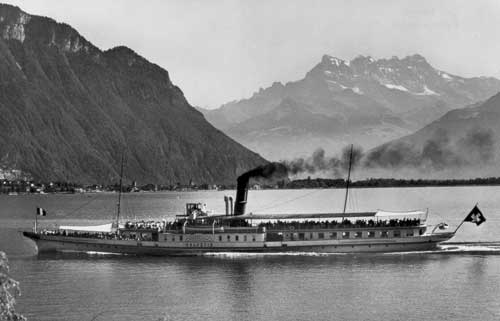
The paddle steamer of the Compagnie Générale de Navigation sur le lac Léman in 1926 near Vevey with the Dents du Midi in background

The shipping company Compagnie Générale de Navigation sur le lac Léman offers shipping trips on the lake.

Sign showing the routes taken by ships on Lake Geneva

The beauty of the shores of the lake and of the sites of many of the places near its banks has long been celebrated. However, it is only from the eastern end of the lake, between Vevey and Villeneuve, that the scenery assumes an Alpine character. On the south side, the mountains of Savoy and Valais are for the most part rugged and sombre, while those of the northern shore fall in gentle vine-covered slopes, thickly set with villages and castles.

The snowy peaks of the Mont Blanc Massif are shut out from the western end of the lake by the Voirons mountain, and from its eastern end by the bolder summits of the Grammont, Cornettes de Bise, and Dent d'Oche, but are seen from Geneva, and between Nyon and Morges. From Vevey to Bex, where the lake originally extended, the shores are enclosed by comparatively high and bold mountains, and the vista terminates in the grand portal of the defile of St. Maurice, cleft to a depth of nearly 2,700 m (8,900 ft) between the opposite peaks of the Dents du Midi and the Dent de Morcles.

The shore between Nyon and Lausanne is called La Côte because it is flatter. Between Lausanne and Vevey it is called Lavaux and is famous for its hilly vineyards.

The average surface elevation of 372 m (1,220 ft) above sea level is controlled by the Seujet Dam in Geneva.

== Climate ==
Due to climate change, the average temperature of deep water (more than 300 metres or 980 feet deep) increased from 4.4 °C (39.9 °F) in 1963 to 5.5 °C (41.9 °F) in 2016, while the average temperature of surface water (five metres or 16 feet deep) increased from 10.9 °C (51.6 °F) in 1970 to 12.9 °C (55.2 °F) in 2016 (up 2 °C or 3.6 °F in 46 years).

Climate data for Genève–Cointrin (Reference period 1981–2010), Records (1901–2015)
Month	Jan	Feb	Mar	Apr	May	Jun	Jul	Aug	Sep	Oct	Nov	Dec	Year
Record high °C (°F)	17.3 (63.1)	20.6 (69.1)	24.9 (76.8)	27.5 (81.5)	33.8 (92.8)	36.5 (97.7)	39.7 (103.5)	37.6 (99.7)	34.8 (94.6)	27.3 (81.1)	23.2 (73.8)	20.8 (69.4)	39.7 (103.5)
Mean daily maximum °C (°F)	4.5 (40.1)	6.3 (43.3)	11.2 (52.2)	14.9 (58.8)	19.7 (67.5)	23.5 (74.3)	26.5 (79.7)	25.8 (78.4)	20.9 (69.6)	15.4 (59.7)	8.8 (47.8)	5.3 (41.5)	15.2 (59.4)
Daily mean °C (°F)	1.5 (34.7)	2.5 (36.5)	6.2 (43.2)	9.7 (49.5)	14.2 (57.6)	17.7 (63.9)	20.2 (68.4)	19.5 (67.1)	15.4 (59.7)	11.1 (52.0)	5.5 (41.9)	2.8 (37.0)	10.5 (50.9)
Mean daily minimum °C (°F)	−1.3 (29.7)	−1 (30)	1.6 (34.9)	4.8 (40.6)	9.1 (48.4)	12.3 (54.1)	14.4 (57.9)	14.0 (57.2)	10.8 (51.4)	7.4 (45.3)	2.4 (36.3)	0.1 (32.2)	6.2 (43.2)
Record low °C (°F)	−19.9 (−3.8)	−20.0 (−4.0)	−13.3 (8.1)	−5.2 (22.6)	−2.2 (28.0)	1.3 (34.3)	3.0 (37.4)	4.9 (40.8)	0.2 (32.4)	−4.7 (23.5)	−10.9 (12.4)	−17.0 (1.4)	−20.0 (−4.0)
Average precipitation mm (inches)	76 (3.0)	68 (2.7)	70 (2.8)	72 (2.8)	84 (3.3)	92 (3.6)	79 (3.1)	82 (3.2)	100 (3.9)	105 (4.1)	88 (3.5)	90 (3.5)	1,005 (39.6)
Average snowfall cm (inches)	10.8 (4.3)	8.1 (3.2)	2.8 (1.1)	0.2 (0.1)	0.0 (0.0)	0.0 (0.0)	0.0 (0.0)	0.0 (0.0)	0.0 (0.0)	0.0 (0.0)	2.8 (1.1)	7.4 (2.9)	32.1 (12.6)
Average precipitation days (≥ 1.0 mm)	9.5	8.1	9.0	8.9	10.6	9.3	7.6	7.9	8.1	10.1	9.9	10.0	109.0
Average snowy days (≥ 1.0 cm)	2.5	2.0	0.9	0.1	0.0	0.0	0.0	0.0	0.0	0.0	0.7	2.0	8.2
Average relative humidity (%)	81	76	69	67	69	66	64	67	73	79	81	81	73
Mean monthly sunshine hours	59	88	154	177	197	235	263	237	185	117	66	49	1,828
Percentage possible sunshine	23	33	45	46	45	53	58	58	53	38	26	20	44
Source 1: MeteoSwiss
Source 2: KNMI

Climate data for Pully (Lausanne) (1981–2010), Extremes (1981–2010)
Month	Jan	Feb	Mar	Apr	May	Jun	Jul	Aug	Sep	Oct	Nov	Dec	Year
Record high °C (°F)	14.9 (58.8)	15.8 (60.4)	22.6 (72.7)	25.5 (77.9)	31.3 (88.3)	33.6 (92.5)	35.2 (95.4)	37.1 (98.8)	28.6 (83.5)	25.4 (77.7)	19.8 (67.6)	17.7 (63.9)	37.1 (98.8)
Mean daily maximum °C (°F)	4.4 (39.9)	5.6 (42.1)	10.1 (50.2)	14.0 (57.2)	18.7 (65.7)	22.4 (72.3)	25.0 (77.0)	24.4 (75.9)	19.8 (67.6)	14.6 (58.3)	8.6 (47.5)	5.3 (41.5)	14.4 (57.9)
Daily mean °C (°F)	1.2 (34.2)	3.0 (37.4)	6.6 (43.9)	10.0 (50.0)	14.4 (57.9)	17.8 (64.0)	20.3 (68.5)	19.7 (67.5)	15.8 (60.4)	11.6 (52.9)	6.1 (43.0)	3.2 (37.8)	10.9 (51.6)
Mean daily minimum °C (°F)	0.3 (32.5)	0.7 (33.3)	3.5 (38.3)	6.4 (43.5)	10.7 (51.3)	13.8 (56.8)	16.1 (61.0)	15.9 (60.6)	12.6 (54.7)	9.1 (48.4)	4.2 (39.6)	1.4 (34.5)	7.9 (46.2)
Record low °C (°F)	−16.7 (1.9)	−12.7 (9.1)	−9.1 (15.6)	−2.9 (26.8)	2.1 (35.8)	5.2 (41.4)	9 (48)	8.2 (46.8)	4.4 (39.9)	−1.2 (29.8)	−6.2 (20.8)	−10.1 (13.8)	−16.7 (1.9)
Average precipitation mm (inches)	77 (3.0)	67 (2.6)	78 (3.1)	87 (3.4)	117 (4.6)	112 (4.4)	92 (3.6)	110 (4.3)	114 (4.5)	113 (4.4)	93 (3.7)	92 (3.6)	1,153 (45.4)
Average snowfall cm (inches)	10.9 (4.3)	14.3 (5.6)	1.6 (0.6)	0.2 (0.1)	0.0 (0.0)	0.0 (0.0)	0.0 (0.0)	0.0 (0.0)	0.0 (0.0)	0.0 (0.0)	1.1 (0.4)	7.0 (2.8)	35.1 (13.8)
Average precipitation days (≥ 1.0 mm)	10.1	8.8	10.2	9.8	12.1	10.4	9.0	9.5	8.8	10.1	10.2	10.7	119.7
Average snowy days (≥ 1.0 cm)	2.9	2.8	1.3	0.1	0.0	0.0	0.0	0.0	0.0	0.0	0.8	1.9	9.8
Average relative humidity (%)	78	73	68	66	67	66	65	68	73	78	78	78	72
Mean monthly sunshine hours	72	97	159	179	201	229	252	234	183	128	79	58	1,872
Percentage possible sunshine	29	37	46	47	48	54	59	58	52	42	32	26	46
Source 1: MeteoSwiss
Source 2: StatistiqueVaud

=== Bise ===
Lake Geneva (and particularly the lakeside parts of the city of Geneva) can be affected by the cold bise, a northeasterly wind. This can lead to severe icing in winter. The strength of the bise wind can be determined by the difference in air pressure between Geneva and Güttingen in canton of Thurgau. The bise arises when the air pressure in Güttingen is higher than in Geneva.

== Environment ==
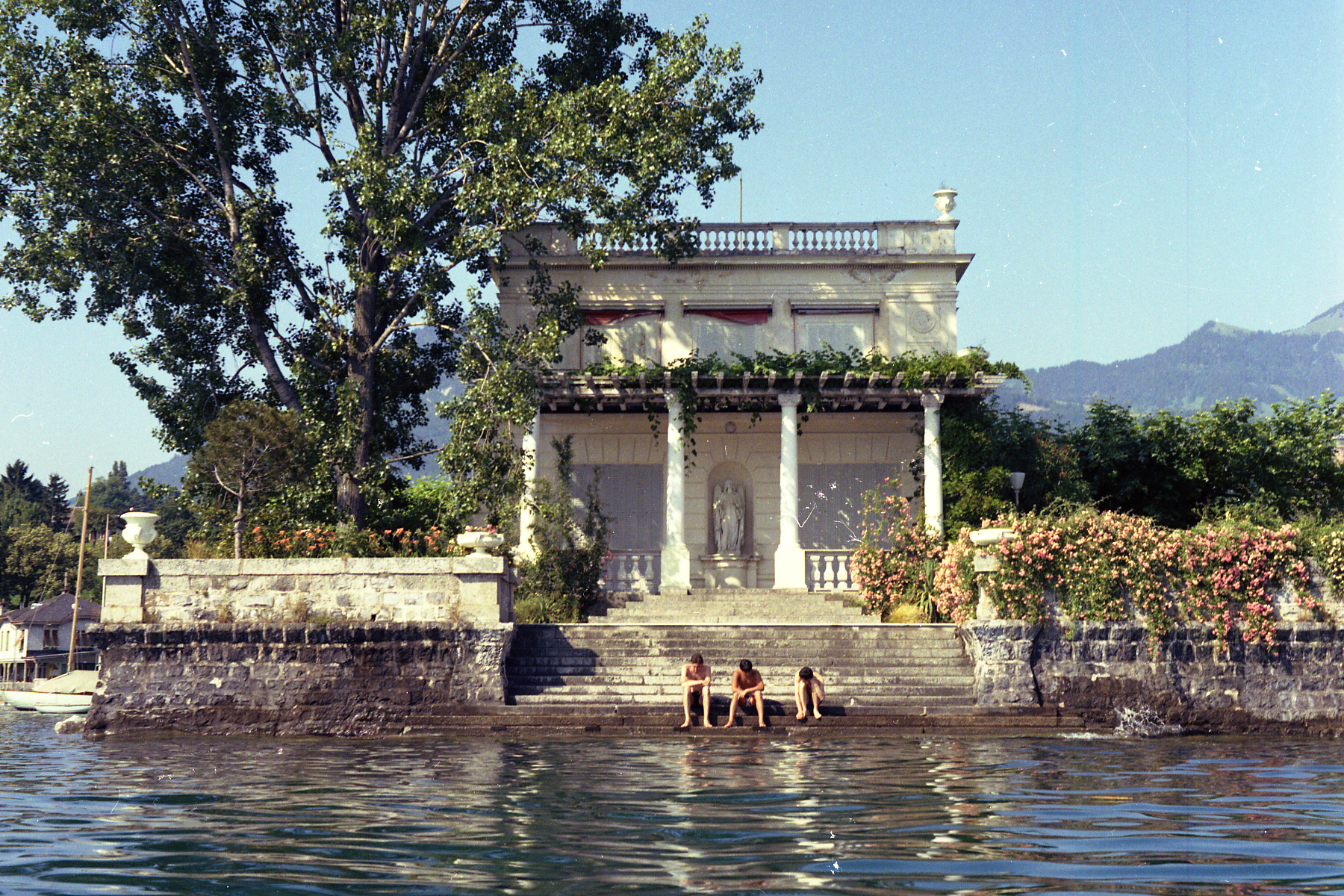
Bath house of a private home on the lake, in canton of Vaud, 1968

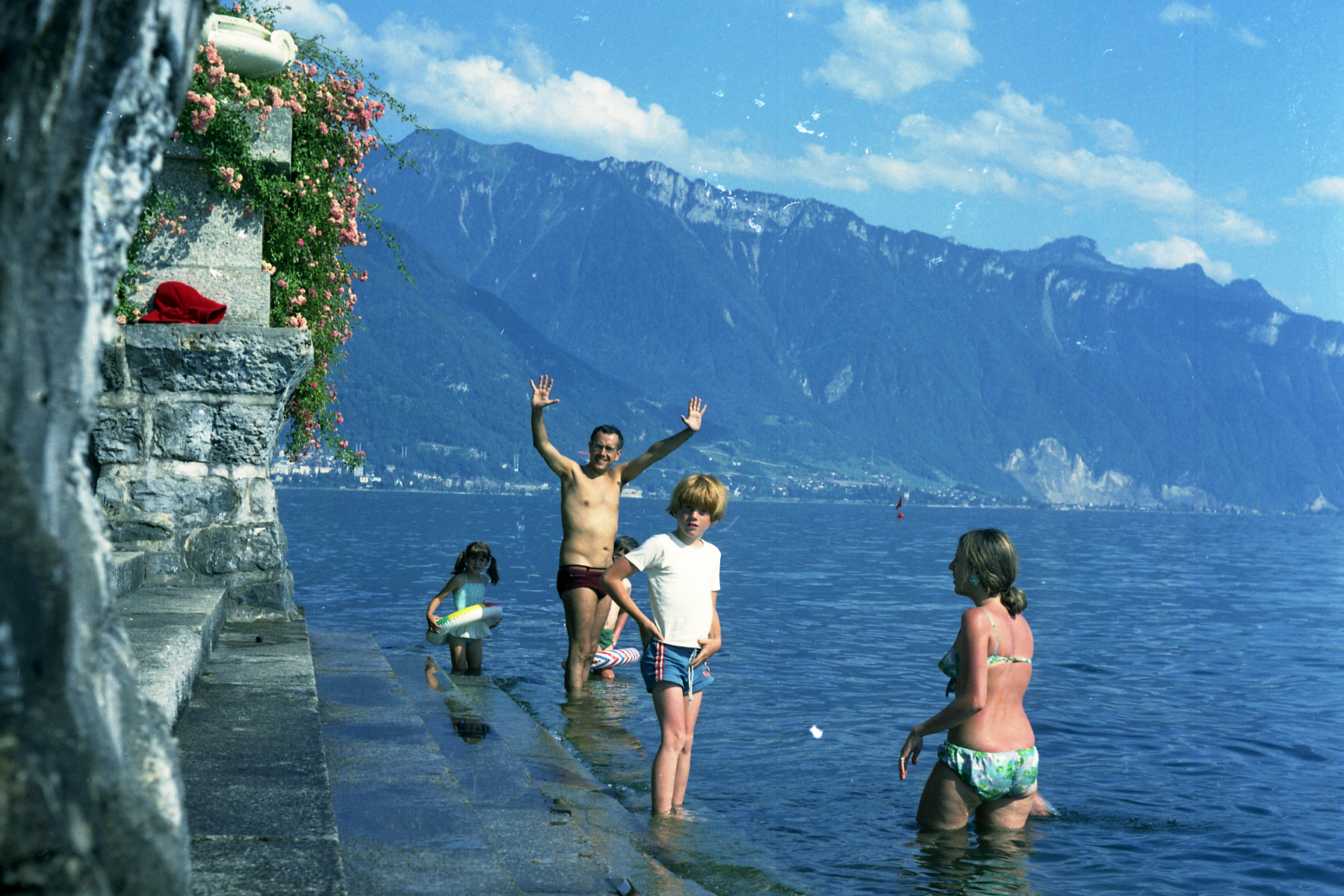
Swimming in the lake

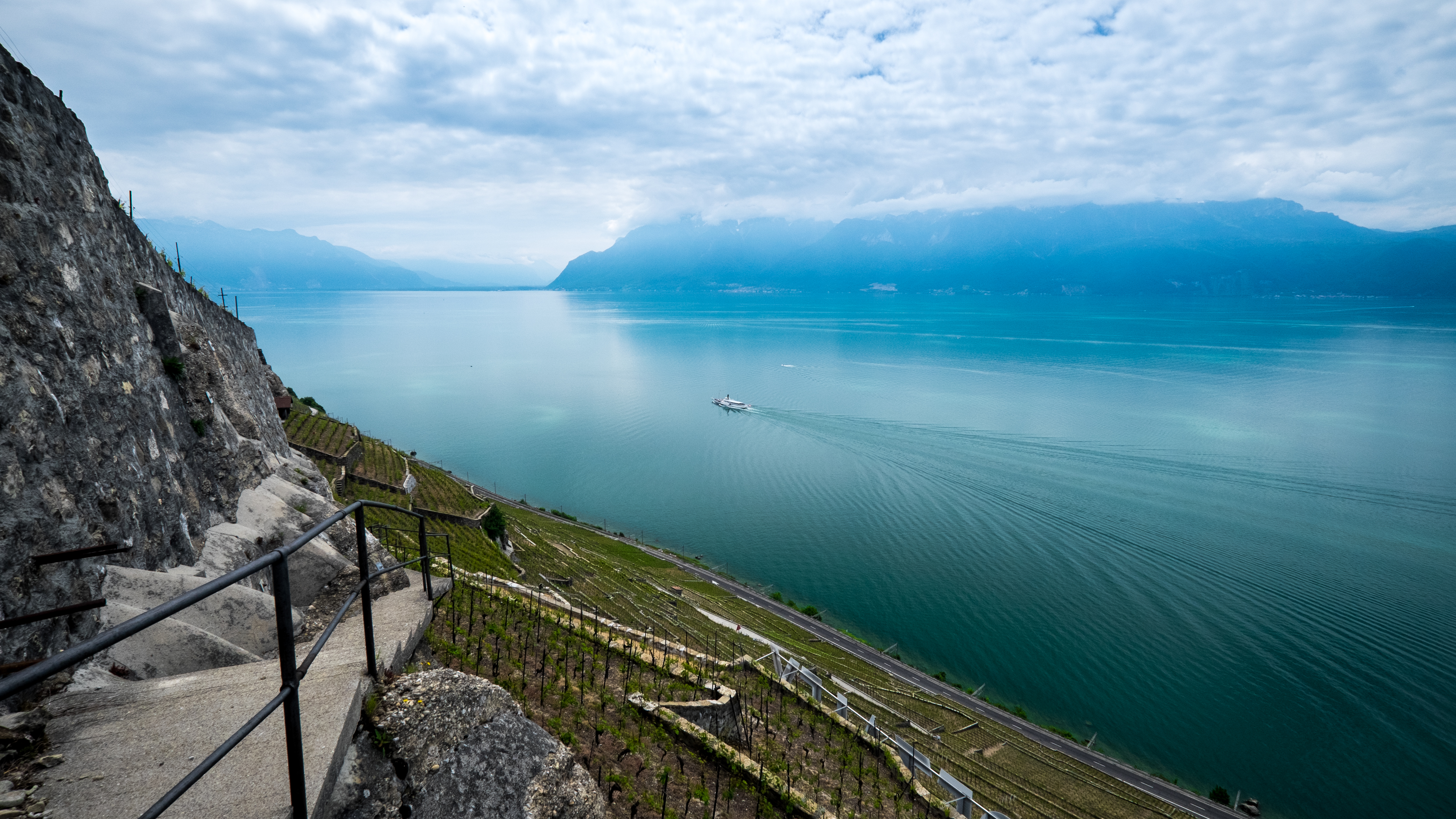
Lavaux vineyards on Lake Geneva

In the late 1960s, pollution made it dangerous to swim at some beaches of the lake, and visibility underwater was near zero. By the 1980s, intense environmental pollution (eutrophication) had almost wiped out all the fish. Endemic whitefish species Coregonus fera was last recorded in the lake in 1920 and is now extinct. Although the name fera is still used for the only coregonid present in the lake, this is not the original species but the introduced C. palaea. Today, pollution levels have been dramatically cut back, and it is again considered safe to swim in the lake. Major leisure activities practiced include sailing, wind surfing, boating (including water skiing and wake-boarding), rowing, scuba diving, and bathing.

Since 2016, the biodiversity of the lake has been dramatically changed due to the arrival of the invasive quagga mussel. Mussels now coat the entire floor of the lake, destroying the native food chain and leaving the lake vulnerable to poisonous blue-green algae. In 2024, scientists found that 100 % of the biomass they sampled from the lake floor were quagga mussels.

== Sport events ==
Yacht racing is a popular sport, and high-performance catamarans have been developed specifically for the lake. The design of the Alinghi 5, the defender of the 2010 America's Cup, was influenced by those racing catamarans. The best-known event, the Bol d'or (not to be confused with other events having the same name) runs from Geneva to the end of the lake and back.

The Tour du Lac rowing event also takes place on Lake Geneva. Competitors row once around the entire lake, making this 160-kilometre (99 mi) event the longest non-stop rowing regatta in the world.

Several competitions for swimmers are organised yearly, the longest of which spans the length of the lake from Chillon Castle to Geneva (70km) and is known as The Signature. Other events include the crossing of the lake from Lausanne to Evian (13km), from Montreux to Clarens (1.8 km), in Geneva (1.8 km), all in summer, and the Coupe de Noël, 125 m in Geneva in December.

== Towns and villages ==
The largest metropolitan areas along Lake Geneva, along with their populations, are:

1. Geneva (190,000 city, 1 million metro area)
2. Lausanne (130,000 city, 420,000 metro area)
3. Thonon-les-Bains (32,000 town population)
4. Montreux (25,000 town, 85,000 metro area)

List of towns and villages on Lake Geneva Starting from the entry of Rhône River on the east end, with the southern shore to the left.
	Southern shore	Northern shore
Haut Lac	Canton of Valais (VS): Le Bouveret; St-Gingolph; Haute-Savoie: Saint-Gingolph; Meillerie	Canton of Vaud (VD): Noville; Villeneuve VD; Veytaux; Territet; Montreux; Clarens; La Tour-de-Peilz; Vevey; Corseaux; St-Saphorin (Lavaux); Rivaz
Grand Lac	Haute-Savoie: Lugrin; Maxilly-sur-Léman; Évian-les-Bains; Amphion-les-Bains; Thonon-les-Bains; Anthy-sur-Léman; Sciez; Excenevex; Yvoire	VD: Puidoux; Cully; Grandvaux; Villette (Lavaux); Lutry; Paudex; Pully; Lausanne with Ouchy and Vidy; St-Sulpice VD; Préverenges; Morges; Tolochenaz; St-Prex; Buchillon; Allaman; Perroy; Rolle; Bursinel; Dully; Gland
Petit Lac ( * Lac de Genève, see also Geography)	Haute-Savoie: Nernier; Messery; Chens-sur-Léman; Canton of Geneva (GE): Hermance^{*}; Anières^{*}; Corsier^{*}; Collonge-Bellerive^{*}; Vésenaz^{*}; Cologny^{*}	VD: Prangins, Promenthoux; Nyon; Crans-près-Céligny; Céligny (exclave of GE in VD); Founex; Coppet; Tannay; Mies; GE: Versoix^{*}; Genthod^{*}; Bellevue^{*}; Pregny-Chambésy^{*}
Petit Lac ( * Lac de Genève, see also Geography)	Geneva^{*}	

== Topographic map ==
Lake Geneva on the Swiss National Map (1:50'000)

== Notable residents ==
Edmund Ludlow, famous as one who had signed the death warrant of English King Charles I, was granted on 16 April 1662 protection in and continued to live at Vevey until his death in 1692. Mary and Percy Shelley and Lord Byron holidayed by the lake and wrote ghost stories, one of which became the basis for the novel Frankenstein. The Empress Elisabeth of Austria (Sisi) was stabbed to death on the quayside in Geneva in September 1898. Vladimir Lenin rented a little "chalet" at the French bank, near Geneva. Actor Charlie Chaplin spent his final years and died in Vevey (there is a memorial statue of him along the promenade; his home at Corsier-sur-Vevey is now a museum of his life and career). Actors Noël Coward, James Mason, Sir Peter Ustinov, Richard Burton, and Audrey Hepburn all lived in villages on the shores of or in view of the lake. David Bowie moved to a chalet to the north of Lake Geneva in 1976, which inspired him to take up painting and informed the first stages of the "Berlin Trilogy". Pop singer Phil Collins lives in a home overlooking the lake. Rock band Queen owned and operated Mountain Recording Studios (which is still in use today) in Montreux, and a statue of lead singer Freddie Mercury, who also owned a second home in Montreux, stands on the northern shore of the lake. Writer Vladimir Nabokov also took residence in Montreux, where he died in 1977. Former Formula 1 driver Michael Schumacher lives with his family in a home overlooking the lake. Filmmaker Jean-Luc Godard lived and made several of his films in the area.

== Notable events ==
In 563, according to the writings of Gregory of Tours and Marius Aventicensis, a tsunami wave swept along the lake, destroying the fort of Tauredunum and other settlements, and causing numerous deaths in Geneva. Simulations indicate that this Tauredunum event was most likely caused by a massive landslide near the Rhône delta, which caused a wave eight metres (26 ft) high to reach Geneva within 70 minutes. In 888, the town was part of the new Kingdom of Burgundy, and, with it, was absorbed into the Holy Roman Empire in 1033.

In 1827, Lake Geneva was the site for the first measurement of the speed of sound in (fresh) water. French mathematician Jacques Charles François Sturm and Swiss physicist Daniel Collodon used two moored boats, separated by a measured distance, as the transmitting and receiving platforms for the sounds of exploding gunpowder. The loud airborne sound coupled into the lake, establishing a loud underwater sound that could be measured at a distance. The flash of the exploding gunpowder provided the visual starting cue for the timepiece, and the underwater explosion sound striking a bell provided the finish cue.

A total of four submarines have plied the depths of Lake Geneva. In 1964, Jacques Piccard launched a tourist-oriented submarine, the Auguste Piccard (named for his explorer father), for the Swiss National Exhibition, meant to honor the Expo 64 theme of accomplishments by Swiss engineers and industry. After operating through to 1965 in Lake Geneva, Piccard used the vessel for scientific exploration in other parts of the world. Piccard later built the F.-A. Forel, launched in Lake Geneva in 1978 and used primarily for scientific research until it was retired in 2005. In 2011, in a collaborative operation led by École Polytechnique Fédérale de Lausanne, two Mir submersibles were used for ten weeks to conduct extensive scientific research in Lake Geneva.

== See also ==
- Lake Geneva region
