= Loisin =

- Commune
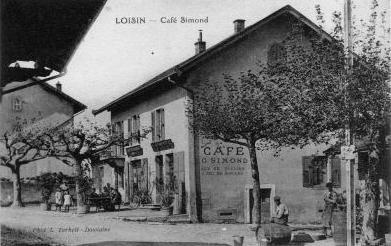
- Loisin in 1920

- Coat of arms
- Location of Loisin
- Location within France Location within Auvergne-Rhône-Alpes
- Coordinates: 46°17′28″N 6°18′36″E
- Country: France
- Region: Auvergne-Rhône-Alpes
- Department: Haute-Savoie
- Arrondissement: Thonon-les-Bains
- Canton: Sciez
- Intercommunality: Thonon Agglomération

Government
  - Mayor (2020–2026): Laetitia Venner
- Area^{1}: 7.8 km^{2} (3.0 sq mi)
- Highest elevation: 2 m (6.6 ft)
- Lowest elevation: 1 m (3.3 ft)
- Population (2023): 1,768
  - Density: 230/km^{2} (590/sq mi)
- Time zone: UTC+01:00 (CET)
  - Summer (DST): UTC+02:00 (CEST)
- INSEE/Postal code: 74150 /74140
- Website: www.loisin.fr
- ^{1} French Land Register data, which excludes lakes, ponds, glaciers > 1 km^{2} (0.386 sq mi or 247 acres) and river estuaries.

Loisin (French pronunciation: [lwazɛ̃]; Arpitan: Luèsin) is a commune in the Haute-Savoie department in the Auvergne-Rhône-Alpes region in south-eastern France. It has approximately 1500 inhabitants.

== Monuments and places ==
- Saint-Affre Church

== Politics and administration ==
=== Administrative situation ===
In 1860 after the annexation from the Savoy, Loisin became part of the canton of Douvaine. Since 2015, it belongs to the canton of Sciez after the cantonal redistribution law from 2014. The commune is part of the communauté d'agglomération Thonon Agglomération.

=== Sustainable development policy ===
In 2008, the commune engaged a Sustainable Development policy with the creation of an agenda 21.

== Notable people ==
- Maurice Dunand(1898-1987), archeologist.

== See also ==
- Communes of the Haute-Savoie department
