= Nernier =

- Commune
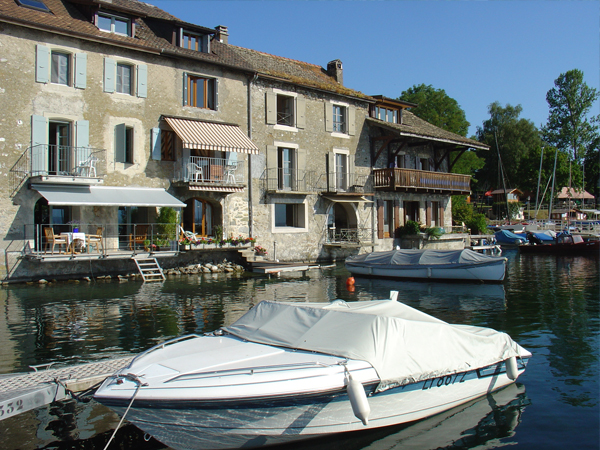
- Houses around the harbour

- Coat of arms
- Location of Nernier
- Location within France Location within Auvergne-Rhône-Alpes
- Coordinates: 46°21′56″N 6°18′15″E
- Country: France
- Region: Auvergne-Rhône-Alpes
- Department: Haute-Savoie
- Arrondissement: Thonon-les-Bains
- Canton: Sciez
- Intercommunality: Thonon Agglomération

Government
  - Mayor (2022–2026): Christian Breuza
- Area^{1}: 1.82 km^{2} (0.70 sq mi)
- Population (2023): 423
  - Density: 232/km^{2} (602/sq mi)
- Time zone: UTC+01:00 (CET)
  - Summer (DST): UTC+02:00 (CEST)
- INSEE/Postal code: 74199 /74140
- ^{1} French Land Register data, which excludes lakes, ponds, glaciers > 1 km^{2} (0.386 sq mi or 247 acres) and river estuaries.

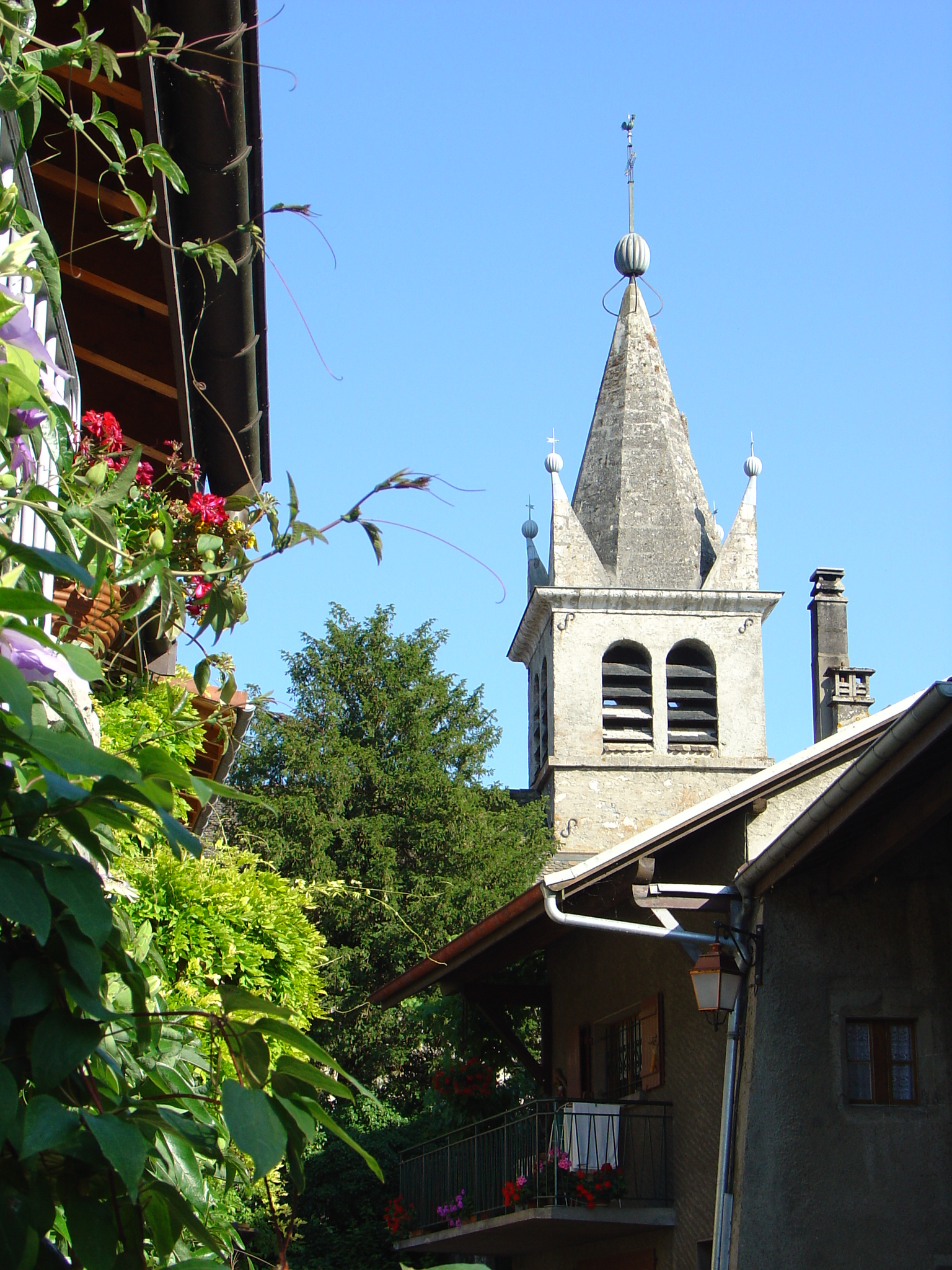

Nernier (French pronunciation: [nɛʁnje]; Arpitan: Nèrniér) is a French village on the southern shore of Lake Geneva, in the department of Haute-Savoie.

Administratively classified a commune, Nernier shares a medieval village center and floral displays with the larger and better-known neighbouring village of Yvoire.

== See also ==
- Communes of Haute-Savoie
