= Canton of Sciez =

Coordinates: 46.33°N 6.37°E

The canton of Sciez is an administrative division of the Haute-Savoie department, southeastern France. It was created at the French canton reorganisation which came into effect in March 2015. Its seat is in Sciez.

It consists of the following communes:

1. Anthy-sur-Léman
2. Ballaison
3. Boëge
4. Bogève
5. Bons-en-Chablais
6. Brenthonne
7. Burdignin
8. Chens-sur-Léman
9. Douvaine
10. Excenevex
11. Fessy
12. Habère-Lullin
13. Habère-Poche
14. Loisin
15. Lully
16. Margencel
17. Massongy
18. Messery
19. Nernier
20. Saint-André-de-Boëge
21. Saxel
22. Sciez
23. Veigy-Foncenex
24. Villard
25. Yvoire
