= Lully, Haute-Savoie =

Lully
- Commune
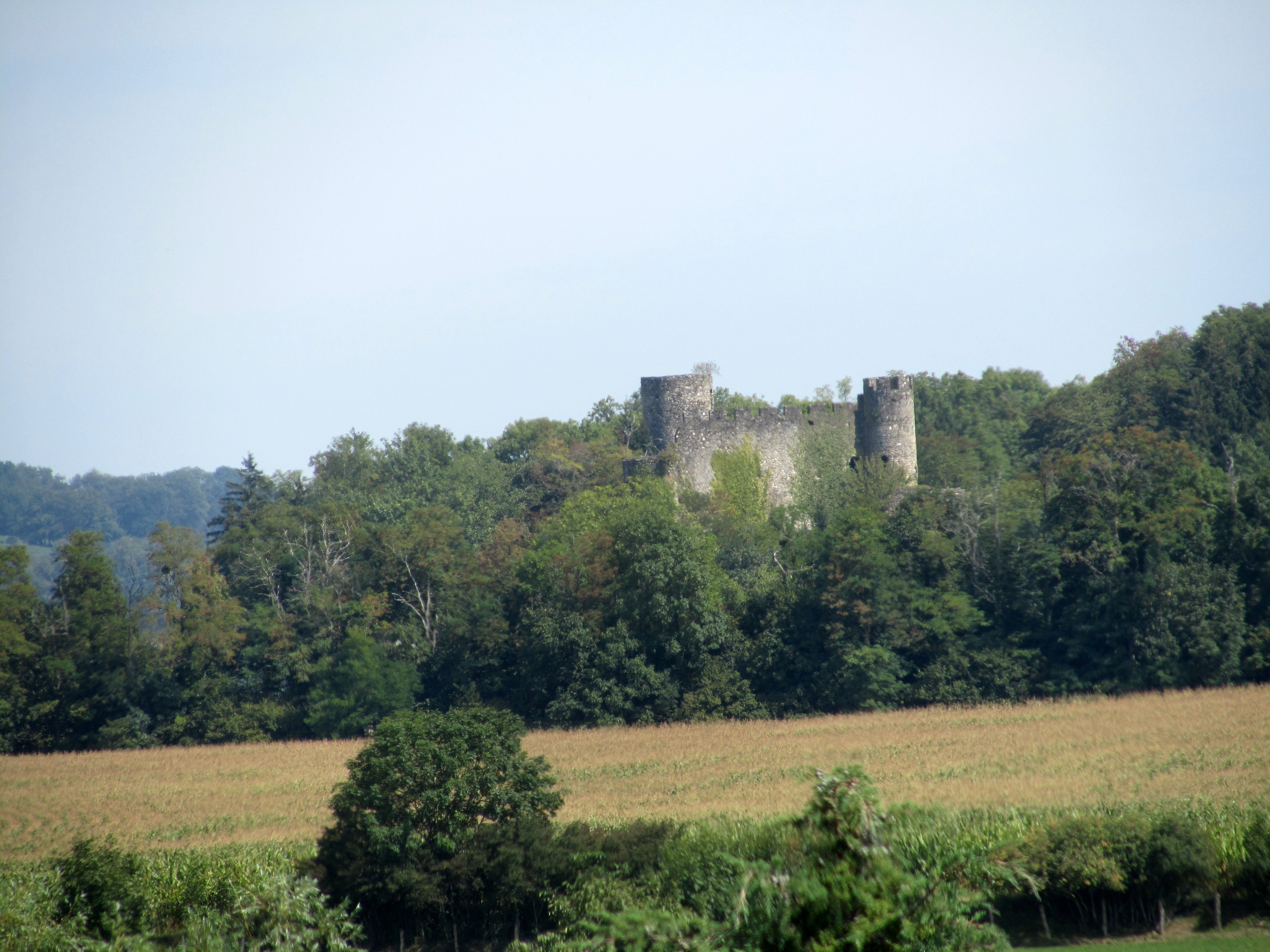
- The Château of la Rochette

- Coat of arms
- Location of Lully
- Location within France Location within Auvergne-Rhône-Alpes
- Coordinates: 46°17′02″N 6°24′56″E
- Country: France
- Region: Auvergne-Rhône-Alpes
- Department: Haute-Savoie
- Arrondissement: Thonon-les-Bains
- Canton: Sciez
- Intercommunality: Thonon Agglomération

Government
  - Mayor (2020–2026): René Girard
- Area^{1}: 4.8 km^{2} (1.9 sq mi)
- Highest elevation: 584 m (1,916 ft)
- Lowest elevation: 470 m (1,540 ft)
- Population (2023): 764
  - Density: 160/km^{2} (410/sq mi)
- Demonym: Lullois / Lulloise
- Time zone: UTC+01:00 (CET)
  - Summer (DST): UTC+02:00 (CEST)
- INSEE/Postal code: 74156 /74890
- ^{1} French Land Register data, which excludes lakes, ponds, glaciers > 1 km^{2} (0.386 sq mi or 247 acres) and river estuaries.

Lully (French pronunciation: [lyli]; Arpitan: Lelyi) is a commune in the Haute-Savoie department in the Auvergne-Rhône-Alpes region in south-eastern France.

== See also ==
- Communes of the Haute-Savoie department
