= Margencel =

- Commune
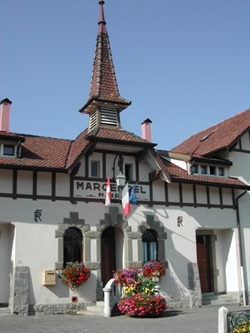
- The town hall in Margencel

- Coat of arms
- Location of Margencel
- Location within France Location within Auvergne-Rhône-Alpes
- Coordinates: 46°20′20″N 6°25′58″E
- Country: France
- Region: Auvergne-Rhône-Alpes
- Department: Haute-Savoie
- Arrondissement: Thonon-les-Bains
- Canton: Sciez
- Intercommunality: Thonon Agglomération

Government
  - Mayor (2020–2026): Patrick Bondaz
- Area^{1}: 7.38 km^{2} (2.85 sq mi)
- Highest elevation: 531 m (1,742 ft)
- Lowest elevation: 372 m (1,220 ft)
- Population (2023): 2,273
  - Density: 308/km^{2} (798/sq mi)
- Time zone: UTC+01:00 (CET)
  - Summer (DST): UTC+02:00 (CEST)
- INSEE/Postal code: 74163 /74200
- ^{1} French Land Register data, which excludes lakes, ponds, glaciers > 1 km^{2} (0.386 sq mi or 247 acres) and river estuaries.

Margencel (French pronunciation: [maʁʒɑ̃sɛl]; Arpitan: Mardanfé) is a commune in the Haute-Savoie department in the Auvergne-Rhône-Alpes region in south-eastern France.

== Population ==
Historical population
Year	Pop.	±% p.a.
1968	660	—
1975	887	+4.31%
1982	1,035	+2.23%
1990	1,262	+2.51%
1999	1,429	+1.39%
2007	1,697	+2.17%
2012	1,945	+2.77%
2017	2,145	+1.98%
2023	2,273	+0.97%
Source: INSEE

== Landmark ==
- St. Lawrence Church

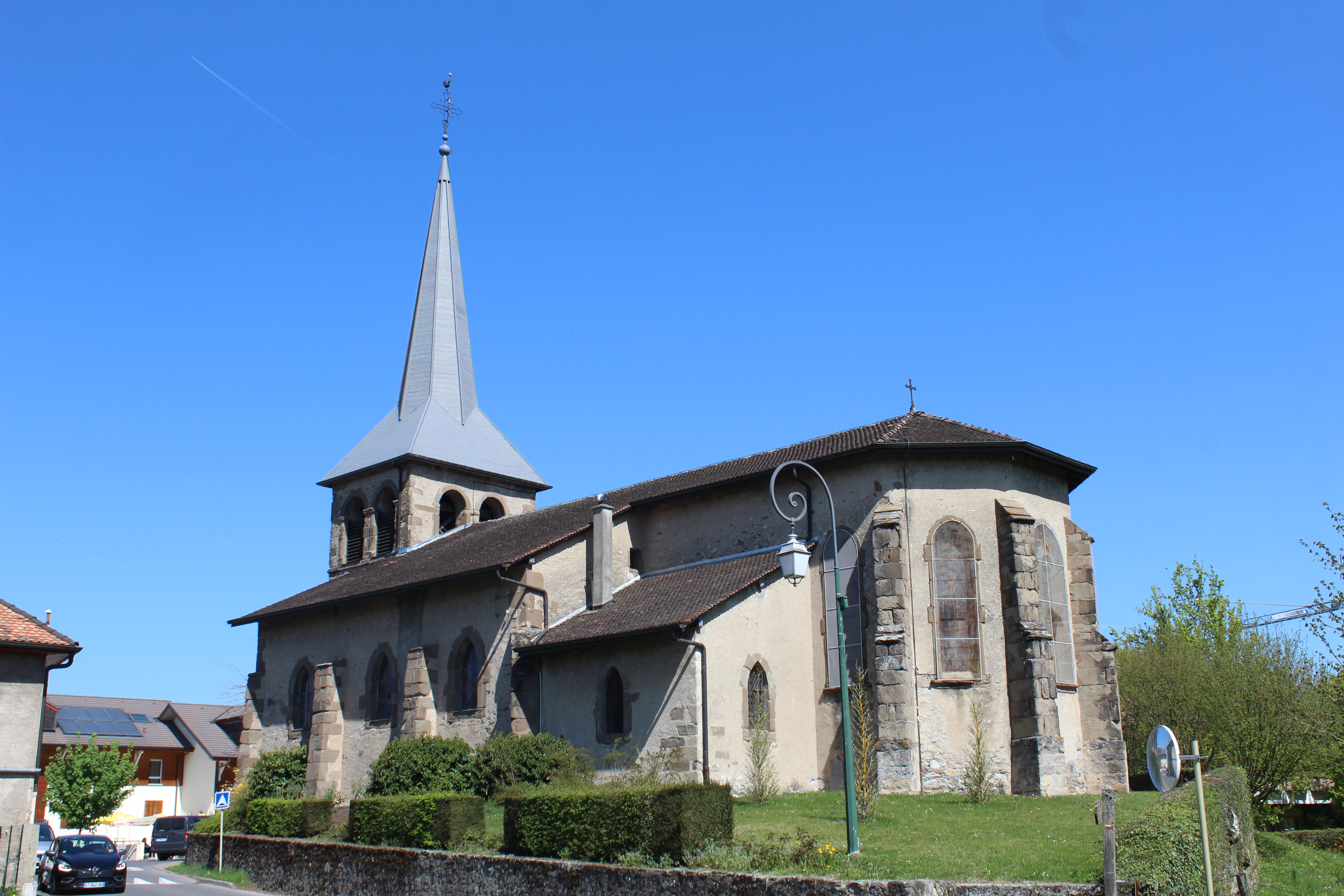
St. Lawrence Church

== See also ==
- Communes of the Haute-Savoie department
