= Thonon Agglomération =

- Communauté d'agglomération
- Interactive map of Thonon Agglomération
- Coordinates: 46°20′N 06°30′E
- Country: France
- Region: Auvergne-Rhône-Alpes
- Department: Haute-Savoie
- No. of communes: {{{nbcomm}}}
- Established: 2017
- Area: 238.9 km^{2} (92.2 sq mi)
- Population (2019): 90,531
  - Density: 378.9/km^{2} (981.5/sq mi)
- Website: www.thononagglo.fr

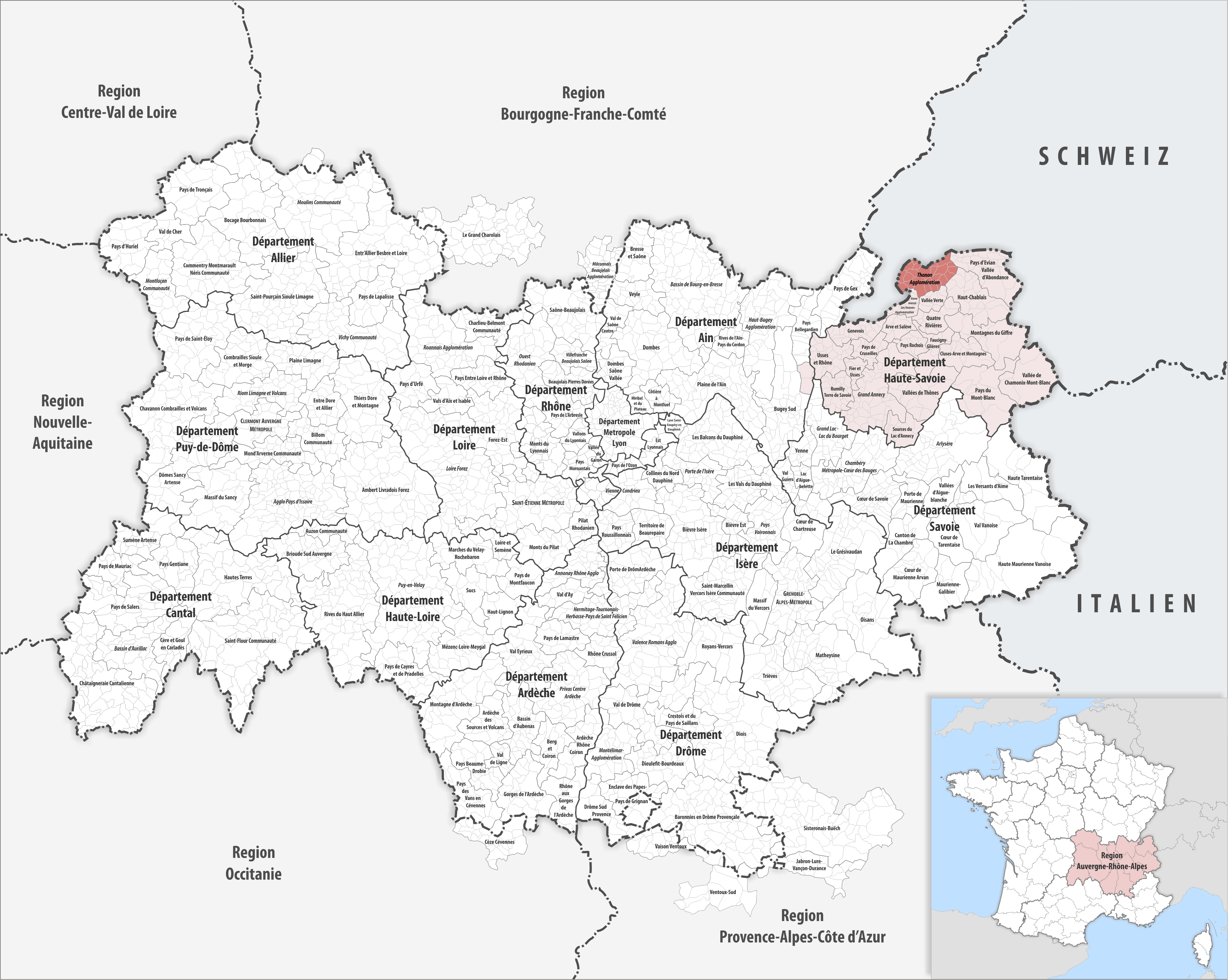
Location of Thonon within France

Thonon Agglomération is the communauté d'agglomération, an intercommunal structure, centred on the city of Thonon-les-Bains. It is located in the Haute-Savoie department, in the Auvergne-Rhône-Alpes region, eastern France. Created in 2017, its seat is in Thonon-les-Bains. Its area is 238.9 km^{2}. Its population was 90,531 in 2019, of which 35,826 in Thonon-les-Bains proper.

== Composition ==
The communauté d'agglomération consists of the following 25 communes:

1. Allinges
2. Anthy-sur-Léman
3. Armoy
4. Ballaison
5. Bons-en-Chablais
6. Brenthonne
7. Cervens
8. Chens-sur-Léman
9. Douvaine
10. Draillant
11. Excenevex
12. Fessy
13. Loisin
14. Lully
15. Lyaud
16. Margencel
17. Massongy
18. Messery
19. Nernier
20. Orcier
21. Perrignier
22. Sciez
23. Thonon-les-Bains
24. Veigy-Foncenex
25. Yvoire
