= Brenthonne =

Brenthonne Brintene (Savoyard)
- Commune
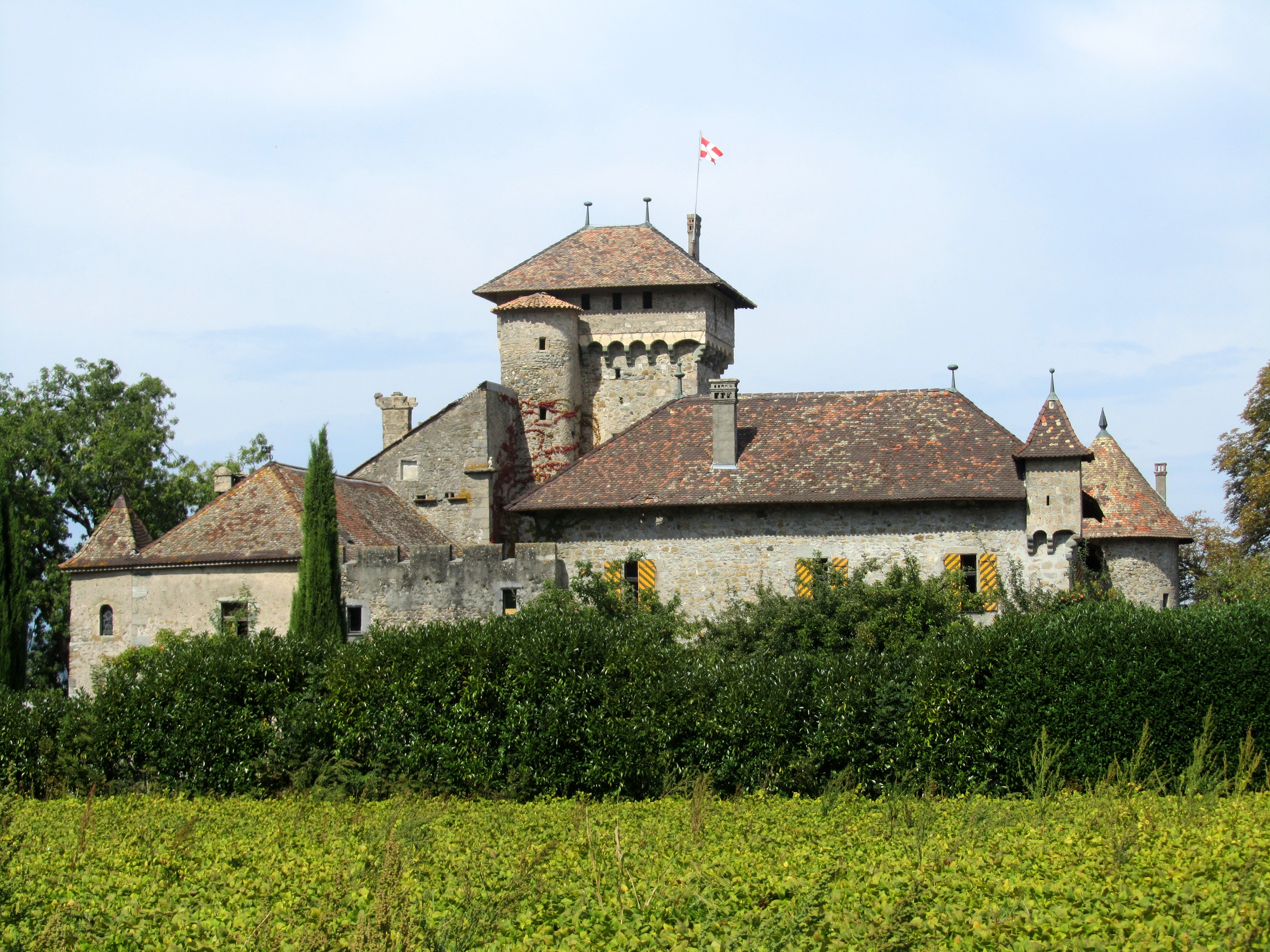
- The Château of Avully

- Coat of arms
- Location of Brenthonne
- Location within France Location within Auvergne-Rhône-Alpes
- Coordinates: 46°16′28″N 6°23′40″E
- Country: France
- Region: Auvergne-Rhône-Alpes
- Department: Haute-Savoie
- Arrondissement: Thonon-les-Bains
- Canton: Sciez
- Intercommunality: Thonon Agglomération

Government
  - Mayor (2020–2026): Michel Burgnard
- Area^{1}: 8.38 km^{2} (3.24 sq mi)
- Highest elevation: 1,004 m (3,294 ft)
- Lowest elevation: 479 m (1,572 ft)
- Population (2023): 1,128
  - Density: 135/km^{2} (349/sq mi)
- Time zone: UTC+01:00 (CET)
  - Summer (DST): UTC+02:00 (CEST)
- INSEE/Postal code: 74048 /74890
- ^{1} French Land Register data, which excludes lakes, ponds, glaciers > 1 km^{2} (0.386 sq mi or 247 acres) and river estuaries.

Brenthonne (Savoyard: Brintene) is a commune in the Haute-Savoie department in the Auvergne-Rhône-Alpes region in south-eastern France.

== See also ==
- Communes of the Haute-Savoie department
