= Anthy-sur-Léman =

Anthy-sur-Léman Anti (Savoyard)
- Commune
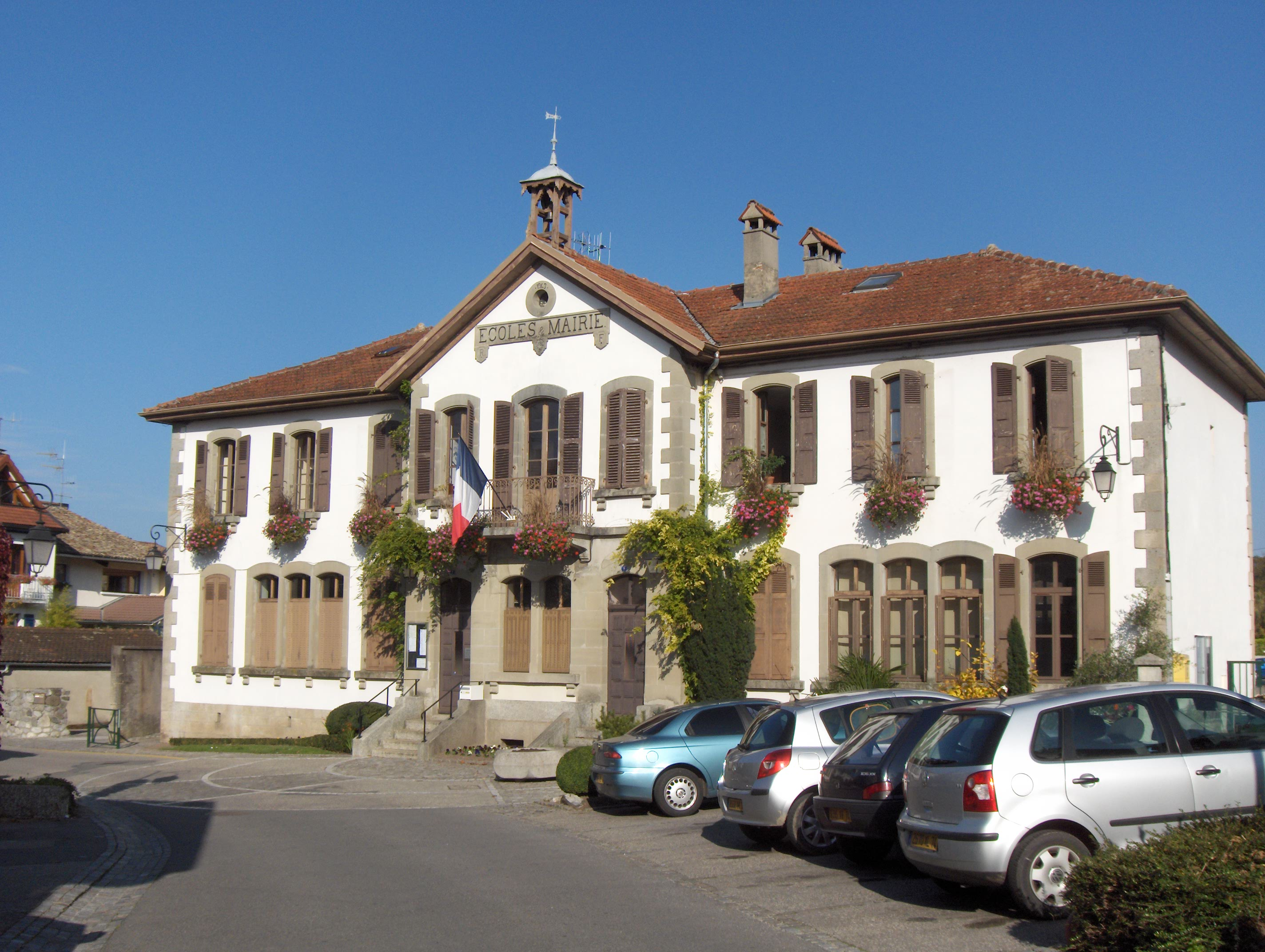
- The town hall in Anthy-sur-Léman

- Coat of arms
- Location of Anthy-sur-Léman
- Location within France Location within Auvergne-Rhône-Alpes
- Coordinates: 46°21′21″N 6°25′39″E
- Country: France
- Region: Auvergne-Rhône-Alpes
- Department: Haute-Savoie
- Arrondissement: Thonon-les-Bains
- Canton: Sciez
- Intercommunality: Thonon Agglomération

Government
  - Mayor (2020–2026): Isabelle Asni-Duchêne
- Area^{1}: 4.62 km^{2} (1.78 sq mi)
- Highest elevation: 470 m (1,540 ft)
- Lowest elevation: 372 m (1,220 ft)
- Population (2023): 2,495
  - Density: 540/km^{2} (1,400/sq mi)
- Demonym: Anthychois / Anthychoise
- Time zone: UTC+01:00 (CET)
  - Summer (DST): UTC+02:00 (CEST)
- INSEE/Postal code: 74013 /74200
- ^{1} French Land Register data, which excludes lakes, ponds, glaciers > 1 km^{2} (0.386 sq mi or 247 acres) and river estuaries.

Anthy-sur-Léman (French pronunciation: [ɑ̃ti syʁ lemɑ̃], literally Anthy on Léman; Savoyard: Anti) is a commune in the Haute-Savoie department in the Auvergne-Rhône-Alpes region in south-eastern France.

== Population ==
Historical population
Year	Pop.	±% p.a.
1968	579	—
1975	896	+6.44%
1982	1,121	+3.25%
1990	1,383	+2.66%
1999	1,767	+2.76%
2007	1,900	+0.91%
2012	2,012	+1.15%
2017	2,171	+1.53%
2023	2,495	+2.35%
Source: INSEE

== See also ==
- Communes of the Haute-Savoie department
