= Perrignier =

- Commune
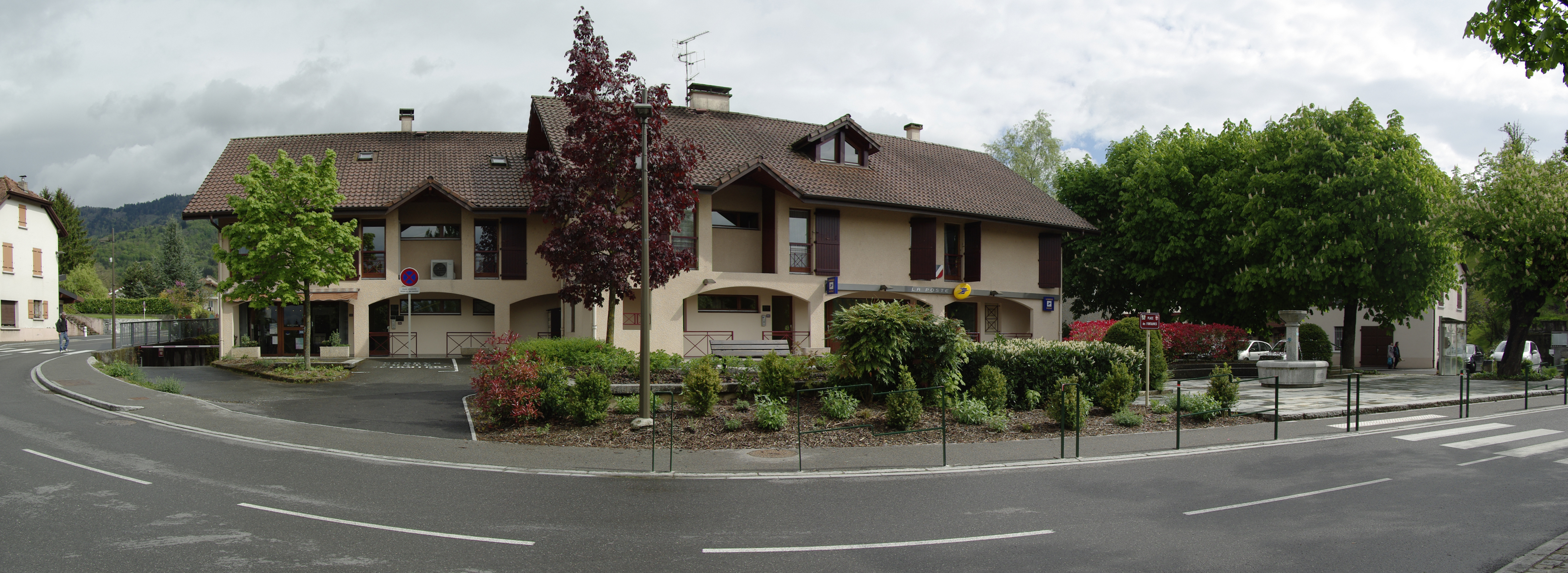
- The centre of Perrignier

- Coat of arms
- Location of Perrignier
- Location within France Location within Auvergne-Rhône-Alpes
- Coordinates: 46°18′18″N 6°26′27″E
- Country: France
- Region: Auvergne-Rhône-Alpes
- Department: Haute-Savoie
- Arrondissement: Thonon-les-Bains
- Canton: Thonon-les-Bains
- Intercommunality: Thonon Agglomération

Government
  - Mayor (2020–2026): Claude Manillier
- Area^{1}: 18.26 km^{2} (7.05 sq mi)
- Highest elevation: 729 m (2,392 ft)
- Lowest elevation: 489 m (1,604 ft)
- Population (2023): 1,905
  - Density: 104.3/km^{2} (270.2/sq mi)
- Time zone: UTC+01:00 (CET)
  - Summer (DST): UTC+02:00 (CEST)
- INSEE/Postal code: 74210 /74550
- ^{1} French Land Register data, which excludes lakes, ponds, glaciers > 1 km^{2} (0.386 sq mi or 247 acres) and river estuaries.

Perrignier (French pronunciation: [peʁiɲe]) is a commune in the Haute-Savoie department in the Auvergne-Rhône-Alpes region in south-eastern France.

== See also ==
- Communes of the Haute-Savoie department
