= Ballaison =

Ballaison Balêson (Savoyard)
- Commune
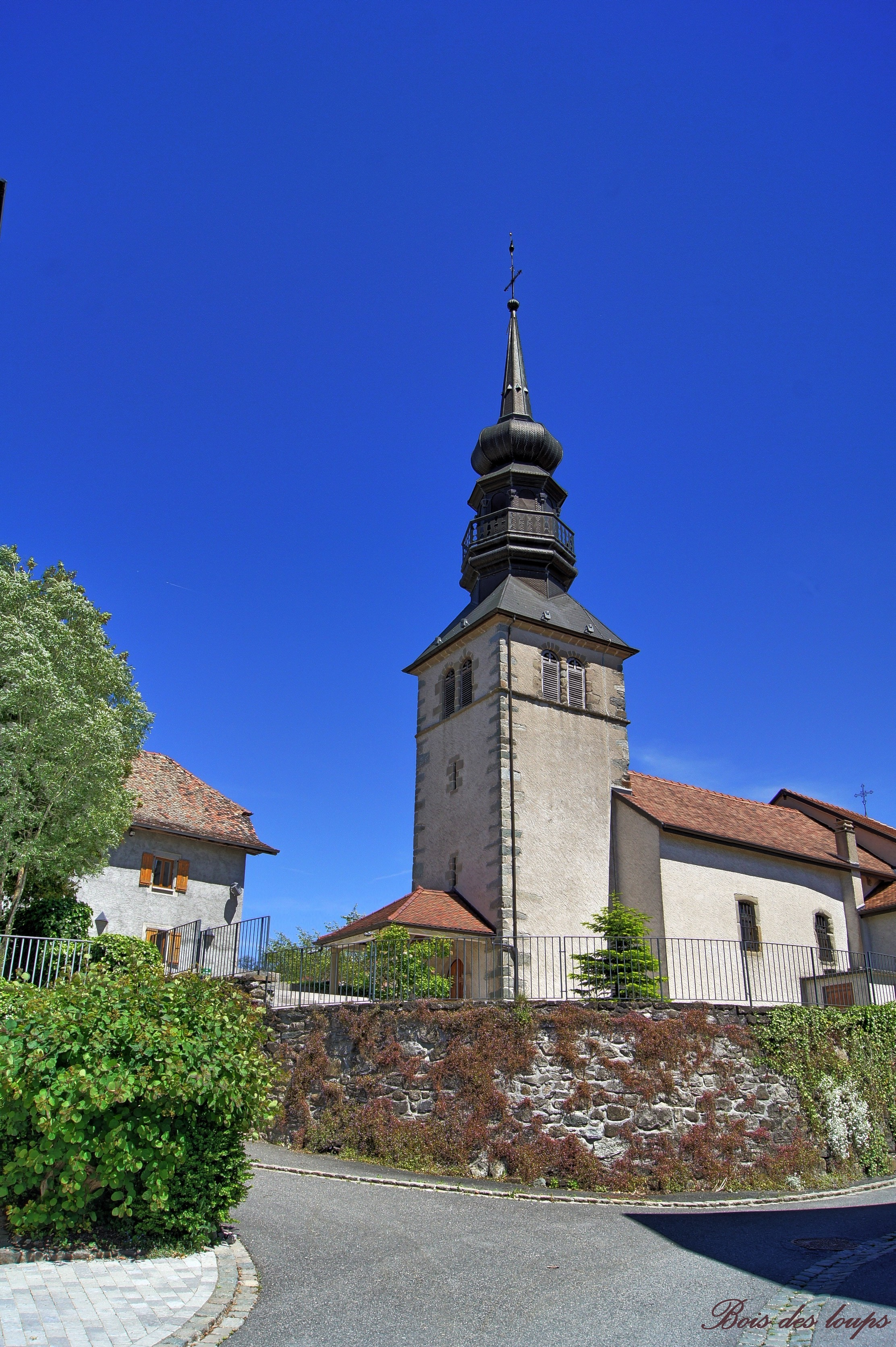
- The church of Saint-Etienne, in Ballaison

- Coat of arms
- Location of Ballaison
- Location within France Location within Auvergne-Rhône-Alpes
- Coordinates: 46°17′59″N 6°19′47″E
- Country: France
- Region: Auvergne-Rhône-Alpes
- Department: Haute-Savoie
- Arrondissement: Thonon-les-Bains
- Canton: Sciez
- Intercommunality: Thonon Agglomération

Government
  - Mayor (2020–2026): Christophe Songeon
- Area^{1}: 13.30 km^{2} (5.14 sq mi)
- Highest elevation: 734 m (2,408 ft)
- Lowest elevation: 473 m (1,552 ft)
- Population (2023): 1,472
  - Density: 110.7/km^{2} (286.7/sq mi)
- Time zone: UTC+01:00 (CET)
  - Summer (DST): UTC+02:00 (CEST)
- INSEE/Postal code: 74025 /74140
- ^{1} French Land Register data, which excludes lakes, ponds, glaciers > 1 km^{2} (0.386 sq mi or 247 acres) and river estuaries.

Ballaison (French pronunciation: [balɛzɔ̃]; Savoyard: Balêson) is a commune in the Haute-Savoie department in the Auvergne-Rhône-Alpes region in south-eastern France.

== See also ==
- Communes of the Haute-Savoie department
