= Chens-sur-Léman =

Chens-sur-Léman Shan (Savoyard)
- Commune
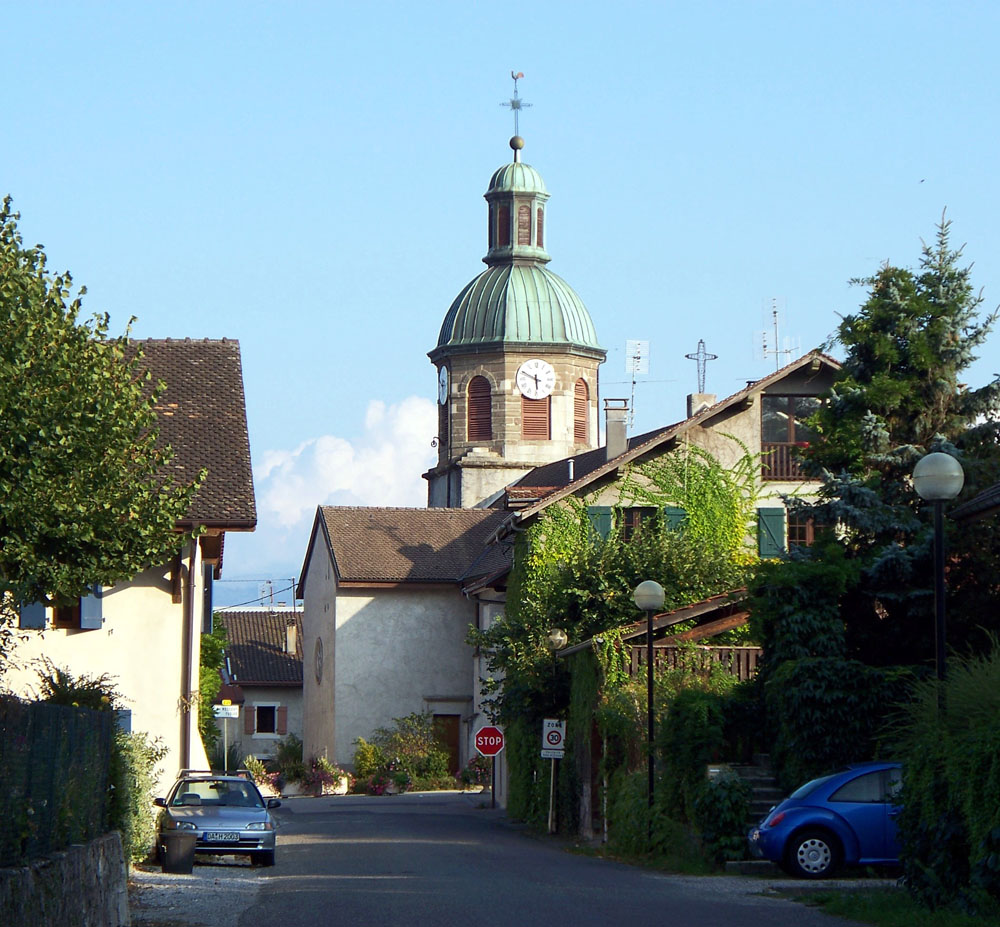
- The church in Chens-sur-Léman

- Coat of arms
- Location of Chens-sur-Léman
- Location within France Location within Auvergne-Rhône-Alpes
- Coordinates: 46°19′44″N 6°16′09″E
- Country: France
- Region: Auvergne-Rhône-Alpes
- Department: Haute-Savoie
- Arrondissement: Thonon-les-Bains
- Canton: Sciez
- Intercommunality: Thonon Agglomération

Government
  - Mayor (2020–2026): Pascale Moriaud
- Area^{1}: 10.87 km^{2} (4.20 sq mi)
- Highest elevation: 439 m (1,440 ft)
- Lowest elevation: 372 m (1,220 ft)
- Population (2023): 3,068
  - Density: 282.2/km^{2} (731.0/sq mi)
- Time zone: UTC+01:00 (CET)
  - Summer (DST): UTC+02:00 (CEST)
- INSEE/Postal code: 74070 /74140
- ^{1} French Land Register data, which excludes lakes, ponds, glaciers > 1 km^{2} (0.386 sq mi or 247 acres) and river estuaries.

Chens-sur-Léman (Savoyard: Shan) is a commune in the Haute-Savoie department in the Auvergne-Rhône-Alpes region in south-eastern France. It lies on Lake Geneva (French: Léman) and on the border of Switzerland, northeast of Geneva.

== Population ==
Historical population
Year	Pop.	±% p.a.
1968	636	—
1975	835	+3.97%
1982	856	+0.36%
1990	1,063	+2.74%
1999	1,274	+2.03%
2007	1,708	+3.73%
2012	2,050	+3.72%
2017	2,776	+6.25%
2023	3,068	+1.68%
Source: INSEE

== World Heritage Site ==
It is home to one or more prehistoric pile-dwelling (or stilt house) settlements that are part of the Prehistoric Pile dwellings around the Alps UNESCO World Heritage Site.

== See also ==
- Communes of the Haute-Savoie department
