= Veigy-Foncenex =

Veigy-Foncenex Vêzhi-Fonsné (Arpitan)
- Commune
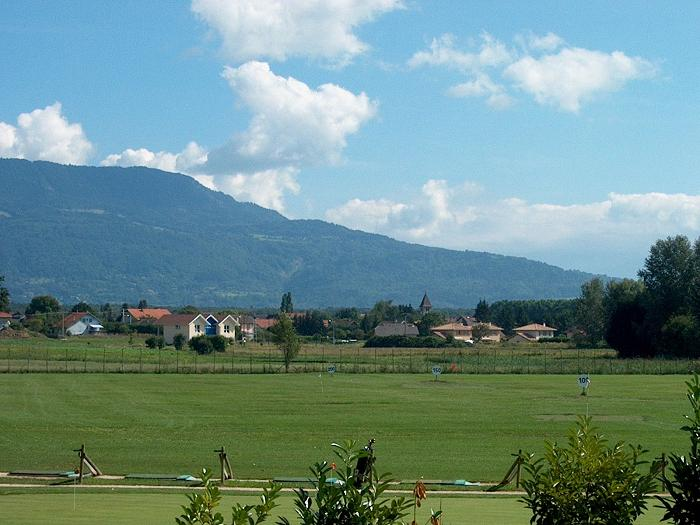
- A general view of Veigy-Foncenex

- Coat of arms
- Location of Veigy-Foncenex
- Location within France Location within Auvergne-Rhône-Alpes
- Coordinates: 46°16′N 6°15′E
- Country: France
- Region: Auvergne-Rhône-Alpes
- Department: Haute-Savoie
- Arrondissement: Thonon-les-Bains
- Canton: Sciez
- Intercommunality: Thonon Agglomération

Government
  - Mayor (2020–2026): Catherine Bastard
- Area^{1}: 13 km^{2} (5.0 sq mi)
- Highest elevation: 460 m (1,510 ft)
- Lowest elevation: 350 m (1,150 ft)
- Population (2023): 4,141
  - Density: 320/km^{2} (830/sq mi)
- Time zone: UTC+01:00 (CET)
  - Summer (DST): UTC+02:00 (CEST)
- INSEE/Postal code: 74293 /74140
- ^{1} French Land Register data, which excludes lakes, ponds, glaciers > 1 km^{2} (0.386 sq mi or 247 acres) and river estuaries.

Veigy-Foncenex (French pronunciation: [veʒi fɔ̃snɛ]; Arpitan: Vêzhi-Fonsné) is a commune in the Haute-Savoie department in the Auvergne-Rhône-Alpes region in south-eastern France.

== Population ==
Historical population
Year	Pop.	±% p.a.
1968	847	—
1975	1,396	+7.40%
1982	1,935	+4.77%
1990	2,405	+2.76%
1999	2,502	+0.44%
2007	3,151	+2.92%
2012	3,558	+2.46%
2017	3,685	+0.70%
2023	4,141	+1.96%
Source: INSEE

== See also ==
- Communes of the Haute-Savoie department
