= Messery =

- Commune
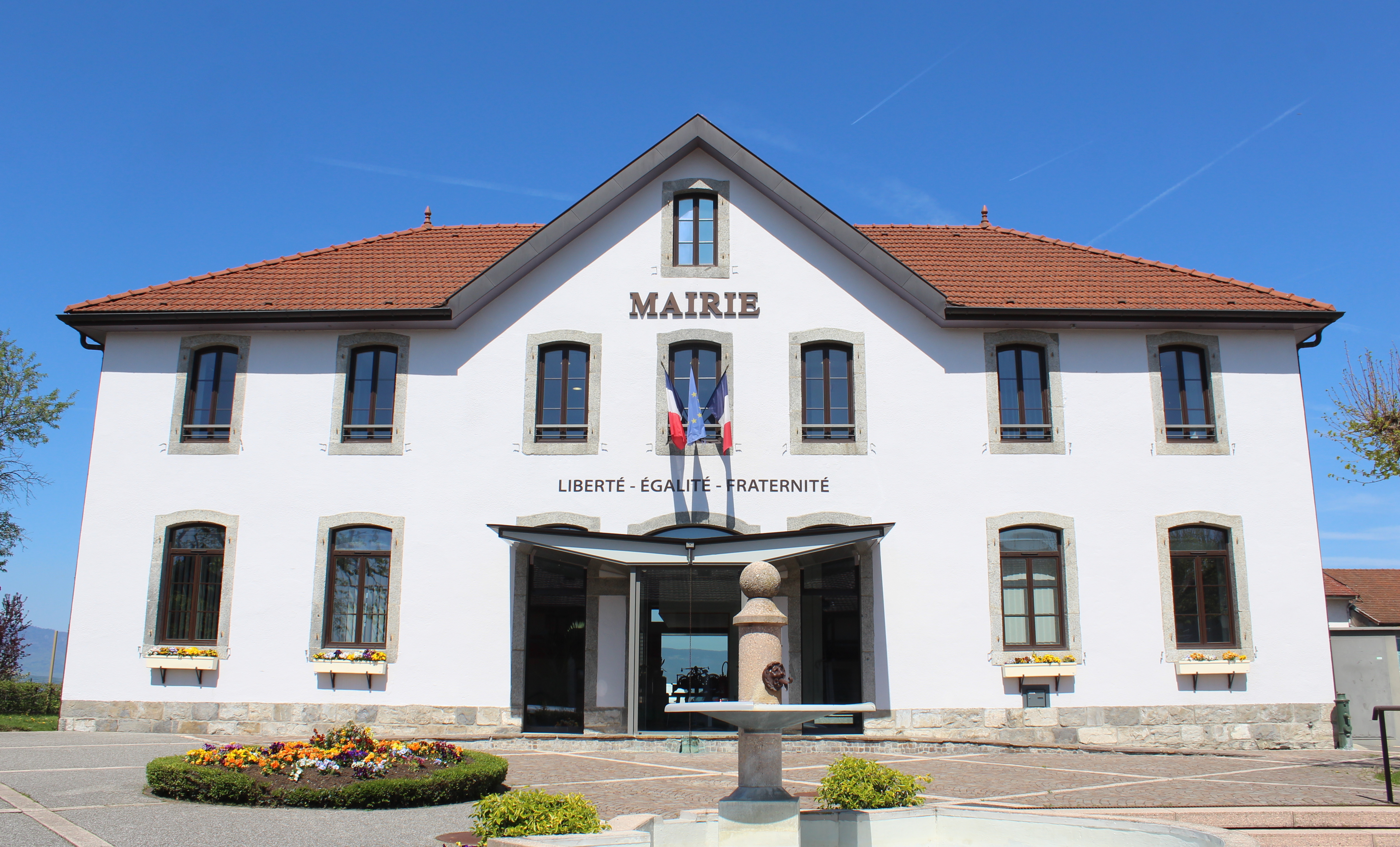
- Town hall

- Coat of arms
- Location of Messery
- Location within France Location within Auvergne-Rhône-Alpes
- Coordinates: 46°21′02″N 6°17′37″E
- Country: France
- Region: Auvergne-Rhône-Alpes
- Department: Haute-Savoie
- Arrondissement: Thonon-les-Bains
- Canton: Sciez
- Intercommunality: Thonon Agglomération

Government
  - Mayor (2020–2026): Serge Bel
- Area^{1}: 9.2 km^{2} (3.6 sq mi)
- Population (2023): 2,474
  - Density: 270/km^{2} (700/sq mi)
- Time zone: UTC+01:00 (CET)
  - Summer (DST): UTC+02:00 (CEST)
- INSEE/Postal code: 74180 /74140
- ^{1} French Land Register data, which excludes lakes, ponds, glaciers > 1 km^{2} (0.386 sq mi or 247 acres) and river estuaries.

Messery is a commune in the Haute-Savoie department in the Auvergne-Rhône-Alpes region in south-eastern France.

== Population ==
Historical population
Year	Pop.	±% p.a.
1968	393	—
1975	580	+5.72%
1982	844	+5.51%
1990	1,145	+3.89%
1999	1,434	+2.53%
2007	2,025	+4.41%
2012	2,135	+1.06%
2017	2,134	−0.01%
2023	2,474	+2.49%
Source: INSEE

== See also ==
- Communes of the Haute-Savoie department
