= Massongy =

- Commune
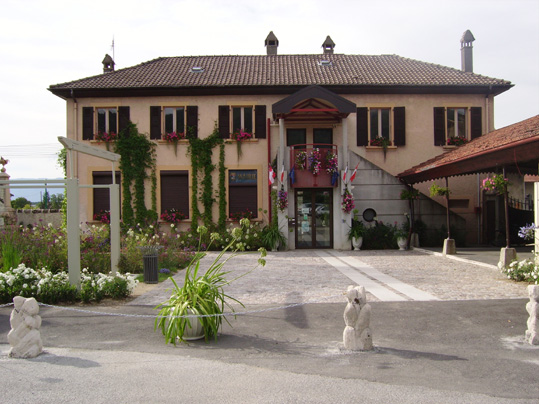
- The town hall in Massongy

- Coat of arms
- Location of Massongy
- Location within France Location within Auvergne-Rhône-Alpes
- Coordinates: 46°18′58″N 6°20′01″E
- Country: France
- Region: Auvergne-Rhône-Alpes
- Department: Haute-Savoie
- Arrondissement: Thonon-les-Bains
- Canton: Sciez
- Intercommunality: Thonon Agglomération

Government
  - Mayor (2020–2026): Sandrine Deturche
- Area^{1}: 9 km^{2} (3.5 sq mi)
- Highest elevation: 490 m (1,610 ft)
- Lowest elevation: 415 m (1,362 ft)
- Population (2023): 1,770
  - Density: 200/km^{2} (510/sq mi)
- Time zone: UTC+01:00 (CET)
  - Summer (DST): UTC+02:00 (CEST)
- INSEE/Postal code: 74171 /74140
- Website: Massongy.fr
- ^{1} French Land Register data, which excludes lakes, ponds, glaciers > 1 km^{2} (0.386 sq mi or 247 acres) and river estuaries.

Massongy (French pronunciation: [masɔ̃ʒi]) is a commune in the Haute-Savoie department in the Auvergne-Rhône-Alpes region in south-eastern France.

== See also ==
- Communes of the Haute-Savoie department
