= Excenevex =

Excenevex Éshenevé (Arpitan)
- Commune
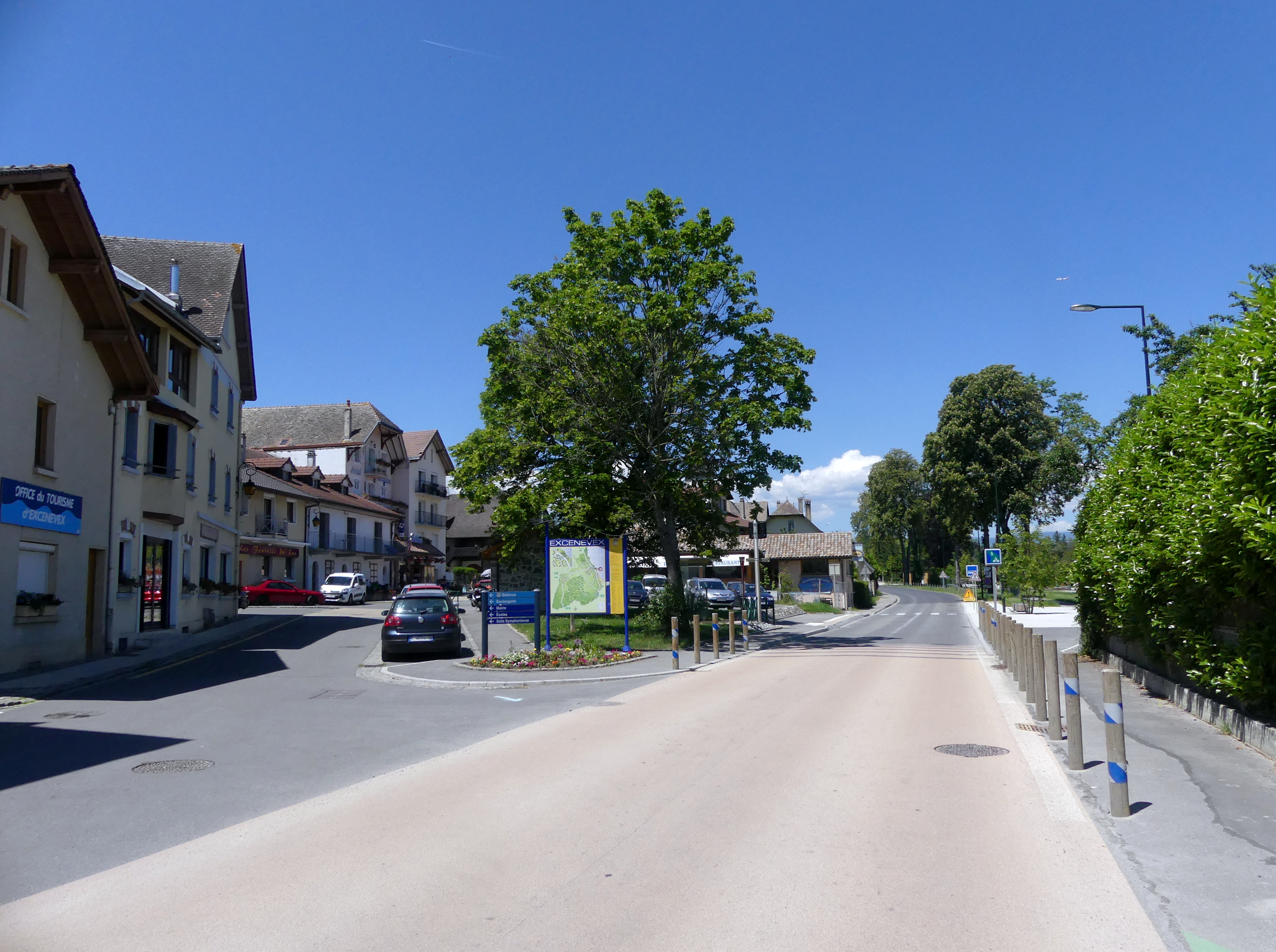

- Coat of arms
- Location of Excenevex
- Location within France Location within Auvergne-Rhône-Alpes
- Coordinates: 46°21′N 6°21′E
- Country: France
- Region: Auvergne-Rhône-Alpes
- Department: Haute-Savoie
- Arrondissement: Thonon-les-Bains
- Canton: Sciez
- Intercommunality: Thonon Agglomération

Government
  - Mayor (2020–2026): Chrystelle Beurrier
- Area^{1}: 6.6641 km^{2} (2.5730 sq mi)
- Highest elevation: 1 m (3.3 ft)
- Lowest elevation: 1 m (3.3 ft)
- Population (2023): 1,327
  - Density: 199.1/km^{2} (515.7/sq mi)
- Time zone: UTC+01:00 (CET)
  - Summer (DST): UTC+02:00 (CEST)
- INSEE/Postal code: 74121 /74140
- Website: mairie.excenevex.fr
- ^{1} French Land Register data, which excludes lakes, ponds, glaciers > 1 km^{2} (0.386 sq mi or 247 acres) and river estuaries.

Excenevex (French pronunciation: [ɛksɛnvɛ]; Arpitan: Éshenevé) is a commune in the Haute-Savoie department in the Auvergne-Rhône-Alpes region in south-eastern France.

== Toponymy ==
As with many polysyllabic Arpitan toponyms or anthroponyms, the final -x marks oxytonic stress (on the last syllable), whereas the final -z indicates paroxytonic stress (on the penultimate syllable) and should not be pronounced, although in French it is often mispronounced due to hypercorrection.

== See also ==
- Communes of the Haute-Savoie department
