= Yvoire =

- Commune
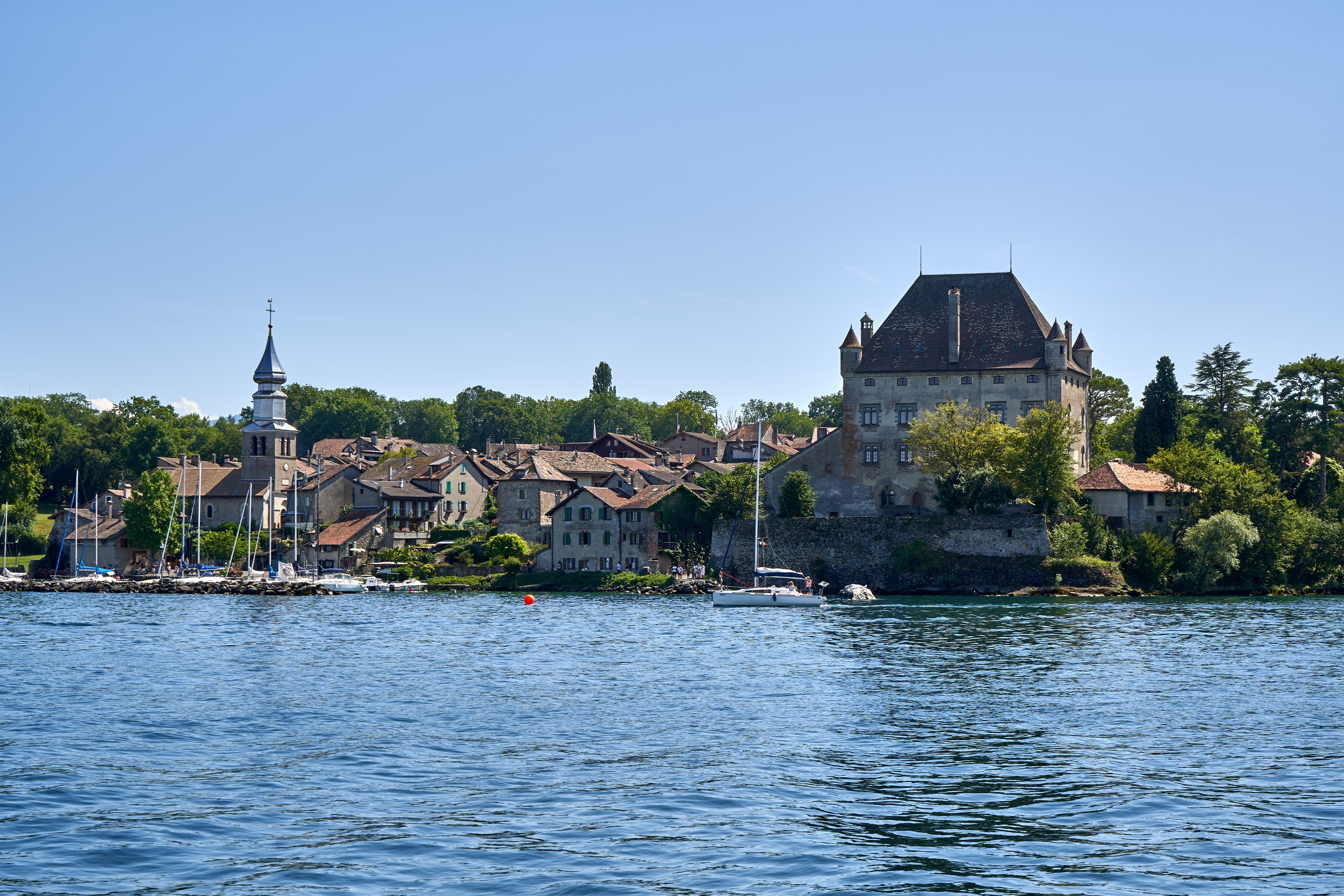
- Yvoire as seen from Lake Geneva

- Flag Coat of arms
- Location of Yvoire
- Location within France Location within Auvergne-Rhône-Alpes
- Coordinates: 46°22′13″N 6°19′34″E
- Country: France
- Region: Auvergne-Rhône-Alpes
- Department: Haute-Savoie
- Arrondissement: Thonon-les-Bains
- Canton: Sciez
- Intercommunality: Thonon Agglomération

Government
  - Mayor (2020–2026): Jean-François Kung
- Area^{1}: 3.12 km^{2} (1.20 sq mi)
- Highest elevation: 441 m (1,447 ft)
- Lowest elevation: 372 m (1,220 ft)
- Population (2023): 1,046
  - Density: 335/km^{2} (868/sq mi)
- Demonym(s): Yvoiriens, Yvoiriennes
- Time zone: UTC+01:00 (CET)
  - Summer (DST): UTC+02:00 (CEST)
- INSEE/Postal code: 74315 /74140
- ^{1} French Land Register data, which excludes lakes, ponds, glaciers > 1 km^{2} (0.386 sq mi or 247 acres) and river estuaries.

Yvoire (French pronunciation: [ivwaʁ]) is a medieval town in France, in the department of Haute-Savoie, within the region of Auvergne-Rhône-Alpes. On the French side of Lake Geneva, it is roughly 26 kilometres (16 miles) northeast, by road, of Geneva, Switzerland.

== Geography ==
Located at the northern tip of the Leman peninsula (presqu'île de Léman), Yvoire delimits the two main parts of Lake Geneva, the "petit lac" and the "grand lac".

== History ==
During the period of the Holy Roman Empire, the town was within the County of Savoy, a feudal state of the empire (elevated during the 15th century to the Duchy of Savoy, an Imperial Estate). In the 14th century, Count Amadeus V fortified the town, adding Château d'Yvoire and associated ramparts. It soon gained strategic military importance and the inhabitants were given tax privileges.

== Features ==
The town is known for its medieval buildings and summer floral displays, as well as the Jardin des Cinq Sens, a garden in the center of the town. It is a member of Les Plus Beaux Villages de France (The Most Beautiful Villages of France) Association.

== Population ==
Historical population
Year	Pop.	±% p.a.
1968	305	—
1975	335	+1.35%
1982	357	+0.91%
1990	432	+2.41%
1999	639	+4.45%
2007	811	+3.02%
2012	884	+1.74%
2017	993	+2.35%
2023	1,046	+0.87%
Source: INSEE

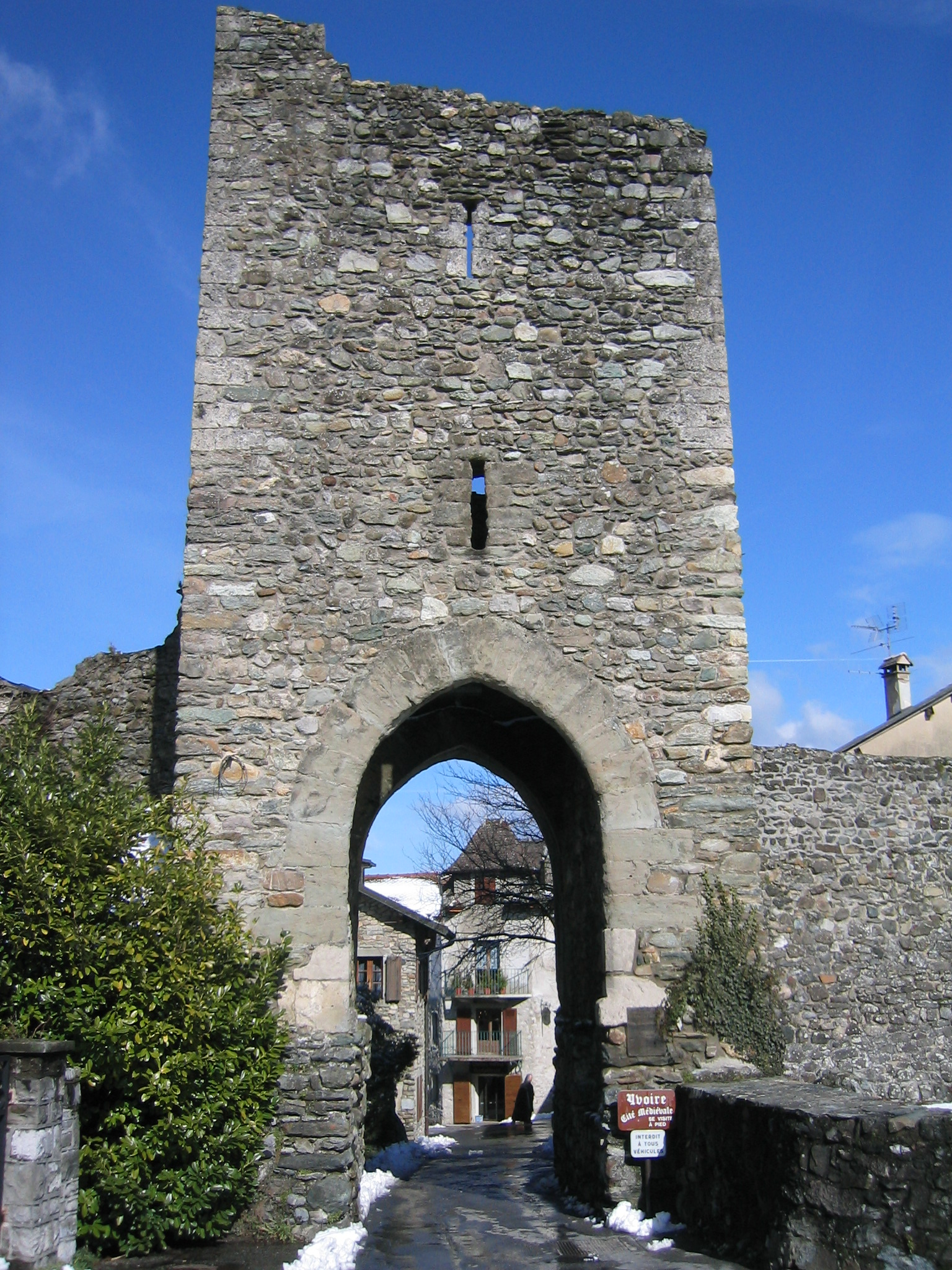
The medieval gate

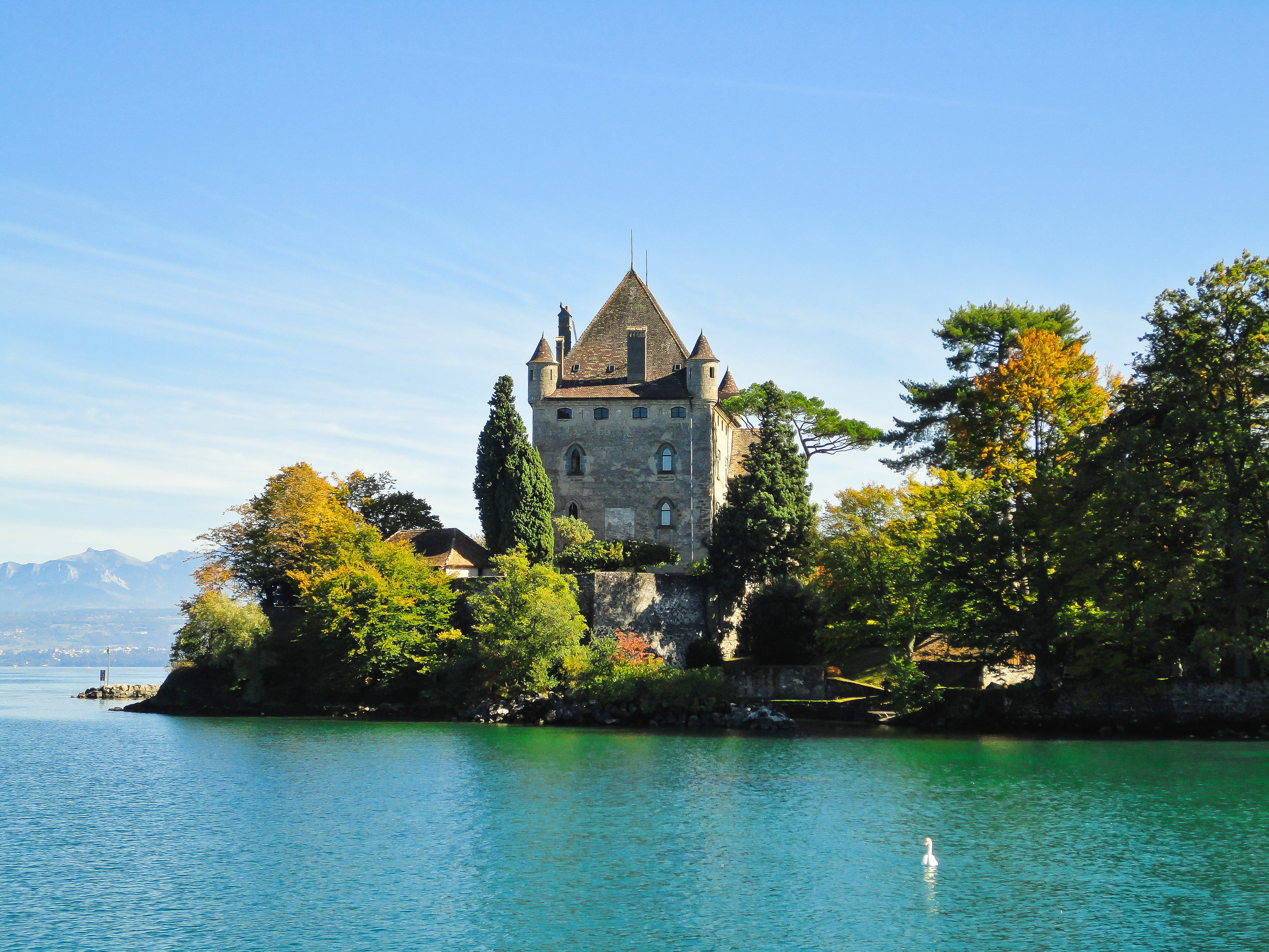
Château d'Yvoire on Lake Geneva

== See also ==
- Communes of the Haute-Savoie department
