= Douvaine =

- Commune
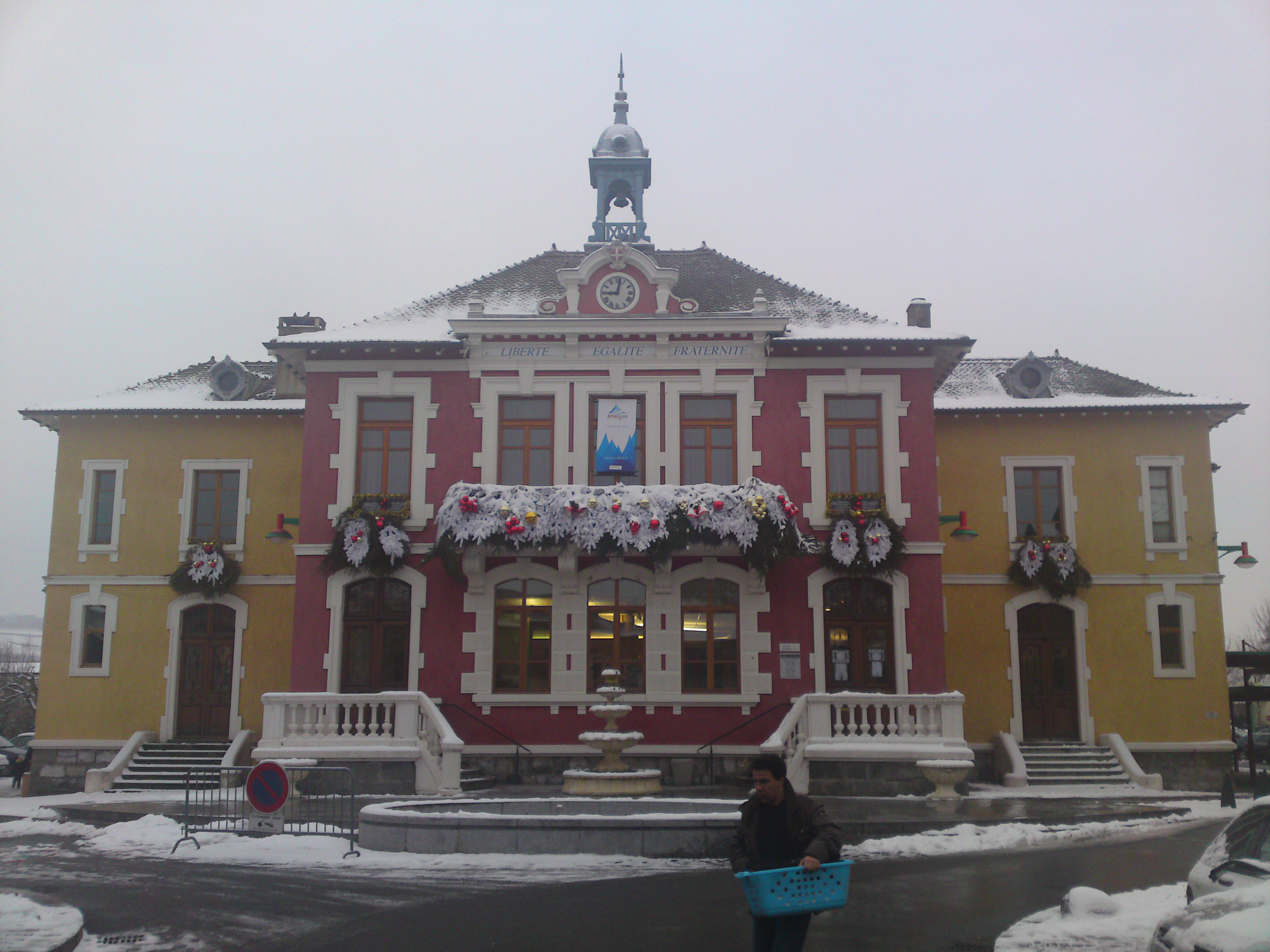
- The town hall in Douvaine

- Coat of arms
- Location of Douvaine
- Location within France Location within Auvergne-Rhône-Alpes
- Coordinates: 46°18′21″N 6°18′16″E
- Country: France
- Region: Auvergne-Rhône-Alpes
- Department: Haute-Savoie
- Arrondissement: Thonon-les-Bains
- Canton: Sciez
- Intercommunality: Thonon Agglomération

Government
  - Mayor (2020–2026): Claire Chuinard
- Area^{1}: 10.55 km^{2} (4.07 sq mi)
- Highest elevation: 520 m (1,710 ft)
- Lowest elevation: 421 m (1,381 ft)
- Population (2023): 6,796
  - Density: 644.2/km^{2} (1,668/sq mi)
- Time zone: UTC+01:00 (CET)
  - Summer (DST): UTC+02:00 (CEST)
- INSEE/Postal code: 74105 /74140
- Website: douvaine.fr
- ^{1} French Land Register data, which excludes lakes, ponds, glaciers > 1 km^{2} (0.386 sq mi or 247 acres) and river estuaries.

Douvaine (French pronunciation: [duvɛn]) is a commune in the Haute-Savoie department in the Auvergne-Rhône-Alpes region in south-eastern France.

== Location ==
Located on the old Roman way, now the National Road 5, Douvaine is part of the Canton of Sciez that includes 25 communes located in the Bas-Chablais area.

== Population ==
Historical population
| Year | Pop. | ±% p.a. |
|---|---|---|
| 1968 | 1,440 | — |
| 1975 | 2,202 | +6.26% |
| 1982 | 2,724 | +3.09% |
| 1990 | 3,354 | +2.63% |
| 1999 | 3,859 | +1.57% |
| 2007 | 4,500 | +1.94% |
| 2012 | 5,253 | +3.14% |
| 2017 | 5,948 | +2.52% |
| 2023 | 6,796 | +2.25% |
Source: INSEE

== See also ==
- Communes of the Haute-Savoie department
