= A41 autoroute =

Road in France

A41 autoroute
- LIANE (A40 - Saint-Martin-Bellevue Toll); L'Alpine (rest of the A41)

Route information
- Part of E21 / E62 / E70 / E712
- Maintained by ATMB, ADELAC and AREA
- Length: 112.9 km (70.2 mi)
- Existed: 1975–present

Major junctions
- North end: E21 / E62 / A 1 in Saint-Julien-en-Genevois, (near Geneva)
- E21 / E25 / E62 / A 40 in Saint-Julien-en-Genevois E712 / A 410 in Villy-le-Pelloux E70 / A 43 in La Motte-Servolex and Francin

- South end: N 90 / D 1090 in Meylan (near Grenoble)

Location
- Country: France

Highway system
- Roads in France; Autoroutes; Routes nationales

The A41 autoroute, also known as l'autoroute alpine, is a French motorway. The road passes through the French Alps connecting the city of Grenoble with the A40 near Geneva. It is made of two sections separated by the N201 and A43 autoroute at Chambéry.

== Characteristics ==
The A41 motorway is made up of two sections:

- the A41 North: 71 km long; mainly 2x2 lanes with a 3rd lane for slow moving vehicles on steep climbs.
- the A41 South: 41 km long; mainly 2x2 lanes, 2x3 lanes near Grenoble;

== History ==
- 1975 : Opened the section between Annecy and Rumilly
- 1977 : Opened the section between Chambéry and Annecy
- 1978 : Opened the section between Grenoble and Chambéry
- 1981 : Junction with the A40 autoroute.
- 2008 : Opened the 19 km section between Saint-Julien-en-Genevois and Villy-le-Pelloux including Mont-Sion tunnel (3,100 m).

== Lists of exits and junctions ==
=== A41 North ===
Region	Department	Junction	Destinations	Notes
French - Swiss Border ; E21 / E62 / A 1 becomes E21 / E62 / A 41
Auvergne-Rhône-Alpes	Haute-Savoie	A40 - A41	Paris, Lyon, Mâcon, Annecy, Saint-Julien-en-Genevois, Turin - Milan by the (Mont Blanc Tunnel), Chamonix, Annemasse, Genève - Vallard	
Auvergne-Rhône-Alpes	Haute-Savoie	E25 / E62 / A 41 becomes A 41		
Auvergne-Rhône-Alpes	Haute-Savoie	19 : Copponex	Copponex, Cruseilles	
Auvergne-Rhône-Alpes	Haute-Savoie	Aire des Ponts de la Caille (Southbound); Aire de la Ravoire (Northbound)		
Auvergne-Rhône-Alpes	Haute-Savoie	18 : Cruseilles	Cruseilles, Allonzier-la-Caille	
Auvergne-Rhône-Alpes	Haute-Savoie	A410 - A41	Annemasse, La Roche-sur-Foron, Thonon-les-Bains, Évian-les-Bains, Milan, Chamonix (A40)`	
Auvergne-Rhône-Alpes	Haute-Savoie	Péage de Saint-Martin-Bellevue		
Auvergne-Rhône-Alpes	Haute-Savoie	A 41 becomes E712 / A 41		
Auvergne-Rhône-Alpes	Haute-Savoie	17 : Annecy - nord	Annecy, Pringy, Annecy-le-Vieux, Thônes, Massif des Aravis	
Auvergne-Rhône-Alpes	Haute-Savoie	16 : Annecy - centre	Annecy, Albertville, Cran-Gevrier, Seynod - centre	
Auvergne-Rhône-Alpes	Haute-Savoie	Aire des Fontanelles (Southbound); Aire de La Ripaille (Northbound)		
Auvergne-Rhône-Alpes	Haute-Savoie	15.1 : Seynod - sud	Seynod, Quintal, Vieugy, Chapeiry, Montagny-les-Lanches	
Auvergne-Rhône-Alpes	Haute-Savoie	15 : Rumilly	Alby-sur-Chéran, Rumilly	
Auvergne-Rhône-Alpes	Savoie	Aire d'Albens (Southbound); Aire de Saint-Girod (Northbound)		
Auvergne-Rhône-Alpes	Savoie	14 : Aix-les-Bains - nord	Aix-les-Bains, Mont Revard	
Auvergne-Rhône-Alpes	Savoie	Aire de Drumettaz (Southbound); Aire de Mouxy (Northbound)		
Auvergne-Rhône-Alpes	Savoie	13 : Aix-les-Bains - sud	Aix-les-Bains, Lac du Bourget	
Auvergne-Rhône-Alpes	Savoie	A43/A41 - A41 & A43	Bourg-en-Bresse, Annecy, Aix-les-Bains, Lyon, Le Bourget-du-Lac, Savoie Technolac, Chambéry - Savoie, Chambéry, La Motte-Servolex	
Auvergne-Rhône-Alpes	Savoie	A43/A41 - A41 & A43	Lyon, Valence, Marseille, Bourg-en-Bresse	
E70 / E712 / A 43 / A 41 becomes E70 / E712 / N 201
1.000 mi = 1.609 km; 1.000 km = 0.621 mi

=== A41 South ===
Region	Department	Junction	Destinations	Notes
Auvergne-Rhône-Alpes	Savoie	A43/A41 & A43 - A41	Geneve, Annecy, Chambéry	
Auvergne-Rhône-Alpes	Savoie	A43/A41 & A43 - A41	Turin - Milan by (Fréjus Road Tunnel), Albertville (A430), Saint-Jean-de-Maurienne, Montmélian	
Auvergne-Rhône-Alpes	Isère	Aire de Chapareillan (Southbound); Aire des Marches (Northbound)		
Auvergne-Rhône-Alpes	Isère	22 : Pontcharra	Pontcharra, La Rochette	
Auvergne-Rhône-Alpes	Isère	23 : Le Touvet	Le Touvet, Allevard	
Auvergne-Rhône-Alpes	Isère	Aire de La Terrasse (Southbound); Aire de Chonas (Northbound)		
Auvergne-Rhône-Alpes	Isère	24/24a/24b : Crolles	Crolles, Froges, Villard-Bonnot, Brignoud, Chambéry	
Auvergne-Rhône-Alpes	Isère	Péage de Crolles		
Auvergne-Rhône-Alpes	Isère	24c : Bernin	Bernin	
Auvergne-Rhône-Alpes	Isère	Aire du Bois-Claret (southbound) (Southbound); Aire de Saint Nazaire-les-Eymes (Northbound)		
Auvergne-Rhône-Alpes	Isère	24.1 : Saint-Ismier	Saint-Ismier - Z. A, Villard-Bonnot	
Auvergne-Rhône-Alpes	Isère	25 : Montbonnot	Domène, Montbonnot-Saint-Martin, Saint-Ismier - centre	
Auvergne-Rhône-Alpes	Isère	26 : Meylan - est	Meylan	
Auvergne-Rhône-Alpes	Isère	RN 87 - A41	Sisteron, Gap, Briançon (A51), Lyon (A48), Valence (A49), Gières, Domaine Universitaire, Saint-Martin-d'Hères, A480	
Auvergne-Rhône-Alpes	Isère	E712 / A 41 becomes A 41		
Auvergne-Rhône-Alpes	Isère	Meylan - centre	Meylan	
Auvergne-Rhône-Alpes	Isère	27 : Meylan - Mi-Plaine	Meylan, La Tronche - centre, Corenc	
End of the A 41 and enters in the city of Grenoble
1.000 mi = 1.609 km; 1.000 km = 0.621 mi
