= A43 autoroute =

Motorway from Lyon to the French Alps

A43 autoroute
- Autoroute alpine Autoroute de la Maurienne

Route information
- Part of E70 / E711 / E712
- Maintained by AREA/SFTRF
- Length: 208 km (129 mi)
- Existed: 1972–present

Major junctions
- West end: Boulevard périphérique de Lyon in Lyon
- E15 / A 46 / N 346 in Saint-Priest; E70 / A 432 in Saint-Laurent-de-Mure; E711 / A 48 in Cessieu; E712 / A 41 in La Motte-Servolex and Porte-de-Savoie; A 430 in Aiton

- East end: E70 / N 543 in Tunnel du Fréjus

Location
- Country: France

Highway system
- Roads in France; Autoroutes; Routes nationales

The A43 autoroute (French: Autoroute A43), also known simply as the A43, the Autoroute alpine (lit. 'Alpine motorway') or the Autoroute de la Maurienne (lit. 'Motorway of Maurienne', after Aiton), is an autoroute (motorway) in France. Travelling through the French Alps, it connects the city of Lyon with the Tunnel du Fréjus, near Modane, which passes the Italian border towards Turin. The autoroute opened in phases as it was constructed between 1973 and 1998.

== Characteristics ==
- 2×2 lanes
- 2x3 lanes between the Boulevard Périphérique in Lyon, the A46 and the A48 (34 km)
- 2×4 lanes between the A46 and the A432 (7 km)
- 4+3 lanes between the A432 and the toll barrier at Saint-Quentin-Fallavier (7 km)
- 208 km long
- Service areas

== History ==
- 1973: Opening of the section between Lyon and Bourgoin-Jallieu.
- 1974: Opening of the section between Bourgoin-Jallieu and Chambéry.
- 1990: Widening of the road to 2x3 lanes between Saint-Quentin-Fallavier and the junction with the A48.
- 1991: Opening of the L'Epine Tunnel.
- 1991: Opening of section between Montmélian (A41) and Aiton. The section previously numbered A41 between Chambéry and Montmélian was re-numbered the A43.
- 1996: Opening of section between Aiton and Saint-Jean-de-Maurienne.
- 1998: Opening of section between Saint-Jean-de-Maurienne and Saint-Michel-de-Maurienne.
- 2000: Opening of section between Saint-Michel-de-Maurienne and Freney, and the incorporation of the N566 approach to the Fréjus Tunnel.
- 2002: Completion of Junction 11.
- 2004: Completion of Junction 20.

== List of exits and junctions ==
Region	Department	Junction	Destinations	Notes
Auvergne-Rhône-Alpes	Rhône	Boulevard périphérique de Lyon - A43 + Porte d'Essarts	Périphérique Nord : Paris (A6), Lyon - centre, Porte de Montchat + Porte du Vinatier	
Auvergne-Rhône-Alpes	Rhône	Boulevard périphérique de Lyon - A43 + Porte d'Essarts	Périphérique Sud : Marseille, Saint-Étienne, Porte de Parilly	
Auvergne-Rhône-Alpes	Rhône	Boulevard périphérique de Lyon - A43 + Porte d'Essarts	Lyon - Part-Dieu	
Auvergne-Rhône-Alpes	Rhône	1 : Bron - Parilly	Bron	
Auvergne-Rhône-Alpes	Rhône	2 : Bron - Rebufer	Bron, Parc de Parilly	
Auvergne-Rhône-Alpes	Rhône	3/3a/3b/3c : Porte des Alpes	Eurexpo, Université Lumière-Lyon 2, Bron - Albert-Camus, Parc de Parilly, Parc de Saint-Exupéry	
Auvergne-Rhône-Alpes	Rhône	4/4a/4b : Parc Technologique - Bron Aviation	Le Parc Technologique, Grenoble, Chambéry, Bron - Aviation	
Auvergne-Rhône-Alpes	Rhône	A46 & RN 346 - A43	Paris (A6), Z. I. Mi-Plaine, Eurexpo - Exposants	
Auvergne-Rhône-Alpes	Rhône	A46 & RN 346 - A43	Marseille, Saint-Étienne, Z. I. Lyon Sud-Est	
Auvergne-Rhône-Alpes	Rhône	Aire de Saint-Priest (Eastbound); Aire de Manissieux (Westbound)		
Auvergne-Rhône-Alpes	Rhône	A432 - A43	Aéroport de Saint-Exupéry, Pont-de-Chéruy, Crémieu, Strasbourg (A39), Genève, Bourg-en-Bresse (A42), Clermont-Ferrand (A89), Paris (A6)	
Auvergne-Rhône-Alpes	Rhône	E70 / A 43 becomes E70 / E711 / A 43		
Auvergne-Rhône-Alpes	Isère	5 : Saint-Quentin-Fallavier	Heyrieux, Pont-de-Chéruy, L'Isle-d'Abeau - Chesnes, Saint-Quentin-Fallavier, Parc d'activité de Chesnes	
Auvergne-Rhône-Alpes	Isère	Péage de Saint-Quentin-Fallavier		
Auvergne-Rhône-Alpes	Isère	6 : Villefontaine	Villefontaine, La Verpillière, Vaulx-Milieu, L'Isle-d'Abeau - Parc Technologique	
Auvergne-Rhône-Alpes	Isère	Aire d'Isle-d'Abeau		
Auvergne-Rhône-Alpes	Isère	7 : L'Isle-d'Abeau - centre	L'Isle-d'Abeau - Les Sayes, Morestel, Bourgoin-Jallieu - ouest, Crémieu	
Auvergne-Rhône-Alpes	Isère	8 : Bourgoin-Jallieu	Bourgoin-Jallieu - centre, Nivolas-Vermelle, Ruy-Montceau	
Auvergne-Rhône-Alpes	Isère	Aire du Vernay (Eastbound); Aire de Coiranne (Westbound)		
Auvergne-Rhône-Alpes	Isère	A48 - A43	Marseille, Valence (A49), Grenoble	
Auvergne-Rhône-Alpes	Isère	E70 / E711 / A 43 becomes E70 / A 43		
Auvergne-Rhône-Alpes	Isère	9 : La Tour-du-Pin	La Tour-du-Pin - centre	
Auvergne-Rhône-Alpes	Isère	9.1 : La Tour-du-Pin - est	La Tour-du-Pin	
Auvergne-Rhône-Alpes	Isère	Aire des Marouettes (Eastbound); Aire des Sitelles (Westbound)		
Auvergne-Rhône-Alpes	Isère	10 : Les Abrets	Le Pont-de-Beauvoisin, Isère, Les Avenières, Les Abrets	
Auvergne-Rhône-Alpes	Isère	Aire de Romagnieu (Eastbound); Aire du Guiers (Westtbound)		
Auvergne-Rhône-Alpes	Savoie	11 : Saint-Genix-sur-Guiers	Bourg-en-Bresse, Le Pont-de-Beauvoisin, Savoie, Belley, Saint-Genix-les-Villages	
Auvergne-Rhône-Alpes	Savoie	Aire du Lavaret (Eastbound); Aire de L'Omble (Westbound)		
Auvergne-Rhône-Alpes	Savoie	12 : Aiguebelette	Lac d'Aiguebelette, Novalaise, Aiguebelette-le-Lac	
Auvergne-Rhône-Alpes	Savoie	A41N & A43/A41 - A43	Genève, Annecy, Aix-les-Bains	
Auvergne-Rhône-Alpes	Savoie	A41N & A43/A41 - A43	Bourg-en-Bresse, Annecy, Aix-les-Bains, Lyon par RD, Le Bourget-du-Lac, Savoie Technolac, Aéroport de Chambéry - Savoie, Chambéry	
Auvergne-Rhône-Alpes	Savoie	E70 / A 43 overlaps and becomes E70 / E712 / A 43 / A 41		
Auvergne-Rhône-Alpes	Savoie	E70 / E712 / A 43 / A 41 becomes E70 / E712 / N 201		
Auvergne-Rhône-Alpes	Savoie	E70 / E712 / N 201 rebecomes E70 / E712 / A 43 / A 41		
Auvergne-Rhône-Alpes	Savoie	20 : Saint-Baldoph	Saint-Baldoph, Challes-les-Eaux, Myans	
Auvergne-Rhône-Alpes	Savoie	Aire du Granier (Eastbound); Aire de L'Abis (Westbound)		
Auvergne-Rhône-Alpes	Savoie	Péage de Chignin		
Auvergne-Rhône-Alpes	Savoie	21 : Chignin / Les Marches	Chignin, Les Marches	
Auvergne-Rhône-Alpes	Savoie	A41S - A43	Grenoble	
Auvergne-Rhône-Alpes	Savoie	E70 / E712 / A 43 / A 41 rebecomes E70 / A 43		
Auvergne-Rhône-Alpes	Savoie	22 : Montmélian	Montmélian	
Auvergne-Rhône-Alpes	Savoie	23 : Saint Pierre-d'Albigny	Saint-Pierre-d'Albigny, Massif des Bauges	
Auvergne-Rhône-Alpes	Savoie	23 : Saint Pierre-d'Albigny	Aire du Val Gelon (Eastbound); Aire de L'Arcluzaz (Westbound)	
Auvergne-Rhône-Alpes	Savoie	A430 - A43	Tarentaise, Val d’Arly, Beaufortain, Albertville	
Auvergne-Rhône-Alpes	Savoie	24 : Aiton	La Rochette, Saint-Pierre-d'Albigny, Chamoux-sur-Gelon	
Auvergne-Rhône-Alpes	Savoie	Aire de Saint-Pierre-de-Belleville (Eastbound)		
Auvergne-Rhône-Alpes	Savoie	25 : Saint-Pierre-de-Belleville / Epierre	Aiguebelle, chaîne des Hurtières, Épierre, Col du Grand Cucheron	
Auvergne-Rhône-Alpes	Savoie	Aire de Saint-Léger (Westbound)		
Auvergne-Rhône-Alpes	Savoie	26 : Saint-Marie-de-Cuines	La Chambre, vallée des Villards, Col de la Madeleine, Col du Glandon	
Auvergne-Rhône-Alpes	Savoie	26 : Saint-Marie-de-Cuines	Aire de Sainte-Marie-de-Cuines (Eastbound); Aire de Saint-Avre (Westbound)	
Auvergne-Rhône-Alpes	Savoie	27 : Hermillon	Saint-Jean-de-Maurienne, Hermillon, Vallée de l'Arvan, Col de la Croix de Fer	
Auvergne-Rhône-Alpes	Savoie	28 : Saint-Julien-Mont-Denis	Saint-Jean-de-Maurienne, Hermillon, Vallée de l'Arvan, Col de la Croix de Fer	
Auvergne-Rhône-Alpes	Savoie	Aire de Rieu Sec (Petrol only) (Eastbound); Aire de Saint Julien-Montdenis (Westbound)		
Auvergne-Rhône-Alpes	Savoie	29 : Saint-Michel-de-Maurienne	Saint-Michel-de-Maurienne, Valloire, Valmeinier, Col du Galibier	
Auvergne-Rhône-Alpes	Savoie	29 : Saint-Michel-de-Maurienne	Aire de Saint-Michel-de-Maurienne (Eastbound)	
Auvergne-Rhône-Alpes	Savoie	Péage de Saint Michel-de-Maurienne		
Auvergne-Rhône-Alpes	Savoie	Autoroute becomes single lane.		
Auvergne-Rhône-Alpes	Savoie	30 : Modane	Chambéry, Albertville, Saint-Jean-de-Maurienne par RD, Modane, Haute Maurienne, Vanoise, Col du Mont-Cenis, Col de l'Iseran	
Auvergne-Rhône-Alpes	Savoie	31 : Valfréjus	Valfréjus, Modane	
Auvergne-Rhône-Alpes	Savoie	Péage du Tunnel du Fréjus		
Auvergne-Rhône-Alpes	Savoie	E70 / A 43 becomes E70 / N 543		
French - Italian Border in the middle of the tunnel ; E70 / N 543 ( E70 / A 43) becomes E80 / T 4 ( E80 / A 32)
