= A49 autoroute =

Road in France

A49 autoroute

Route information
- Part of E713
- Maintained by AREA
- Length: 70.4 km (43.7 mi)
- Existed: 1992–present

Major junctions
- East end: E711 / E713 / A 48 in Voreppe

- West end: E713 / N 532 in Châteauneuf-sur-Isère / Bourg-de-Péage

Location
- Country: France

Highway system
- Roads in France; Autoroutes; Routes nationales

The A49 autoroute is a motorway in France. The road provides a connection between Romans (Valence) with Voreppe (Grenoble).

== History ==
The first section was opened in 1991 between the junction with the A48 towards Voreppe and the junction at Tullins (N°11). Its extension to Romans-sur-Isère was opened in 1992.

== Junctions ==
| Region | Department | Junction | Destinations | Notes |
|---|---|---|---|---|
| Auvergne-Rhône-Alpes | Isère | A48 - A49 | Grenoble, Turin-Milan | |
| Auvergne-Rhône-Alpes | Isère | A48 - A49 | Genève (A41), Chambéry, Lyon (A43), Voiron | |
| Auvergne-Rhône-Alpes | Isère | 11 : Tullins | Tullins, Moirans | |
| Auvergne-Rhône-Alpes | Isère | Aire de Poliénas (Westbound); Aire de L'Albenc (Eastbound) | | |
| Auvergne-Rhône-Alpes | Isère | 10 : Vinay | Vinay | |
| Auvergne-Rhône-Alpes | Isère | Aire de Saint-Sauveur (Westbound); Aire de Chambaran (Eastbound) | | |
| Auvergne-Rhône-Alpes | Isère | 9 : Saint-Marcelin | Saint-Marcellin, Pont-en-Royans | |
| Auvergne-Rhône-Alpes | Drôme | Aire de La Porte de la Drôme (Westbound); Aire de Royans-en-Vercors (Eastbound) | | |
| Auvergne-Rhône-Alpes | Drôme | 8 : La Baume d'Hostun | Saint-Nazaire-en-Royans, La Baume-d'Hostun, Villard-de-Lans, Pont-en-Royans | |
| Auvergne-Rhône-Alpes | Drôme | Péage de Chatuzange-le-Goubet | | |
| Auvergne-Rhône-Alpes | Drôme | 7 : Romans - est | Chambéry, Grenoble par RD, Romans-sur-Isère, Beaurepaire, Bourg-de-Péage | |
| Auvergne-Rhône-Alpes | Drôme | 6 : Romans - centre | Romans-sur-Isère, Bourg-de-Péage, Crest, Chabeuil | |
| Auvergne-Rhône-Alpes | Drôme | E713 / A 49 becomes E713 / N 532 | | |
| Auvergne-Rhône-Alpes | Drôme | 5 Alixan | Châteauneuf-sur-Isère, Alixan, Rovaltain - nord | |
| Auvergne-Rhône-Alpes | Drôme | 5 Alixan | Aire de Bayanne (Westbound); Aire de Marlhes (Eastbound) | |
| Auvergne-Rhône-Alpes | Drôme | 4 : Valence T.G.V. | Valence TGV station, Rovaltain - sud, Z. I. Les Plaines | |
| Auvergne-Rhône-Alpes | Drôme | 3 : Saint-Marcel-lès-Valence - nord | Saint-Marcel-lès-Valence | |
| Auvergne-Rhône-Alpes | Drôme | Aire des Fruitiers (Eastbound) | | |
| Auvergne-Rhône-Alpes | Drôme | 2 : Saint-Marcel-lès-Valence - sud | Saint-Marcel-lès-Valence - Le Plovier, Z. I. Laye | |
| Auvergne-Rhône-Alpes | Drôme | E713 / N 532 becomes E713 / N 7 | | |
| Auvergne-Rhône-Alpes | Drôme | 35 : Valence - Les Couleures ( RN 7 - RN 532) | Lyon, Valence - centre, Bourg-lès-Valence | |
| Auvergne-Rhône-Alpes | Drôme | 34 : Valence - Briffaut | Valence, Aéroport de Valence-Chabeuil, Malissard | |
| Auvergne-Rhône-Alpes | Drôme | 33 : Beaumont-lès-Valence | Beaumont-lès-Valence, Valence, Malissard, Université, Technoparcs | |
| Auvergne-Rhône-Alpes | Drôme | 32 : Saint-Marcel-lès-Valence - sud | Montéléger, Beauvallon, Valence, Centre Hospitalier | |
| Auvergne-Rhône-Alpes | Drôme | 31 : Valence - Fontlozier | Gap, Montélimar, Privas, Crest, Valence, Les Aureats | |
| Auvergne-Rhône-Alpes | Drôme | 30 : Valence - Victor Hugo | Le Puy-en-Velay, Guilherand-Granges, Portes-lès-Valence, Valence, Z. I. La Motte, Parc de l'Épervière | |
| Auvergne-Rhône-Alpes | Drôme | A7 - RN 7 | Lyon, | |
| Auvergne-Rhône-Alpes | Drôme | A7 - RN 7 | Marseille, Avignon, Montélimar, Privas | |
1.000 mi = 1.609 km; 1.000 km = 0.621 mi
