= A430 =

A430 may refer to:

- A430 motorway (France)
- A430 road (England)
- A.430, a type of aircraft
- Canon PowerShot A430, a camera
