= A48 autoroute =

Road in France

A48 autoroute
- Autoroute du Dauphiné

Route information
- Part of E711 / E713
- Maintained by AREA
- Length: 52.5 km (32.6 mi)
- Existed: 1968–present

Major junctions
- South end: E70 / E711 / A 43 in Cessieu

- E713 / A 49 in Voreppe

- North end: A 480 in Saint-Égrève near Grenoble

Location
- Country: France

Highway system
- Roads in France; Autoroutes; Routes nationales

The A48 autoroute, also known as l'autoroute du Dauphiné, is a motorway in France connecting the A43 with the city of Grenoble.

An extension north to Ambérieu is proposed in the medium term.

== Characteristics ==
- 2x2 lanes
- 2x3 lanes between the A49 and A480 autoroutes (10 km)
- 97 km long
- Service areas

== History ==
- 1968: The first toll free section opened between the Bastille (Grenoble northern edge) and Voreppe as part of the preparations for the Winter Olympics held in the city and surrounding area.
- 1975: Opening of the toll section between Voreppe and the A43 managed by AREA.

== Junctions ==
Region	Department	Junction	Destinations	Notes
Auvergne-Rhône-Alpes	Isère	A43 - A48	Strasbourg (A39), Paris (A6), Bourg-en-Bresse (A42), Lyon, Lyon-Saint-Exupéry Airport, Bourgoin-Jallieu	
Auvergne-Rhône-Alpes	Isère	A43 - A48	Genève (A41), Chambéry, La Tour-du-Pin	
Auvergne-Rhône-Alpes	Isère	Aire de Ponteray (Southbound); Aire de Chanses (Northbound)		
Auvergne-Rhône-Alpes	Isère	Aire de Burcin (Southbound); Aire d'Oyeu (Northbound)		
Auvergne-Rhône-Alpes	Isère	9 : Rives	Vienne, Rives, La Côte-Saint-André, Lac de Paladru, Grenoble-Isère Airport	
Auvergne-Rhône-Alpes	Isère	Aire du Châtelard (Southbound); Aire de Réaumont (Northbound)		
Auvergne-Rhône-Alpes	Isère	10 : Voiron	Voiron - Champfeuillet, Les Abrets	
Auvergne-Rhône-Alpes	Isère	11 : Moirans	Coublevie, Moirans, Voreppe, Voiron - centre, Centre'Alp	
Auvergne-Rhône-Alpes	Isère	A49 - A48	Marseille (A7), Valence	
Auvergne-Rhône-Alpes	Isère	E711 / A 48 becomes E711 / E713 / A 48		
Auvergne-Rhône-Alpes	Isère	Péage de Voreppe		
Auvergne-Rhône-Alpes	Isère	12 : Veurey	Valence par RD, Voreppe	
Auvergne-Rhône-Alpes	Isère	12 : Veurey	Aire de l'Île Rose (Southbound); Aire de Voreppe (Northbound)	
Auvergne-Rhône-Alpes	Isère	13 : Voreppe	Lyon, Voiron par RD, Voreppe	
Auvergne-Rhône-Alpes	Isère	14 : Saint-Égrève	Saint-Égrève - nord, Fontanil-Cornillon, Autrans, Villard-de-Lans	
Auvergne-Rhône-Alpes	Isère	A480 & RN 481 ( 15 : Saint-Martin-le-Vinoux ) - A48	Grenoble - centre, Rocade Sud, Sisteron (A51), Turin - Milan	
Auvergne-Rhône-Alpes	Isère	A480 & RN 481 ( 15 : Saint-Martin-le-Vinoux ) - A48	Saint-Martin-le-Vinoux, Grenoble - Bastille, Presqu'Île, Hôpital Nord	
Auvergne-Rhône-Alpes	Isère	E711 / E713 / A 48 becomes E711 / E713 / N 481		
Auvergne-Rhône-Alpes	Isère	15 : Saint-Martin-le-Vinoux - Z. I.	Z. I. Saint-Martin-le-Vinoux, Z. I. Saint-Égrève	Entry and exit from Grenoble
Auvergne-Rhône-Alpes	Isère	16 : Grenoble -Europôle	Grenoble - Presqu'Île, Parc d'Oxford, Europôle	
Auvergne-Rhône-Alpes	Isère	17 : Saint-Martin-le-Vinoux - centre	Saint-Martin-le-Vinoux, Saint-Égrève - sud	Entry and exit from Grenoble
End of the E711 / E713 / N 481 and enters in the city of Grenoble
1.000 mi = 1.609 km; 1.000 km = 0.621 mi

== Places of interest ==
The following list indexes towns and places of interest that can be visited from the motorway:

- River Isère
- Col de Rossatière
- Lac de Paladru
- Chartreuse Mountains

== Future ==
There are proposals to extend the autoroute north from Bourgoin-Jallieu to Ambérieu-in-Bugey and connecting to the A42 autoroute.
