= Rambaud =

Rambaud may refer to:

People

- Honorat Rambaud (1516–1586), French grammarian and inventor of a new French alphabet
- Agathe de Rambaud (1764–1853), French nurse in charge of the Dauphin from 1785 to 1792
- Alfred Nicolas Rambaud (1842–1905), French historian
- Patrick Rambaud (born 1946), French writer

Places

- Rambaud, Hautes-Alpes, France
- La Chapelle-Rambaud, Haute-Savoie, France
