= Menthonnex-en-Bornes =

Menthonnex-en-Bornes Mintné-an-Beûrne (Savoyard)
- Commune
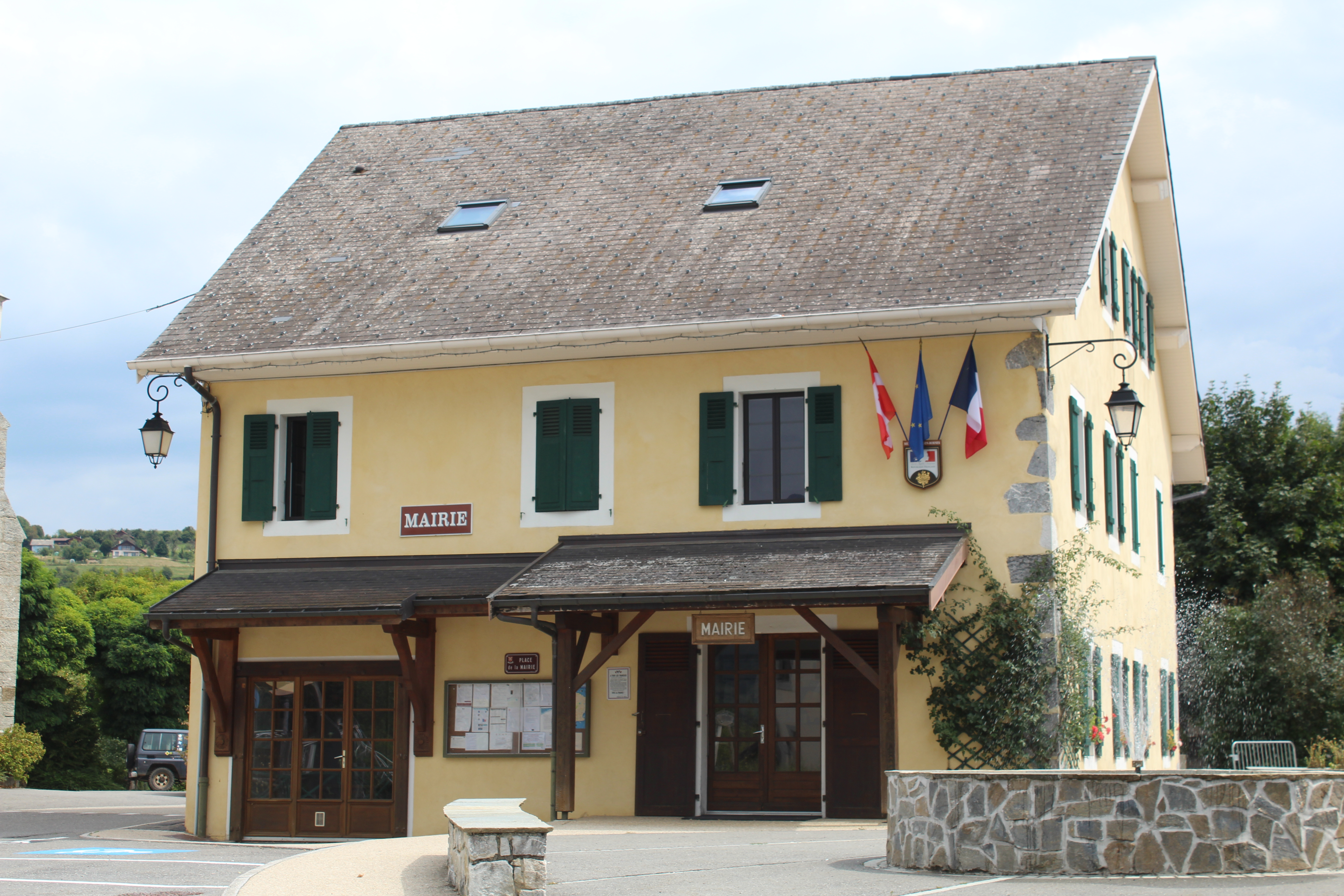
- Town hall

- Coat of arms
- Location of Menthonnex-en-Bornes
- Location within France Location within Auvergne-Rhône-Alpes
- Coordinates: 46°03′12″N 6°10′26″E
- Country: France
- Region: Auvergne-Rhône-Alpes
- Department: Haute-Savoie
- Arrondissement: Saint-Julien-en-Genevois
- Canton: La Roche-sur-Foron
- Intercommunality: CC Pays de Cruseilles

Government
  - Mayor (2020–2026): Guy Demolis
- Area^{1}: 8.48 km^{2} (3.27 sq mi)
- Elevation: 792 m (2,598 ft)
- Highest elevation: 964 m (3,163 ft)
- Lowest elevation: 690 m (2,260 ft)
- Population (2023): 1,115
  - Density: 131/km^{2} (341/sq mi)
- Time zone: UTC+01:00 (CET)
  - Summer (DST): UTC+02:00 (CEST)
- INSEE/Postal code: 74177 /74350
- ^{1} French Land Register data, which excludes lakes, ponds, glaciers > 1 km^{2} (0.386 sq mi or 247 acres) and river estuaries.

Menthonnex-en-Bornes (Savoyard: Mintné-an-Beûrne) is a commune in the Haute-Savoie department in the Auvergne-Rhône-Alpes region in south-eastern France.

== Geography ==
Menthonnex-en-Bornes is located 17.4 km (10.8 mi) as the crow flies to the north of the departmental seat, the commune of Annecy.

By road, the commune is about halfway between Geneva (33 km (21 mi)) and Annecy (25.0 km (15.5 mi)) on the plateau of Bornes. It is separated from the mountain Salève by the Les Usses river valley, which forms its western border. The southern border is defined by the stream Grand Verray.

== Pronunciation ==
The final ex in Menthonnex is not pronounced; it should be read as Menthonné.

== See also ==
- Communes of the Haute-Savoie department
