= Cernex =

Cernex Sarné (Savoyard)
- Commune
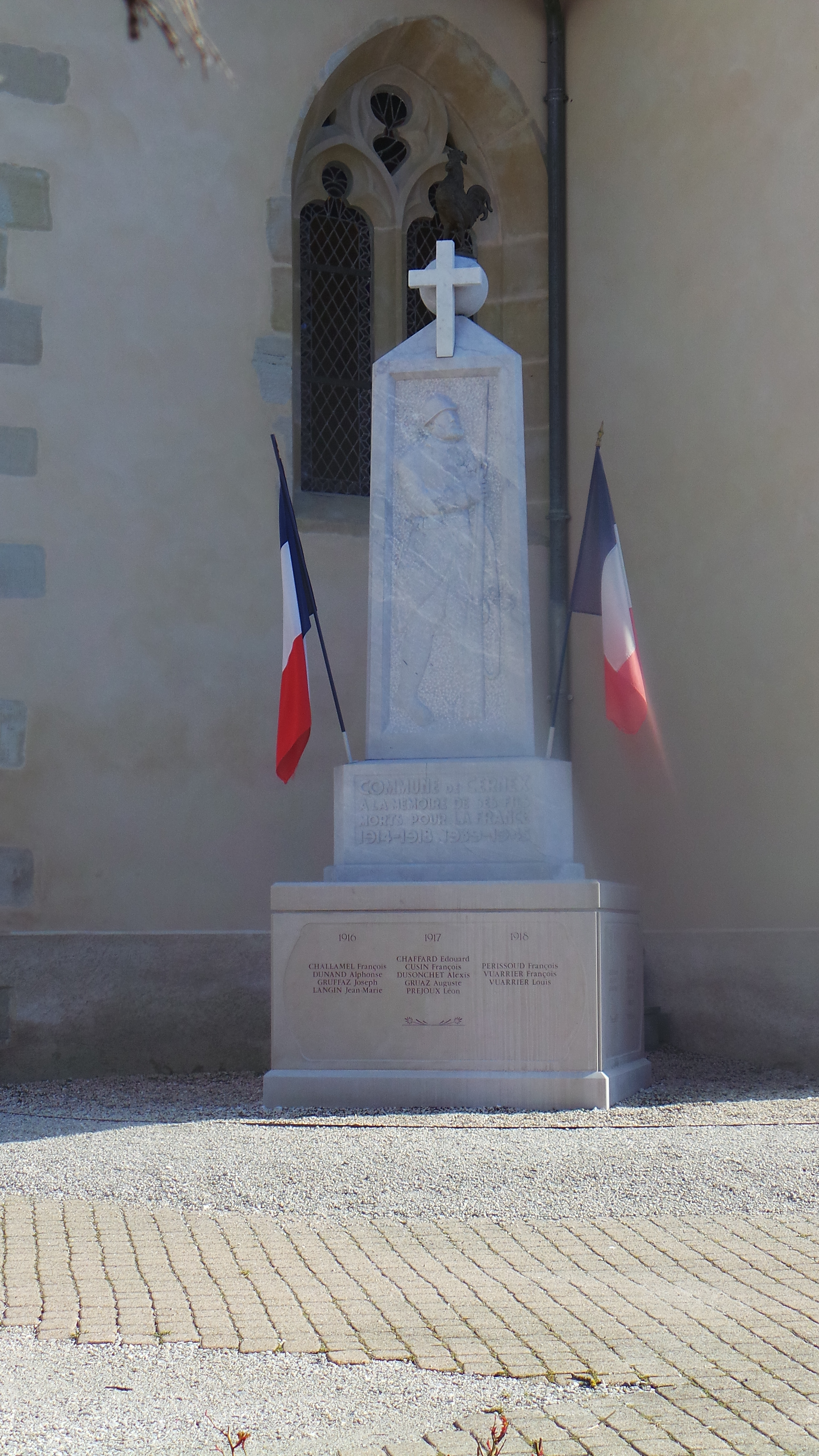
- The war memorial in Cernex

- Coat of arms
- Location of Cernex
- Location within France Location within Auvergne-Rhône-Alpes
- Coordinates: 46°03′54″N 6°03′06″E
- Country: France
- Region: Auvergne-Rhône-Alpes
- Department: Haute-Savoie
- Arrondissement: Saint-Julien-en-Genevois
- Canton: La Roche-sur-Foron
- Intercommunality: CC Pays de Cruseilles

Government
  - Mayor (2020–2026): Vincent Tissot
- Area^{1}: 12.66 km^{2} (4.89 sq mi)
- Highest elevation: 857 m (2,812 ft)
- Lowest elevation: 407 m (1,335 ft)
- Population (2023): 1,184
  - Density: 93.52/km^{2} (242.2/sq mi)
- Demonym: Cernexiens
- Time zone: UTC+01:00 (CET)
  - Summer (DST): UTC+02:00 (CEST)
- INSEE/Postal code: 74052 /74350
- Website: www.cernex.fr
- ^{1} French Land Register data, which excludes lakes, ponds, glaciers > 1 km^{2} (0.386 sq mi or 247 acres) and river estuaries.

Cernex (Savoyard: Sarné) is a commune in the Haute-Savoie department in the Auvergne-Rhône-Alpes region in south-eastern France.

== Toponymy ==
As with many polysyllabic Arpitan toponyms or anthroponyms, the final -x marks oxytonic stress (on the last syllable), whereas the final -z indicates paroxytonic stress (on the penultimate syllable) and should not be pronounced, although in French it is often mispronounced due to hypercorrection.

== See also ==
- Communes of the Haute-Savoie department
