= Eteaux =

Eteaux Étô (Savoyard)
- Commune
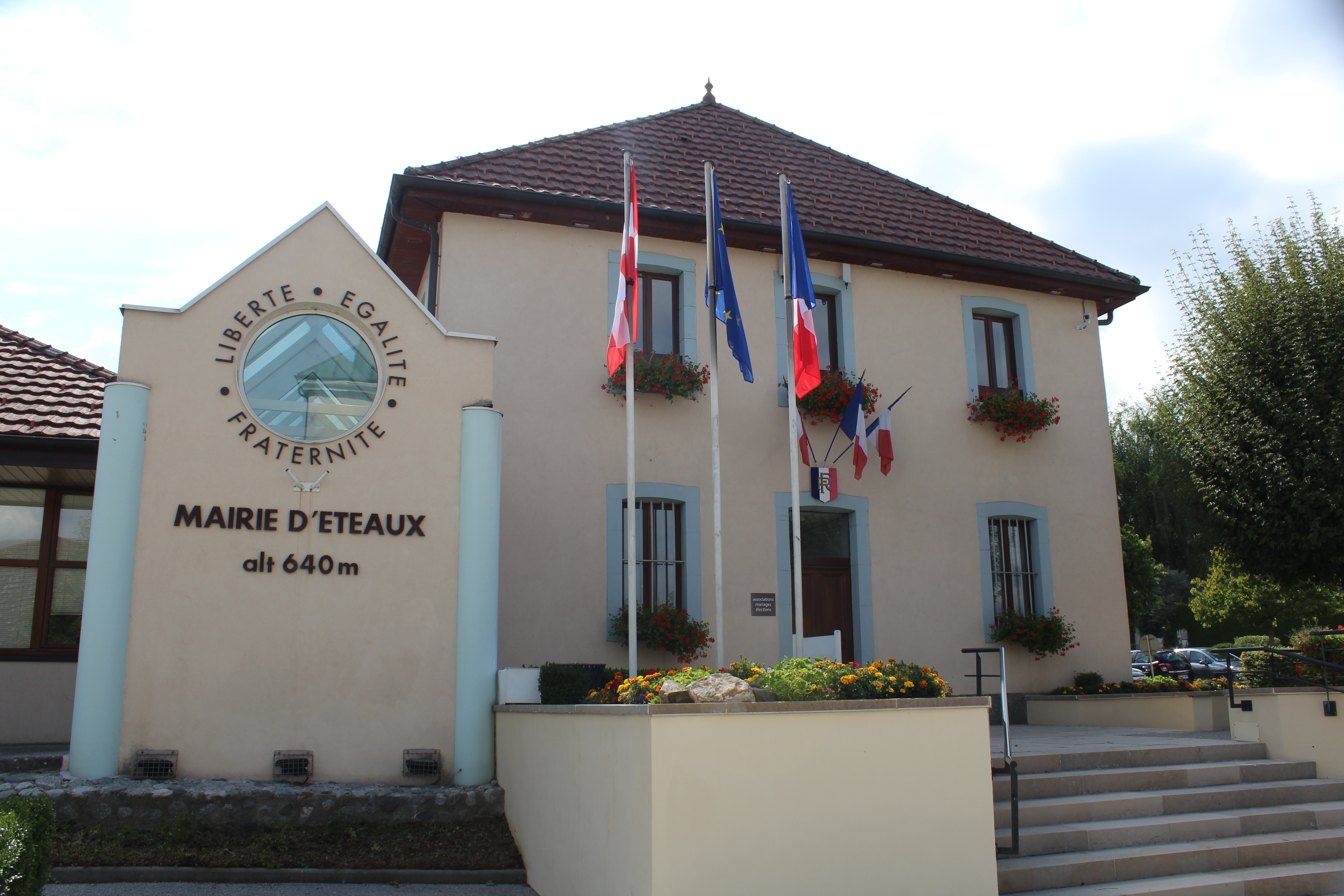
- Town hall
- Location of Eteaux
- Location within France Location within Auvergne-Rhône-Alpes
- Coordinates: 46°03′59″N 6°17′41″E
- Country: France
- Region: Auvergne-Rhône-Alpes
- Department: Haute-Savoie
- Arrondissement: Bonneville
- Canton: La Roche-sur-Foron
- Intercommunality: Pays Rochois

Government
  - Mayor (2020–2026): David Ratsimba
- Area^{1}: 13.69 km^{2} (5.29 sq mi)
- Highest elevation: 922 m (3,025 ft)
- Lowest elevation: 580 m (1,900 ft)
- Population (2023): 2,180
  - Density: 159/km^{2} (412/sq mi)
- Time zone: UTC+01:00 (CET)
  - Summer (DST): UTC+02:00 (CEST)
- INSEE/Postal code: 74116 /74800
- ^{1} French Land Register data, which excludes lakes, ponds, glaciers > 1 km^{2} (0.386 sq mi or 247 acres) and river estuaries.

Eteaux (before 2026: Etaux, Savoyard: Étô) is a commune in the Haute-Savoie department in the Auvergne-Rhône-Alpes region in south-eastern France.

== Population ==
Historical population
Year	Pop.	±% p.a.
1968	450	—
1975	519	+2.06%
1982	638	+2.99%
1990	878	+4.07%
1999	1,090	+2.43%
2007	1,580	+4.75%
2012	1,790	+2.53%
2017	1,979	+2.03%
2023	2,180	+1.63%
Source: INSEE

== See also ==
- Communes of the Haute-Savoie department
