= La Rochette, Savoie =

La Rochette La Rosheta (Savoyard)
- Part of Valgelon-La Rochette
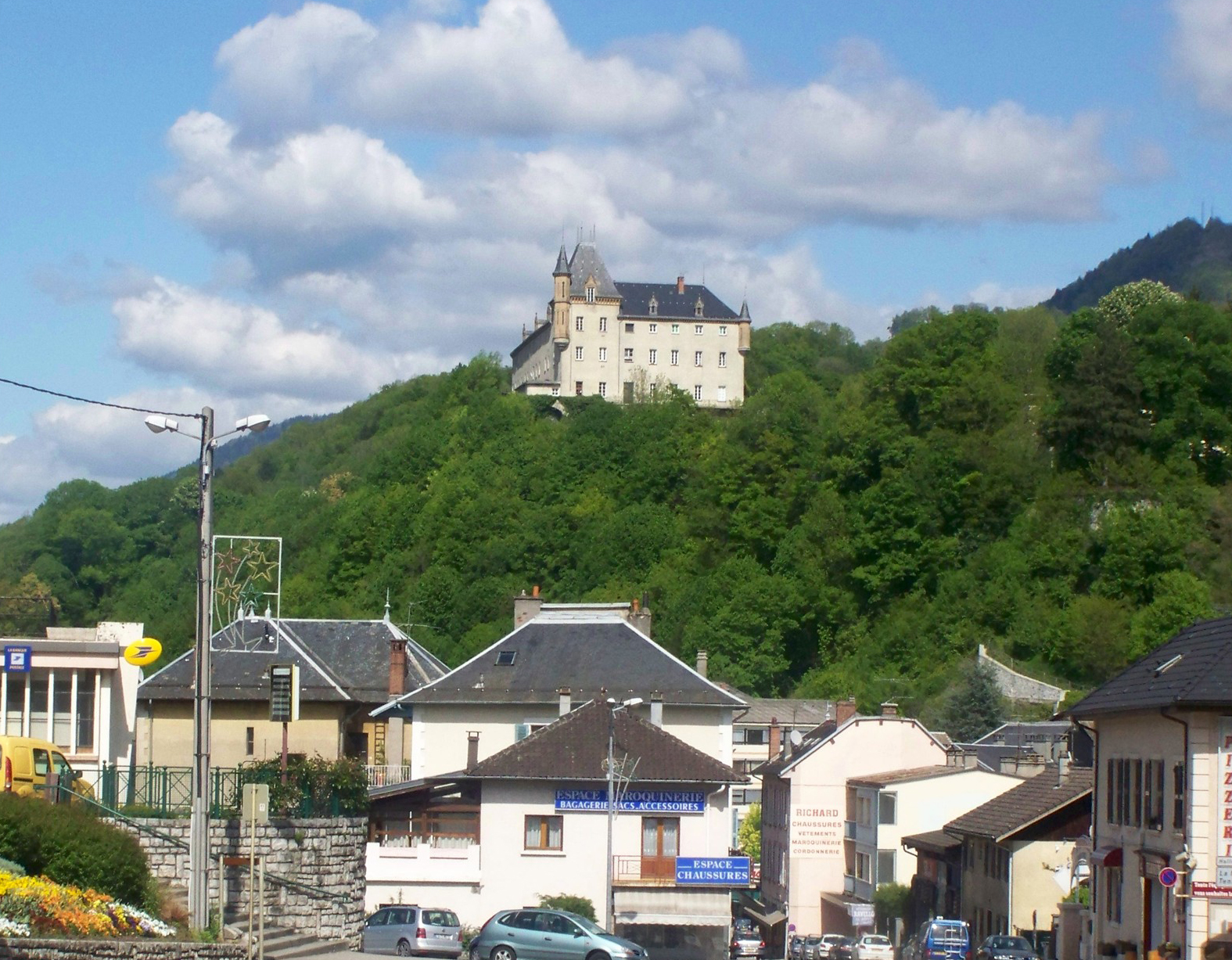
- The centre of La Rochette, and the chateau

- Coat of arms
- Location of La Rochette
- Location within France Location within Auvergne-Rhône-Alpes
- Coordinates: 45°27′34″N 6°07′16″E
- Country: France
- Region: Auvergne-Rhône-Alpes
- Department: Savoie
- Arrondissement: Chambéry
- Canton: Montmélian
- Commune: Valgelon-La Rochette
- Area^{1}: 4.66 km^{2} (1.80 sq mi)
- Highest elevation: 807 m (2,648 ft)
- Lowest elevation: 322 m (1,056 ft)
- Population (2022): 3,754
  - Density: 806/km^{2} (2,090/sq mi)
- Time zone: UTC+01:00 (CET)
  - Summer (DST): UTC+02:00 (CEST)
- Postal code: 73110
- Website: www.la-rochette.com
- ^{1} French Land Register data, which excludes lakes, ponds, glaciers > 1 km^{2} (0.386 sq mi or 247 acres) and river estuaries.

La Rochette (French pronunciation: [la ʁɔʃɛt]; Savoyard: La Rosheta) is a former commune in the Savoie department in the Auvergne-Rhône-Alpes region in south-eastern France. On 1 January 2019, it was merged into the new commune Valgelon-La Rochette.

== See also ==
- Communes of the Savoie department
