= Saint-Laurent, Haute-Savoie =

Saint-Laurent San-Loran (Savoyard)
- Commune
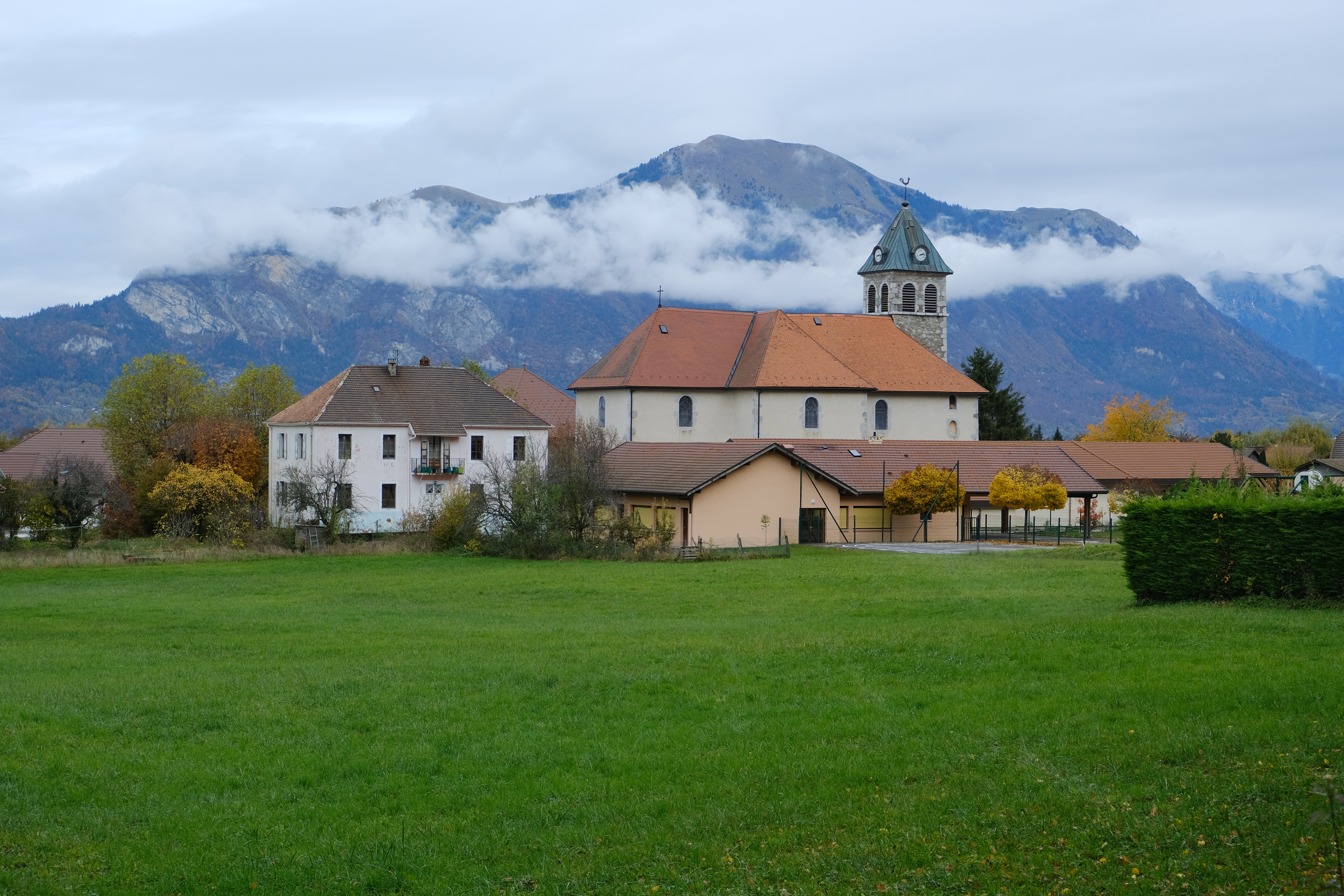
- Location of Saint-Laurent
- Location within France Location within Auvergne-Rhône-Alpes
- Coordinates: 46°02′51″N 6°21′35″E
- Country: France
- Region: Auvergne-Rhône-Alpes
- Department: Haute-Savoie
- Arrondissement: Bonneville
- Canton: La Roche-sur-Foron
- Intercommunality: CC du Pays Rochois

Government
  - Mayor (2020–2026): Boris Avouac
- Area^{1}: 10.96 km^{2} (4.23 sq mi)
- Highest elevation: 1,809 m (5,935 ft)
- Lowest elevation: 520 m (1,710 ft)
- Population (2023): 841
  - Density: 76.7/km^{2} (199/sq mi)
- Time zone: UTC+01:00 (CET)
  - Summer (DST): UTC+02:00 (CEST)
- INSEE/Postal code: 74244 /74800
- ^{1} French Land Register data, which excludes lakes, ponds, glaciers > 1 km^{2} (0.386 sq mi or 247 acres) and river estuaries.

Saint-Laurent (French pronunciation: [sɛ̃ loʁɑ̃]; Savoyard: San-Loran) is a commune in the Haute-Savoie department in the Auvergne-Rhône-Alpes region in south-eastern France.

== See also ==
- Communes of the Haute-Savoie department
