= Cercier =

Cercier Sarsi (Savoyard)
- Commune
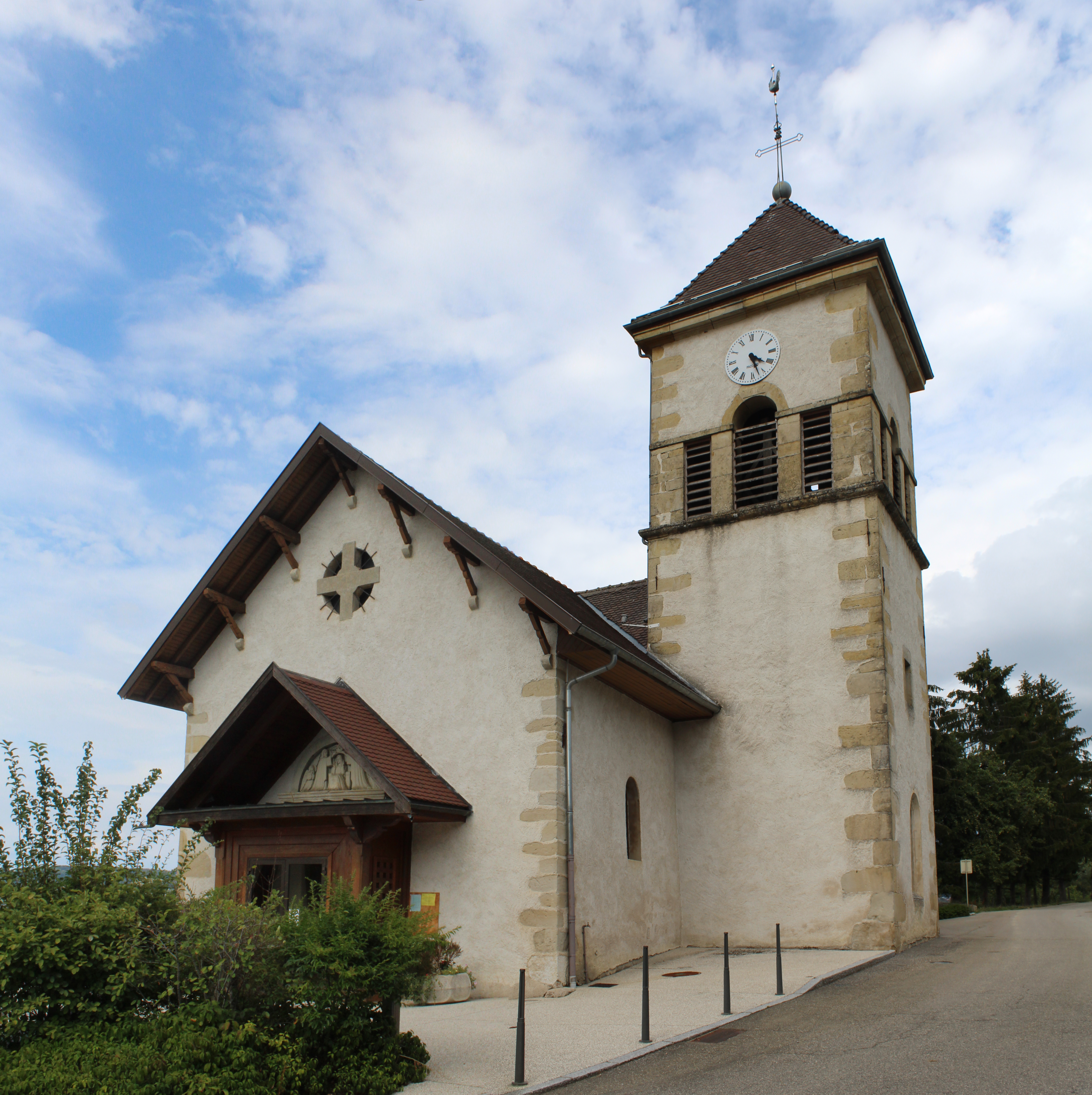
- Church of Notre-Dame-de-l'Assomption
- Location of Cercier
- Location within France Location within Auvergne-Rhône-Alpes
- Coordinates: 46°01′34″N 6°02′56″E
- Country: France
- Region: Auvergne-Rhône-Alpes
- Department: Haute-Savoie
- Arrondissement: Saint-Julien-en-Genevois
- Canton: La Roche-sur-Foron
- Intercommunality: CC Pays de Cruseilles

Government
  - Mayor (2020–2026): Patrice Primault
- Area^{1}: 11.46 km^{2} (4.42 sq mi)
- Highest elevation: 713 m (2,339 ft)
- Lowest elevation: 390 m (1,280 ft)
- Population (2023): 734
  - Density: 64.0/km^{2} (166/sq mi)
- Time zone: UTC+01:00 (CET)
  - Summer (DST): UTC+02:00 (CEST)
- INSEE/Postal code: 74051 /74350
- ^{1} French Land Register data, which excludes lakes, ponds, glaciers > 1 km^{2} (0.386 sq mi or 247 acres) and river estuaries.

Cercier (French pronunciation: [sɛʁsje]; Savoyard: Sarsi) is a commune in the Haute-Savoie department in the Auvergne-Rhône-Alpes region in south-eastern France.

== See also ==
- Communes of the Haute-Savoie department
