= Canton of La Roche-sur-Foron =

French canton

Coordinates: 46.07°N 6.31°E

The canton of La Roche-sur-Foron is an administrative division of the Haute-Savoie department, southeastern France. Its borders were modified at the French canton reorganisation which came into effect in March 2015. Its seat is in La Roche-sur-Foron.

It consists of the following communes:

1. Allonzier-la-Caille
2. Amancy
3. Andilly
4. Arbusigny
5. Cercier
6. Cernex
7. La Chapelle-Rambaud
8. Copponex
9. Cornier
10. Cruseilles
11. Cuvat
12. Eteaux
13. Menthonnex-en-Bornes
14. Monnetier-Mornex
15. La Muraz
16. Nangy
17. Pers-Jussy
18. Reignier-Esery
19. La Roche-sur-Foron
20. Saint-Blaise
21. Saint-Laurent
22. Saint-Sixt
23. Le Sappey
24. Scientrier
25. Villy-le-Bouveret
26. Villy-le-Pelloux
27. Vovray-en-Bornes
