= Les Marches =

Les Marches Le Mârshé (Savoyard)
- Part of Porte-de-Savoie
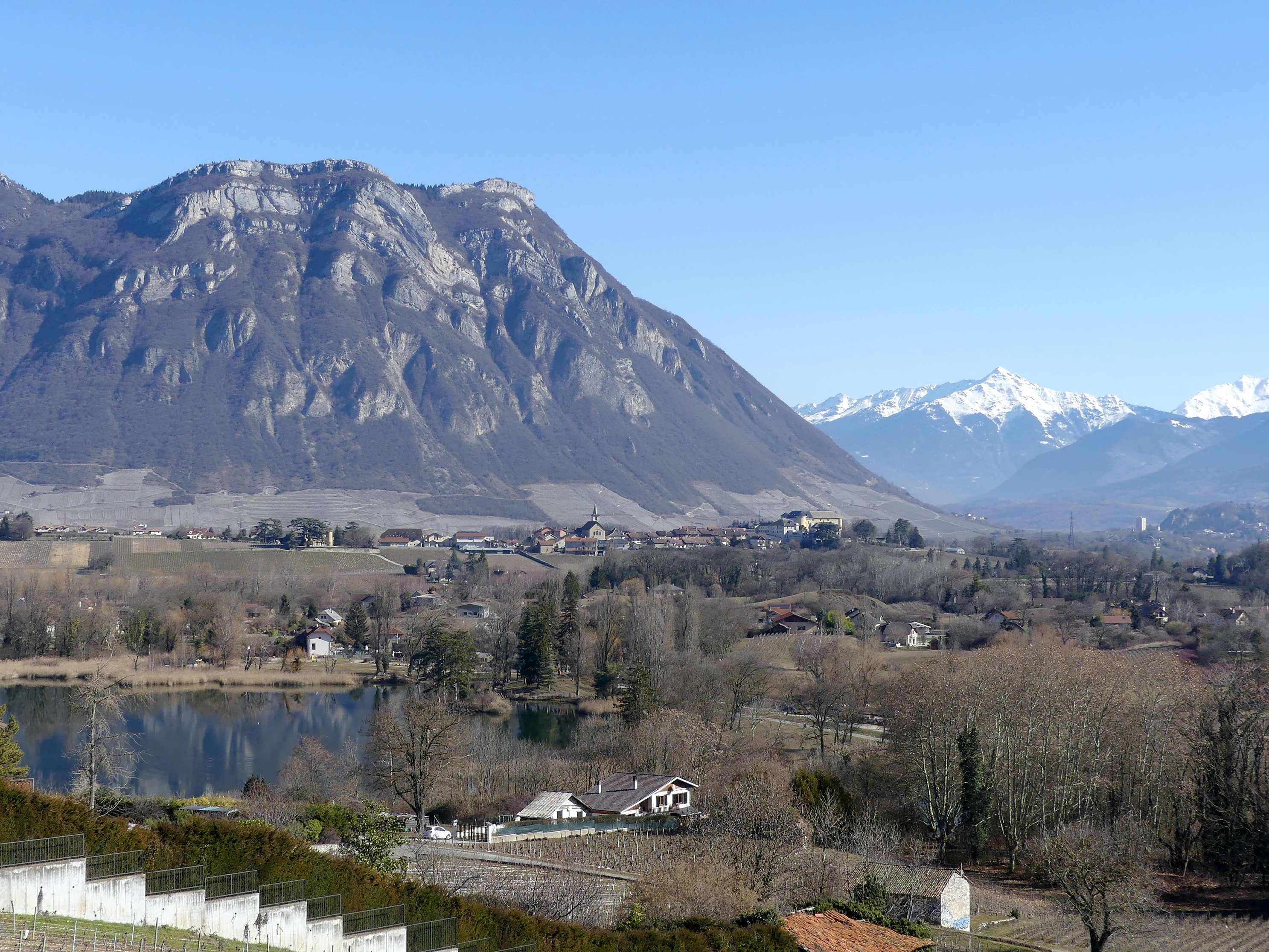
- Sight of Les Marches in winter.
- Location of Les Marches
- Location within France Location within Auvergne-Rhône-Alpes
- Coordinates: 45°30′00″N 6°00′06″E
- Country: France
- Region: Auvergne-Rhône-Alpes
- Department: Savoie
- Arrondissement: Chambéry
- Canton: Montmélian
- Commune: Porte-de-Savoie
- Area^{1}: 15.35 km^{2} (5.93 sq mi)
- Elevation: 807 m (2,648 ft)
- Highest elevation: 1,115 m (3,658 ft)
- Lowest elevation: 244 m (801 ft)
- Population (2022): 2,791
  - Density: 181.8/km^{2} (470.9/sq mi)
- Time zone: UTC+01:00 (CET)
  - Summer (DST): UTC+02:00 (CEST)
- Postal code: 73800
- Dialling codes: 0479
- Website: www.lesmarches.fr
- ^{1} French Land Register data, which excludes lakes, ponds, glaciers > 1 km^{2} (0.386 sq mi or 247 acres) and river estuaries.

Les Marches (French pronunciation: [le maʁʃ]; Savoyard: Le Mârshé) is a former commune in the Savoie department in the Auvergne-Rhône-Alpes region in south-eastern France. On 1 January 2019, it was merged into the new commune Porte-de-Savoie.

== Twin towns ==
It is twinned with

- Stepps and Cardowan near Glasgow, Scotland, United Kingdom. Les Marches translates in English as 'The Steps' and it was this connection that was noticed by a Les Marches resident in 1995 on a visit to Scotland.

== See also ==
- Communes of the Savoie department
