= Étable =

Étable Étobla (Savoyard)
- Part of Valgelon-La Rochette
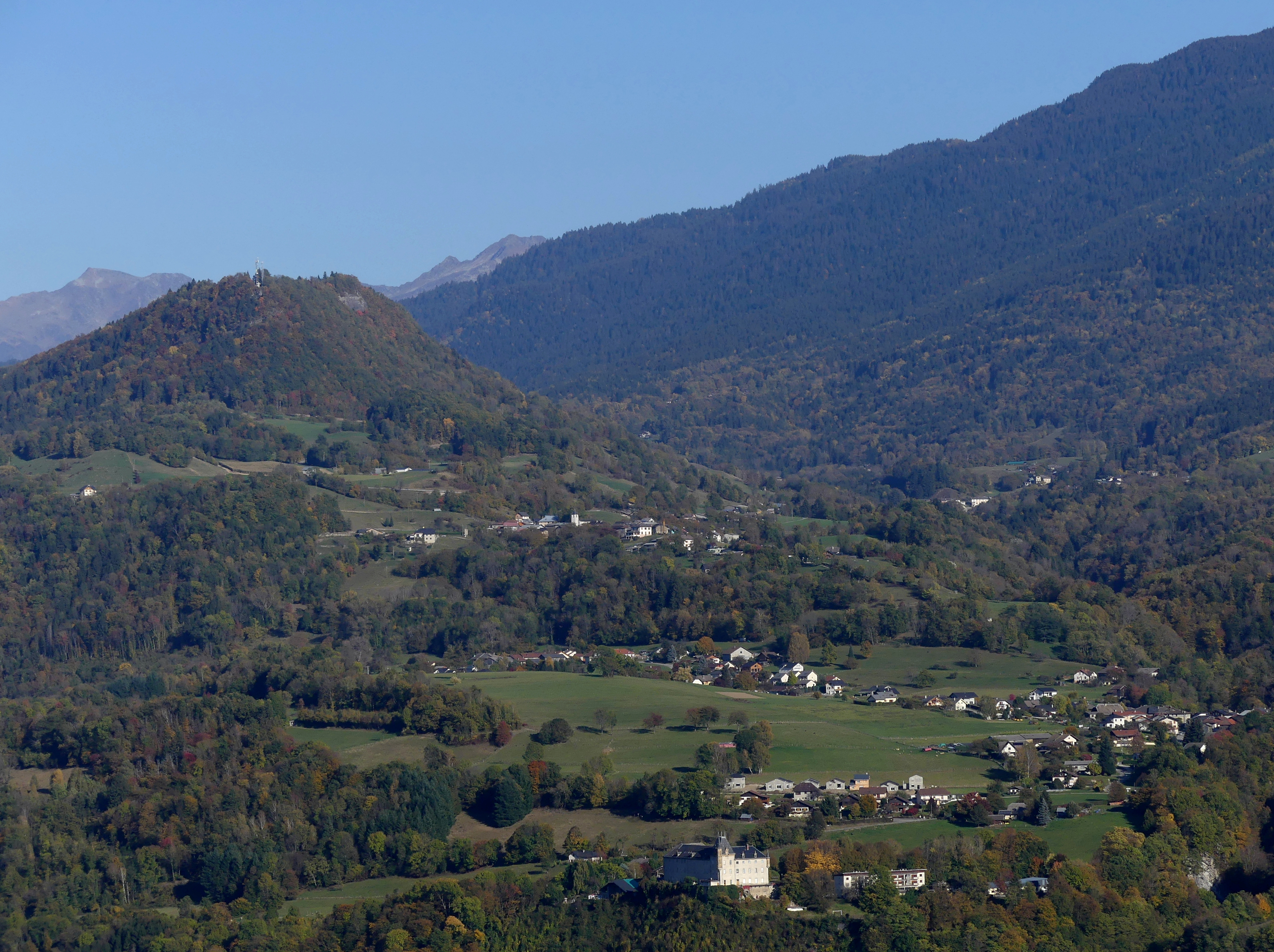
- Location of Étable
- Location within France Location within Auvergne-Rhône-Alpes
- Coordinates: 45°27′54″N 6°08′41″E
- Country: France
- Region: Auvergne-Rhône-Alpes
- Department: Savoie
- Arrondissement: Chambéry
- Canton: Montmélian
- Commune: Valgelon-La Rochette
- Area^{1}: 2.7 km^{2} (1.0 sq mi)
- Highest elevation: 860 m (2,820 ft)
- Lowest elevation: 393 m (1,289 ft)
- Population (2022): 431
  - Density: 160/km^{2} (410/sq mi)
- Time zone: UTC+01:00 (CET)
  - Summer (DST): UTC+02:00 (CEST)
- Postal code: 73110
- ^{1} French Land Register data, which excludes lakes, ponds, glaciers > 1 km^{2} (0.386 sq mi or 247 acres) and river estuaries.

Étable (French pronunciation: [etabl]; Savoyard: Étobla) is a former commune in the Savoie department in the Auvergne-Rhône-Alpes region in south-eastern France. On 1 January 2019, it was merged into the new commune Valgelon-La Rochette.

== See also ==
- Communes of the Savoie department
