= Andilly, Haute-Savoie =

Andilly Andlyi (Savoyard)
- Commune
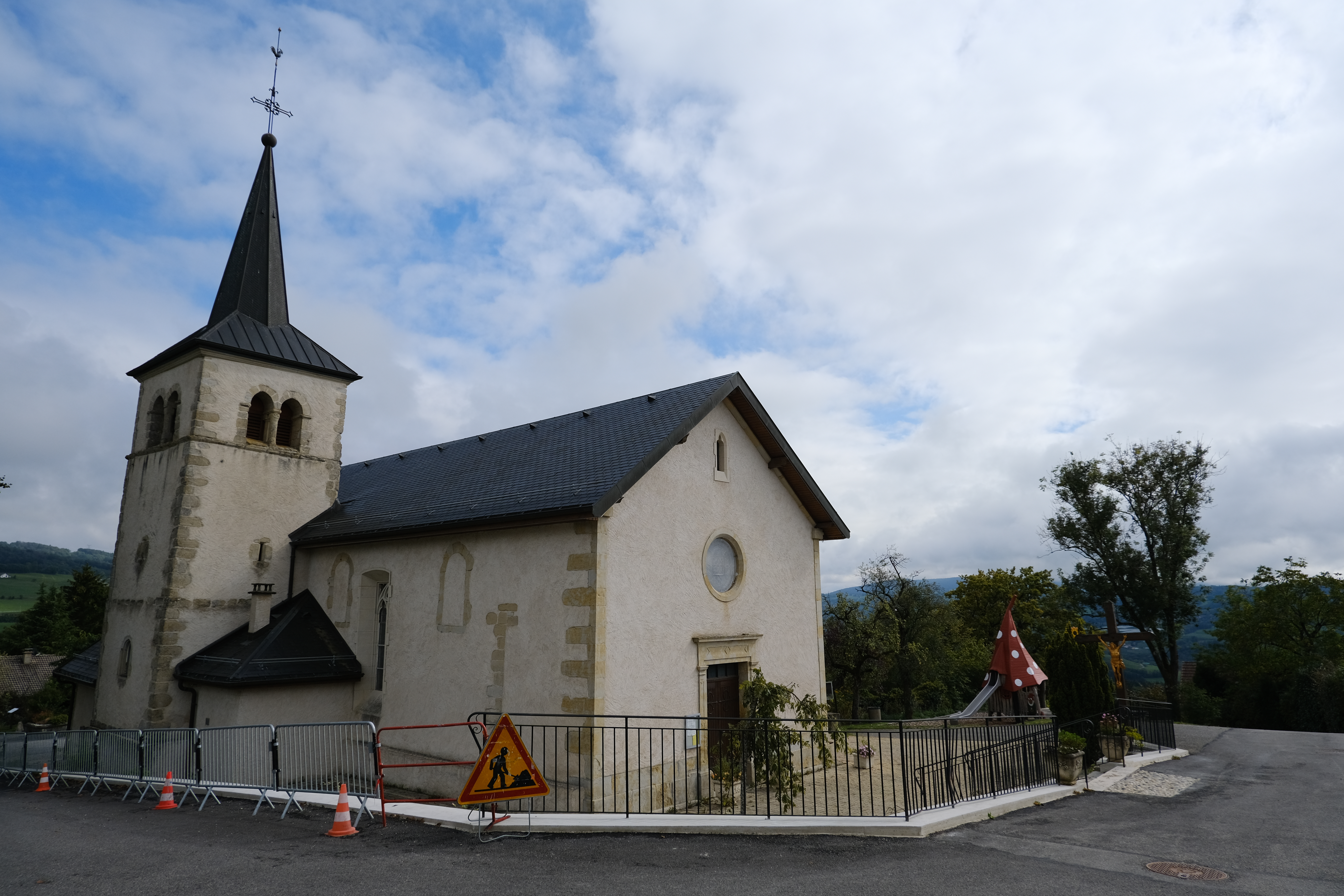
- Church of Saint-Symphorien

- Coat of arms
- Location of Andilly
- Location within France Location within Auvergne-Rhône-Alpes
- Coordinates: 46°04′12″N 6°04′12″E
- Country: France
- Region: Auvergne-Rhône-Alpes
- Department: Haute-Savoie
- Arrondissement: Saint-Julien-en-Genevois
- Canton: La Roche-sur-Foron
- Intercommunality: Pays de Cruseilles

Government
  - Mayor (2020–2026): Vincent Humbert
- Area^{1}: 6.07 km^{2} (2.34 sq mi)
- Elevation: 735 m (2,411 ft)
- Highest elevation: 857 m (2,812 ft)
- Lowest elevation: 577 m (1,893 ft)
- Population (2023): 1,013
  - Density: 167/km^{2} (432/sq mi)
- Time zone: UTC+01:00 (CET)
  - Summer (DST): UTC+02:00 (CEST)
- INSEE/Postal code: 74009 /74350
- ^{1} French Land Register data, which excludes lakes, ponds, glaciers > 1 km^{2} (0.386 sq mi or 247 acres) and river estuaries.

Andilly (French pronunciation: [ɑ̃diji]; Savoyard: Andlyi) is a commune in the Haute-Savoie department in the Auvergne-Rhône-Alpes region in south-eastern France.

== See also ==
- Communes of the Haute-Savoie department
