= Cuvat =

- Commune
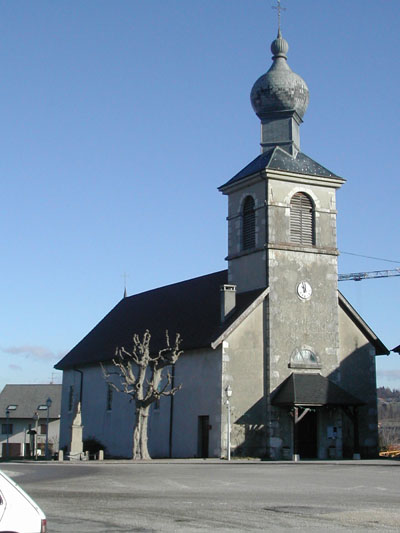
- The church in Cuvat
- Location of Cuvat
- Location within France Location within Auvergne-Rhône-Alpes
- Coordinates: 45°58′42″N 6°07′10″E
- Country: France
- Region: Auvergne-Rhône-Alpes
- Department: Haute-Savoie
- Arrondissement: Saint-Julien-en-Genevois
- Canton: La Roche-sur-Foron
- Intercommunality: CC Pays de Cruseilles

Government
  - Mayor (2020–2026): Julie Montcouquiol
- Area^{1}: 4.72 km^{2} (1.82 sq mi)
- Highest elevation: 902 m (2,959 ft)
- Lowest elevation: 540 m (1,770 ft)
- Population (2023): 1,665
  - Density: 353/km^{2} (914/sq mi)
- Time zone: UTC+01:00 (CET)
  - Summer (DST): UTC+02:00 (CEST)
- INSEE/Postal code: 74098 /74350
- Website: Cuvat.org
- ^{1} French Land Register data, which excludes lakes, ponds, glaciers > 1 km^{2} (0.386 sq mi or 247 acres) and river estuaries.

Cuvat (French pronunciation: [kyva]; Arpitan: Kva) is a commune in the Haute-Savoie department in the Auvergne-Rhône-Alpes region in south-eastern France.

== See also ==
- Communes of the Haute-Savoie department
