= A410 autoroute =

Road in France

A410 autoroute

Route information
- Part of E712
- Length: 25 km (16 mi)
- Existed: 1981–present

Major junctions
- West end: A 41

- East end: A 40

Location
- Country: France

Highway system
- Roads in France; Autoroutes; Routes nationales

The A410 autoroute is a short motorway in France. Running through the French Alps, the road runs from West to East connecting the A40 and A41 autoroutes. It has two lanes running in each direction.

== Junctions ==
- Exchange A40-A410
- 19 La Roche-sur-Foron
