= Saint-Blaise, Haute-Savoie =

Saint-Blaise San Blyé (Savoyard)
- Commune
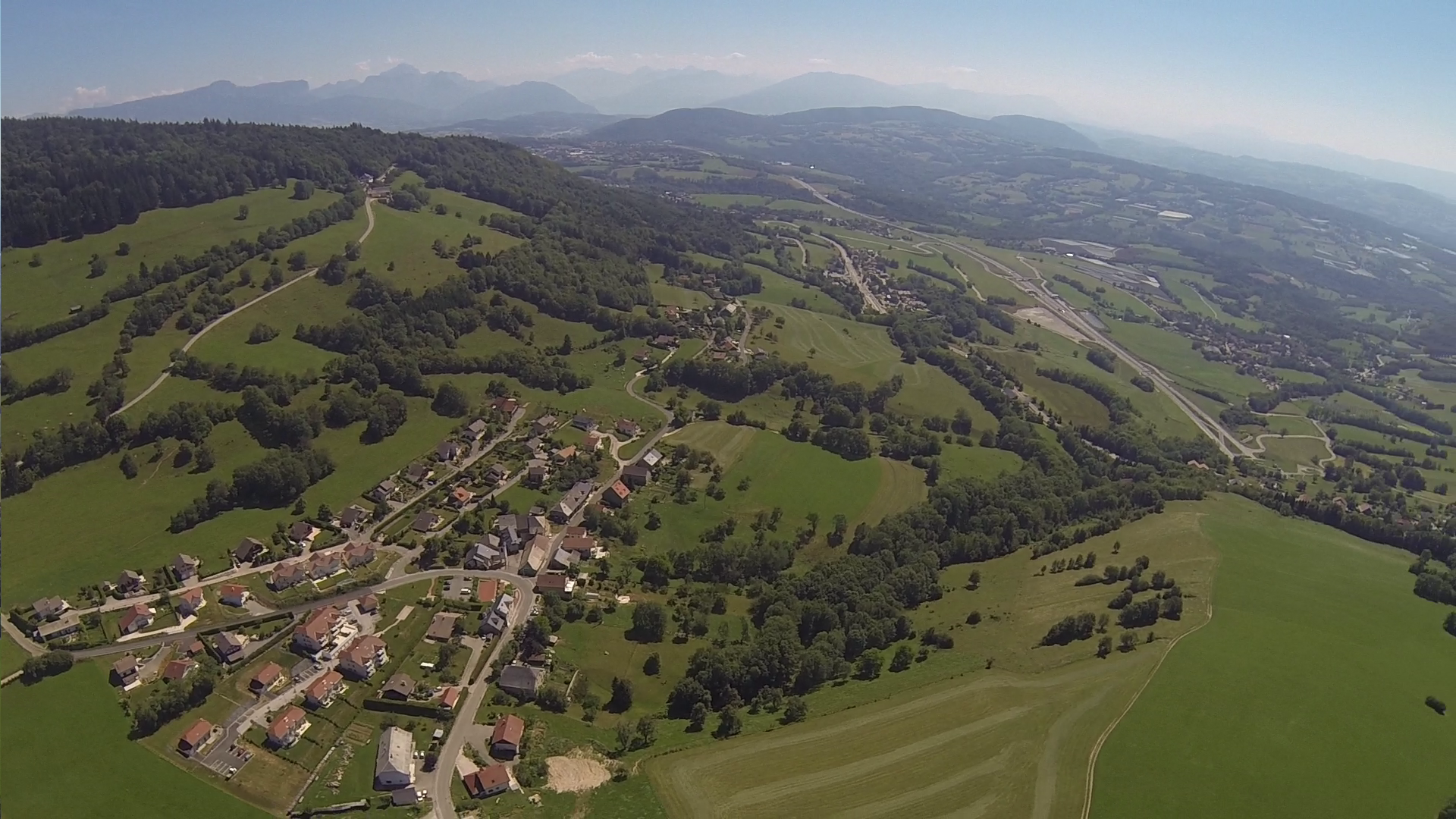
- An aerial view of Saint-Blaise
- Location of Saint-Blaise
- Location within France Location within Auvergne-Rhône-Alpes
- Coordinates: 46°03′58″N 6°05′22″E
- Country: France
- Region: Auvergne-Rhône-Alpes
- Department: Haute-Savoie
- Arrondissement: Saint-Julien-en-Genevois
- Canton: La Roche-sur-Foron
- Intercommunality: Pays de Cruseilles

Government
  - Mayor (2020–2026): Christine Megevand
- Area^{1}: 2.55 km^{2} (0.98 sq mi)
- Highest elevation: 1,188 m (3,898 ft)
- Lowest elevation: 760 m (2,490 ft)
- Population (2023): 383
  - Density: 150/km^{2} (389/sq mi)
- Time zone: UTC+01:00 (CET)
  - Summer (DST): UTC+02:00 (CEST)
- INSEE/Postal code: 74228 /74350
- ^{1} French Land Register data, which excludes lakes, ponds, glaciers > 1 km^{2} (0.386 sq mi or 247 acres) and river estuaries.

Saint-Blaise (French pronunciation: [sɛ̃ blɛz]; Savoyard: San Blyé) is a commune in the Haute-Savoie department in the Auvergne-Rhône-Alpes region in south-eastern France.

== See also ==
- Communes of the Haute-Savoie department
