= Le Sappey =

Le Sappey L Sapè (Savoyard)
- Commune
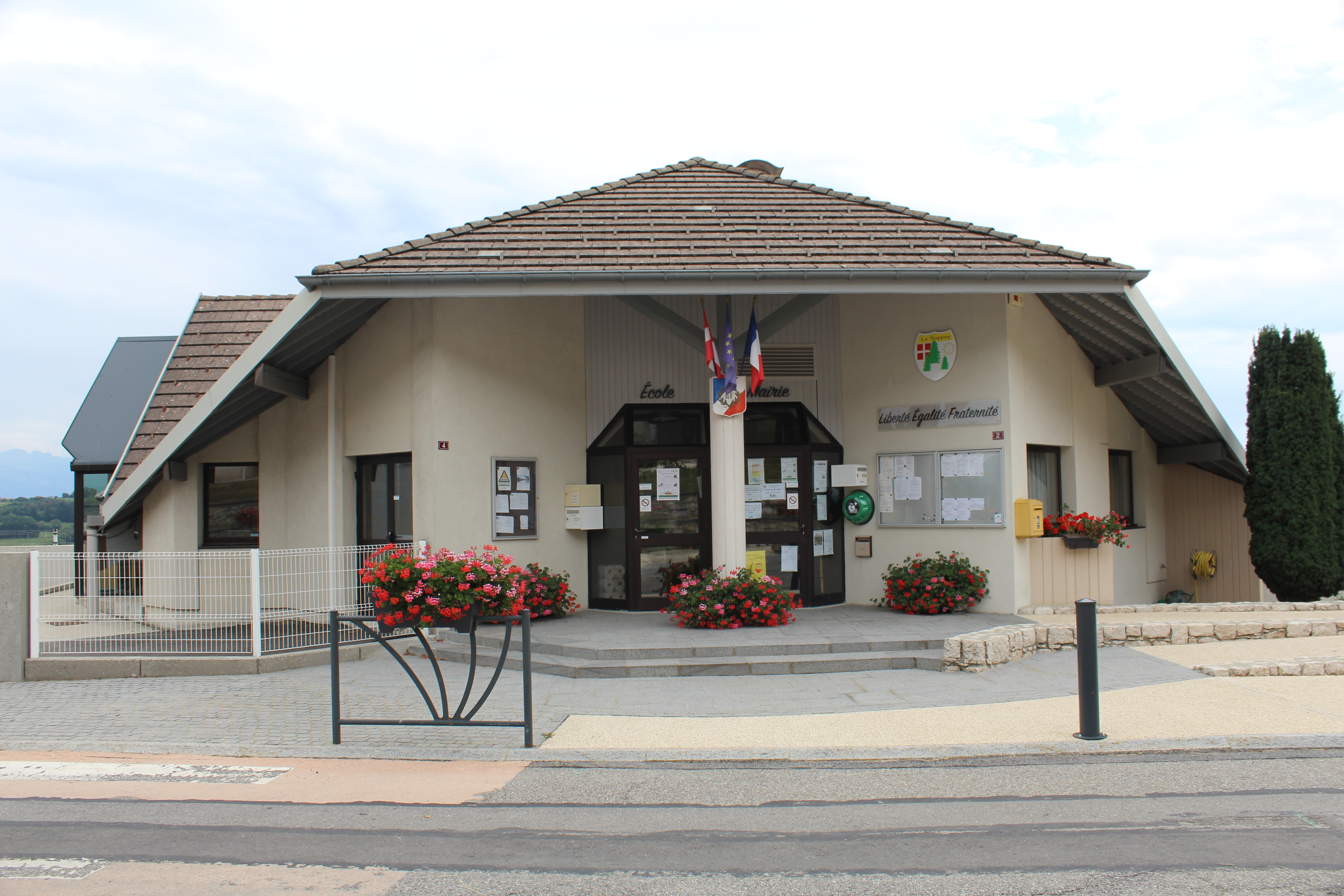
- Town hall

- Coat of arms
- Location of Le Sappey
- Location within France Location within Auvergne-Rhône-Alpes
- Coordinates: 46°05′22″N 6°10′00″E
- Country: France
- Region: Auvergne-Rhône-Alpes
- Department: Haute-Savoie
- Arrondissement: Saint-Julien-en-Genevois
- Canton: La Roche-sur-Foron
- Intercommunality: CC Pays de Cruseilles

Government
  - Mayor (2020–2026): Pierre Gal
- Area^{1}: 13.72 km^{2} (5.30 sq mi)
- Highest elevation: 1,340 m (4,400 ft)
- Lowest elevation: 710 m (2,330 ft)
- Population (2023): 468
  - Density: 34.1/km^{2} (88.3/sq mi)
- Time zone: UTC+01:00 (CET)
  - Summer (DST): UTC+02:00 (CEST)
- INSEE/Postal code: 74259 /74350
- ^{1} French Land Register data, which excludes lakes, ponds, glaciers > 1 km^{2} (0.386 sq mi or 247 acres) and river estuaries.

Le Sappey (French pronunciation: [lə sapɛ]; Savoyard: L Sapè) is a commune in the Haute-Savoie department in the Auvergne-Rhône-Alpes region in southeastern France.

== See also ==
- Communes of the Haute-Savoie department
