= Vovray-en-Bornes =

Vovray-en-Bornes Vovré-an-Beûrne (Savoyard)
- Commune
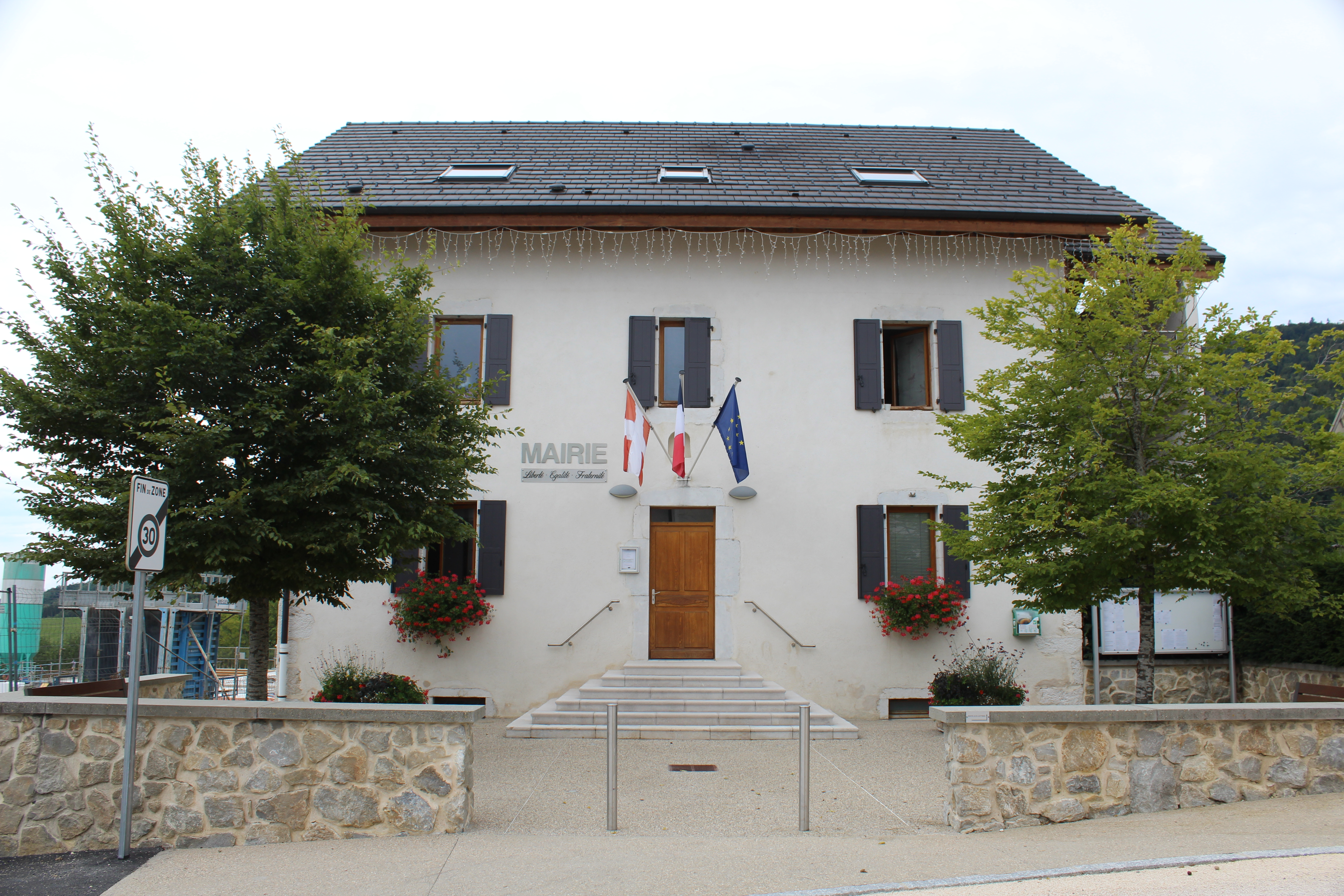
- Town hall

- Coat of arms
- Location of Vovray-en-Bornes
- Location within France Location within Auvergne-Rhône-Alpes
- Coordinates: 46°03′59″N 6°08′36″E
- Country: France
- Region: Auvergne-Rhône-Alpes
- Department: Haute-Savoie
- Arrondissement: Saint-Julien-en-Genevois
- Canton: La Roche-sur-Foron
- Intercommunality: Pays de Cruseilles

Government
  - Mayor (2020–2026): Xavier Brand
- Area^{1}: 6.57 km^{2} (2.54 sq mi)
- Highest elevation: 1,348 m (4,423 ft)
- Lowest elevation: 656 m (2,152 ft)
- Population (2023): 550
  - Density: 84/km^{2} (220/sq mi)
- Time zone: UTC+01:00 (CET)
  - Summer (DST): UTC+02:00 (CEST)
- INSEE/Postal code: 74313 /74350
- ^{1} French Land Register data, which excludes lakes, ponds, glaciers > 1 km^{2} (0.386 sq mi or 247 acres) and river estuaries.

Vovray-en-Bornes (French pronunciation: [vɔvʁɛ ɑ̃ bɔʁn]; Savoyard: Vovré-an-Beûrne) is a commune in the Haute-Savoie department in the Auvergne-Rhône-Alpes region in south-eastern France.

It sits on the eastern flank of Salève, near the river Usses. It is located on the D15 route, 25 km south of Geneva, 25 km north of Annecy and 20 km west of Bonneville.

This alpine community has 334 inhabitants, spread between Vovray itself and the hamlets of Rogin, la Mouille, Le Vernet, Le Château, Sallanjoux, plus the farmsteads of Body, Vardon, and Quétand.

The village is a centre of dairy farming, producing reblochon cheese through the Mont Salève de Cruseilles co-operative. Vovray also has two former silica quarries.

== See also ==
- Communes of the Haute-Savoie department
