= European route E713 =

Road in trans-European E-road network

E713

Route information
- Length: 92 km (57 mi)

Major junctions
- From: Valence
- To: Grenoble

Location
- Countries: France

Highway system
- International E-road network; A Class; B Class

European route E 713 is a European B class road in France, connecting the cities Valence — Grenoble.

== Route ==
- France
  - Valence
  - E711 Grenoble
