= Porte-de-Savoie =

- Commune
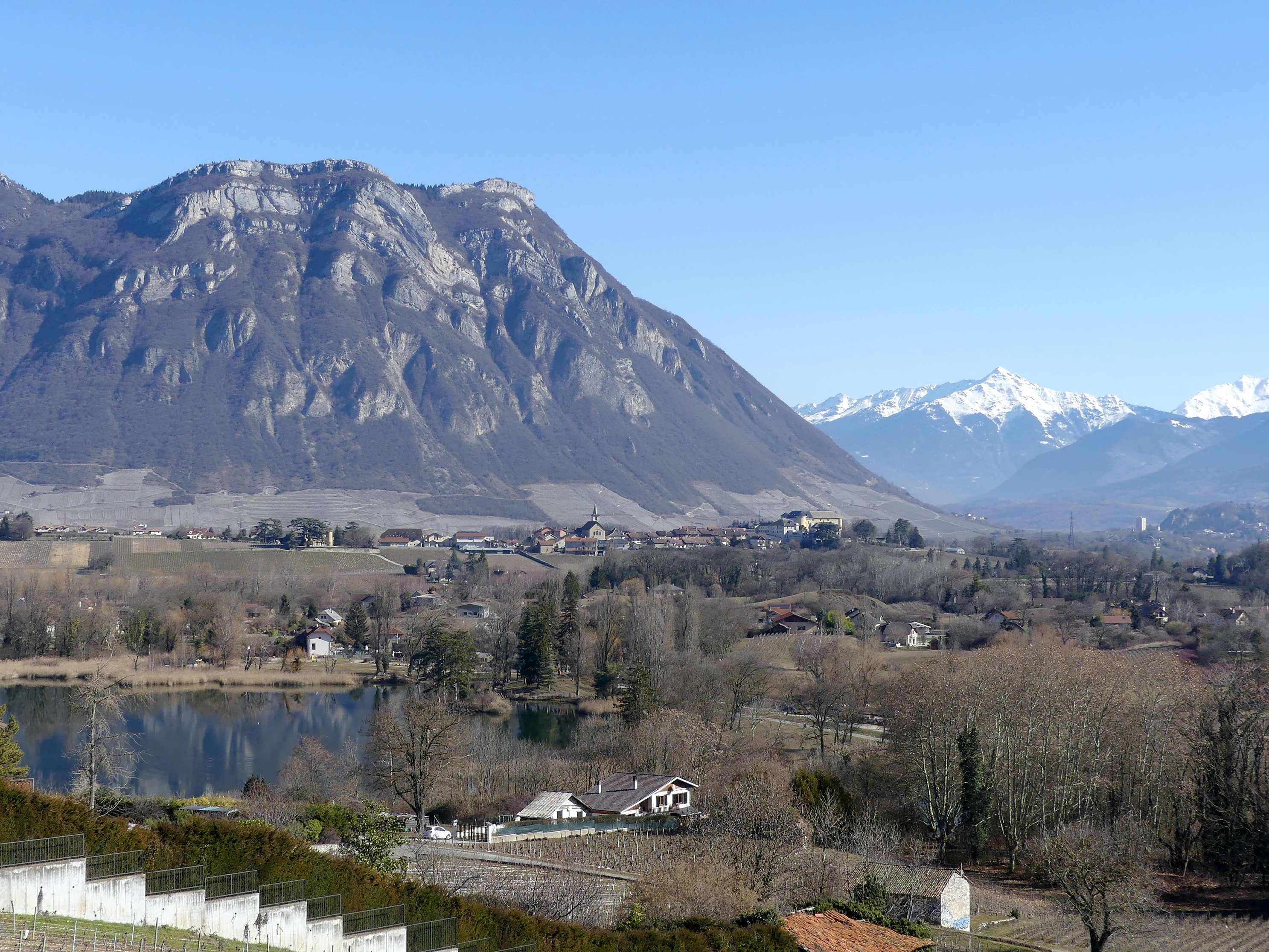
- Les Marches in winter
- Location of Porte-de-Savoie
- Location within France Location within Auvergne-Rhône-Alpes
- Coordinates: 45°30′00″N 6°00′06″E
- Country: France
- Region: Auvergne-Rhône-Alpes
- Department: Savoie
- Arrondissement: Chambéry
- Canton: Montmélian
- Intercommunality: Cœur de Savoie

Government
  - Mayor (2020–2026): Franck Villand
- Area^{1}: 22.28 km^{2} (8.60 sq mi)
- Highest elevation: 1,130 m (3,710 ft)
- Lowest elevation: 244 m (801 ft)
- Population (2023): 3,974
  - Density: 178.4/km^{2} (462.0/sq mi)
- Time zone: UTC+01:00 (CET)
  - Summer (DST): UTC+02:00 (CEST)
- INSEE/Postal code: 73151 /73800
- Dialling codes: 0479
- ^{1} French Land Register data, which excludes lakes, ponds, glaciers > 1 km^{2} (0.386 sq mi or 247 acres) and river estuaries.

Porte-de-Savoie (French pronunciation: [pɔʁt də savwa]; lit. 'Gate of Savoy') is a commune in the Savoie department in the Auvergne-Rhône-Alpes region in Southeastern France. It was established on 1 January 2019 by merger of the former communes of Les Marches (the seat) and Francin.

== Population ==
Population data refer to the area corresponding with the commune as of January 2025.

Historical population
Year	Pop.	±% p.a.
1968	1,417	—
1975	1,521	+1.02%
1982	1,800	+2.44%
1990	1,982	+1.21%
1999	2,821	+4.00%
2007	3,305	+2.00%
2012	3,379	+0.44%
2017	3,680	+1.72%
2023	3,974	+1.29%
Source: INSEE

== See also ==
- Communes of the Savoie department
