= Saint-Nazaire-en-Royans =

- Commune
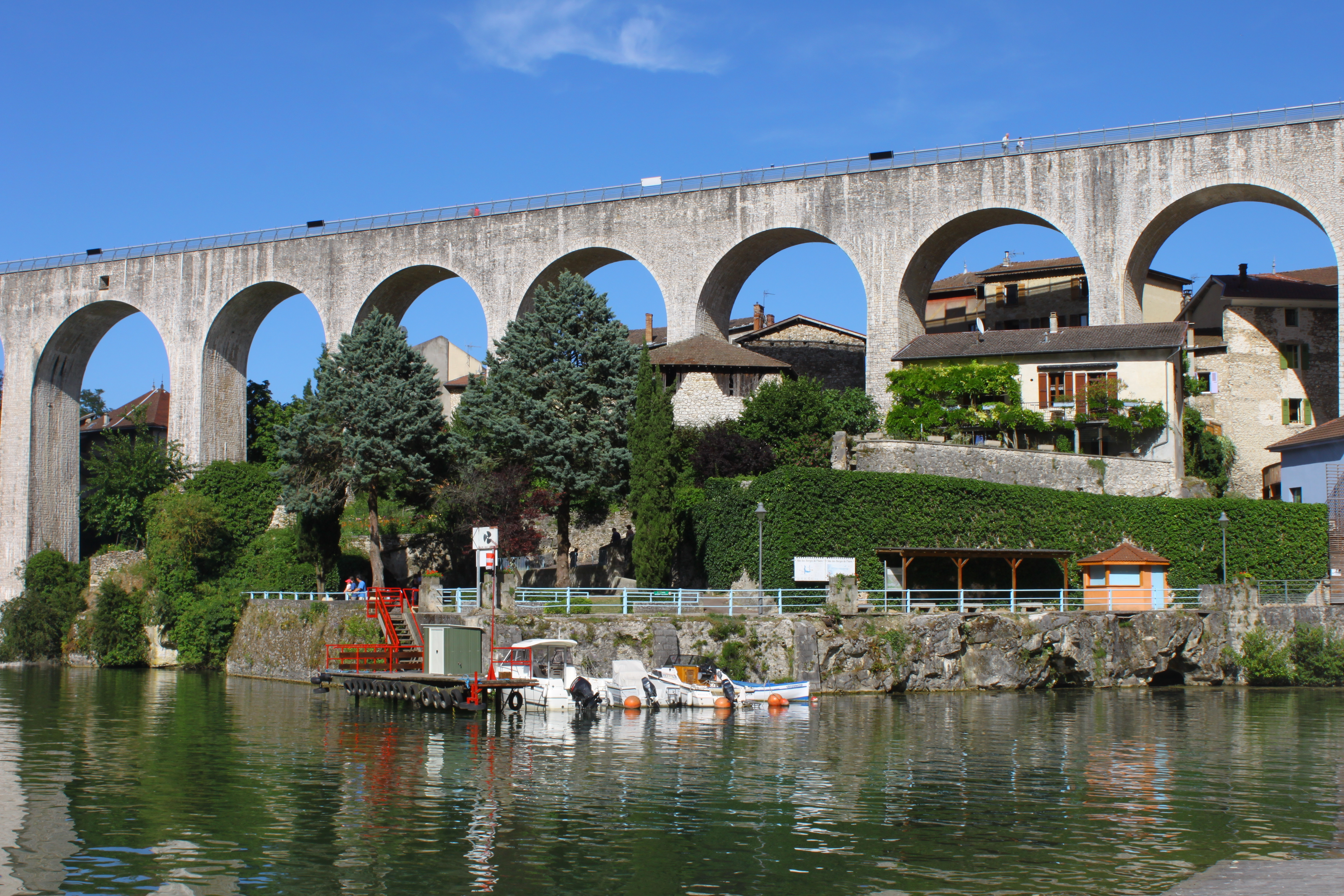
- The aqueduct in Saint-Nazaire-en-Royans

- Coat of arms
- Location of Saint-Nazaire-en-Royans
- Location within France Location within Auvergne-Rhône-Alpes
- Coordinates: 45°04′N 5°14′E
- Country: France
- Region: Auvergne-Rhône-Alpes
- Department: Drôme
- Arrondissement: Die
- Canton: Vercors-Monts du Matin

Government
  - Mayor (2020–2026): Rémi Saudax
- Area^{1}: 3.54 km^{2} (1.37 sq mi)
- Elevation: 182 m (597 ft)
- Highest elevation: 701 m (2,300 ft)
- Lowest elevation: 157 m (515 ft)
- Population (2023): 826
  - Density: 233/km^{2} (604/sq mi)
- Time zone: UTC+01:00 (CET)
  - Summer (DST): UTC+02:00 (CEST)
- INSEE/Postal code: 26320 /26190
- ^{1} French Land Register data, which excludes lakes, ponds, glaciers > 1 km^{2} (0.386 sq mi or 247 acres) and river estuaries.

Saint-Nazaire-en-Royans (French: [sɛ̃ nazɛːʁ ɑ̃ ʁwajɑ̃]; Occitan: Sant Nazari de Roians) is a commune in the Drôme department in southeastern France.

== Population ==
Historical population
Year	Pop.	±% p.a.
1968	590	—
1975	493	−2.53%
1982	576	+2.25%
1990	531	−1.01%
1999	498	−0.71%
2007	703	+4.40%
2012	816	+3.03%
2017	804	−0.30%
2023	826	+0.45%
Source: INSEE

== See also ==
- Communes of the Drôme department
- Parc naturel régional du Vercors
