= Copponex =

Copponex Koponé (Savoyard)
- Commune
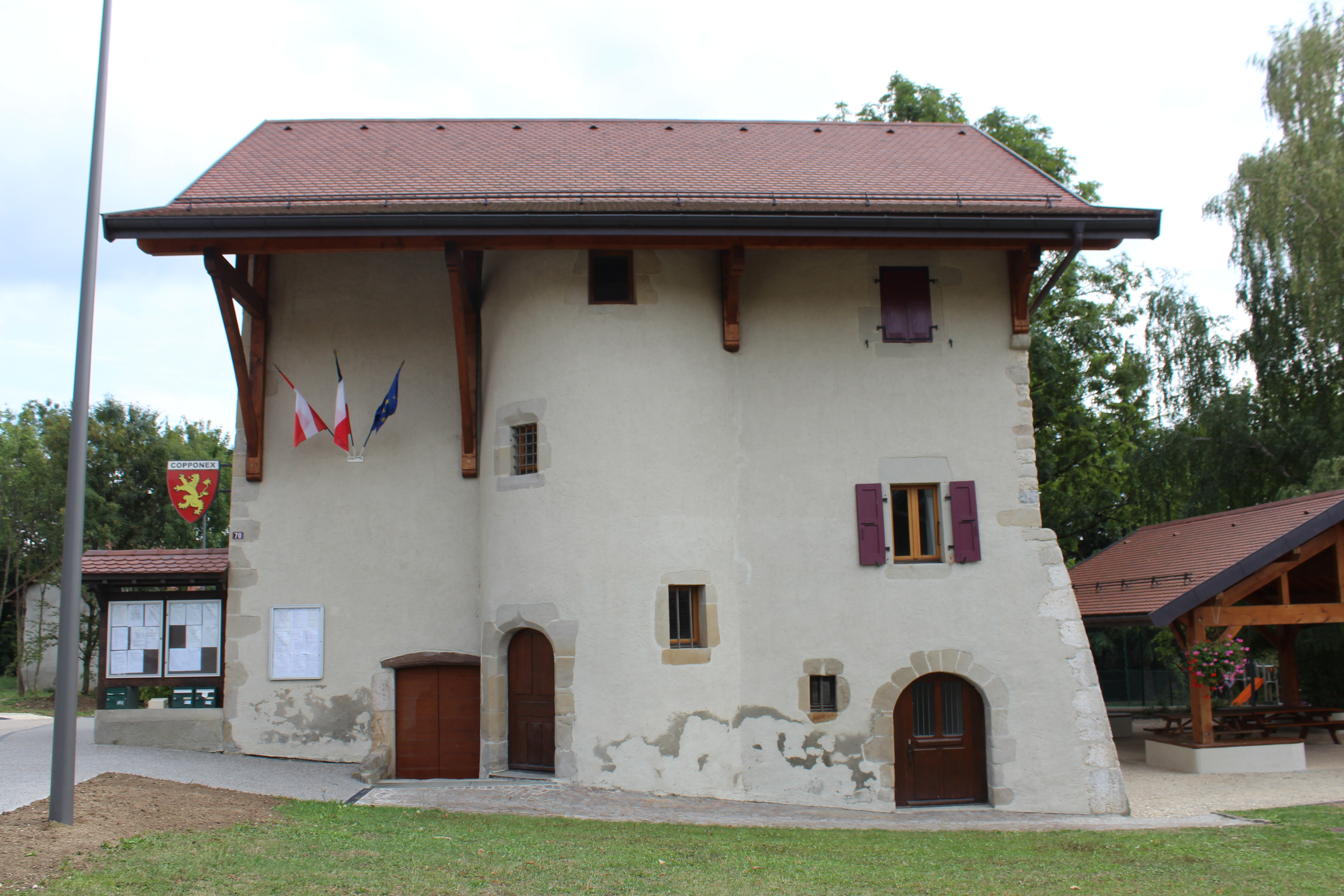
- Town hall

- Coat of arms
- Location of Copponex
- Location within France Location within Auvergne-Rhône-Alpes
- Coordinates: 46°03′05″N 6°04′28″E
- Country: France
- Region: Auvergne-Rhône-Alpes
- Department: Haute-Savoie
- Arrondissement: Saint-Julien-en-Genevois
- Canton: La Roche-sur-Foron
- Intercommunality: CC Pays de Cruseilles

Government
  - Mayor (2020–2026): Julian Martinez
- Area^{1}: 9.21 km^{2} (3.56 sq mi)
- Highest elevation: 1,010 m (3,310 ft)
- Lowest elevation: 415 m (1,362 ft)
- Population (2023): 1,340
  - Density: 145/km^{2} (377/sq mi)
- Time zone: UTC+01:00 (CET)
  - Summer (DST): UTC+02:00 (CEST)
- INSEE/Postal code: 74088 /74350
- Website: www.copponex.fr
- ^{1} French Land Register data, which excludes lakes, ponds, glaciers > 1 km^{2} (0.386 sq mi or 247 acres) and river estuaries.

Copponex (French pronunciation: [kɔpɔne]; Savoyard: Koponé) is a commune in the Haute-Savoie department in the Auvergne-Rhône-Alpes region in south-eastern France.

== Toponymy ==
As with many polysyllabic Arpitan toponyms or anthroponyms, the final -x marks oxytonic stress (on the last syllable), whereas the final -z indicates paroxytonic stress (on the penultimate syllable) and should not be pronounced, although in French it is often mispronounced due to hypercorrection.

== See also ==
- Communes of the Haute-Savoie department
