= Francin =

Francin Fransin (Savoyard)
- Part of Porte-de-Savoie
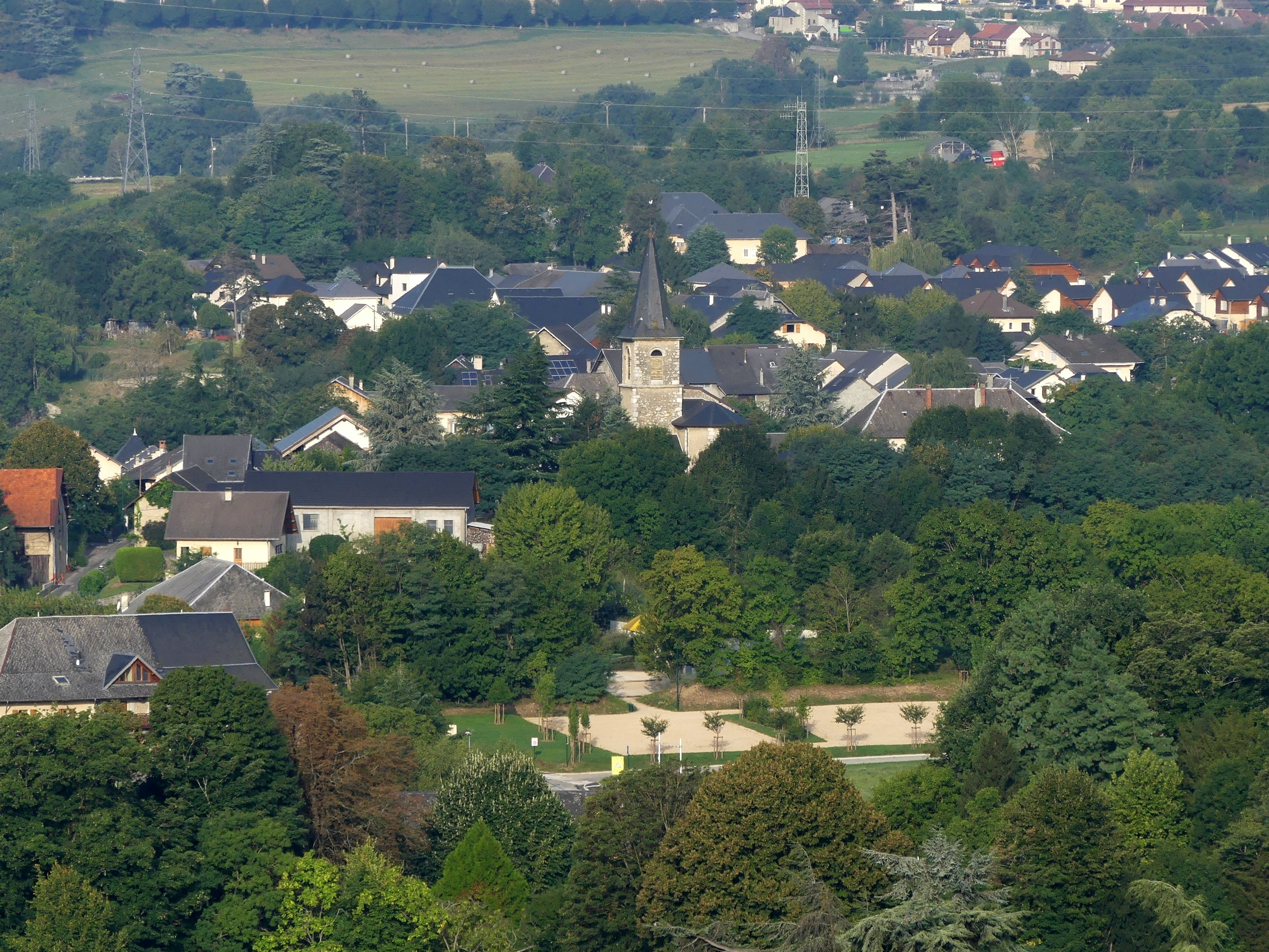
- General sight of the village from Montmélian
- Location of Francin
- Location within France Location within Auvergne-Rhône-Alpes
- Coordinates: 45°30′03″N 6°02′07″E
- Country: France
- Region: Auvergne-Rhône-Alpes
- Department: Savoie
- Arrondissement: Chambéry
- Canton: Montmélian
- Commune: Porte-de-Savoie
- Area^{1}: 6.93 km^{2} (2.68 sq mi)
- Elevation: 290 m (950 ft)
- Highest elevation: 1,130 m (3,710 ft)
- Lowest elevation: 248 m (814 ft)
- Population (2022): 1,153
  - Density: 166/km^{2} (431/sq mi)
- Time zone: UTC+01:00 (CET)
  - Summer (DST): UTC+02:00 (CEST)
- Postal code: 73800
- Dialling codes: 0479
- Website: www.commune-francin.com
- ^{1} French Land Register data, which excludes lakes, ponds, glaciers > 1 km^{2} (0.386 sq mi or 247 acres) and river estuaries.

Francin (French pronunciation: [fʁɑ̃sɛ̃]; Savoyard: Fransin) is a former commune in the Savoie department in the Auvergne-Rhône-Alpes region in south-eastern France. On 1 January 2019, it was merged into the new commune Porte-de-Savoie.

The Château de Carron is found here.

== See also ==
- Communes of the Savoie department
