= La Chapelle-Rambaud =

La Chapelle-Rambaud La Shapala (Savoyard)
- Commune
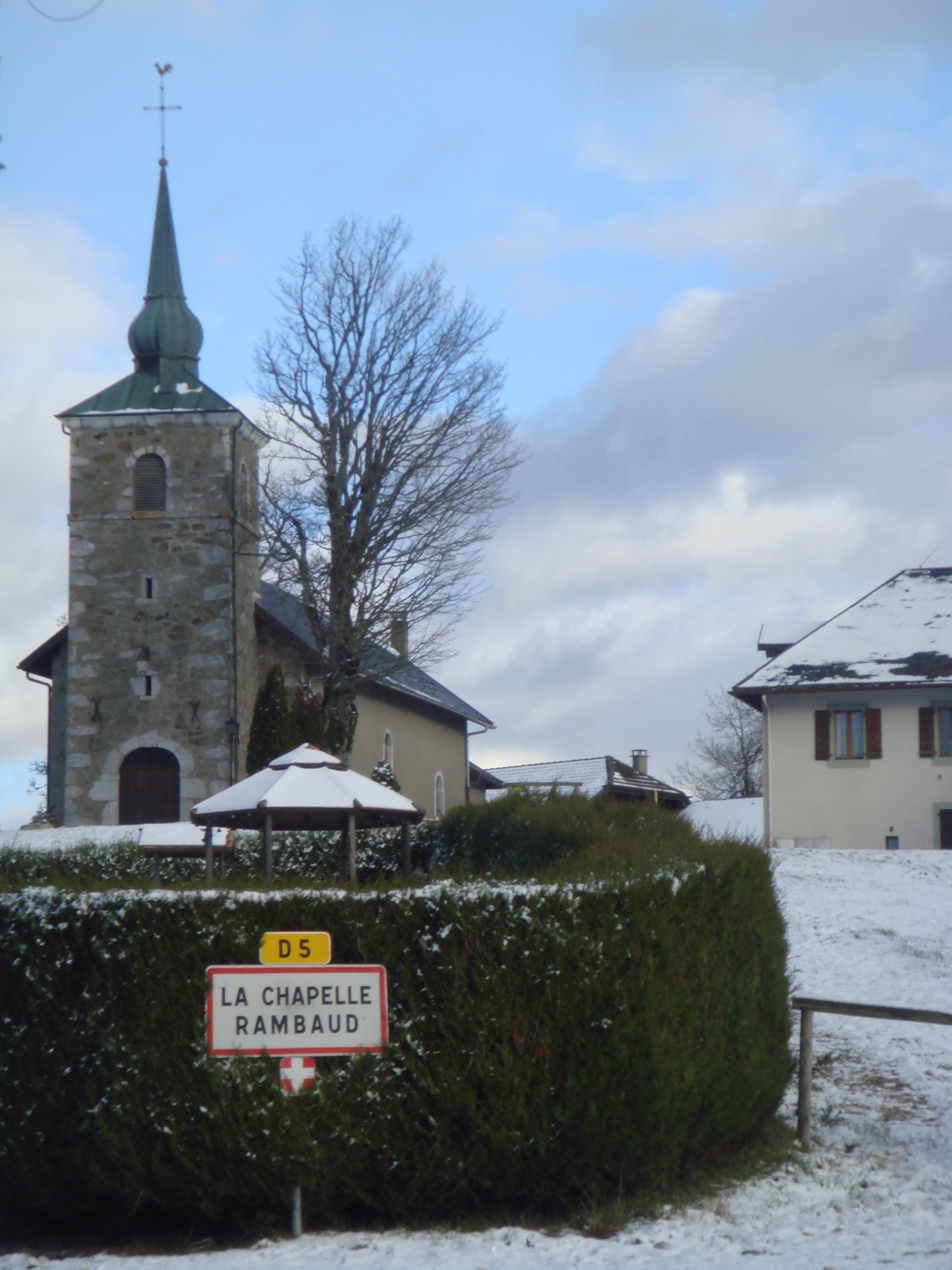
- The road into La Chapelle-Rambaud, from the west
- Location of La Chapelle-Rambaud
- Location within France Location within Auvergne-Rhône-Alpes
- Coordinates: 46°04′22″N 6°14′26″E
- Country: France
- Region: Auvergne-Rhône-Alpes
- Department: Haute-Savoie
- Arrondissement: Bonneville
- Canton: La Roche-sur-Foron
- Intercommunality: CC du Pays Rochois

Government
  - Mayor (2020–2026): Matthieu Bach
- Area^{1}: 4.27 km^{2} (1.65 sq mi)
- Highest elevation: 957 m (3,140 ft)
- Lowest elevation: 800 m (2,600 ft)
- Population (2023): 249
  - Density: 58.3/km^{2} (151/sq mi)
- Time zone: UTC+01:00 (CET)
  - Summer (DST): UTC+02:00 (CEST)
- INSEE/Postal code: 74059 /74800
- ^{1} French Land Register data, which excludes lakes, ponds, glaciers > 1 km^{2} (0.386 sq mi or 247 acres) and river estuaries.

La Chapelle-Rambaud (French pronunciation: [la ʃapɛl ʁɑ̃bo]; Savoyard: La Shapala) is a commune in the Haute-Savoie department and Auvergne-Rhône-Alpes region of eastern France.

== See also ==
- Communes of the Haute-Savoie department
