= Villy-le-Pelloux =

- Commune
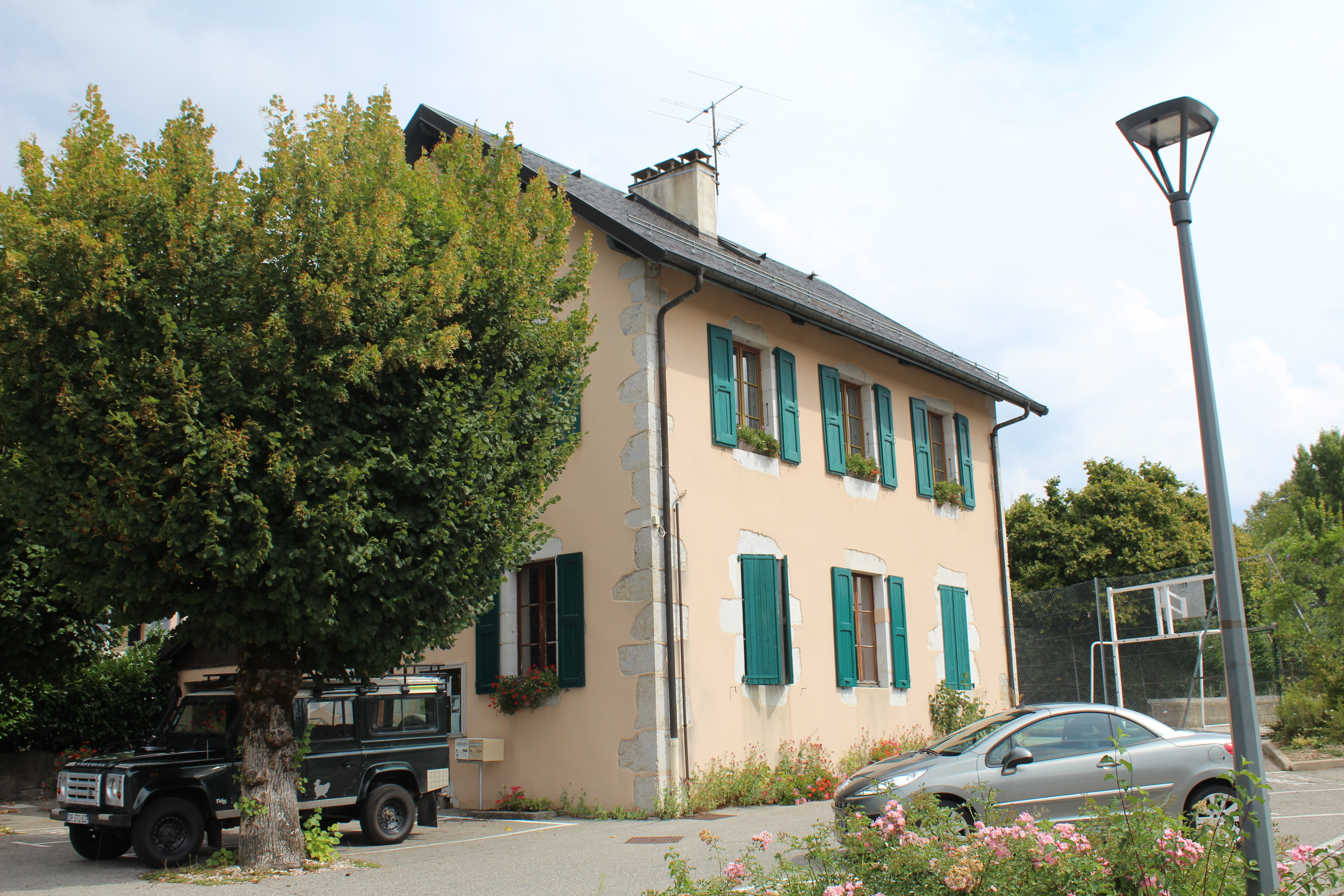
- Town hall

- Coat of arms
- Location of Villy-le-Pelloux
- Location within France Location within Auvergne-Rhône-Alpes
- Coordinates: 46°00′04″N 6°08′01″E
- Country: France
- Region: Auvergne-Rhône-Alpes
- Department: Haute-Savoie
- Arrondissement: Saint-Julien-en-Genevois
- Canton: La Roche-sur-Foron
- Intercommunality: CC Pays de Cruseilles

Government
  - Mayor (2020–2026): Charlotte Boettner
- Area^{1}: 2.97 km^{2} (1.15 sq mi)
- Elevation: 710 m (2,330 ft)
- Highest elevation: 754 m (2,474 ft)
- Lowest elevation: 562 m (1,844 ft)
- Population (2023): 1,062
  - Density: 358/km^{2} (926/sq mi)
- Time zone: UTC+01:00 (CET)
  - Summer (DST): UTC+02:00 (CEST)
- INSEE/Postal code: 74307 /74350
- ^{1} French Land Register data, which excludes lakes, ponds, glaciers > 1 km^{2} (0.386 sq mi or 247 acres) and river estuaries.

Villy-le-Pelloux is a commune in the Haute-Savoie department in the Auvergne-Rhône-Alpes region in south-eastern France.

== See also ==
- Communes of the Haute-Savoie department
