= Valgelon-La Rochette =

- Commune
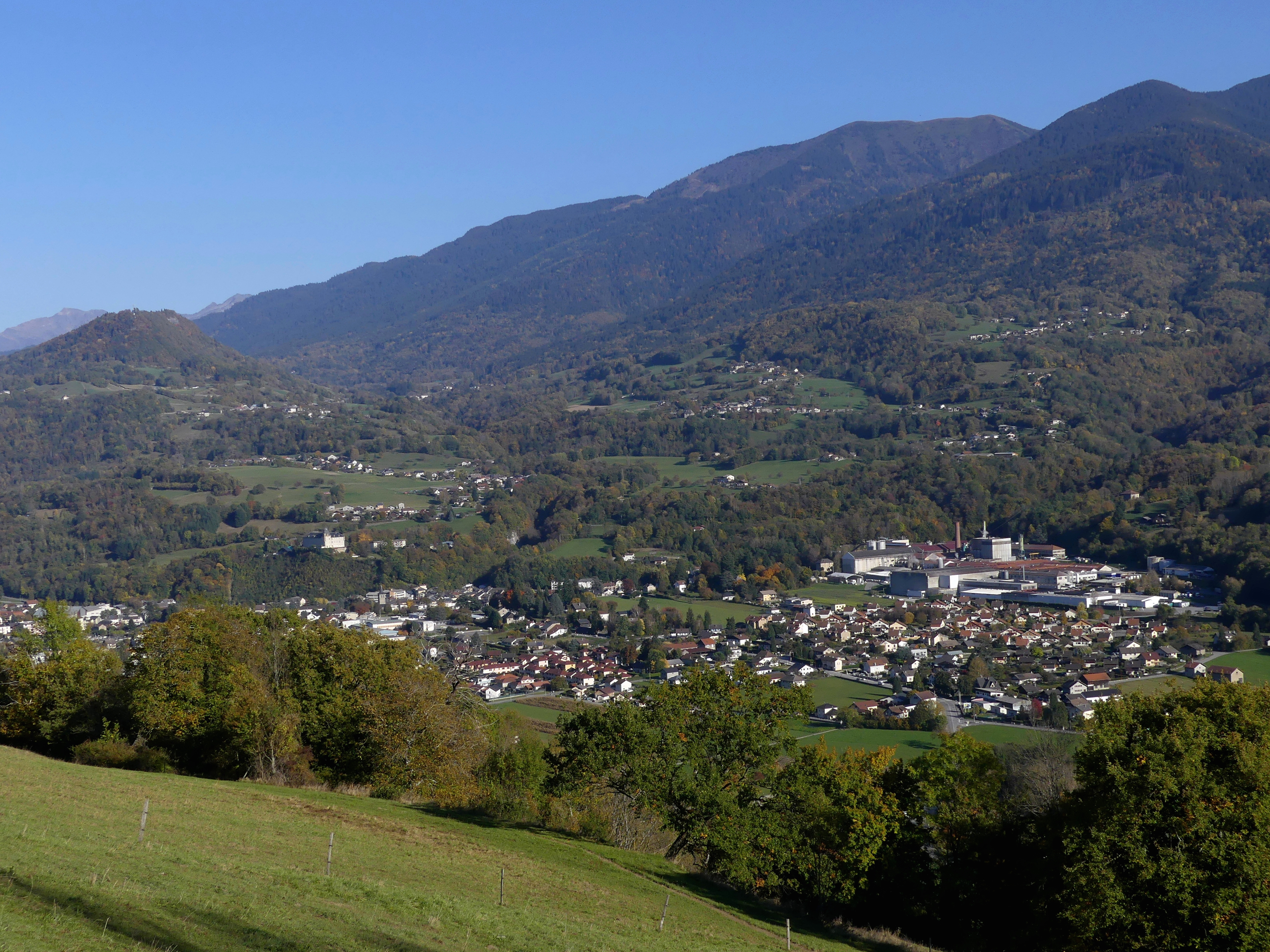
- Location of Valgelon-La Rochette
- Location within France Location within Auvergne-Rhône-Alpes
- Coordinates: 45°27′34″N 6°07′16″E
- Country: France
- Region: Auvergne-Rhône-Alpes
- Department: Savoie
- Arrondissement: Chambéry
- Canton: Montmélian
- Intercommunality: Cœur de Savoie

Government
  - Mayor (2021–2026): David Ates
- Area^{1}: 7.36 km^{2} (2.84 sq mi)
- Highest elevation: 860 m (2,820 ft)
- Lowest elevation: 322 m (1,056 ft)
- Population (2023): 4,207
  - Density: 572/km^{2} (1,480/sq mi)
- Time zone: UTC+01:00 (CET)
  - Summer (DST): UTC+02:00 (CEST)
- INSEE/Postal code: 73215 /73110
- ^{1} French Land Register data, which excludes lakes, ponds, glaciers > 1 km^{2} (0.386 sq mi or 247 acres) and river estuaries.

Valgelon-La Rochette (French pronunciation: [valʒəlɔ̃ la ʁɔʃɛt]) is a commune in the southeastern French department of Savoie. It was established on 1 January 2019 by merger of the former communes of La Rochette (the seat) and Étable.

== Population ==
Population data refer to the area corresponding with the commune as of January 2025.

Historical population
Year	Pop.	±% p.a.
1968	3,140	—
1975	3,309	+0.75%
1982	3,421	+0.48%
1990	3,393	−0.10%
1999	3,387	−0.02%
2007	3,601	+0.77%
2012	3,931	+1.77%
2017	4,111	+0.90%
2023	4,207	+0.39%
Source: INSEE

== See also ==
- Communes of the Savoie department
