= A430 autoroute =

Road in France

A430 autoroute

Route information
- Maintained by AREA
- Length: 15 km (9.3 mi)
- Existed: 1991–present

Major junctions
- West end: E70 / A 43 in Aiton

- East end: N 90 in Gilly-sur-Isère

Location
- Country: France

Highway system
- Roads in France; Autoroutes; Routes nationales

The A430 autoroute is a short motorway in France. At just 15 km, the road is a short spur which connects the A43 autoroute to Albertville. The A430 follows the N90 along the Isère river valley until the two merge just outside Albertville whereby the N90 continues as a dual carriageway to Moûtiers.

== Characteristics ==
- Length: 15 km
- Toll road
- 2×2 lanes

== List of exits and junctions ==
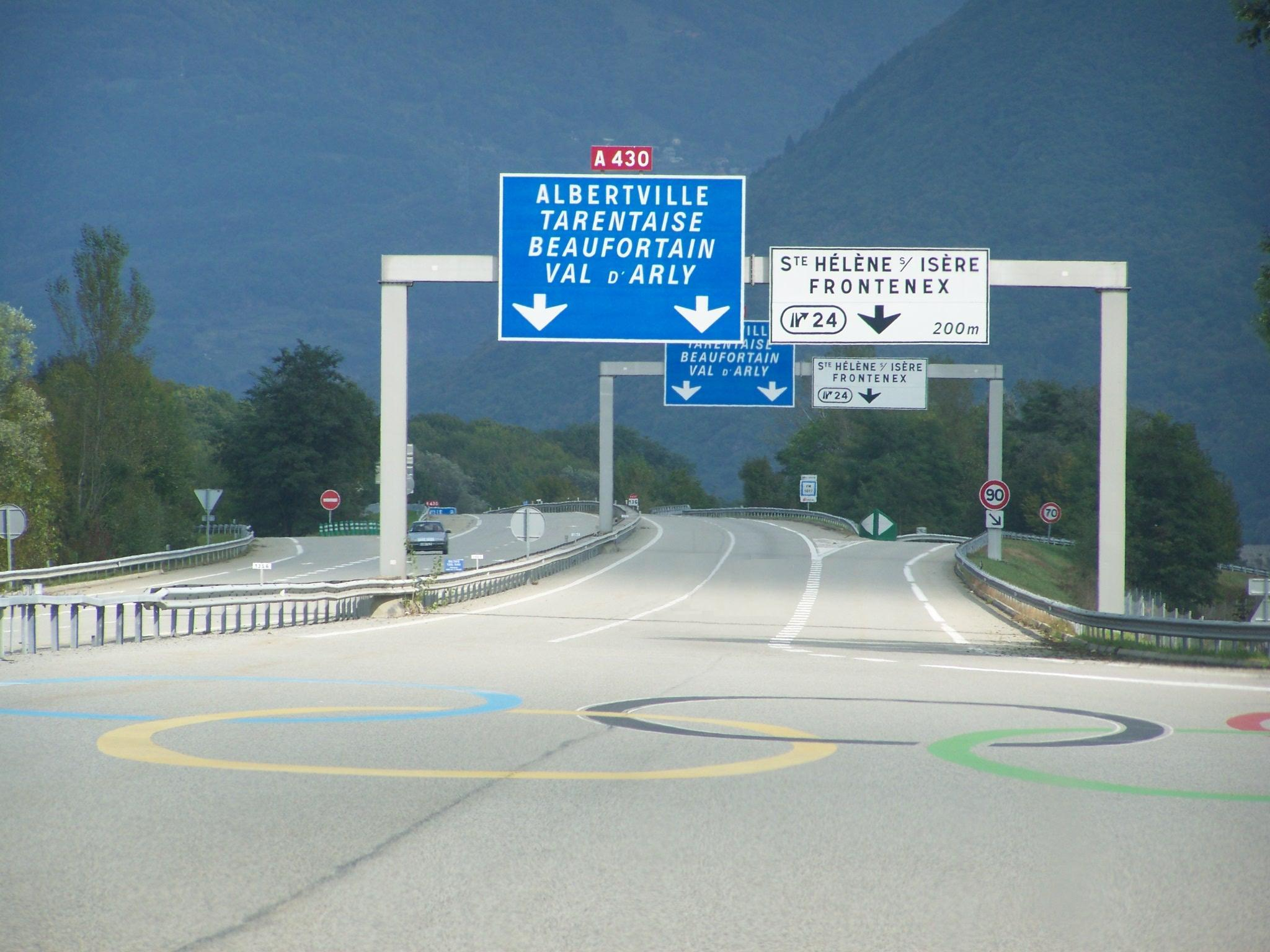
The Olympic rings denoting the approach to the location of the 1992 Winter Games

Region	Department	km	mi	Junctions	Destinations	Notes
Auvergne-Rhône-Alpes	Savoie	0,0	0.0	A43 - A430	Grenoble, Lyon, Chambéry; Turin, Milan (Tunnel du Fréjus), Maurienne, Saint-Jean-de-Maurienne	
Auvergne-Rhône-Alpes	Savoie	Péage de Sainte-Hélène-sur-Isère				
Auvergne-Rhône-Alpes	Savoie	10	6.21	24 : Sainte-Hélène-sur-Isère	Sainte-Hélène-sur-Isère, Frontenex	Exit and entry from A43
A 430 becomes N 90
1.000 mi = 1.609 km; 1.000 km = 0.621 mi
