= European route E711 =

Road in trans-European E-road network

E711

Route information
- Length: 111 km (69 mi)

Major junctions
- From: Lyon
- To: Grenoble

Location
- Countries: France

Highway system
- International E-road network; A Class; B Class

European route E 711 is a European B class road in France, connecting the cities Lyon — Grenoble.

== Route ==
- France
  - E15, E70, E611 Lyon
  - E712 Grenoble
