= House of Faucigny =

Noble family

Faucigny
- Family coat of arms.
- Origin: County of Geneva; County of Savoy
- Seat: Faucigny, Châtillon, Flumet, Beaufort
- Members: County of Savoy; Kingdom of France
- Connected families: Faucigny-Châtillon de Faucigny-Lucinge; Grésy (Greysier) de Faucigny Lucinge, Vevey branch de Faucigny Lucinge, Marlioz branch
- Distinctions: Ecclesiastical offices: Bishop of Geneva; 22nd Bishop of Saint-Jean-de-Maurienne; 21st Bishop of Lausanne

The House of Faucigny is a high-ranking noble family, documented since the 11th century and named after a castle located in the Arve Valley. Probably vassals of the Counts of Geneva, the lords of Faucigny held territories in the Arve Valley and the Beaufortain region. The main line of the family became extinct in the 13th century, following alliances with the House of Savoy and the Dauphins of Viennois from the House of Albon.

The senior branch of the House of Faucigny became extinct in the 13th century. A cadet branch, known as Lucinge, separated in the 12th century and adopted the name Faucigny-Lucinge in the second half of the 18th century. Following the annexation of Savoy by France in 1860, this branch has been included among the surviving families of the French nobility.

== Heraldry ==

The arms of the de Faucigny family are blazoned as follows:

Paly of six Or and Gules.

According to Amédée de Foras, the paly design of gold and red vertical stripes became prominent when the House of Savoy incorporated it into its alliance coat of arms in the second half of the 13th century. Before this, the seals of Bishop Guy of Faucigny displayed three pales rather than a paly design, while the seal of Aymon II featured three pales accompanied by billets. Other seals showed variations, including two pales.

== Origins ==
The origins of the Lords of Faucigny are considered poorly documented or obscure, comparable to those of the neighboring and rival families, the Counts of Savoy and the Counts of Geneva. The genealogy of the Faucigny family is known to historians primarily through two documents dating from the late 11th and early 12th centuries. Earlier lineage remains a subject of scholarly debate.

=== Earliest records ===
The earliest known members of the House of Faucigny appear in two documents dated 1083 and 1119. The 1083 document records the donation of the priory of Contamine-sur-Arve by Guy of Faucigny, Bishop of Geneva, to the Abbey of Cluny. Considered the founding charter of the priory, this document was first published in 1862 by Swiss historian Frédéric Charles Jean Gingins de la Sarraz and later included in the Régeste genevois (1866). It contains the earliest known references to the Faucigny family.

…fratribus meis domno Wuillelmo et domno Amedeo […] specialiter avi nostri bonae Aimarardi et patris nostri Ludiovici, atque Widonis, Giserberti, Ottonis, Vilentii, avunculorum nostrorum, […] Huis rei testes Vuillelmus et Amadeus, eiusdem episcopi fratres.

... I give, my brothers consenting, for the good of their souls and mine and for the relief of our grandfather Emerard, our father Louis, our uncles Guy, Gisebert, Otton, Vilence and other grandfathers or successors.

— (February 1, 1083) Cartulaire de Cluny, côte B, p. 19

The document lists the family members of Bishop Guy of Geneva (S. Widonis episcopi genevensis), including his grandfather Aimerard (also recorded as Eimerard or Emerard), his father Louis (Ludiovici), and his uncles Guy, Giselbert (Gisebert), Otton, and Willelme (Vilence), all noted as deceased. His brothers Willelme (Guillaume, Wuillelmo) and Amédée (Amedeo) are named as witnesses. The priory of Contamine later became the burial site of the Faucigny family. A confirmation of the donation, issued in 1119, included an expanded genealogy:

…patris mei Ludovici et avi mei Ermenradi et Guillelmi fratris mei et filiorum eius Rodulfi, Ludoici, Raimundi et episcorum Geraldi Lausannensi et Amadei Morianensis nepotum meorum et matris eorum Utilie et matrie mee Teberge...

…of my father Louis and my grandfather Ermenrad, and of my brother William and his sons Rodulf, Louis, Raymond, and the bishops Gerald of Lausanne and Amadeus of Maurienne, my nephews, and their mother Utilia and my mother Tetberge…

— (2 September 1119) Cluny V 3940

The 1119 document identifies Raoul (or Rodolphe) of Faucigny (Rodulphus de Fulciniaco), nephew of Bishop Guy, as holding the lordship and castle of Faucigny. It also mentions his mother, Tetberge; his brother Willelme (Guillaume); and Willelme's wife, Utilia, along with their children: Rodolphe, Louis, Reymond, Gérard (also referred to as Gérold), who would become Bishop of Lausanne, and Amédée, future Bishop of Maurienne.

Peter the Venerable, Abbot of Cluny, described Bishop Guy and his family as being of high nobility (magne [...] nobilitatis). In his De Miraculis, the abbot commented on the bishop's behavior about his noble status, stating: "He was of high nobility according to the standards of the time and, because of that, led a life far more dissolute than would have been fitting for a bishop" (Fuit hic magne secundum seculum nobilitatis, et ideo multo plus quam episcopum decuisset uite dissolutioris).

=== Hypotheses in the 17th century ===
In Histoire généalogique de la Royale Maison de Savoie (1660), genealogist Samuel Guichenon presents a genealogy based on a legal document that traces the lineage from Emerard (Aimerard) to Marguerite, also known as Béatrice or Béatrix de Faucigny, who married Count Thomas I of Savoy around 1196. However, Guichenon does not offer a hypothesis regarding the origin of the Faucigny family. Around the same period, Dom Hilaire Leyat, (Note: Hilaire de Saint-Jean-Baptiste, known as Dom Hilaire Leyat or Layat, was claustral prior of Abondance and a historian.) in Tableau généalogique de la maison de Faucigny (1679), proposes two hypotheses. He identifies Emerard as the individual mentioned in a charter from the archives of the Abbey of Saint-Maurice, documenting a land donation in the early 11th century. Alongside his wife, Aalgirt (or Aalgert), Emerard is said to have received property from Abbot Burchard I, half-brother of King Rudolph III of Burgundy, in exchange for lands in the Chablais region. Based on this, Dom Hilaire Leyat suggests that “Emmérard de Foucigni commanded this region, whether his ancestors had already held lordship under the kings of Burgundy, Germany, and Arles, or whether he had been appointed governor by Rudolph III (993–1032) at the beginning of his reign.”

=== Hypotheses in the 19th century ===
Jean-Louis Grillet (1756–1812), in the entry on the "Sovereign House of the Barons of Faucigny" from his Dictionnaire historique, littéraire et statistique des départements du Mont-Blanc et du Léman (1807), does not propose a theory regarding the family's origin. Concerning Emmerard, he states that "his origin is unknown; it is only known that he was the father of Louis." He nonetheless asserts that Emmerard paid homage to Emperor Conrad II, who had inherited the rights of the kings of Burgundy. Swiss historian Édouard Mallet (1805–1856), in his article On Bishop Guy of Faucigny and the Charters Concerning Him, suggests that the Faucigny lineage emerged during the succession crisis in Burgundy (1032–1034). He identifies Ermérard as the earliest known ancestor of the House of Faucigny, viewing the family as one of several dynasties of local lords that, following the end of the Second Kingdom of Burgundy and its transition to the contested and remote suzerainty of the Holy Roman Emperors, became effectively independent and exercised sovereign rights.

Following the work of Dom Hilaire Leyat, several regional historians—including Frédéric Charles Jean Gingins de la Sarraz (1790–1863), Prosper Ménabréa (1804–1857), and Joseph Lavorel (1846–1926)—adopted the theory of a local origin for the House of Faucigny.

Genealogist Amédée de Foras, while acknowledging in his introduction that the family's origin “is lost in the mists of time,” supports the hypothesis that the family emerged during the decline of the Burgundian kings, and that they became “the most important lords in the province bearing that name” (Faucigny).

Abbot Marie Rannaud (1841–19..), a member of the Académie salésienne and the Académie chablaisienne, proposes in his Vita of Ponce de Faucigny that Aimerard was the son of Sigefroy (968–1002), a high-ranking ecclesiastical figure from the Diocese of Arles, who held the titles of "gonfalonier of the Holy Roman Church" and "prefect of the apostolic praetorium in the kingdoms of Arles and Burgundy."

Ferdinand de Faucigny-Lucinge (1868–1928), a member of the family, asserted that the lords of Faucigny shared a common origin with the Féterne family and were descended from the "viscounts of Savoy," themselves purportedly descendants of Emperor Louis the Blind. He claimed that Aymerard, the first known lord of Faucigny, was the brother of Louis, lord of Féterne, both sons of Guy of Féterne, who was in turn the son of Guiffred, the first viscount of Savoy and a son of Emperor Louis the Blind, King of Provence, allegedly descended from Saint Engelbert and the kings of Kent. Pierre de Viry, in his continuation of the Armorial et nobiliaire de l’ancien duché de Savoie by Count Amédée de Foras, critically assessed this claim in 1914, noting that the genealogical connections presented by Ferdinand de Faucigny-Lucinge are not supported by verifiable evidence.

=== Contemporary hypotheses ===
Medievalist Jean-Yves Mariotte (1980) questions the proposed origin of the House of Faucigny, suggesting alternative hypotheses such as descent from a family of Carolingian dignitaries or from local rulers who rose to prominence independently. He nonetheless favors, as did Dom Hilaire Leyat in the 17th century, the idea of an affiliation—likely as vassals—with the House of Geneva.

Medievalists Nicolas Carrier and Matthieu de La Corbière (2001, 2005) also identify the Faucigny as feudatories of the Counts of Geneva but reject the notion that the family derived from a cadet branch of a more prominent lineage. They note that the Faucigny were related to the Geneva dynasty from the mid-11th century onward.

=== Lord or baron? ===
Several authors, including Hilaire de Saint-Jean-Baptiste (1679), Jean-Louis Grillet (1807), Lullin and Le Fort (1866), Victor Flour de Saint-Genis (1868), and Alfred Dufour (2014), have referred to the lords of Faucigny as "barons." However, historian Jean-Yves Mariotte (1981), following earlier observations by Prosper Ménabréa (1854), notes that the title "baron," often used by modern historians, does not appear in any known documents from the early Middle Ages. Contemporary sources refer to them using the titles dominus or domini. In regional historiography, they are typically designated as sires de Faucigny.

The term baronnie de Faucigny appears in historical records beginning in 1256. Before this, from the 12th century onward, the lords of Faucigny seem to have exercised authority through a "princely organization," which included administrative officers such as a seneschal and a marshal. The precise territorial extent of their domain remains unclear. Historians Nicolas Carrier and Matthieu de La Corbière note that the lords of Faucigny served as avoués (protectors) of the priory of Contamine-sur-Arve between 1083 and 1119, and of the priory of Chamonix in 1202. These roles granted them rights over the Arve Valley between its two extremities. The castle of Faucigny, first mentioned in 1119 and the namesake of the family, is identified by Carrier as the "nucleus" of their power. Over time, the name "Faucigny" came to designate the wider region, corresponding to the Arve Valley, now known as the natural region of Faucigny.

== History ==
=== Earliest members of the lineage ===
The two charters dated 1083 and 1119 provide the basis for reconstructing a genealogical lineage of the House of Faucigny, as established by various historians. The lineage begins with Aimerard (or Eimerard) and his sons: Louis, Guy, Giselbert, Otton, and Guillaume (also recorded as Willelme). Louis is identified as the husband of Thetberge (or Thietburge) around 1060–1061. She is believed to have been a member of the House of Rheinfelden, possibly the daughter of Rudolf of Rheinfelden, Duke of Swabia, and Thetberge. Louis and Thetberge had three known children: Guy, who became Bishop of Geneva and is associated with the charters of 1083 and 1119; Amadeus, considered a possible but unconfirmed founder of the House of Blonay; and Guillaume (Willelme), referred to as “the Wise” (Filius W. sapientis de Fucinie), Lord of Faucigny, who continued the lineage. Following Louis's death, Thetberge is reported to have married Count Gérold of Geneva.

Lord Guillaume (Willelme) and his wife Ottilie (or Utilie)—possibly identified in an anonymous 19th-century genealogical note as Ottilie de Genevois, though this is not confirmed by modern scholarship—had several children: Raoul (also Rodolfe or Rodolphe I), Louis, Reymond, Gérard (Gérold), who became Bishop of Lausanne, and Amadeus, who became Bishop of Maurienne. Guillaume and his sons are named as witnesses to an undated donation to the Abbey of Aulps, believed to have taken place before 1103, according to Prosper Ménabréa. The same document also mentions a certain Saviu or Sayvin (Sayvinus), son of Augeron de Faucigny. Ménabréa, in a study of the Charterhouse of Vallon, suggests the hypothesis that Augeron may have been a brother of Guillaume (Willelme) de Faucigny.

Raoul (or Rodolfe, Rodolphe I) succeeded his father, Guillaume (Willelme), reportedly "long before the death of Guillaume, which occurred after 1124, [...] probably due to the infirmities of his father," according to Prosper Ménabréa. An anonymous 19th-century genealogical note states that "Guillaume I was no longer alive in the year 1119." However, documentary references to Guillaume are limited. In the 1119 confirmation charter, he is identified as lord and holder of the castle of Faucigny. Rodolphe I is first attested around 1094 as a witness for Count Humbert II of Savoy. He is referred to as Rodulfus de castro Fulciniaco in a donation recorded around 1121, to which he gave his consent. The identity of his wife is uncertain. Some sources, including an anonymous genealogical note from 1826 and the Historical Dictionary of Switzerland (2004), suggest she may have been Constance de Beauvoir, based on a reference to a memorial in the royal archives of Turin, originating from the chapter archives of Grenoble. The known sons of Rodolphe I include Aymon (or Aimon), who succeeded him; Humbert, who may have succeeded Aymon; Rodolphe, founder of the Lucinge branch; Arducius (†1185), later Bishop of Geneva; Ponce (†1178), founder of the Abbey of Sixt; and Raymond, probably founder of the House of Thoyre-Boussy. The exact date of Rodolphe I's death is unknown. Ménabréa estimates it occurred before 1138. A genealogical note from 1826 claims that Rodolphe I participated in the Crusade of 1147 alongside his son Aymon, though this may reflect a confusion with Rodolphe, son of Aymon I.

The knight Aymon (or Aimon I) succeeded his father, Rodolphe I, as head of the lordship of Faucigny. His wife, Clémence, is believed—according to Amédée de Foras—to have belonged to the Briançon family, established in the Tarentaise region. The couple is thought to have had six children, including Raoul (Rodolphe II), who succeeded his father and likely died before 1178, when his younger brother Henri is documented as lord. Aymon I and his son Rodolphe participated in the Second Crusade (circa 1147), alongside Count Amadeus III of Savoy. Around 1138, before the crusade, the Carthusians were invited to settle in the Brevon Valley, near an existing Benedictine priory, on lands described as deserted in Vallon, within the territory of Faucigny. The lord of Faucigny granted donations to support the establishment of a Charterhouse at this site. Following his return, Aymon I founded the Charterhouse of Le Reposoir in Faucigny on 22 January 1151.

Raoul (or Rodolphe), the third son of Rodolphe I of Faucigny, was known by the epithets "the German" or "the Teuton/Teutonic," likely due to his association with the Imperial army. He is referred to in sources as Rodulfus de Fulciniaco cognomento Alamant, Rodolfus Alamandus testis, or Rodolfus Teutonicus testis (as cited by Ménabréa from Besson). He is also known as de Greysier, according to Amédée de Foras. Rodolphe is recognized as the founder of both the Lucinge branch (Faucigny-Lucinge) and the Graisier/Greysier branch. Historians such as Prosper Ménabréa (1854, 1865) and Chaix d'Est-Ange (1921) report that he married Emma Eynard, a member of a prominent family from the Dauphiné, later associated with the name Monteynard. Ménabréa further specifies that a document from the priory of Domène in the Grésivaudan region identifies her as the daughter of Guigues de Domène, son of Ponce-Aymard, a notable local lord. The Régeste genevois (1866) refers to a donation by Guigues de Domène dated circa 1155, stating: “This gift is confirmed [...] by his daughter, wife of Rodolphe de Faucigny.” The document is interpreted as confirming the marriage of Emma de Domène to Rodolphe, known as "the German" and brother of Arducius. Some authors have also proposed that Rodolphe was the progenitor of the Alleman family in the Dauphiné.

Henri, Lord of Faucigny and son of Aymon I, married a woman referred to as "Comtesson" or "the countess," identified as a daughter from the second marriage of Count Amédée I of Geneva. He was the father of Aymon II, with whom the senior branch of the House of Faucigny became extinct in the male line.

=== Influence ===
In the second half of the 12th century, the House of Faucigny established itself as a dominant power in the region, holding a substantial domain along the banks of the Arve, with extensions along the shores of Lake Geneva and the Rhône. Amédée de Foras notes that the complex web of feudal entanglements—marked by alliances between the Houses of Geneva, Faucigny, and Savoy, as well as the cession and conquest of various territories—obscures the status of the Lords of Faucigny as independent princes. Although they were required to pay homage for certain lordships to the Counts of Geneva, those same counts were at times vassals of the bishop, the Count of Savoy, or even the Lord of Faucigny. Historian Paul Guichonnet emphasizes that the Lords of Faucigny were primarily based in the Giffre Valley and the middle and upper Arve Valley, gradually expanding into the lower Arve Valley near Geneva. Their principal strongholds included the castles of Faucigny, Châtillon, and Sallanches. Around 1200, Aymon II of Faucigny established his residence in the Château de Châtillon, whose central location within the province facilitated more effective governance. From the mid-12th century, the family also held the Château de Flumet, which allowed them to control the Val d’Arly and its access from the Combe de Savoie.

In the lower Arve Valley, the distribution of power reflects the observations of Paul Guichonnet. The Lords of Faucigny controlled the left bank of the Arve River, acquiring in the 13th century the small castles of Crédoz and Bellecombe near Reignier. On the same bank, their authority was supported by the Château de Bonne, which provided control over the Menoge Valley (also known as the Boëge Valley), as well as Vétraz, the Château de Monthoux, and the fortified house of Lucinge. Around 1245, Aymon II of Faucigny founded two bastides (planned towns), Hermance and Monthoux, both situated near Geneva. The construction of the Château d’Hermance marked a strategic advancement, securing the family's presence on the shores of Lake Geneva.

The Lords of Faucigny had several vassals, including the Dardel of Arthaz. Among their feudatories under the authority of the Counts of Geneva were the Faucigny-Lucinge, Thoire, Bellegarde, Cissé (Chissé) of Polinges, Magny of Reignier, Nangy, and La Fléchère of Saint-Jeoire.

Historians Nicolas Carrier and Matthieu de La Corbière observe that, beyond its patrimonial foundations—which were relatively limited in extent—the influence of the House of Faucigny stemmed from three principal factors that emerged during the 12th century and the early 13th century. Among these were their religious policy (see below) and the political tensions that followed the death of Count Amadeus I of Geneva (1128–1178).

=== The Faucigny and the church ===
Like other princely families of the region, the House of Faucigny established close ties with the Church through patronage, the founding of religious institutions, and by placing younger sons in ecclesiastical positions. Historians Nicolas Carrier and Matthieu de La Corbière describe these as "fortunate placements" that enabled the family, between 1083 and 1185, to secure four prominent episcopal and abbatial offices in the Alpine region. According to the charters of 1083 and 1119, three members of the family held episcopal sees in neighboring dioceses: Guy served as Bishop of Geneva (c. 1083–1119); his nephews Gérard (also known as Gérold or Giraud) was Bishop of Lausanne (1103–1124); and Amédée served as Bishop of Maurienne (c. 1116–1124). In the following generation, Arducius (†1185) held the bishopric of Geneva (1135–1185), while his brother Ponce (1144–1178) founded and became abbot of the Abbey of Sixt.

Historians consider these ecclesiastical appointments to have played a significant role in shaping the political orientation of the lineage. Arducius, in particular, opposed Count Amadeus I of Geneva (1128–1178), a stance that led to his receiving the title of "Prince" from the Holy Roman Emperor in 1154.

=== Disappearance of the senior branch ===
Amid ongoing tensions with the Counts of Geneva, to whom the Lords of Faucigny owed fealty, Aymon II of Faucigny distanced himself from his obligations and aligned more closely with the Counts of Savoy. Count Thomas I of Savoy is believed to have provided him with financial support for territorial expansion in the northern Lake Geneva region, thereby gaining the allegiance of several seigneurs in the Vaud region at the expense of the Count of Geneva. Without a male heir, Aymon II designated his second daughter, Agnes, as his universal heir. In 1234, she married Peter of Savoy, son of the Count of Savoy. The marriage was celebrated at the Château de Châtillon and marked a shift in regional power, bringing the Arve Valley under Savoyard influence. Aymon II subsequently took steps to consolidate Peter's authority in the region.

In 1256, the territory of Faucigny was formally referred to as a barony, and by 1265, it was organized as a bailliage, an administrative district composed of ten castellanies: Bonne, Crédoz, Châtillon, Faucigny, Flumet, Hermance, Monthoux, Pont-sur-Arve (Boringe), Sallanches, and Toisinges (later known as Bonneville).

Following the deaths in 1268 of Peter II, Count of Savoy, and his wife Agnes of Faucigny, their lands were divided between their daughter Beatrice of Savoy and her aunt, Béatrice of Thoire-Villars. Béatrice of Faucigny had married Guigues VII of Viennois in 1241, under the influence of her grandfather Aymon II. Guigues held the titles of Dauphin of Viennois and Count of Albon, Grenoble, Oisans, Briançon, Embrun, and Gap. Beatrice of Thoire-Villars, on the other hand, was married to Étienne II, Lord of Thoire and Villars. Concerned about the weakening of Savoyard control over Faucigny, Count Philip I of Savoy supported Béatrice of Thoire-Villars against her niece, fueling a conflict between the two claimants. Armed hostilities ensued. Philip I imprisoned Béatrice of Faucigny and her son, secured the allegiance of Étienne II of Thoire, and reasserted Savoyard oversight over the territory of Faucigny. Despite these developments, the conflict continued. Béatrice of Faucigny was compelled to render homage to the Count of Savoy on several occasions—in May 1293, April 1295, and again in 1296—before ultimately ceding her rights as an apanage to her grandson Hugues (†1329).

The conflict between the House of Savoy and the Dauphin of Viennois intensified during the 14th century. It was resolved with the Treaty of Paris in 1355, which established a territorial exchange between Faucigny and the regions of Bresse and Valbonne. This agreement resulted in the permanent integration of Faucigny into the Savoyard State.

=== A cadet branch: Faucigny-Lucinge ===
Rodolphe, known as "the German" and associated with Grésier, is recognized as the founder of the cadet branch later known as Faucigny-Lucinge. He had two sons: Guillaume (or Vullielme), a knight who may have established the Greysier branches—though Amédée de Foras expresses caution on this point—and Rodolphe II, also referred to as "the German" and "of Greysier," who was the first to adopt the name Lucinge.

Rodolphe II served as seneschal of Faucigny and became the first lord of Lucinge through his marriage to the heiress of the Lucinge family. Her name is variously recorded as Kéberge or Tetberge (Foras), and Roberge or Tatberge (Chaix d’Est-Ange), described as the niece or granddaughter of Turembert de Lucinge, seneschal of Faucigny, from whom Rodolphe inherited the title. The Lucinge family had held the seneschalty of Faucigny since the 12th century. Rodolphe II is also believed to have married Alix, daughter of Count Humbert of Geneva, based on a donation to the Abbey of Sixt by Turumbert de Lucinge in which Alix of Geneva appears as the wife of Rodolphe de Grésier. An anonymous genealogical notice from 1826 further states that he married Gertrude d’Oncieux.

Rodolphe II had three sons: Rodolphe III, a knight who died before 1289 and continued the lineage; Augeron, who died without issue; and Vullielme (or Guillaume), known as de Greysier or de Chuyt. Amédée de Foras expresses uncertainty as to whether Vullielme or his uncle was the founder of the Greysier and Chuyt branches.

Before 1229, Rodolphe III appears to have adopted the name Lucinge in place of Faucigny. He held the titles of lord of Lucinge and Arenthon and served as seneschal of Faucigny. He married Marguerite, and they had two sons, Guillaume and Aymon. According to an anonymous genealogical notice from 1826, his wife was Élisabeth de Beauvoir, and they had four children: Guillaume IV, Lord of Lucinge; Adalbert, Patriarch of Jerusalem; Irénée, a Knight of the Order of the Temple; and Jean, conventual prior of Notre-Dame du Reposoir.

The Lucinge branch held the seigneuries of Arenthon and Lucinge, along with various properties in the Faucigny region. They exercised the hereditary office of seneschal, which conferred judicial authority and the right to collect significant revenues.

The growing power of the Lucinge branch led to tensions with the senior line of the House of Faucigny. The latter regularly obstructed efforts by the Lucinge family to fortify their residence. Guillaume de Lucinge († c.1276), grandson of Rodolphe II and bailiff of Faucigny, fortified his estate and entered into conflict with Beatrice of Savoie, known as Beatrice of Faucigny, (Note: Lullin & Le Fort 1866, p. 275) the last heiress of the senior line and Dauphine of Viennois. A dispute arose between Béatrice and Guillaume de Lucinge concerning jurisdiction and authority. Although a settlement process was initiated, Guillaume died before its conclusion. On 8 March 1276, his widow Eléonore and their children—Humbert, Aymon, François, Raymond, Guillaume, Agnès, Béatrix, Amphélise, Marguerite, and Isabeau—were formally required to renounce the office of seneschal and the right of high justice. They also relinquished the castle of Ravorée and recognized that they held all their possessions in Lucinge, Arenthon, and throughout the barony of Faucigny—from the Dranse to La Roche and from Versoix to Flumet—as fiefs under the authority of Béatrice.

== Cadet branches ==
The House of Faucigny appears to have given rise to several branches, including the Lucinge, Vozerier, and Châtillon lines, as well as other lesser-known offshoots. Amédée de Foras also identifies families that either descend from or have claimed descent from the House of Faucigny, such as the Allamand of Saint-Jeoire; the Alleman of Bugey, Valbonnais (Dauphiné), Aubonne, and Coppet (Pays de Vaud); and probably the Blonay, along with the Arenthon and du Fresney families, who the lords of Faucigny recognized as sharing their lineage. Regarding the du Fresney family, Foras notes in his entry that although they claimed ancient nobility and descent "de genere Fucigniaci," they obtained letters patent from Dauphin Humbert on 22 April 1328 affirming this descent and granting exemption from taxes and levies. However, the document does not specify the nature of their connection to the House of Faucigny, leading Foras to suggest that the descent may have been through illegitimate means.

=== The Faucigny-Lucinge branch ===

The arms of the Faucigny-Lucinge family are blazoned as:

Quartered of Faucigny (which is paly of gold and gules) and Lucinge (which is bendy of gules and argent), or per pale of Faucigny and Lucinge.

Per pale: the first, paly of gold and gules, which is of Faucigny; the second, argent with three bends gules, or the second, bendy of gules and argent, which is of Lucinge.Also found: Quartered, in the first and fourth, paly of gold and gules of six pieces; in the second and third, argent with three bends gules.

Crown: princely crown; Crest: an armored arm brandishing a silver sword; Supporters: two wild men in gold;

Motto: Usquequo (Foras), also given by Chaix d’Est-Ange as a war cry: Usque Quo, who also attributes a second motto: À la bonne ville, bonne nouvelle (To the right town, right news).

Rodolphe de Faucigny, son of Raoul II (or Rodolfe), held the titles of lord of Greysier, Arenthon, and Lucinge, and served as seneschal of Faucigny. He was nicknamed "the German" or "the Teutonic" in reference to the favor he received at the imperial court. Around 1180, he married Tetberge, niece and heiress of Turumbert de Lucinge. Their son, Rodolphe de Greysier (or Grésy), adopted the name Lucinge. (Note: Lullin & Le Fort 1866, p. 434)

The Faucigny-Lucinge family later incorporated the names Coligny and Chastillon following the 1752 marriage of Louis Christophe de Faucigny-Lucinge and Eléonore Charlotte de Sandersleben (1720–1781).

Branches of the Lucinge family bore heraldic brisures (marks of cadency) to differentiate lines of descent.

=== Branches of the (Faucigny-)Lucinge ===
- Lords of Drusilly and branch of Vevey: Vert with three bends argent. In the 1856 edition, the Armorial historique du canton de Vaud indicates that this family bore two coats of arms: Quartered: two fasces vert, and argent with three bends gules; Vert with three bends argent. In the 1880 edition, only the second is mentioned: Vert with three bends argent.
- Lucinge of Passy, lords of Marlioz: A cadency mark from Lucinge featuring a gold eight-rayed star on the first gules bend in chief or bendy argent and gules, the first gules bend charged in chief with a sable eight-pointed star.
- Lords and later marquises of Lucinge, barons of Arenthon: Bendy of gules and argent. Several authors suggest that the Arenthon family was likely an offshoot.
- Co-lords of Lucinge, lords of Arcine: Bendy of gules and argent.
- Lucinges-les-Alymes, co-lords of Lucinge, lords of Saint-Cergues, etc.
- Faucigny-Lucinge and Coligny (County of Coligny)

=== Other branches ===
- Vozerier (also Vosereu, Vozerier, Vauserier, Vaugerier Faucigny-Vozerier), absent from Foras's Armorial et nobiliaire de l’ancien duché de Savoie. Originating from a hamlet near La Roche, lords of Scionzier (Mussel);
- Châtillon (or Faucigny-Châtillon). Lords of Châtillon. Blondel lists this family as "extinct at the beginning of the 14th century";
- Grésy or Greysier (Grésier, Graisy, Graisier). Lords of Grésy and Chuyt.

Guillaume de Faucigny, known as de Greysier (Wullielmum de Greysier), son of Rodolphe I of Faucigny, known as the German. He married Agnès of the Montmayeur family. Knight Guillaume de Greysier is mentioned in a donation act to the Abbey of Abondance in 1180.

Arms of the Greysier family are blazoned:

Paly of gold and gules of six parts, with a fess argent.

- Thoire (or Thoyre), including the Thoire de Pilly branch.

Arms of the Thoire family:

Azure, a bend argent.

- Alleman (Aleman), Alamandi, Allemand (Dauphiné), hypotheses.

== Roles and Charges ==
The lords of Faucigny held sovereign authority over the domain of Faucigny, which corresponded in part to the Arve Valley.

The Lucinge branch exercised the office of seneschal and later that of bailiff of Faucigny from 1138 until the reign of Beatrice of Faucigny. Following the integration of Faucigny into the States of Savoy, members of the Lucinge family entered into the service of the Counts and later Dukes of Savoy. Hugonin (or Hugues) de Lucinge served as bailiff of Faucigny from 1410 to 1419.

Some family members served as castellans for the counts of Savoy in:

- Allinges-Vieux (1289);
- Ballaison (1450–1451);
- Bonneville (1361–1370, 1415–1419);
- Châtelet du Crédoz (1565);
- Châtillon and Cluses (1414–1419);
- Cruseilles (1371–1378);
- Faucigny (1394–1410);
- Montjoie (1340–1348);
- Rumilly-sous-Cornillon (1411–1417);
- Ternier (1659).

== Lineage ==
The Bugey genealogist Samuel Guichenon included a genealogical table of prominent families, including the House of Faucigny, in Histoire généalogique de la royale maison de Savoie (1660). This genealogy, presented alongside the later works of Count Amédée de Foras, has been partially confirmed by contemporary research. The early portion of the lineage is notably attested in a charter dated 2 September 1119.

Family of Faucigny
- Aimerard / Eimerard (c. 1000) married to Aalgert / Aalgirt / Aalgut (Note: Lullin & Le Fort 1866, p. 173)
- Louis I (c. 1030 – † c. 1080), lord of Faucigny Married to Thetberge / Thietburge
- Guillaume / Willelme / Vuillielme, known as “the Wise” (after 1053 – † 1124), lord of Faucigny. Married to Ottilie
- Raoul / Rodolfe / Rodolphe I (c. 1095 – † after 1131), lord of Faucigny Married to [unknown]
- Aymon / Aymar I (c. 1125 – † 1192), lord of Faucigny. Married to Clémence of Briançon (Note: Lullin & Le Fort 1866, p. 112)
  - Raoul / Rodolphe († after 1178)
  - Henri (c. 1155 – † 14 November 1197), provost of the cathedral of Geneva (1168), lord of Faucigny (1178). Married to Comtesson of Geneva
  - Willelme / Guillaume II († 19 September or October 1202), lord of Faucigny
  - Aymon / Aimon II (c. 1180 – † after October 1253), lord of Faucigny Married in 1210 (?) to Béatrice of Auxonne (?)
    - Béatrix (c. 1210 – † after 8 March 1276) Married to Étienne II of Thoire and Villars
    - Agnès (before 1215–1268), lady of Faucigny (1253–1268) Married to Pierre II of Savoy, from whom:
      - Béatrice / Béatrix, lady of Faucigny (1268–1304), called “the Great Dauphine” 1st husband: Guigues VII, Dauphin of Viennois 2nd husband: Gaston VII, Viscount of Béarn
        - Anne (1255–1298), married in 1273 to Humbert of La Tour du Pin, Dauphin of Viennois, Baron of La Tour and Coligny
        - Jean I of Viennois (1264–1282), Dauphin of Viennois, Baron of Faucigny
- (Aymon, bastard) Married in 1231 to Flotte de Royans Married in 1251 to Béatrice of Bagé
  - Béatrix
- Guillaume (1178)
- Aimon (1178)
- Marchand (1178)
- Béatrix (1174–1179), married to Guillaume I, Count of Geneva
- Aleyde, nun
- Ardutius / Arducius († 25 July 1185), Bishop of Geneva (1135–1185)
- Gui de Faucigny (1140)
- Rodolphe de Faucigny, called "the German" (c. 1140 – † after 1178), probably married (before 1155) to Emma, daughter of the lord of Domène, founder of the Faucigny-Lucinge branch
  - Rodolphe Senior, known as “German” or “Alamau,” probable founder of the Alaman lines of Saint-Jeoire, Aubonne, Bugey, etc.
  - Rodolphe Junior, known as “of Grésier” († after 1233), lord of Lucinge, of Arenthon, seneschal of Faucigny Married to Kéberge of Lucinge
    - Guigues des Alleman, founder of the Alleman branch Married to Bonne of Grolée From whom:
      - Married to Alix / Alisia of Geneva
    - Guillaume (1180), founder of the Faucigny-Grésy branch Married in 1180 to Agnès
    - Raymond (1178), likely founder of the lords of Thoire-Roussy branch
    - Ponce († 1178), abbot of Sixt, abbot of Abondance
    - Louis
    - Raymond
    - Gérold († 1 July 1129), Bishop of Lausanne (c. 1105–c. 1126)
    - Amédée († c. 1125), Bishop of Maurienne (1112–c. 1125)
    - Guy († 1119), Bishop of Geneva (1083–1119), founded the Abbey of Contamine-sur-Arve in 1083 (family necropolis)
- Amédée (1083) Married to [name] of Glane
- Ita / Ida (1075 – † c. 1091), second wife of Count Aymon I of Geneva

== Notable figures ==
=== Religious figures ===
The family's political strategy enabled them to obtain episcopal or abbatial seats:

Bishops of Geneva

- Guy de Faucigny, episcopate c. 1078/1083 to c. 1119;
- Arducius de Faucigny, episcopate 1135 to 1185;
- Pierre de Faucigny, episcopate 1311 to 1342.

Bishop of Maurienne

- Amédée de Faucigny, episcopate c. 1112/1116 to 1124.

Bishop of Lausanne

- Gérold de Faucigny, episcopate 1103 to 1124.

Abbot of Sixt

- Ponce de Faucigny, from 1144 to 1178.

== Holdings ==
Alphabetical, non-exhaustive list of properties held in their own name or as fiefs by the Faucigny family:

- Château d’Allinges-Vieux (late 12th century), at Allinges;
- Château d’Arcine, at Clarafond-Arcine (1296–1398);
- Château d’Arenthon (likely 12th century), at Arenthon;
- Château de Beaufort (1271–1348), at Beaufort;
- Château de Bonneville, at Bonneville (1268–1282);
- Château de Boringe or Pont-sur-Arve (before 1263), at Reignier;
- Château de Cessens-Neuf, at Cessens, mentioned in 1281;
- Château de Cessens-Vieux, at Cessens, mentioned on 1 February 1125;
- Château de Châtillon-sur-Cluses (13th century, likely older), at Châtillon-sur-Cluses;
- Château de Charousse (mentioned in 1225, likely older), at Passy;
- Châtelet du Crédoz;
- Château de Faucigny, first mentioned in 1119 is, considered the family's cradle;
- Château de Flumet, known as the Château des Faucigny (mid-12th century, now in ruins), at Flumet;
- Château des Outards (1277–1348), at Beaufort;
- Château de Rochefort, at Boëge;
- Château de Sallanches (from the 12th century?), at Cordon.

== See also ==
- History of Savoy in the Middle Ages

== Notes ==
1. Hilaire de Saint-Jean-Baptiste, known as Dom Hilaire Leyat or Layat, was claustral prior of Abondance and a historian.

== Bibliography ==
- Baud, Henri; Mariotte, Jean-Yves; Guerrier, Alain (1980). Histoire des communes savoyardes: Le Faucigny [History of the communes of Savoie: Faucigny] (in French). Roanne: Éditions Horvath. ISBN 2-7171-0159-4.
- Carrier, Nicolas; de La Corbière, Matthieu (2005). Entre Genève et Mont-Blanc au XIVe siècle: enquête et contre-enquête dans le Faucigny delphinal de 1339 [Between Geneva and Mont Blanc in the 14th century: investigation and counter-investigation in the Faucigny delphinal of 1339] (in French). Librairie Droz. ISBN 978-2-88442-019-8.
- Chaix d'Est-Ange, Gustave (1921). Dictionnaire des familles françaises anciennes ou notables à la fin du XIXe siècle [Dictionary of old or notable French families at the end of the 19th century] (in French). Vol. XVII. Charles Herisseys. pp. 136–143.
- de Foras, Amédée (1910). Armorial et nobiliaire de l'ancien duché de Savoie [Armorial and nobiliary of the former Duchy of Savoy] (in French). Vol. 2. Grenoble: Allier Frères. pp. 317–354.
- Lullin, Paul; Le Fort, Charles (1866). Régeste genevois ou Répertoire chronologique et analytique des documents imprimés relatifs à l'histoire de la ville et du diocèse de Genève avant l'année 1312 [Régeste genevois or Chronological and analytical repertory of printed documents relating to the history of the city and diocese of Geneva before 1312] (in French). Société d'histoire et d'archéologie de Genève.
- "Régeste Genevois" [Geneva region]. Fondation des Archives historiques de l'Abbaye de Saint-Maurice (Suisse) (in French).
- Mariotte, Jean-Yves (1972). "Les sires de Faucigny" [The Sires of Faucigny]. Cahiers de l'Alpe (in French) (57): 83–86.
- Jougla de Morenas, Henri (1939). "De Faucigny-Lucinge" (PDF). Société du Grand armorial de France (in French). 3 (14775): 343.
- Impr. de Cosson [Genealogy of the Faucigny-Lucinge family] (in French). Paris: Allier Frères. 1844.
