= Château de Faucigny =

Fortified castle in France

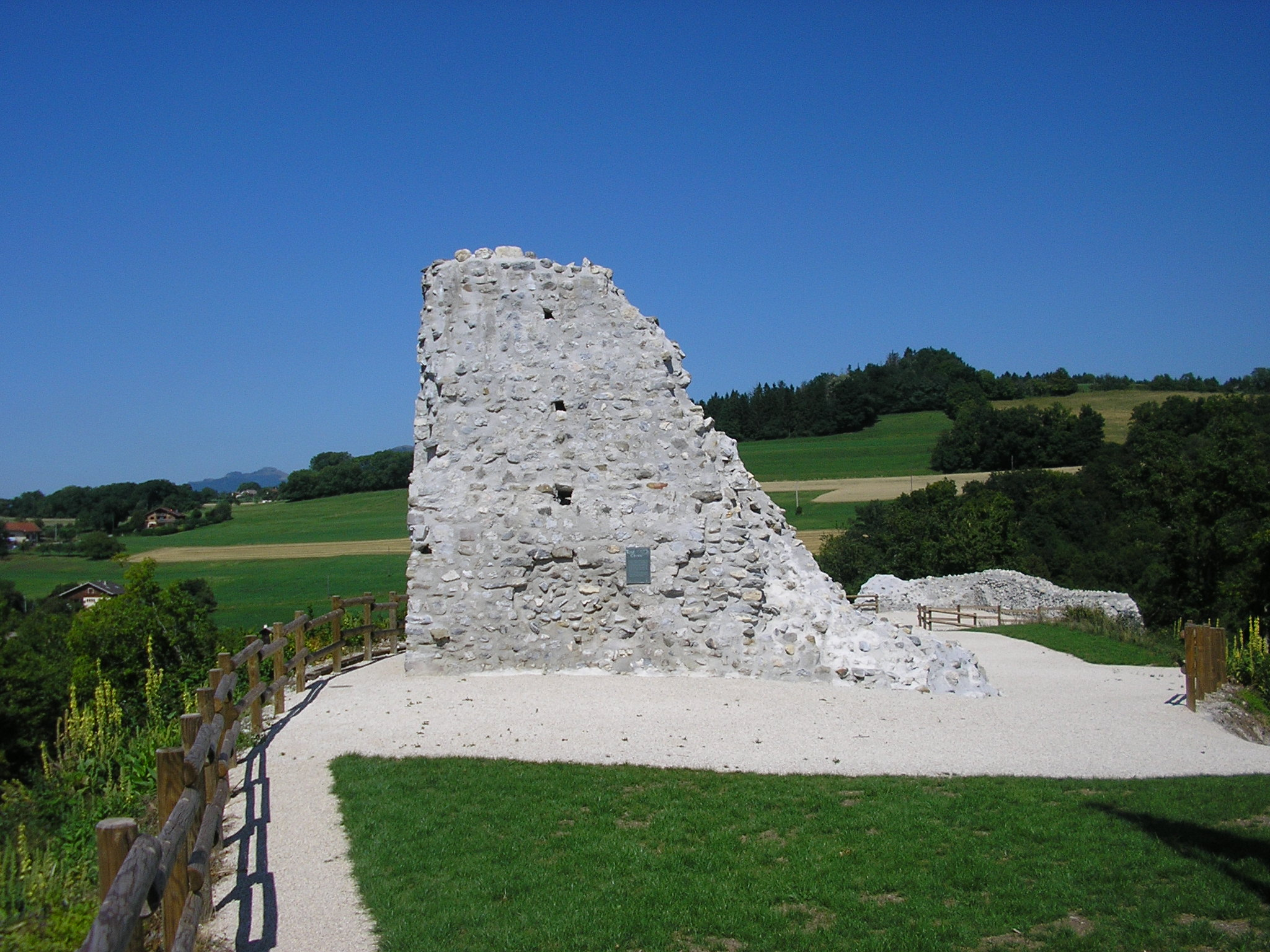
- Interactive map of Château de Faucigny
- Location: Country: France; Former provinces of the Duchy of Savoy: Faucigny; Region: Auvergne-Rhône-Alpes; Department: Haute-Savoie; Municipality: Faucigny
- Coordinates: 46°06′57.91″N 6°21′28.66″E
- Type: Castle
- Beginning date: 11th century
- Purpose: Original: Seigneurial residence Current: Community of municipalities of the four rivers

The Château de Faucigny is a former fortified castle dating from the 11th century, the ruins of which stand in the commune of Faucigny in the department of Haute-Savoie, within the Auvergne–Rhône-Alpes region. It was the original seat of the lords of Faucigny, who controlled the Arve Valley, and later became the center of a châtellenie from their disappearance, from the 13th to the 16th century.

== Location ==
The remains of the Château de Faucigny are located in the commune of Faucigny in the Haute-Savoie department, on a dolomitic limestone outcrop at an elevation of 706 meters. The site overlooks the Arve Valley and the commune of Contamine-sur-Arve by more than 250 meters.

== History ==
The castle, the original seat of the House of Faucigny, probably already existed around 930, although it is not explicitly recorded until 1119. According to historian Nicolas Carrier, it constituted the core of the family's authority.

The lords of Faucigny remained at the site until the early 13th century. Around 1200, Aymon II of Faucigny left the ancestral castle and established his residence at the Château de Châtillon-sur-Cluses, which occupied a more central position within the family's domains.

As the seat of a châtellenie, the site lost prominence in 1251 with the establishment of Bonneville and its new castle, although it remained the center of a seigneury.

It passed to the House of Savoy in 1262. In her will, Agnès of Faucigny left the castle to her husband, Peter of Savoy, whom she had married in February 1234. The site was thereafter occupied by a garrison commanded by a seneschal selected from the House of Faucigny–Lucinge. In the peace treaty of August 1308 between the Count of Savoy and Béatrice, known as the "Grande Dauphine," the castles of Faucigny, Bonne, Monthoux, Bonneville, Châtelet-de-Credo, Alinge-le-Vieux, and Lullin, along with their mandements and jurisdictions, were confirmed as fiefs of the Count of Savoy.

At the beginning of the 14th century, the castle was administered by a châtelain. Families holding this office included, in addition to the Lucinge, the La Fléchère, Menthon, and Moyron families.

Under the apanage of the Genevois-Nemours in the 16th century, the site was used as a prison and, after being abandoned, had fallen into ruin by the mid-16th century. The Barnabites purchased the castle and its mandement from Victor Amadeus II in 1699. By 1738, it was described as completely ruined, although the main structure was still standing, and during the occupation of the Duchy of Savoy by French Revolutionary troops, it was used as a stone quarry for building materials.

Under the Sardinian monarchy, the surrounding land and the castle ruins were purchased by a deputy named Bastian. The cross erected at the end of the rocky spur dates from the 17th century and is attributed to one of his descendants.

== Description ==
The castle consisted of two successive enclosures. The first, or lower enclosure, surrounded the plain castle. Bordered by ditches, it enclosed the village of Faucigny. Access was defended by a fortified gate flanked by two square towers, later converted into dwellings. The gate was equipped with a portcullis, the groove of which remains visible, and a drawbridge.

The second, or upper enclosure, contained on its northern side a Romanesque square keep measuring 9.50 meters per side, with angle buttresses, which was demolished in 1891. Owing to its small dimensions, it resembled the Bergfrieden commonly found in imperial territories and in southern France. Its stones were reused in the construction of the presbytery. A residential building was attached to the keep, and at its far end stood a tower known as the "Queen's Tower." These structures appear to be the oldest parts of the castle, built of small ashlar and probably dating from the 11th century. A description indicates that this residence contained large rooms, kitchens with ample light, stables, and a storeroom.

== Châtellenie of Faucigny ==
When the Faucigny family settled in Châtillon, the Château de Faucigny was placed under the authority of a seneschal and later a châtelain.

=== Organization ===
According to local historian Lucien Guy, the Château de Faucigny was the residence of the seneschal of Faucigny. It later became the center of a châtellenie, or mandement, established from the 13th century. At the end of the 12th century, the Faucigny region was organized around nine châtellenies, (Note: List of the nine châtellenies in order of precedence: Châtillon, Toisinges (Bonneville), Bonne, Sallanches, Faucigny, Le Châtelet du Crédoz, Samoëns, Montjoie, and Flumet.) with Faucigny ranked fifth in order of precedence, according to the old inventory of the titles of Faucigny (1431), as cited by Canon Jean-Louis Grillet.

During the Delphinal period (1342–1343), Faucigny was organized around fifteen châtellenies, including Faucigny.

Villages, parishes, fortifications of the castellany of Faucigny
Commune	Name	Type
Faucigny	Château de Faucigny	castle
Fillinges	Château de Couvette	castle
Fillinges	Maison forte de Chillaz	fortified house
Fillinges	Maison forte de Fillinges	fortified house
Fillinges	Maison forte de Bouger	fortified house
Saint-Jean-de-Tholome	Grand Château	castle
Saint-Jeoire	Château Cornu	fortified house
Saint-Jeoire	Château de Beauregard	fortified house
Saint-Jeoire	Château de Cormand	castle
Saint-Jeoire	Maison forte de la Ravoire	fortified house
Saint-Jeoire	Maison forte de Saint-Jeoire	fortified house
Saint-Jeoire	Maison forte de Turchon	fortified house
La Tour	La Tour	other

During the early 14th century, the barony of Faucigny was reorganized into seventeen châtellenies.

=== Seneschals, then châtelains ===
The office of seneschal of Faucigny remained with the Lucinge family. The seneschal, a knight dependent on the lord of Faucigny, held the position as a fief and occupied the highest rank among the officers of the lord's household, serving as a lieutenant or commander-in-chief, according to Canon Jean-Marie Lavorel (1846–1926).

In the County of Savoy, the châtelain was an "officer appointed for a fixed term, revocable and removable." He was responsible for managing the châtellenie or mandement, collecting the domain's fiscal revenues, and maintaining the castle. The châtelain was sometimes assisted by a financial receiver, who drafted the "final version of the annual report submitted by the châtelain or his lieutenant."

Seneschals, then Châtelains of Faucigny, 12th–17th Century
Faucigny Administration
- 1138: Falco, seneschal
- 1168: Aymon de Lucinge, seneschal
- 1185: Gérard de Lucinge, seneschal
- 1192: Turumbert de Lucinge, seneschal and master of the household
- 1222–1235: Rodolphe de Lucinge, seneschal
- 1263–1275: Guillaume de Lucinge, Lord of Arenthon, seneschal for Agnès of Faucigny, then for her daughter Béatrix of Faucigny
- 1264–1265: Guichard de Varay, bailiff in Genevois and Faucigny
- ...: Humbert de Lucinge, seneschal for Béatrix de Faucigny
- 1274: Reymond Vieux, seneschal

Administration under Savoyard control, then definitively Savoyard

- May 1303–26 March 1310: Gauthier Bouvet, métral of the land of Faucigny in Tarentaise, receiver of the revenues and obligations (succession) of the said land. Châtelain indicated, but unnamed, in an act of 1309 of Lady Béatrix de Faucigny and Hugues Dauphin
  - December 1308–January 1310: Girard Dufreiney, receiver
- February 1313–January 1314: Humbert de Thoyre
- 15 July 1355–30 July 1394 (also receiver for the periods 25 June 1362–27 March 1363, 25 January 1372–25 January 1373, 11 May 1378–30 July 1394): Guigues de Soumont
- 30 July 1394–6 June 1410 (also receiver for 1 December 1406–6 June 1410): Hugonin de Lucinge
- 6 June 1410–24 June 1420: Mermet de Villier (Viller)
- 24 June 1420–16 July 1436: Pierre de Villier, heir and son of Noble Mermet de Villier
- 16 July 1436–26 March 1439 (also receiver for 26 March 1438–26 March 1439): Noble Pierre Massuer
- 26 March 1439–16 August 1441: Noble Henri de la Fléchère
- 16 August 1441–26 March 1462 (also receiver for 26 March 1447–26 March 1448, 26 March 1456–26 March 1457): Aymon de la Fléchère, nephew of Henri
- 26 March 1462–26 March 1463: Noble Acquinet de Clers
- 26 March 1463–26 March 1464: Noble Nicod de la Fléchère
- 26 March 1464–27 May 1465: Noble Aymon de la Fléchère
- 27 May 1465–1 April 1480 (also receiver for 26 March 1473–26 March 1474): Noble Louis d'Avanchy
- 1 April 1480–26 March 1494 (also receiver for 26 March 1483–26 March 1484): Noble Antoine de Menthon, also châtelain of Beaufort (1479–1502), Thônes (1480–1497), and La Roche (1490–1491)
- 26 March 1494–15 May 1530 (also receiver for 26 March 1495–26 March 1496, 26 March 1522–26 March 1523): Noble Georges de Menthon

Administration of the apanage of Genevois (1514–1659)

Châtelains and Fermiers

- September 1531–September 1552 (also receiver for September 1546–September 1547): Noble Jean de Moyron
- 1534: Noble Nicolas Chesney
- 1534–1538: Noble Raymond Fabri and Master (Note: Master is a title associated with "prosecutors, notaries, practitioners, and commissioners.") or Noble Pierre Marin
- 1539: Noble Aymon Callige
- 1539–1541: Noble Jacques de Perra
- 1543–1547: Noble Jean de Moyron
- 1547–1550: Noble Étienne Mestral
- 1550–1553: Noble Jean de Moyron
- 1556–1559: Noble Michaud de Sarsonay
- 1559–1565: Maître Antoine Dumont
- 1565–1568: Maître or Noble François Chevrier
- 1568–1571: Maître François Ruin
- 1571–1577: Maître Léonard Seraphin
- 1577–1580: Maître or Noble François Chevrier
- 1580–1586: Maître François Ruin
- 1586–1592: Maîtres Claude Molin, Guillaume Desaix, and Louis Dunant
- 1592–1598: Maître François II Dufoug
- 1598–1604: Noble Jacques Morel
- 1604–1610: Maître Jean-Louis Dunoyer
- 1610–1616: Noble Jacques Morel
- 1616–1622: Maître Martin Paris
- 1622–1628: Maître Claude Chartrier
- 1628–1634: Maître Antoine Demusy
- 1634–1640: Maître Pierre Bastian
- 1640–1646: Maîtres François Bastian and Claude Chartrier
- 1646–1648: Maître Jean-Jacques Bosson
- 1648–1653: Maître François Bastian
- 1652–1659: Maître Gaspard Famelloz

== See also ==
- Medieval fortification
- Faucigny

== Bibliography ==
- Baud, Henri; Mariotte, Jean-Yves; Guerrier, Alain (1980). Histoire des communes savoyardes : Le Faucigny [History of Savoyard municipalities: Le Faucigny] (in French). Roanne: Éditions Horvath. ISBN 2-7171-0159-4.
- Carrier, Nicolas; de La Corbière, Matthieu (2005). Entre Genève et Mont-Blanc au XIVe siècle : enquête et contre-enquête dans le Faucigny delphinal de 1339 [Between Geneva and Mont Blanc in the 14th century: investigation and counter-investigation in the Dauphin's Faucigny in 1339] (in French). Librairie Droz. ISBN 978-2-88442-019-8.
- Chapier, Georges (2005). Châteaux Savoyards : Faucigny, Chablais, Tarentaise, Maurienne, Savoie propre, Genevois [Savoyard castles: Faucigny, Chablais, Tarentaise, Maurienne, Savoie propre, Genevois]. L'amateur Averti (in French). La Rochelle: Éditions La Découvrance. ISBN 978-2-84265-326-2.
- Guy, Lucien (1929). "Les anciens châteaux du Faucigny" [The ancient castles of Faucigny]. Mémoires & documents (in French). 47.
- Payraud, Nicolas (2009). "Châteaux, espace et société en Dauphiné et en Savoie du milieu du XIIIe siècle à la fin du XVe siècle" [Castles, space, and society in Dauphiné and Savoie from the mid-13th century to the end of the 15th century] (PDF). HAL - Archives Ouvertes (in French): 3–4.
- Salch, Charles-Laurent (1987). Dictionnaire des châteaux et des fortifications du Moyen Âge en France [Dictionary of Medieval Castles and Fortifications in France] (in French) (28th ed.). Strasbourg: Éditions Publitotal. ISBN 2-86535-070-3. OCLC 1078727877.
- Regat, Christian; Aubert, François (1999). Châteaux de Haute-Savoie : Chablais, Faucigny, Genevois [Castles of Haute-Savoie: Chablais, Faucigny, Genevois] (in French). Éditions Cabédita. ISBN 978-2-88295-117-5.

=== Archival collections ===
- "Inventaire-Index des comptes de châtellenie et de subsides" [Inventory-Index of accounts for the castellany and subsidies] (PDF). Archives départementales de la Savoie (in French).
- Leguil, Matthieu (2015). "Le châtelain, le compte et le clerc. Les acteurs de la reddition des comptes de châtellenie en Bourgogne aux xive et xve siècles, d'après l'exemple du bailliage d'Auxois" [The lord of the manor, the count, and the clerk. The actors involved in the rendering of accounts for the manor in Burgundy in the 14th and 15th centuries, based on the example of the bailiwick of Auxois.]. Comptabilités (in French). 7.
