= Château de Montjoie (Les Contamines-Montjoie) =

French fortress

- Château de Béatrice
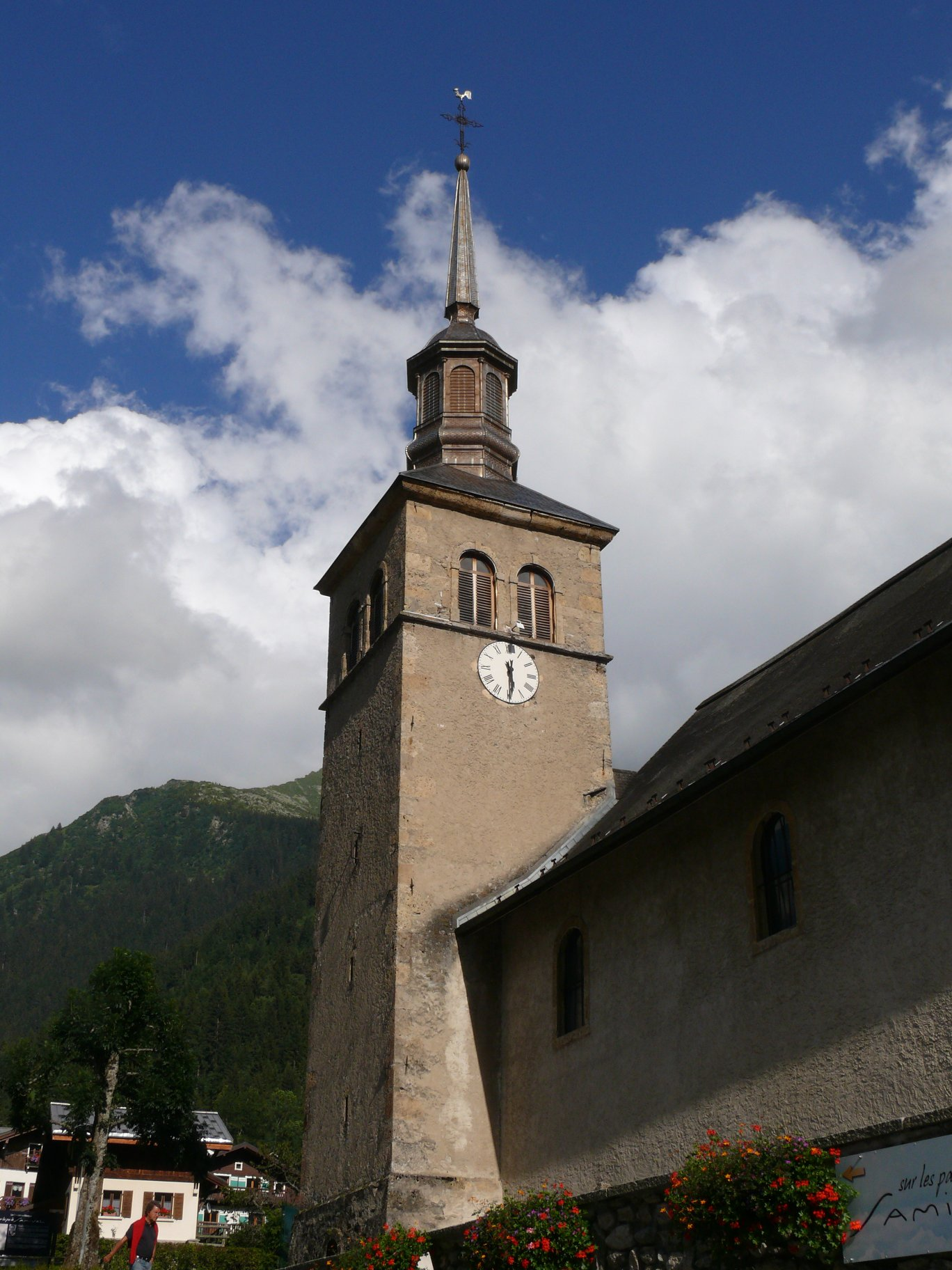
- Location: Country: France; Former provinces of the Duchy of Savoy: County of Savoy; Region: Auvergne-Rhône-Alpes; Department: Haute-Savoie; Municipality: Les Contamines-Montjoie
- Type: Castle
- Beginning date: 12th century/13th century
- Purpose: Original: Seigneurial residence Current: Ruined

The Château de Montjoie (castrum Montis Gaudii), also known as the Château de Béatrice, was a 12th-century fortress located in the Faucigny region. It stood in the center of the present-day commune of Les Contamines-Montjoie in the Haute-Savoie department of the Auvergne–Rhône-Alpes region. Between the 13th and 15th centuries, it served as the administrative center of a châtellenie.

== Toponymy ==
The name Montjoie derives from the Germanic mundgawi, meaning a "border height with a military post." Medieval copyists recorded the term as Mons Gaudii. The valley occupies a border position between the Faucigny and the Beaufortain.

The castle is also referred to as the Château de Béatrice, a designation linked to the presence of Béatrice de Faucigny, known as the Grand Dauphine.

== Geography ==
The Château de Montjoie was located in the village of Les Contamines-Montjoie. The site now corresponds to the location of the village church, whose bell-tower base incorporates the remains of one of the castle's former towers.

The castle occupied a strategic position in the Val Montjoie, on the right bank of the Bon-Nant torrent. It controlled access to the route connecting the Arve Valley, via Saint-Gervais, to the Col du Bonhomme, as well as the route from the Col du Joly toward the Beaufortain. The passage over the Col du Bonhomme had been in use since at least the Gallo-Roman period.

The site also served as a border zone with the Beaufortain, which was under the authority of the archbishops of Tarentaise.

== History ==
The castrum appears to have been constructed during the 12th century. Its earliest known mention dates to 1277 in a document referring to an albergement (inter nantum de Contamina prope castrum Montis Gaudii).

Montjoie and its lords were vassals of the lords of Faucigny. In 1234, Peter of Savoy married Agnes, the sole heiress of Baron Aymon II of Faucigny. After the baron died in 1253, Pierre inherited the seigneury of Faucigny and reorganized it into châtellenies, with Montjoie forming one of them in association with Sallanches.

By the late 13th century, the castle served as the center of one of the nine châtellenies under the jurisdiction of the bailliage of Faucigny, encompassing Montjoie and Saint-Gervais. Three parishes were associated with this territory: Saint-Nicolas-de-Véroce, Saint-Gervais, and Notre-Dame-de-la-Gorge.

Béatrice of Faucigny, the Grand Dauphine and lady of Faucigny, is generally regarded as the probable founder of the site and is documented as having resided there on multiple occasions. The châtellenie held the eighth rank in the regional order of precedence.

The arms of the mandement of Montjoie were blazoned as a golden lion on an azure field.

In 1355, following the Treaty of Paris, the Count of Savoy acquired the barony of Faucigny, which had previously belonged to the Dauphins of Viennois. The removal of the border reduced the strategic significance of the castle, and administrative authority, now primarily economic, shifted toward Saint-Gervais. Although the châtellenie retained its name, the châtelain thereafter resided in the fortified house known as the Maison-Forte de la Comtesse in Saint-Gervais, constructed by the Count of Savoy in 1373.

== Description ==
Although the castle no longer survives, various studies provide an understanding of its overall layout. It appears to have had a quadrangular plan with a keep, and village houses were likely constructed directly against its outer walls.

== Seat of a châtellenie ==
=== Organization ===
The Château de Montjoie was the center of a châtellenie, also called a mandement, of Faucigny, established from the end of the 12th century and the beginning of the following century. Faucigny is considered to have been organized around nine châtellenies (Note: List of the nine châtellenies following the order of precedence: Châtillon, Toisinges (Bonneville), Bonne, Sallanches, Faucigny, Le Châtelet du Crédoz, Samoëns, Montjoie, and Flumet.) at the end of the 12th century, with Montjoie occupying the 8th rank in precedence, according to the old inventory of the titles of Faucigny (1431), cited by the canon Jean-Louis Grillet.

During the Delphinal period (1342–1343), Faucigny was organized around fifteen châtellenies, including Montjoie.

The Maison Forte de la Comtesse, located in Saint-Gervais, later became the residence of the châtelain, while the name "châtellenie de Montjoie" was retained.

Villages, parishes, and fortifications of the châtellenie of Montjoie
Commune	Name	Type
Les Contamines-Montjoie	Château de Montjoie	castle
Les Contamines-Montjoie	Châtelet	small castle
Les Contamines-Montjoie	maison forte de La Frasse	fortified house
Les Contamines-Montjoie	Le Châtel	small castle
Saint-Gervais-les-Bains	Maison forte de Hautetour	fortified house
Saint-Gervais-les-Bains	maison-forte dite de la Comtesse	fortified house
Saint-Gervais-les-Bains	La Tour	other
Saint-Gervais-les-Bains	Le Château	small castle
Saint-Gervais-les-Bains	Le Châtelet	small castle
Saint-Gervais-les-Bains	Les Châtelets	small castle
Saint-Gervais-les-Bains	Les Châtelets	small castle

During the early 14th century, the barony of Faucigny was reorganized around seventeen châtellenies.

In the 17th century, the arms of the mandement were described as a golden lion on an azure field.

=== Châtelains ===
In the County of Savoy, the châtelain was an officer appointed for a fixed term, with revocable and removable authority. He was responsible for managing the châtellenie or mandement, collecting the domain's fiscal revenues, and maintaining the castle. The châtelain was sometimes assisted by a financial receiver, who prepared an annual report of the châtelain's activities.

Castellans of Montjoie, 13th–17th century
Faucigny, Dauphiné, and then French administration
- 1288: simple mention
- 1292: Sadans
- 1297: Jean de Samoen (family of Samoëns)
- 1300–1303: Henry de Graveruel, also castellan of Saint-Michel-du-Lac
- 1337–1338: Pierre de Boëge. Payraud gives for this period Jean des Bauges, also castellan of Sallanches
- 1340–1348: Bastard de Lucinge
- 1355: Pierre de Hauteville

Savoyard administration

- 1355–1356: Jaquemet de Landru
- 1356–1358: Jacques de Chevelu
- 1358–1363: Jean de Filinge
  - 1363: Guillaume de Cors
- 1363–1368: Bérard de Bellegarde
- 1368–1380: Antoine de Montfalcon
- 1383–1385: Jean Ravais
- 1385–1397: Pierre de Bellegarde. Payraud gives for this period Fournier
- 1397–1399: Catherine de Bellegarde, wife of the previous
- 1399–1417: Pierre Amblard de Chignin
- 1417–1436: Jean de Compois
- 1436–1441: Rodolphe (I) d'Allinges, lord of Coudrée
- 1441–1479: Guillaume (I) d'Allinges, governor and bailiff of the Pays de Vaud, son of Rodolphe (I)
  - 1441–1467: Louis (I) and Rodolphe (II) d'Allinges, brothers of the previous and sons of Rodolphe (I)
  - 1467–1530: Louis (II) and Rodolphe (III or IV) d'Allinges, brothers, sons of François Bon d'Allinges, co-castellans. François Bon was probably castellan of Chaumont (1466–1510) and of Ternier (1471–1485), or a close relative
  - 1479–1530: Guillaume (II) d'Allinges

Administration of the apanage of Genevois (1502–1659)

- 1514: Noble Georges de La Frasse
- 1525–1257: Pierre d'Allinges, Montjoie subsidy
- 1530–1565: François-Boniface d'Allinges, also "grand bailiff of the County of Genevois"
- 1530: Noble Hudry de Montfort
- 1531–1533: Noble Georges de La Frasse
- 1534–1535: Noble Nicolas de La Frasse
- 1536–1541: Noble Benoît Guigard
- 1543–1547: Noble Gaspard de Riddes
- 1547–1550: Noble Aymé Du Fresney
- 1550–1556: Noble Gaspard de Riddes
- 1559–1565: Noble Aymé de Cuppelin (Cupelin)
- 1560: Noble Gabriel Du Fresney
- 1565–1568: Noble Charles-François de La Frasse, who subrogates the office to master (Note: Master is a title associated with "procurators, notaries, practitioners, and commissioners.") André Dufoug
- 1574–1580: Noble Gabriel Du Fresney
- 1580–1592: Noble Nicolas Du Fresney
- 1592–1598: Maître Michel Dupras
- 1598–1604: Noble Louis de Menthon de Dingy
- 1604–1610: Maître Jean Quart
- 1610–1616: Noble Jean-Jacques Du Fresney
- 1616–1628: Noble Étienne Du Fresney
- 1628–1634: Noble Jean-Baptiste Du Fresney
- 1634–1646: Maître Nicolas Peyraud, with the lease of lods
- 1646–1652: Maître Georges Fontannaz
- 1652–1659: Noble Aymé II Du Fresney

== See also ==
- Medieval fortification
- Fortification

== Bibliography ==
- Baud, Henri; Mariotte, Jean-Yves; Guerrier, Alain (1980). Histoire des communes savoyardes : Le Faucigny [History of Savoyard municipalities: Le Faucigny] (in French). Roanne: Éditions Horvath. ISBN 2-7171-0159-4.
- Baud, Henri (1955). "La châtellenie de Montjoie" [The castellany of Montjoie]. Revue de Savoie (in French). XIV: 159–178.
- Baud, Henri (1965). "Les origines de la châtellenie de Montjoie" [The origins of the castellany of Montjoie]. Mémoire et document de l'Académie du Faucigny (in French). XIV: 23–36.
- Blondel, Louis (1956). Châteaux de l'ancien diocèse de Genève [Castles of the former diocese of Geneva]. Mémoires et documents (in French). Vol. 7. Société d'histoire et d'archéologie de Genève. pp. 115–117.
- Besson, Maurice (2007). La Vallée de Montjoie. Le site et son histoire. Vieilles demeures et vieilles coutumes [The Montjoie Valley. The site and its history. Old houses and old customs] (in French). Publibook. ISBN 978-2-7483-3548-4.
- Carrier, Nicolas; de La Corbière, Matthieu (2005). Entre Genève et Mont-Blanc au XIVe siècle : enquête et contre-enquête dans le Faucigny delphinal de 1339 [Between Geneva and Mont Blanc in the 14th century: investigation and counter-investigation in the Dauphin's Faucigny in 1339] (in French). Librairie Droz. ISBN 978-2-88442-019-8.
- Lullin, Paul; Le Fort, Charles (1866). Régeste genevois : Répertoire chronologique et analytique des documents imprimés relatifs à l'histoire de la ville et du diocèse de Genève avant l'année 1312 [Régeste genevois: Chronological and analytical directory of printed documents relating to the history of the city and diocese of Geneva prior to 1312] (in French). Société d'histoire et d'archéologie de Genève.
- Payraud, Nicolas (2009). "Châteaux, espace et société en Dauphiné et en Savoie du milieu du XIIIe siècle à la fin du XVe siècle" [Castles, space, and society in Dauphiné and Savoie from the mid-13th century to the end of the 15th century] (PDF). HAL - Archives Ouvertes (in French): 3–4.

=== Archival collections ===
- "Série B - Cours et juridictions. - Parlements. - Bailliages et autres juridictions secondaires" [Series B - Courts and jurisdictions. - Parliaments. - Bailiwicks and other secondary jurisdictions]. Cote d'Or (in French).
- "Inventaire-Index des comptes de châtellenie et de subsides" [Inventory-Index of accounts for the castellany and subsidies] (PDF) (in French). pp. 192–202.
