= Château de Flumet =

Fortified site in France

- Château des Faucigny
- Location: Country: France; Former provinces of the Duchy of Savoy: Val d'Arly (Faucigny); Region: Auvergne-Rhône-Alpes; Department: Savoie; Municipality: Flumet
- Type: Castle
- Beginning date: 12th century, remodeled in the 13th century
- Completion date: In ruins since the 15th century

The Château de Flumet, also known locally as the Château des Faucigny, was a 12th-century fortified site located in the Val d'Arly. Now disappeared, it stood above the commune of Flumet in the Savoie department, within the Auvergne–Rhône-Alpes region. Between the 13th and 15th centuries, it served as the seat of a châtellenie.

== Location ==
Flumet is located on the southern boundary of the seigneury of Faucigny, adjacent to the County of Savoy. The castle controlled access to the upper Val d'Arly from the Combe de Savoie, particularly from the direction of Ugine. The castle or keep was constructed on a rocky hill overlooking the confluence of the Arly and the Arondine.

== History ==
The castle was likely constructed in the mid-12th century, shortly before the development of the fortified town, which is mentioned in the 1151 foundation charter of the Reposoir Charterhouse. Under Baron Aymon II of Faucigny, in the early 13th century, a fortified settlement formed around the site. The first known reference to the castle dates to 1228, when the town received a charter of liberties.

In the 13th century, the castle and seigneury were held by the lords of Faucigny before passing to the House of Savoy. Peter of Savoy married Agnès of Faucigny, the sole heiress of Baron Aymon II, in 1234. After Aymon II’s death in 1253, Pierre of Savoy reorganized the barony of Faucigny into several châtellenies.

Peter of Savoy had the castle strengthened prior to 1263, the year he inherited the comital throne of Savoy.

His daughter Beatrice subsequently inherited the title and the lands associated with the baronies of Faucigny and Beaufortain, including the Val d’Arly and the Château de Flumet, in accordance with her grandfather’s directives.

By the late 13th century, the castle served as the center of one of the nine châtellenies within the bailiwick of Faucigny.

In 1339, the Dauphin, then ruler of Faucigny, levied a toll at Flumet.

The castle had fallen into ruin by the 15th century. After a major fire struck the town of Flumet in June 1679, the inhabitants were authorized by Marie-Jeanne Baptiste, regent of the Duchy of Savoy, to reuse materials from the castle for reconstruction.

== Description ==
According to the “delphinal” inquiry of April 1339, the Château de Flumet consisted of a square central tower and a second tower positioned above the entrance. The complex was enclosed by a surrounding wall that included residential buildings. The fortification wall was higher on the Savoy-facing side to the southwest.

== Châtellenie of Flumet ==
=== Organization ===
The Château de Flumet served as the center of a châtellenie, or mandement, within Faucigny from the 13th century onward. By the late 12th century, Faucigny was organized into nine châtellenies, (Note: List of the nine châtellenies in order of precedence: Châtillon, Toisinges (Bonneville), Bonne, Sallanches, Faucigny, Le Châtelet du Crédoz, Samoëns, Montjoie, and Flumet.) with Flumet listed in ninth position in the order of precedence according to the 1431 inventory of Faucigny’s titles, as later cited by Canon Jean-Louis Grillet.

During the delphinal period, Faucigny was reorganized between 1342 and 1343 into fifteen châtellenies, one of which was Flumet.

After Faucigny became part of the domains of the count-apparent of Genevois—who also held the titles of baron of Faucigny and of Beaufort—the châtellenie of Flumet was reclassified as a vice-châtellenie and placed under the authority of the châtellenie of the Châtelet du Crédoz.

Villages, Parishes, and Fortifications of the Châtellenie of Flumet
| Commune | Name | Type |
|---|---|---|
| Demi-Quartier | Châtelard of Demi-Quartier | small castle |
| Flumet | Flumet | fortified castle |
| Flumet | fortified house of Riddes | fortified castle |
| Flumet | Tour des Bieux | fortified castle |
| La Giettaz | Châtelard of La Giettaz | small castle |
| La Giettaz | Châtelard of the Aravis | small castle |
| Notre-Dame-de-Bellecombe | Châtellet of Notre-Dame-de-Bellecombe | castle |
| Notre-Dame-de-Bellecombe | Châtellet of Notre-Dame-de-Bellecombe | small castle |
| Praz-sur-Arly | Château of Praz-sur-Arly | castle |

During the early 14th century, the barony of Faucigny underwent another administrative reorganization, resulting in seventeen châtellenies.

In the 17th century, the arms of the mandement were described as three red pales on a gold field.

=== Châtelains ===
In the County of Savoy, the châtelain was an appointed officer serving for a fixed, revocable term. His duties included administering the châtellenie, collecting its fiscal revenues, and overseeing the maintenance of the castle.

In a 1988 presentation at the 32nd Congress of the Learned Societies of Savoy, Bernard Ducretet discussed the functions of châtelains, drawing on Étienne Dullin’s 1911 thesis Les châtelains dans les domaines de la Maison de Savoie en deçà des Alpes. He noted that until the mid-16th century, these officers acted as intermediaries between the local communities (Note: The “communiers or comparsoniers, consorts or jomarons” were a grouping or association of several peasant families, either within the framework of a parish or in the ownership or exploitation of undivided property.) of their châtellenie and the prince’s court, regularly reporting on administration and conveying the population’s requests and grievances.

From its integration into the Savoyard domain in 1355, the châtelain’s military role declined. The office, once a personal responsibility, became a hereditary position, with day-to-day administration managed by a lieutenant. The châtellenie was later incorporated into the apanage of Genevois (1514–1659), which included Faucigny and the barony of Beaufort.

Châtelains of Flumet, 13th to 16th Century
Faucigny, Dauphiné, and French Administration
- 1283–1286: Obert (Ubert) de Bardonnèche, also châtelain of Sallanches
- 16 April 1294 – 16 August 1295: Obert (Ubert) de Bardonnèche
- 2 August 1314 – February 1315: Pierre des Granges (Desgranges)
- 1321: Humbert de Cholex, also of Beaufort and Bonne
- 1337: Arthaud IV de Beaumont, bailiff of Faucigny, also châtelain of Beaufort and Bonne

Savoyard Administration

- 21 July 1355 – 15 June 1357: Jean du Molard
- 23 June 1357 – 15 February 1361: Jorgin de Plozasq
- 15 February 1361 – 15 May 1362: Heirs of Jorgin de Plozasq
- 15 May 1362 – November 1374 (also receiver for the periods 15 May 1362 – 27 January 1364, 8 February 1367 – 1 February 1368, 21 January 1372 – 1 March 1373): Jacquemet de Gilly
- 6 November 1374 – 19 January 1385 (also receiver for the period 4 April 1380 – 15 February 1381): Rolet de la Croix
- 19 January 1385 – 1 December 1385: Rodolphe de la Croix
- 7 December 1385 – 5 March 1392 (also receiver for the period 15 February 1390 – 16 March 1391): Jean de Conflans
- 26 June 1392 – 5 May 1394: Pierre Pugin
- 5 May 1394 – 8 June 1408 (also receiver for the period May 1401 – 28 March 1402): Viffrey de la Croix
- 1 December 1406 – 8 June 1410: Humbert de Melaz
- 8 June 1410 – 24 June 1416: Étienne Boudry de Bonne
- 24 June 1416 – 24 June 1417 (also receivers for the period): Pierre Duchesne and Pierre de Menthon, co-châtelains
- 24 June 1417 – 24 June 1419: Pierre de Menthon
- 24 June 1419 – 26 March 1437 (also receiver for the periods 24 June 1425 – 24 June 1426 and 26 March 1434 – 26 March 1435): Robert Vuagnard de Montvagnard, Robert I de Montvagnard
- 26 March 1437 – 26 March 1438 (also receiver for the period): Robert II de Montvagnard, son of the previous
- 26 March 1438 – 9 June 1441: Jean de Montvagnard, son of the previous
- 9 June 1441 – 26 March 1444: Hugues (Hugonin) Bertrand
- 26 March 1444 – 21 November 1450: Guillaume Bertrand, heirs of Hugues Bertrand
- 21 November 1450 – 26 March 1455: Guillaume de la Fléchière
- 27 September 1456 – 19 December 1465: Amédée (Ame) and Louis de la Fléchière, co-châtelains, sons and heirs of the previous
- 9 January 1466 – 8 January 1467: Jean de Compois, also châtelain of Annecy (1455–1458), Ballaison and Beauregard (1461–1462), Flumet (1466–1467), Évian and Féternes (1452–1461, 1462–1467), and Hermance (1461–1462)
- 8 January 1467 – 26 March 1511 (also receiver for the periods 26 March 1472 – 26 March 1473, 26 March 1484 – 26 March 1485, 26 March 1493 – 26 March 1494, 5 October 1501 – 26 March 1502, and 26 March 1510 – 26 March 1511): Claude de Menthon, lord of Rochefort
- 26 March 1511 – 26 March 1530 (also receiver for the periods 26 March 1518 – 26 March 1519 and 26 March 1529 – 26 March 1530): Jean de Marnix

Administration of the Appanage of Genevois (1502–1659)

Châtelains and Revenue Farmers of the Mandement

- 1514–1515: Noble Jean Jorcin
- 1515–1516: Noble Pierre Boisson
- 1517–1518: Noble Jacques Breysaz
- 1519: Noble Georges Marin
- 1523–1524: Noble Jean Jorcin
- 1524: Noble Claude Jobert
- 1526–1529: Noble Gaspard de Riddes
- 1529–1532: Noble Pierre de Riddes
- 29 September 1534 – 29 September 1535: Georges de Riddes
- 1534–1537: Noble Jacques Gavet
- 1537–1539: Noble Jean de Riddes

Appointed (*) by the King of France (Occupation of the Duchy, 1536–1559)

- 29 September 1540 – 29 September 1541: Noble Jean André (*)
- 29 September 1541 – 29 September 1542/ 1543: Master (Note: “Master” is a title associated with “procurators, notaries, practitioners, and commissioners.”) or Noble Bernard Andam (*)
- 29 September 1543 – 29 September 1544/ 1544–1545: Noble Jean Ulliet (*)
- 1546: Master Pierre Marin
- 1547–1548: Noble Jean André
- 29 September 1550 – 29 September 1551: Jean Marin (*)
- 1552–1553: Nicolas Tavel (*)
- 1553–1556: Master Mermet Berthod
- 1555–1559: Noble Jacques de Bieu

Appointed by the Duke

- 1559–1563: Noble Jacques de Bieu
- 1565: Master Jean Ducrestet, châtelain for judicial matters
- 1565–1568: S Antoine Marin
- 1568–1571: Noble François André and Master Jean Ulliet
- 1571–1572: Noble Claude Daniel
- 1572–1577: Noble Claude de Bongain
- 1574–1577: Noble Jean-Jacques de Bongain
- 1577–1580: Noble François de Riddes
- 1580–1586: Noble Jean-François de Riddes
- 1586–1592: Noble Jacques Morel
- 1592–1598: Master Pierre Marin
- 1594–1598: Noble Aymé André
- 1598–1604: Master Raymond Crépin
- 1604–1610: Noble Jean-Jacques de Bongain
- 1604–1610: Master Georges Magdellain
- 1609–1610: Master Claude Riond
- 1610–1616: Master Claude Marin
- 1616–1622: Noble Jean-François de Riddes
- 1622–1628: Master Jean Magdellain
- 1628–1634: Master Claude Marin
- 1634–1640: Master Étienne Montfort
- 1640–1646: Master Nicolas Peyraud
- 1646–1652: Master François Bargin
- 1650–1656: Master Guillaume Grosset
- 1652–1654: Masters Pierre Joly and Pierre Voultier, co-farmers
- 1654–1658: Master Jean-Jacques Losserand called La Verdure
- 1658–1659: Noble Pierre-François de Riddes, with the farm of lods

== See also ==
- Medieval fortification
- Castle
- Fortification

== Notes ==
1. List of the nine châtellenies in order of precedence: Châtillon, Toisinges (Bonneville), Bonne, Sallanches, Faucigny, Le Châtelet du Crédoz, Samoëns, Montjoie, and Flumet.
2. The “communiers or comparsoniers, consorts or jomarons” were a grouping or association of several peasant families, either within the framework of a parish or in the ownership or exploitation of undivided property.
3. “Master” is a title associated with “procurators, notaries, practitioners, and commissioners.”

== Bibliography ==
- Hudry, Marius (1982). Histoire des communes savoyardes: Albertville et son arrondissement (vol. 4) [History of Savoyard municipalities: Albertville and its district (vol. 4)] (PDF) (in French). Roanne: Éditions Horvath. pp. 403–409. ISBN 978-2-7171-0263-5. Archived from the original (PDF) on December 20, 2016.
- Carrier, Nicolas; de La Corbière, Matthieu (2005). Entre Genève et Mont-Blanc au XIVe siècle: enquête et contre-enquête dans le Faucigny delphinal de 1339 [Between Geneva and Mont Blanc in the 14th century: investigation and counter-investigation in the Dauphin's Faucigny in 1339] (in French). Librairie Droz. ISBN 978-2-88442-019-8.
- de la Corbière, Matthieu (2003). L'invention et la défense des frontières dans le diocèse de Genève: étude des principautés et de l'habitat fortifié, XIIe-XIVe siècle [The invention and defense of borders in the diocese of Geneva: a study of principalities and fortified settlements, 12th-14th centuries]. Mémoires et documents publiés par l'Académie salésienne (in French). Annecy: Académie salésienne. p. 290. ISBN 978-2-901-10218-2.
- Demotz, Bernard (2000). Le comté de Savoie du XIe au XVe siècle: Pouvoir, château et État au Moyen Âge [The County of Savoy from the 11th to the 15th century: Power, castles, and the State in the Middle Ages] (in French). Geneva: Slatkine. ISBN 2-05-101676-3.
- Dufour, Auguste; Rabut, François (1867). Histoire de la commune de Flumet [History of the municipality of Flumet]. Mémoires et documents (in French). Vol. 11. Chambéry: Imprimerie du Gouvernement - Société savoisienne d'histoire et d'archéologie. pp. 1–168. ISBN 2-05-101676-3.
- Lullin, Paul; Le Fort, Charles (1866). Régeste genevois: Répertoire chronologique et analytique des documents imprimés relatifs à l'histoire de la ville et du diocèse de Genève avant l'année 1312 [Régeste genevois: Chronological and analytical directory of printed documents relating to the history of the city and diocese of Geneva prior to 1312] (in French). Société d'histoire et d'archéologie de Genève.
- Payraud, Nicolas (2009). "Châteaux, espace et société en Dauphiné et en Savoie du milieu du XIIIe siècle à la fin du XVe siècle" [Castles, space, and society in Dauphiné and Savoie from the mid-13th century to the end of the 15th century] (PDF). HAL - Archives Ouvertes (in French).

=== Archival collections ===
- "SA - Comptes des chatellenies, des subsides, des revenus et des judicatures" [SA - Accounts of the chatellenies, subsidies, revenues, and judicatures.] (in French). Archived from the original on June 12, 2018.
- "Inventaire-Index des comptes de châtellenies et de subsides (conservés aux Archives départementales de la Savoie et de la Haute-Savoie) Série SA" [Inventory-Index of accounts of castellanies and subsidies (held at the Departmental Archives of Savoie and Haute-Savoie) Series SA] (PDF) (in French). pp. 212–221.
