= Château de Boringe =

French fortified structure

- Location: Country: France; Historical region: Faucigny; Region: Auvergne-Rhône-Alpes; Department: Haute-Savoie; French commune: Reignier
- Type: Castle
- Beginning date: 13th century
- Current destination: Ruined

The Château de Boringe (Latin: Buringium, Buringho), also known as Pont de Boringes or Pont-sur-Arve, is a fortified structure dating from the early 13th century and modified in the second half of that century. It was abandoned around the 17th century and has remained in ruins. Located in the present-day commune of Reignier-Ésery, it served briefly as the center of a seigneury before becoming a châtellenie during the 13th and 14th centuries.

== Location ==
The ruins of the fortified Château de Boringe are located on the left bank of the Arve, on a rocky outcrop. The site forms part of the hamlet of Boringe in the former parish of Saint-Romain, which was merged with the commune of Reignier in 1833.

The castle oversaw a bridge connecting the hamlet of Boringe on the left bank and the settlement of Boringe(s), in the parish of Nangy, on the right bank. This bridge, frequently used, allowed passage across the Arve along the route between Nangy and La Roche via the châtelet of Crédoz. From Nangy, the route extended toward Bonne and the Chablais. At a regional level, the castle controlled the axis between Geneva, downstream, and Bonneville, upstream. It faced the Château de Pierre, located on a nearby mound or “limestone terrace.”

The castle belonged to a seigneury jointly held by the Counts of Geneva and the Barons of Faucigny. The Counts of Geneva initially exercised authority over most of the territory before the rights were definitively transferred to the Faucigny.

The ruins, described by Louis Blondel as “buried under vegetation, but with a layout that remains clearly identifiable,” are situated on private property at the edge of the industrial zone and along the Saint-Romain road.

== History ==
=== First mention ===
The castle known as Pont-sur-Arve is first recorded in the second half of the 13th century and subsequently appears under the name Boringe (Buringium, Buringho). It is cited in an act dated 7 June 1263, in which Agnes of Faucigny, Baroness of Faucigny and newly Countess of Savoy, indicates that her husband, Count Peter of Savoy, had built and fortified several castles in Faucigny, including Pont-sur-Arve.

=== Life of the castle ===
In 1296, Béatrice of Faucigny granted the castle, referred to as the domus-fortis of Boringe, in fief to the knight Guillaume de Confignon (Cuffignion), who undertook repair work. The property returned to the Grande Dauphine in 1299. On 4 May 1319, Hugues de La Tour du Pin, Baron of Faucigny, granted it to Humbert de Cholay. In 1345, it passed to a half-brother of the lord Nicod de Ferney. The last heiress of the Ferney family, Guillemette, married Thomas de Genève-Lullin, son of Pierre, known as the “Bastard of Geneva” and himself the son of Count William III of Geneva. Their son Guillaume inherited the fief in 1429, and it remained an appanage of the cadet branch of the House of Geneva until the early 17th century.

=== Modern period ===
During the conflict between the Kingdom of France and the Duchy of Savoy, the castle was attacked on 1 January 1591. The French Reformed troops were commanded by the Baron de Sancy.

The Savoyard reinforcements were composed of Spaniards and Albanians. The castle, however, was destroyed by the artillery and French troops. About forty men, led by the Marquis de Lullin and without artillery, defended the site. On 2 January, “after seventy-two cannon shots, the castle surrendered.”

Part of the garrison retreated toward Bonne through the postern gate leading to the river. The fortress was subsequently dismantled by the French.

In 1594, the bridge collapsed, ending the castle's strategic function; a new bridge was later constructed downstream.

The castle then came under the authority of the House of Savoy, which carried out repairs to restore its defensive function. It subsequently served as the center of a mandement.

=== Contemporary period ===
During the occupation of the Duchy of Savoy by French Revolutionary troops, the deteriorated castle and its estate were sold to the Burnier-Fontanel family of Ésery.

In the mid-19th century, the estate was acquired by Doctor Bizot of Geneva, at a time when only ruins remained. He conducted archaeological excavations and created a landscaped park on the property.

During this period, Henry-John Terry produced an engraving of the ruins, published in L’album de la Haute-Savoie by Francis-Alphonse Wey, a project initiated by the Prefect of Haute-Savoie.

== Description ==
The castle is traditionally believed to have been fortified by Peter of Savoy around 1263. According to historian Louis Blondel, however, the square keep appears to be earlier in date. This structure, rectangular in plan and measuring approximately 7 by 8 meters, may originate from the early 13th century. It comprised several floors, and access likely involved circling the castle and crossing a drawbridge.

The Delphinal inquiry of 1339 describes the castle known as Pont de Boringes. The castle was situated on a defensible rocky mound above the Arve. It comprised a keep and two square towers, each approximately 14 toises high. Between the towers were a stable and a chamber, above which a hall was constructed with two hearths, and the upper floor contained three additional chambers.

== Châtellenie of Pont-sur-Arve ==
The castle served as the center of a châtellenie of Faucigny, established within the administrative framework of the bailiwick instituted by Peter of Savoy in 1265 and reaffirmed in 1330. Prior to this, the seigneury was dependent on that of Crédoz, according to the archaeologist Louis Blondel.

Between 1420 and 1429, the fief of Boringe passed to the Genève-Lullin family, who retained it until the early 17th century. The marquis François-Prosper de Genève-Lullin bequeathed the fief to his natural son Antoine, who founded the Genève-Boringe branch.

In 1607, Henry I of Savoy-Nemours, Duke of Geneva and Nemours, established the castle as the center of a châtellenie and granted the fief to Claude de Villiers. It subsequently returned to the domain of the Duke of Savoy, who in 1696 granted it to Janus de Bellegarde. The property was inherited by Jean-François Noyel de Bellegarde and, in 1744, passed to the de Conzié family. In 1746, Marc-Antoine de Genève-Lullin acquired the castle. Through marriage, it passed to the Sallier de la Tour family in 1770, before returning to the Genève-Lullin family seven years later.

== See also ==
- Medieval fortification

== Bibliography ==
- Baud, Henri; Mariotte, Jean-Yves; Guerrier, Alain (1980). Histoire des communes savoyardes : Le Faucigny [History of Savoyard municipalities: Le Faucigny] (in French). Roanne: Éditions Horvath. pp. 306–316. ISBN 2-7171-0159-4.
- Blondel, Louis (1978). Châteaux de l'ancien diocèse de Genève [Castles of the former diocese of Geneva] (in French). Vol. 7. Société d'histoire et d'archéologie de Genève. pp. 327 et seq.
- Carrier, Nicolas; de La Corbière, Matthieu (2005). Entre Genève et Mont-Blanc au XIVe siècle : enquête et contre-enquête dans le Faucigny delphinal de 1339 [Between Geneva and Mont Blanc in the 14th century: investigation and counter-investigation in the Dauphin's Faucigny in 1339] (in French). Librairie Droz. ISBN 978-2-88442-019-8.
- Chapier, Georges (1961). Châteaux Savoyards : Faucigny, Chablais [Savoyard castles: Faucigny, Chablais] (in French). Éditions de la revue "Les Alpes".
- Chapier, Georges (2005). Châteaux Savoyards : Faucigny, Chablais, Tarentaise, Maurienne, Savoie propre, Genevois [Savoyard castles: Faucigny, Chablais, Tarentaise, Maurienne, Savoie propre, Genevois]. L'amateur Averti (in French). La Découvrance. pp. 30–33. ISBN 978-2-84265-326-2.
- Guichonnet, Paul (1985). Histoire d'Arthaz-Pont-Notre-Dame [History of Arthaz-Pont-Notre-Dame]. Mémoires et document (in French). Vol. 92–93. Académie salésienne. p. 76.
- Guy, Lucien (1929). "Les anciens châteaux du Faucigny" [The ancient castles of Faucigny]. Mémoires & documents (in French). 47: 166–169.
- Lullin, Paul; Le Fort, Charles (1866). Régeste genevois ou Répertoire chronologique et analytique des documents imprimés relatifs à l'histoire de la ville et du diocèse de Genève avant l'année 1312 [Genevan Register or Chronological and Analytical Directory of Printed Documents Relating to the History of the City and Diocese of Geneva before the Year 1312] (in French). Société d'histoire et d'archéologie de Genève. p. 458.
