= Châteaux de Ternier =

Fortified structures in France

Castles of Ternier
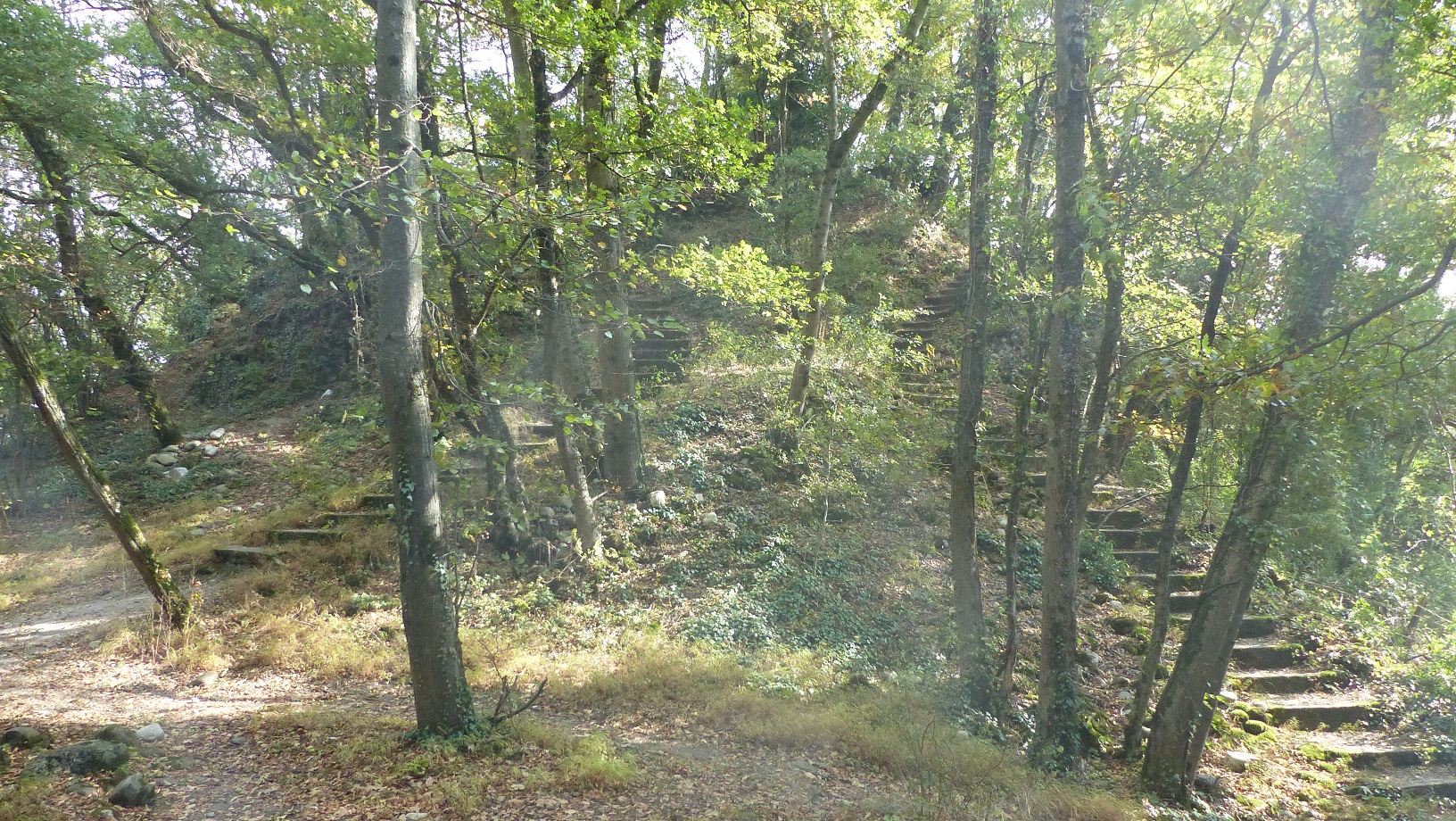
- The ruins of the keep known as “La Poype de Ternier.”
- Interactive map of Castles of Ternier
- Location: Country: France; Former provinces of the Duchy of Savoy: Genevois; Region: Auvergne-Rhône-Alpes; Department: Haute-Savoie; Municipality: Saint-Julien-en-Genevois
- Coordinates: 46°08′22″N 6°05′19″E
- Type: Castle
- Beginning date: 13th century
- Extra information: Original owner: Ternier family Original destination: Seigneurial residence

The Castles of Ternier (Latin: Terniacum, Ternye, castrum Terniaci) were two former fortified structures that once stood on a hill in the village of Ternier, now part of the commune of Saint-Julien-en-Genevois in the department of Haute-Savoie, in the Auvergne–Rhône-Alpes region.

The complex consists of two buildings dating from the 13th century—perhaps built on earlier structures—including the castle known as the “comtal,” which appears to have originally belonged to the Ternier family before being ceded to the Counts of Geneva, and a fortified house called La Poype (Poëpe), also sometimes referred to as “Ternier.”

== Toponym ==
Ternier is a toponym denoting a boundary or frontier, derived from a contraction of Terra ad lacum, meaning “lands at the end of Lake Geneva (Léman).”

Another interpretation holds that the name derives from a Gallo-Roman estate name formed from the anthroponym Ternius combined with the suffix -acum, producing Terniacum.

The earliest references to the parish and village date from 1220, with the form de Terniaco, followed by Ternier (1222), Ternie (1225), and Ternye (1288). The castle is first mentioned in 1225, although its construction may date to the preceding century.

== Location ==
The former settlement and the castles of Ternier were situated along the watercourse known as Le Ternier. The castles occupied a hill or castle mound—referred to as a poype in the former Duchy of Savoy—with an elevation of approximately 490 meters, overlooking the village of Ternier, now a small hamlet. The site dominated the valley of the Aire to the south and the valley of the Arande to the north.

The castle, together with the castle of Viry, oversaw the route connecting Geneva to Chambéry, particularly the Geneva–Seyssel axis.

== History ==
Ternier was the seat of an early lordship that was successively a vassal of the Counts of Geneva and the Counts of Savoy, later becoming a Bernese bailiwick before returning to Savoy. The lordship controlled the territories situated south of Geneva, between the Arve and the Laire.

=== Medieval period ===
The hill was occupied by a large castle that later served as a comital residence and the seat of the castellany. Nearby stood a fortified house known as La Poype, held by the Ternier family, a prominent lineage that for a time rivaled the Counts of Geneva. The family appears to have been vassals of the Counts of Geneva, although a 14th-century descendant acknowledged allegiance to the Grande Dauphine Béatrice of Faucigny. In the 12th century, despite the strategic position of the seigneurie, the Ternier family did not hold the title of vidomne of Ternier, which belonged to the Du Bois family. However, the first castle was likely their property before being ceded to the Counts of Geneva, and their fortified house of La Poype was subsequently converted into a residence. Members of the Ternier family bore the title barones, as indicated in two early 12th-century charters referring to Aymon de Ternier. They later held the titles of viscount or vidomne. Canon Jean-Louis Grillet describes the Ternier as one of the notable families of the county, alongside the families of Viry and Compey.

The Counts of Geneva and the Lord of Faucigny, supported by Peter of Savoy, were engaged in a conflict during the mid-13th century. In 1249 or 1250, Peter of Savoy seized the castle of Geneva. A settlement was reached under the arbitration of the Archbishop of Lyon, Philip of Savoy, Peter’s younger brother, who was accepted as mediator by both parties. The arbitration act, dated 10 June 1250, records that Peter of Savoy pledged the castle of Geneva, which he had recently taken, along with the castle of Alinge, the two Allinges castles having been united through his marriage to the Lady of Faucigny. In return, the Count of Geneva and his sons Rodolphe and Henri pledged six castles and various other properties, including the castle of Ternier.

In July 1252, the Bishop of Geneva, Aymon de Grandson, granted the market of Ternier, held on Thursdays, to Rudolf, son of the Count of Geneva, in exchange for fiscal and seigneurial rights.

On 29 April 1305, Count Amadeus II of Geneva rendered liege homage to the Bishop of Geneva, Aymon de Grandson, for various rights, fiefs, and castles, including the site of Ternier.

In 1497, François of Luxembourg received the revenues of the lordship of Ternier following his marriage to Louise of Savoy (1467–1522), Marquise of Baugé and Lady of Évian, daughter of Janus of Savoy, who held the County of Geneva as an apanage.

=== Modern period ===
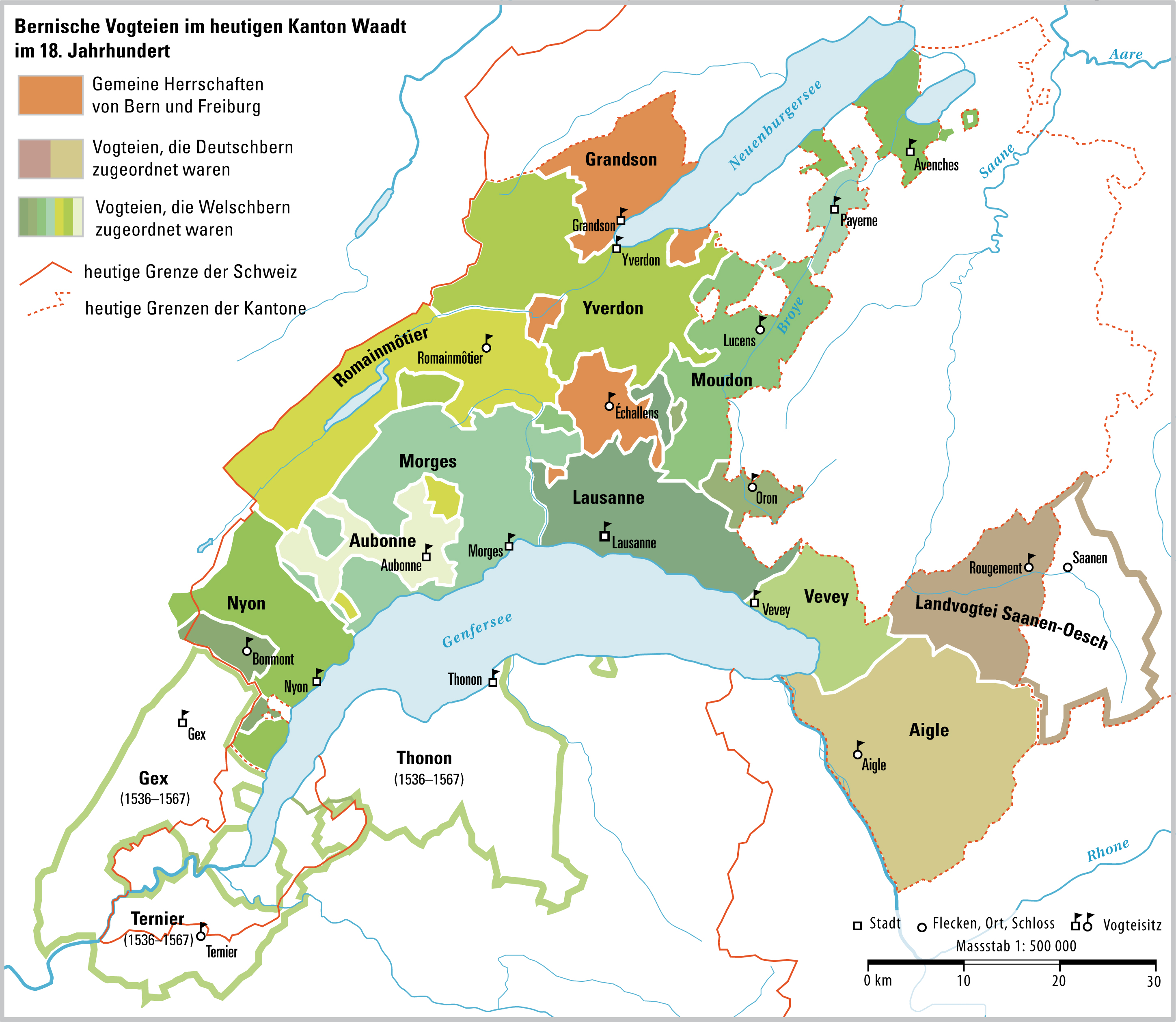
Map of the Bernese bailiwicks in the 16th century.

In the sixteenth century, the city of Geneva, which had adopted Protestantism, came into conflict with the Dukes of Savoy. Bern intervened in support of Geneva, and the region, including the neighboring Chablais, was occupied from 1536 to 1557. During this period, Ternier served as the center of a bailiwick. The bailiwick was returned by Bern in 1567.

In 1589, the comital castle was captured by Genevan forces. The Duke of Savoy, Charles Emmanuel I, led an artillery campaign to retake the site, personally commanding the troops on 1 June 1589. After the defenders refused to surrender, the castle was subjected to artillery fire before capitulating. The duke subsequently ordered the execution of the soldiers holding the fortress, and the castles were destroyed by Savoyard forces. Military operations then continued in the plain of Plan-les-Ouates, where the duke was defeated on 3 June 1589 despite having a numerically superior army.

In 1780, the bailiwick of Ternier was dissolved following the creation of the province of Carouge.

== Description ==
The two castles are located on a motte-and-bailey or poype. The two structures were separated by a mound.

=== Comital castle ===
The castle featured a keep with walls approximately 2.8 m thick. Its height is estimated at around 21 m and possibly higher, and it was originally roofed. The structure underwent multiple modifications over time.

The site is now entirely in ruins, with only the bases of the two main towers and fragments of the former enclosure still visible. Remnants of access paths and defensive ditches can also be identified.

A second, quadrangular tower measuring 13 × 11 m was constructed between 1328 and 1321. The fortress incorporated contemporary defensive innovations, including a shield wall forming a 140° angle.

=== Castle of la poype (Poëpe) ===
The castle featured a double enclosure associated with a keep, reflecting a design intended to protect the comital fortress from hostile approaches.

A chapel dedicated to Saint Nicholas was located within the enclosure.

== Possessions ==
The castle known as the “comital” castle was likely transferred by the Ternier family to the House of Geneva in the twelfth century, according to Menabrea and Jacquet. Duparc, however, notes that when Humbert of Villars granted the castle and its mandement to Girard de Ternier in 1394, the family did not previously hold rights over the property.

The earliest record indicating that the castle belonged directly to the Counts of Geneva dates from 1225. In 1250, it was pledged to Count Philip I of Savoy before returning to the Count of Geneva. In 1394, Girard de Ternier obtained the transfer of the castle and its mandement from Humbert de Villars, his nephew, following substantial loans made to Robert of Geneva, the future Pope Clement VII. Upon his death, Girard de Ternier ceded the property to Count Amadeus VIII of Savoy, according to a 1405 record.

== Châtellenie of Ternier ==
=== Organization ===
The castle of Ternier served as the seat of a châtellenie, or mandement (mandamentum), functioning as a comital châtellenie in the fourteenth century under the authority of the Count of Geneva.

Although the castle was directly under the Counts of Geneva, and later under the Counts of Savoy from 1401, it was granted in fief to castellans. The castellan was an officer appointed for a defined term, with authority that could be revoked or removed. Responsibilities included managing the châtellenie, collecting fiscal revenues, and overseeing the maintenance of the castle.

Castellans of Ternier from the 14th to the 17th century
Genevan Administration
- 1348 — 1350: Mermet des Alpes*, former castellan of Yvoire (1344–1347)
- 1354 — 1356: Mermet des Alpes*
- 1359 — 1360: Étienne de La Ravoire
- 1360 — 1362: His heirs (de La Ravoire)
- 1362 — 1373: Jean (I) de Menthon, also castellan of Charousse (1359–1362, 1371–1385), of Rumilly-sous-Cornillon (1373–1378)
- 1381 — 1382: Mermet des Alpes*
- 1382 — 1384: Jean de La Ravoire
- 1384 — 1386: His heirs (de La Ravoire)
- 1386 — 1389: Mermet de Menthon, called de Dingy
- 1391 — 1396: Girard de Menthon

Savoyard Administration

- 22 June 1418 — 23 October 1429 (also receiver for the period 22 June 1418 to 21 June 1419): Jean Martiny
- 23 October 1429 — 24 February 1433: Amédée (Amé, Amed) de Crescherel (Crécherel), also castellan of Sallanches (1427–1437)
- 25 February 1433 — 19 December 1444: Antoine Hôte
- 19 December 1444 — 21 January 1450: Girard de Genève
- 11 April 1450 — 21 January 1456: Amédée (Amé, Amed) de Virieu
- 1 July 1456 — August 1461: Bernard Pallien, of Saint-Portier
- August 1461 — 1 June 1471: Claude Andrinet, lord of Corsant
- 1 June 1471 — 1 March 1484: François Bon d'Alinges, lord of Servette (Servetaz), also castellan of Montjoie (1467–1530) and of Chaumont (1466–1510)
  - 1483: Jean-Louis de Savoie
- 1 March 1484 — 1 March 1485: François Bon d'Alinges and Ansermet Métral, co-castellans
- 1 March 1485 — 1 March 1488: Ansermet Métral
- 28 February 1489: Amédée de Viry
- 11 August 1546: Baron Charles de Sallenove
- 5 January 1589: Jérôme Lambert de Lornay, then bequeathed to his sister’s nephew, Jérôme d’Angeville, called Lambert, in 1611
- 9 May 1636: Sale to Jean-Antoine de Rossillon
- 1659: Marriage of Marguerite de Rossillon with Prosper II de Lucinges
- 29 May 1781: Annexation to the State domain. Erection as a marquisate.

=== Owners of La Poype ===
Coat of arms of the Montchenu family

The castle of la Poype (Poëpe) belonged to:

- 12th century — 1418: The Ternier family. The last member of the family, Girard (Gerard) de Ternier, died without children in June 1418. In his will, drafted that same month (13 June), he bequeathed his possessions to his nephew Richard de Montchenu. Girard had married Catherine de Montchenu.
- 1418 — 1544: Through inheritance, the Montchenu family, which adopted the name and coat of arms of the Ternier family from that date.
- 1544 — 1610: Jean-Claude de Châteauneuf de Montchenu, of the Montchenu-Châteauneuf branch.
- 1610 — 1792: Through the marriage of Madeleine de Montchenu with Hector Milliet de Challes, who held the titles of marquises of Arvilars and of la Poëpe. The castle was in ruins.
- 1792 — August 1796 (Thermidor Year IV): Confiscation of the property by the French revolutionaries and purchase by Étienne-François Pissard.

== See also ==
- Medieval fortification
- Fortification

== Bibliography ==
- Blondel, Louis (1978). Châteaux de l'ancien diocèse de Genève [Castles of the former diocese of Geneva] (in French). Vol. 7. Société d'histoire et d'archéologie de Genève. pp. 289–298.
- Chalmin-Sirot, Elisabeth (1998). Résidences seigneuriales au Moyen âge : comté de Genève, Faucigny, Chablais, Haute-Savoie [Seigneurial residences in the Middle Ages: County of Geneva, Faucigny, Chablais, Haute-Savoie]. Travaux & documents (in French). Presses universitaires de Lyon. ISBN 978-2-7297-0604-3.
- Chapier, Georges (1961). Châteaux savoyards : Faucigny et Chablais [Savoyard castles: Faucigny and Chablais] (in French). Vol. 5. Grenoble: Éditions Revue Les Alpes.
- Duparc, Pierre (1978). Le comté de Genève, (IXe – XVe siècles) [The County of Geneva (9th–15th centuries)]. Mémoires et documents (in French). Vol. XXXIX. Geneva: Société d’histoire et d’archéologie de Genève.
- Duval, César (1977). Ternier et Saint-Julien. Essai historique sur les anciens bailliages de Ternier et Gaillard et le district révolutionnaire de Carouge, avec documents inédits [Ternier and Saint-Julien. Historical essay on the former bailiwicks of Ternier and Gaillard and the revolutionary district of Carouge, with unpublished documents] (in French). H. Georg.
- Jacquet, Abel (1978). Saint-Julien-en-Genevois : histoire d'un bourg de province des origines à nos jours [Saint-Julien-en-Genevois: history of a provincial town from its origins to the present day] (in French).
- Menabrea, Léon (1865). Des origines féodales dans les Alpes occidentales [Feudal origins in the Western Alps] (in French). Imprimerie royale.
- Payraud, Nicolas (2009). "Châteaux, espace et société en Dauphiné et en Savoie du milieu du XIIIe siècle à la fin du XVe siècle" [Castles, space, and society in Dauphiné and Savoie from the mid-13th century to the end of the 15th century] (PDF). HAL - Archives Ouvertes (in French).
- Stubenvoll, Marianne (1994). "Niveaux et répartition des fortunes dans les pays de Vaud, Gex, Ternier-Gaillard et Thonon en 1550" [Levels and distribution of wealth in the cantons of Vaud, Gex, Ternier-Gaillard, and Thonon in 1550]. Revue suisse d'histoire (in French): 43–87.

=== Archival collections ===
- "SA - Comptes des chatellenies, des subsides, des revenus et des judicatures" [SA - Accounts of the chatellenies, subsidies, revenues, and judicatures.] (in French). Archived from the original on June 12, 2018.
- "Inventaire-Index des comptes de châtellenies et de subsides (conservés aux Archives départementales de la Savoie et de la Haute-Savoie) Série SA" [Inventory-Index of accounts of castellanies and subsidies (held at the Departmental Archives of Savoie and Haute-Savoie) Series SA] (PDF) (in French). pp. 212–221.
