= Château de Sallanches =

Fortified structure

- de Castro, de la Motte, Bourbonge(s), de Cordon
- Interactive map of Château de Sallanches
- Location: Country: France; Former provinces of the Duchy of Savoy: Faucigny; Region: Auvergne-Rhône-Alpes; Department: Haute-Savoie; Municipality: Cordon
- Coordinates: 45°55′58″N 6°37′26″E
- Type: Castle
- Beginning date: Before the 13th century
- More information: Original owner: Sires de Faucigny; Current use: Ruined

The Château de Sallanches, also known as “de Castro,” “de la Motte,” “de Bourbonge(s),” or “de Cordon,” was a fortified structure likely constructed before the 13th century. It overlooks the town of Sallanches and is now situated within the commune of Cordon, in the department of Haute-Savoie, in the Auvergne–Rhône-Alpes region. From the 13th to the 15th century, it served as the seat of a châtellenie.

== Location ==
The Château de Sallanches was located west of, and at a higher elevation than, the town of Sallanches, at approximately 670 m. As the administrative center, it was positioned outside the urban enclosure. The site now lies within the commune of Cordon, which explains the parallel designation “Château de Cordon.” The castle did not generate a substantial settlement cluster. Urban development in the area took place primarily on the plain at Sallanches, while Cordon expanded higher on the slopes, alongside nearby villages such as Saint-Roch. The principal religious center of the area is the Collegiate Church of Saint-Jacques in Sallanches.

According to the local scholar Lucien Guy (1890–1975), the site’s location may correspond to “that of Bourbonge […] if one compares it with the various constructions of the Burgundian period and their strategic situation.” The fortification was situated on a hill between the deeply incised ravines of the Frasse (or de la Croix) and the Sallanche. The remains of the structure were identified through the work of the Swiss archaeologist Louis Blondel, confirming the association between the medieval fortified castle and the Château de Bourbonge.

The toponym “Le Château” preserves the memory of this former fortification.

== History ==
From the 12th century onward, the castle belonged to the lords of Faucigny, who governed the Arve valley, itself known as Faucigny.

Pierre of Savoy, the husband of Agnes of Faucigny, had the castle fortified before 1263.

The castle subsequently likely passed to the lords of Gex, a family connected to the Faucigny and their successors, and then in 1339 to the Dauphins of Viennois. Humbert II of Viennois granted it in fief in 1345 to his aunt Béatrice de Châlon (1273–1347), born Béatrix de La Tour du Pin and Princess of Orange. In 1355, the castle became part of the domains of the House of Savoy following the incorporation of Faucigny.

After this transition, during a period of relative peace, the châtelains abandoned the castle and resided in the town of Sallanches. In 1360, Béatrice sold the property to Humbert de la Porte, who had also served as châtelain of Charousse at Passy.

Ten years later, Count Janus of Geneva, Baron of Faucigny, granted the property in fief to his uncle Pierre, known as the Bastard of Geneva, son of Count William III of Geneva. In 1426, it was acquired by Pierre de Menthon. From 1457 onward, the castle was known as Bourbonge(s), referring to a cadet branch of the Menthon family. This lineage retained rights over the estate until 1746, despite the creation in 1700 of a separate marquisate of Cordon in favor of Philibert de Saluce, Count of La Tour. Bourbonge was subsequently sold to Joachim de la Grange, lord of Taninges, whose son Joseph-Nicolas de la Grange sold it in 1769.

Under Savoyard administration, part of the castle belonged to the count, while other portions within the enclosure were held by noble families, including the Menthon. According to Louis Blondel, the entire castle eventually came under their control, as in 1467 Claude de Menthon rendered homage for the castle to the Duke of Savoy.

As the castle fell into ruin and its location was forgotten, historians came to identify the former center of the châtellenie of Sallanches with the Château de Montrosset, although this site was only a fortified house, also known as the Maison Brêche.

== Description ==
Louis Blondel, using sources including the Sardinian Map (1728–1738), proposed a plan for the castle on the northern part of the hill, associated with a leveled area—the outer bailey—known as La Motte or Le Châtel, where a church and a chapel were located in the southern section. The enquête delphinale of 1339 indicates that the castle had two entrances, one of which, facing the valley and Sallanches, was called La Motte and provided access to the outer bailey; Blondel suggested this may have been a fortified gate. Today, only the ruins of an offset tower, likely a watchtower, remain overlooking the ravine of the Sallanche. Little evidence survives regarding the layout of the outer bailey, with only the historical record of a church dedicated to the Virgin, under the title of Notre-Dame-du-Château. The chapel has since been replaced by a farmhouse.

Archaeological evidence indicates that the fortification consisted of a complex with a tower and, at its center, a second square enclosure measuring 21 by 19 meters, which included a keep. The enclosure of the keep was likely partially constructed of wood, according to châtellenie accounts, and appears to have been reinforced in the second half of the 14th century.

The châtelain resided in the keep, historically referred to as the “house of Gex” before 1355. The earliest mention of this house dates to 1286. It was later described as a tower and currently forms part of a farmhouse. In the northeast corner of the house of Gex, a rectangular tower measuring 8 by 5 meters is partially preserved. Historical accounts also indicate the presence of a stable or cowshed, latrines, and a prison constructed around 1357–1358.

A road now crosses the former leveled area of the castle.

The Château de Sallanches is currently divided into multiple private properties.

== Châtellenie of Sallanches and the Land of Gex in Faucigny ==
=== Organization ===
The Château de Sallanches served as the center of a châtellenie, or mandement, of Faucigny, established from the 13th century onward, possibly at the end of the previous century. Its original name was the Land of Gex, or the Land of Gex in Faucigny.

At the end of the 12th century, Faucigny appears to have been organized into nine châtellenies, (Note: List of the nine castellanies in order of precedence: Cluses and Châtillon, Bonneville, Bonne, Sallanches, Faucigny, Le Châtelet du Crédoz, Samoëns, Montjoie, and Flumet.) with Sallanches ranking fourth in the order of precedence, according to the inventory of the titles of Faucigny (1431), as cited by Canon Jean-Louis Grillet.

The territory of the châtellenie corresponded to the present-day communes of Sallanches, Combloux, Cordon, Domancy, and Magland, encompassing the central part of the middle Arve Valley between Cluses and the confluence of the Arve and the Bonnant, as well as the eastern slope of the Aravis massif on the left bank of the Arve.

Villages, parishes, fortifications of the châtellenie of Sallanches
Commune	Name	Type
Combloux	La Tour	other
Cordon	Château de Sallanches	castle
Cordon	Château Vif	castle
Cordon	Châtelard	castle
Magland	La Tour Clerton	fortified house
Magland	La Tour Noire	fortified house
Magland	Château called Tour de Bellegarde	fortified house
Magland	Fortified house of Loche	fortified house
Magland	Fortified house of the Crochet	fortified house
Sallanches	Castle called Tour de Bellegarde	castle
Sallanches	Château de Malsain	fortified house
Sallanches	Château de Montagny or Montrosset	castle
Sallanches	Château des Rubins	castle
Sallanches	Fortified house of Vorzier	fortified house
Sallanches	Tour de Chissé	fortified house
Sallanches	Castle or tower of Disonche	fortified house
Sallanches	Castle or tower of La Frasse	fortified house
Sallanches	Tour de Servoz	other

During the Dauphiné period, Faucigny was organized (from 1342–1343) into fifteen châtellenies, including Sallanches. The mandement of Terre de Gex comprised 29 fortified houses, four fortified manors, and a castle.

Following the incorporation of Faucigny into the County of Savoy, Sallanches remained the seat of a châtellenie, known as the châtellenie of Sallanches. The administrative functions, including the offices of the bailli and the juge-mage for Faucigny, were transferred to the town of Sallanches.

=== Châtelains ===
In the barony of Faucigny and later in the County of Savoy, the châtelain was an “officer appointed for a defined period, revocable and removable.” The châtelain was responsible for administering the châtellenie or mandement, collecting the domain’s fiscal revenues, and overseeing the maintenance of the castle. He was sometimes assisted by a financial receiver, who drafted a clean copy of the annual report submitted by the châtelain or his lieutenant.

Châtelains of Sallanches and the Land of Gex in Faucigny, then of Sallanches, from the 13th to the 17th century
Under Dauphiné, then French administration
- 1283–1296: Obert de Bardonneche, also châtelain of Flumet
- 1317–1319: Pierre Vuagnard
- 1325–1326: Jean de La Rochette
- 1337–1338: Jean des Bauges, also châtelain of Montjoie, and Pierre de Bogio

Under Savoyard administration

- 1355–1356: Pierre de Hauteville and Pierre de la Porte, co-châtelains, also with the Land of Gex
- 1355–1358 (?): Viffrey Forrier de Tournon; lieutenant Nantermet Chambrier (1357–1358)
- 1358 (?)–1361: Humbert de la Porte
- 1361–1363: Udrisset de Chissé, for Angelon de la Porte, for whom he acted as guardian
- 1364–1370: Guillaume de Cors
- 1370–1371: Viffrey Forrier de Tournon
- 1373–1375: Aymon de Chaland
- 1375–1376: Étienne Orsier
- 1377–1380: Aymon de Chaland
- 1380–1384: Cornu
- 1384–1389: Pierre de Ponte
- 1389–1392: Jacques de Ponte, son of the previous châtelain
- 1392–1425: Antoine de Crescherel (Crécherel); lieutenants François de Chamonix (1393–1394), Pierre du Châtelard (1396–1401), Aymon de la Rive (1401–1402), Pasquelet Constantin (1403–1404), Pierre de l’Oche (1404–1414), Janin Quinerit (1414–1415), Pierre de Crécherel (1415–1416), Guichard de Curvillion (1417–1418), Pierre de la Frasse (1423–1425)
- 1425–1427: Amédée de Crescherel (Crécherel); lieutenant Jean Quinerit
- 1427–1428: Amédée and Claude de Crescherel (Crécherel), brothers and co-châtelains, sons of the previous châtelain; lieutenant Janin Quinerit
- 1428–1437: Amédée de Crécherel, also châtelain of Ternier (1429–1433); lieutenants Robert Maréchal (1428–1434) and Angelon de Telleneys (1434–1437)
- 1437–1450: Jacob de Chissé; lieutenants Guichard de Chissé (1437–1438), Jean de Ronsier (1438–1441), Petromand de Chissé (1441–1444), Pierre de Vurzier (1444–1446), Jean d’Auberes (1446–1450)
- 1450–1451: Pierre Quinerit de Sallanches
- 1465–1484: Master Bertrand de Dereya (de Dérée), President of the Council of Genevois (1465–1484) (Note: Bertrand de Dérée was a magistrate from the noble Dérée family, lord of the said place, former vice-judge mage and then President of the Council of Genevois until his death.)
- 1484–1505: Jean de Genève, lord of Lullin, also châtelain of Mornex (1488–1498) and Rumilly-sous-Cornillon (1483–1515)
- 1505–1512: Michaud Botolier
- 1512–1530: Jean de Genève, lord of Lullin, also châtelain of Rumilly-sous-Cornillon (1483–1515)

Administration of the apanage of Genevois (1514–1659)

- 1530–1531: Noble Aymon Puthod
- 1531–1535: Noble Raymond de Bieu
- 1534–1538: Nobles Raymond de Bieu and Jacques Cohennet
- 1538–1541: Noble Jacques Cohennet
- 1541–1544: Nobles Charles-François de La Frasse and Claude de Riddes
- 1544–1547: Noble Pierre Berchat
- 1547–1550: Noble Nicolas-François de La Frasse
- 1550–1553: Noble Guillaume (I) de Riddes
- 1553–1556: Noble Pierre Berchat
- 1555–1559: Master (Note: Master is a title associated with “prosecutors, notaries, practitioners and commissioners.”) or Noble Bernard Andan
- 1559–1565: Noble Jacques de Bieu
- 1565–1566: Noble Pierre Berchat
- 1566–1568: Noble Jacques Cohennet
- 1568–1571: Noble Aymé Anseney
- 1568–1571: Noble Gabriel Du Fresney
- 1571–1577: Noble Jean Solliard
- 1577–1580: Noble Raymond-Charles de Cornillon
- 1580–1592: Noble Nicolas Du Coudrey
- 1592–1598: Master Nicolas Viollat
- 1598–1604: Noble Nicolas Du Coudrey de Blancheville and Master Jean Quart
- 1604–1610: Master Nicolas Viollat
- 1610–1616: Noble Nicolas Du Coudrey de Blancheville and Master François Jay
- 1616–1622: Noble Nicolas de Cornillon, who delegated the office to Master Antoine Gros
- 1622–1628: Noble Nicolas de Cornillon
- 1628–1634: Master Nicolas Peyraud
- 1640–1646: Master Jean Peyraud, with the lease of the lods
- 1640–1646: Master Nicolas Peyraud
- 1646–1652: Master Georges Dherens
- 1646–1652: Master Nicolas Mailliet
- 1658–1659: Noble Aymé II Du Fresney

== See also ==
- House of Faucigny
- Medieval fortification
- Castle
- Fortification

== Bibliography ==
- Baud, Henri; Mariotte, Jean-Yves; Guerrier, Alain (1980). Histoire des communes savoyardes : Le Faucigny [History of Savoyard municipalities: Le Faucigny] (in French). Roanne: Éditions Horvath. ISBN 2-7171-0159-4.
- Blondel, Louis (1978). Châteaux de l'ancien diocèse de Genève [Castles of the former diocese of Geneva] (in French). Vol. 7. Société d'histoire et d'archéologie de Genève. pp. 289–298.
- Carrier, Nicolas; de La Corbière, Matthieu (2005). Entre Genève et Mont-Blanc au XIVe siècle : enquête et contre-enquête dans le Faucigny delphinal de 1339 [Between Geneva and Mont Blanc in the 14th century: investigation and counter-investigation in the Dauphin's Faucigny in 1339] (in French). Librairie Droz. ISBN 978-2-88442-019-8.
- Chapier, Georges (2005). Châteaux Savoyards : Faucigny, Chablais, Tarentaise, Maurienne, Savoie propre, Genevois [Savoyard castles: Faucigny, Chablais, Tarentaise, Maurienne, Savoie propre, Genevois]. L'amateur Averti (in French). La Rochelle: Éditions La Découvrance. ISBN 978-2-84265-326-2.
- Guy, Lucien (1929). "Les anciens châteaux du Faucigny" [The ancient castles of Faucigny]. Mémoires & documents (in French). 47.
- Payraud, Nicolas (2009). "Châteaux, espace et société en Dauphiné et en Savoie du milieu du XIIIe siècle à la fin du XVe siècle" [Castles, space, and society in Dauphiné and Savoie from the mid-13th century to the end of the 15th century] (PDF). HAL - Archives Ouvertes (in French).
- Pierre, James (2003). Histoire de Sallanches, Saint-Roch et Cordon : Histoire civile et religieuse [History of Sallanches, Saint-Roch, and Cordon: Civil and Religious History]. Monographies des villes et villages de France (in French). Paris: Livre d'histoire. ISBN 978-2-843-73204-1.
- Regat, Christian; Aubert, François (1999). Châteaux de Haute-Savoie : Chablais, Faucigny, Genevois [Castles of Haute-Savoie: Chablais, Faucigny, Genevois] (in French). Éditions Cabédita. pp. 57–58. ISBN 978-2-88295-117-5.

=== Archival collections ===
- "Fonds de la tour de Douvres" [Dover Tower Fund]. FranceArchives (in French).
- "Inventaire-Index des comptes de châtellenie et de subsides" [Inventory-Index of accounts for the castellany and subsidies] (PDF). Archives départementales de la Savoie (in French).
