= Château de Monthoux =

Fortified castle in France

Coordinates: 45°57′17″N 6°07′15″E

- Interactive map of Château de Monthoux
- Location: Country: France; Former provinces of the Duchy of Savoy: Faucigny; Region: Auvergne-Rhône-Alpes; Department: Haute-Savoie; Municipality: Vétraz-Monthoux
- Type: Castle
- Beginning date: before 1245

The Château de Monthoux (also spelled Montoux, Monthouz, or Monthous) is a former fortified castle built in the mid-13th century. It is located in the commune of Vétraz-Monthoux, in the department of Haute-Savoie, within the Auvergne–Rhône-Alpes region. From the 13th to the 15th century, it served as the seat of a châtellenie.

== Location ==
The castle was constructed on a hill at the entrance to the Arve Valley, overlooking Annemasse and positioned between the Voirons to the northeast and the Petit Salève to the southwest. It occupies the northern end of the hill, oriented toward the northeast, in an area known as Haut Monthoux. Located at an elevation of 567 metres, it overlooked the Arve below and controlled the roads linking Annemasse to Bonne and to Bonneville.

Opposite the site stands the Château de Mornex, which controlled the opposite bank of the valley and belonged to the lords of Geneva.

According to historian Alfred Fierro, in his thesis Les enquêtes de 1339 en Dauphiné et en Faucigny, intérêt démographique, the castle was situated about one league from Geneva, with a vantage point from which the entire city was visible, making it difficult to leave Geneva without being seen from the castle.

The castle's chapel belonged to the bishopric of Geneva, which became a source of tension between the Baron of Faucigny and the bishop.

== History ==
The Swiss archaeologist Louis Blondel suggests that the hill may have hosted an earlier fortification. The site was developed “shortly before 1245” by Aymon II, Baron of Faucigny, who established the town and the Château de Monthoux on the border with the County of Geneva, alongside other new settlements such as the villeneuves and the Château d'Hermance. Each of these settlements was accompanied by a castle. Pope Innocent IV authorized the creation of a chapel within the Château de Monthoux. The estate belonged to the Faucigny family, first to Aymon II, then to his daughter Agnès, who married Peter of Savoy. It later passed to their daughter Beatrice, known as the “Great Dauphine,” who married Guigues VII, Dauphin of Viennois.

Dauphine Béatrice pledged the castle in 1269 while she was held captive by her aunt, and in 1270 it passed in pledge to her uncle, Count Philip I. In May 1293, Béatrice of Faucigny transferred the property to her cousin, Count Amadeus V of Savoy. The following month, the Great Dauphine performed homage to the Count of Savoy for the castle.

The construction of the Château de Gaillard in 1304 was challenged by Hugues, lord of Faucigny and son of the Dauphin of Viennois, Humbert I, who claimed that the structure had been built on his lands. The Count of Geneva disputed this claim, as the new castle posed an issue for the Château de Monthoux, which controlled the northern entrance to Faucigny. An agreement was reached during a meeting at the Château de Mornex on 13 October 1304. The two lords stipulated that the castles of Monthoux and Gaillard owed each other mutual protection and would provide support in the event of an attack by the Count of Savoy.

During the peace treaty concluded in August 1308 between the Count of Savoy and the Great Dauphine Beatrice, the castles of Faucigny, Bonne, Monthoux, Bonneville, Châtelet-de-Crédoz, Alinge-le-Vieux, and Lullin, along with their mandements and jurisdictions, were included in the agreement.

On 22 April 1532, Michel de Viry sold the castle and its mandement to Michel Guillet for 1,400 gold écus, plus 600 gold écus for redemption rights and the rights to redeem the tithes near Collonges. The new owners subsequently adopted the name Guillet de Monthoux.

== Description ==
The castrum comprised a keep with its enclosing wall, a village situated below, and a church, all contained within a fortified perimeter.

According to Louis Blondel, the Retable of Saint Peter by Konrad Witz (1444) includes a landscape featuring the castle. The depiction shows a substantial keep, estimated at 29 × 29 metres, surmounted by a taller tower.

== Châtellenie of Monthoux ==
The Château de Monthoux served as the center of a châtellenie, or mandement, within the seigneury of Faucigny. During the Delphinal period (1342–1343), Faucigny was organized into fifteen châtellenies, one of which was Monthoux.

In the 14th century, the châtellenie encompassed the parishes of Haut- and Bas-Monthoux, Annemasse, Ambilly, Sales, and Vétraz.

Villages, parishes, fortifications of the castellany of Monthoux
Municipality	Name	Type
Étrembières	Terreaux or Châtillon Castle	castle
Vétraz-Monthoux	Monthoux Castle	castle

In the County of Savoy, the châtelain was an officer appointed for a fixed term, revocable and removable. The office was responsible for managing the châtellenie or mandement, collecting fiscal revenues, and maintaining the castle.

Châtelains of Hermance, 14th to 15th century
- 26 July 1332 – 22 March 1335: Aymon and Humbersier de Pontverre, co-châtelains and co-receivers;
- 22 March 1335 – 4 December 1335: Humbersier de Pontverre;
- 18 April 1355 – 7 June 1362: Pierre de Saint-Joyre called Porchaton;
- 9 August 1437 – 21 January 1445: Guillaume Bolomier, lord of Nercy, châtelain and receiver.

== See also ==
- House of Faucigny
- Medieval fortification
- Castle
- Fortification

== Bibliography ==
- Baud, Henri; Mariotte, Jean-Yves; Guerrier, Alain (1980). Histoire des communes savoyardes : Le Faucigny [History of Savoyard municipalities: Le Faucigny] (in French). Roanne: Éditions Horvath. pp. 128–130. ISBN 2-7171-0159-4.
- Blondel, Louis (1978). Châteaux de l'ancien diocèse de Genève [Castles of the former diocese of Geneva] (in French). Vol. 7. Société d'histoire et d'archéologie de Genève. pp. 299 et seq.
- Chapier, Georges (2005). Châteaux Savoyards : Faucigny, Chablais, Tarentaise, Maurienne, Savoie propre, Genevois [Savoyard castles: Faucigny, Chablais, Tarentaise, Maurienne, Savoie propre, Genevois]. L'amateur Averti (in French). La Découvrance. pp. 35–38. ISBN 978-2-84265-326-2.
- Gavard, Guy (2006). Histoire d'Annemasse et des communes voisines : les relations avec Genève de l'époque romaine à l'an 2000 [History of Annemasse and neighboring towns: relations with Geneva from Roman times to the year 2000]. Les Savoisiennes (in French). Montmélian: La Fontaine de Siloé. ISBN 978-2-84206-342-9.
- Payraud, Nicolas (2009). "Châteaux, espace et société en Dauphiné et en Savoie du milieu du XIIIe siècle à la fin du XVe siècle" [Castles, space, and society in Dauphiné and Savoie from the mid-13th century to the end of the 15th century] (PDF). HAL - Archives Ouvertes (in French).

=== Archival collections ===
- "SA - Comptes des chatellenies, des subsides, des revenus et des judicatures" [SA - Accounts of the chatellenies, subsidies, revenues, and judicatures.] (in French). Archived from the original on June 12, 2018.
- "Inventaire-Index des comptes de châtellenies et de subsides (conservés aux Archives départementales de la Savoie et de la Haute-Savoie) Série SA" [Inventory-Index of accounts of castellanies and subsidies (held at the Departmental Archives of Savoie and Haute-Savoie) Series SA] (PDF) (in French). pp. 395–404.
