= Treaty of Paris (1355) =

1355 treaty between Savoy and France

The Treaty of Paris was signed in 1355 between Amadeus VI, Count of Savoy and the first dauphin, future Charles V of France. Overall, the treaty benefited Savoy financially and politically by expanding and consolidating its territory, and it benefited France by ending dispute with Savoy and gaining it as an ally in the war against England.

The dauphin ceded to Savoy the "entire barony of Faucigny, the barony of Gex and its dependencies in the Valromey, the homage of the count of Geneva, suzerainty over all fiefs located in the Genevois, as well as the Valbonne... [and] everything belonging to the dauphin between the rivers Ain and Albarine on the approaches to Bresse and Bugey".

Savoy surrendered holdings in the Viennois, and Amadeus renounced his engagement with an heiress of Burgundy to instead marry Bonne of Bourbon, bringing Savoy into closer alliance with the Valois king of France, John the Good.

The swap of territories meant that local nobles would have to shift their allegiances from the dauphin to the Count of Savoy, and it was therefore initially resisted. For example, Amadeus III of Geneva objected to the treaty because he would have to pay homage to Amadeus VI, his former ward. But the treaty was quickly enforced by the dauphin, who was eager to secure Savoy's troops to fight against Edward the Black Prince.

== See also ==
- The Hundred Years War
- List of treaties

== Sources ==
- Cox, Eugene L. (1967). The Green Count of Savoy. Princeton, New Jersey: Princeton University Press. pp. 103–114. LCCN 67-11030.
