= Agnes of Faucigny =

Countess of Savoy

- suo jure Dame of Faucigny; Countess consort of Savoy
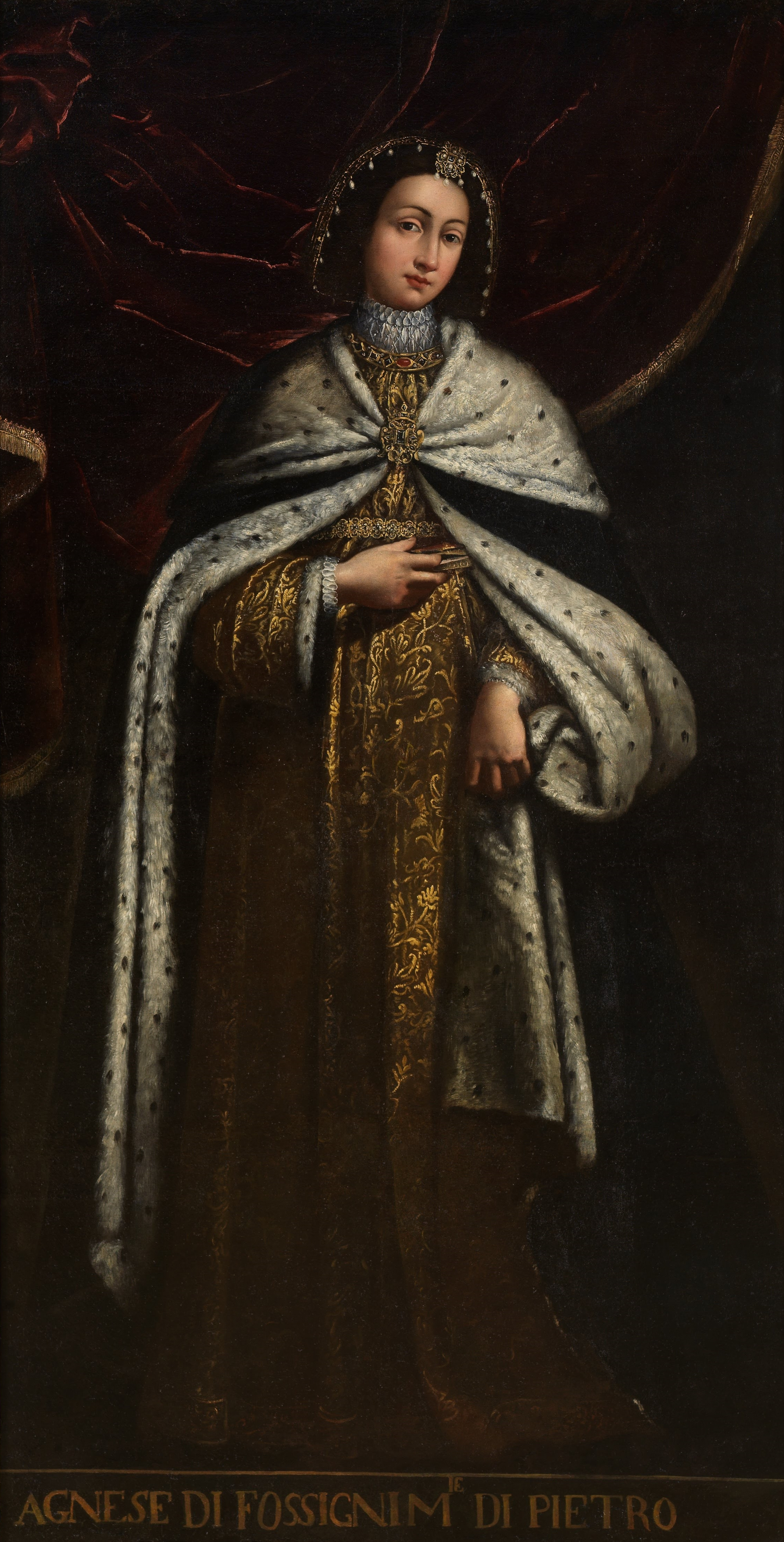
- Died: 11 August 1268
- Buried: Faucigny
- Noble family: House of Savoy
- Spouse: Peter II, Count of Savoy
- Issue: Beatrice, Dame of Faucigny
- Father: Aymon II, Seigneur de Faucigny
- Mother: Beatrice d'Auxonne

Agnes of Faucigny (died 11 August 1268) was suo jure ruling Dame of Faucigny from 1253, as well as countess consort of Savoy by marriage to Peter II, Count of Savoy.

== Life ==
She was born the eldest daughter of Aymon II, Seigneur de Faucigny, and Beatrix d'Auxonne. From her father, she was descended from the Seigneur de Faucigny and the Counts of Geneva. Her siblings were a younger sister, Beatrice, and an illegitimate brother, Aymon de Faucigny; therefore, her father appointed her heir in default of male heirs.

Betrothed in February 1234, Agnes was married to Peter II, Count of Savoy sometime after 25 June 1236. Her husband succeeded as Count of Savoy in 1263, making her Countess of Savoy, a position she would enjoy for five years until her death.

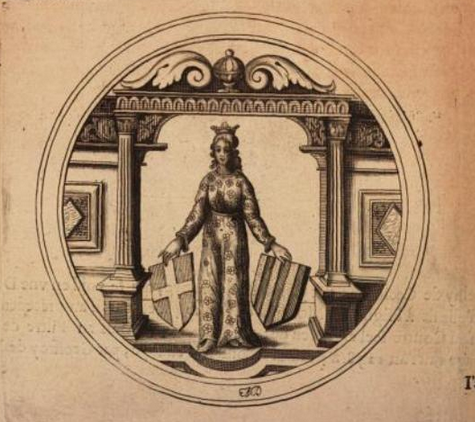
Seal of Agnes, Lady of Fauciny.

She had a daughter, Beatrice or Beatrix (c. 1237 – 21 November 1310), who married firstly Guigues VII of Viennois and secondly Gaston VII of Béarn; but due to the Salic law of succession, Beatrice was excluded from the succession to the County of Savoy, which would pass to Philip I, Count of Savoy after her husband's death. Originally intending to give a third of her inheritance to her daughter Beatrice and two thirds to her husband Peter, Agnes instead named her daughter as the sole heir to her lands in Faucigny, together with her daughter's husband, the Dauphin de Viennois. This would lead to a future territorial dispute between the House of Savoy and the Dauphin de Viennois over the territory, which the House of Savoy won back from the French at the Treaty of Paris (1355).

She died on 11 August 1268 and was buried at Abbaye de Contamine-sur-Arve, Faucigny.

== Ancestry ==
Ancestors of Agnes of Faucigny

16. Rodolphe, Seigneur de Faucigny
8. Aymon I, Seigneur de Faucigny
4. Henri II, Seigneur de Faucigny
9. Clementia
2. Aymon II, Seigneur de Faucigny
20. Aymon I, Count of Geneva
10. Amadeus I of Geneva
5. Comtesson de Geneva
11. X de Domène
1. Agnes of Faucigny
24. William III of Mâcon
12. Stephen II of Auxonne
25. Poncette-Alice de Traves
6. Stephen III of Auxonne
26. Matthias I, Duke of Lorraine
13. Judith de Lorraine
27. Judith-Bertha of Swabia
3. Beatrice of Burgundy
28. William I, Count of Chalon
14. William II, Count of Chalon
7. Beatrice, Countess of Chalon

== Notes ==
Preceded by Cecile of Baux	Countess of Savoy; 1263–1268	Succeeded by Adelaide of Burgundy
