= Beatrice of Savoy, Dame of Faucigny =

Dame of Faucigny

Beatrice
- suo jure Dame of Faucigny; Dauphine of Viennois; Viscountess of Béarn
- Coat-of-arms of Savoy
- Born: c.1237
- Died: 21 April 1310; Faucigny
- Buried: Faucigny
- Noble family: House of Savoy
- Spouses: Guigues VII of Viennois; Gaston VII of Béarn
- Issue: John I, Dauphin of Viennois; Anne, Dauphine of Viennois
- Father: Peter II, Count of Savoy
- Mother: Agnes of Faucigny

Beatrice of Savoy (c. 1237 – 21 April 1310) ruled as Lady of Faucigny from 1268, having succeeded her mother, Agnes of Faucigny. She was the only legitimate child of Peter II, Count of Savoy, but did not inherit the county, which passed instead to her uncle. Beatrice was also Dauphine of Viennois and Viscountess of Béarn by her two marriages.

== First marriage ==
In 1253 Beatrice was married to Guigues VII of Viennois, they had been betrothed to each other since 1241, the marriage being the work of Beatrice's maternal grandfather Aymon II, Seigneur de Faucigny.

The subject of Beatrice's inheritance was soon raised. Her mother Agnes, had originally intended to give a third of the inheritance to her daughter and two thirds to her husband Peter. However, she changed her will and named Beatrice as the sole heir of her lands in Faucigny along with Beatrice's husband Guigues. Beatrice's parents died in 1268. Beatrice and her husband, however, only inherited some of the lands that had belonged to her mother. Beatrice was forced to give up Thoire-Villars to her aunt, also named Beatrice. The claim of Beatrice to all of her mother's inheritance was strong considering the power of Guigues. However, due to exclusion of women from succession to Savoy, the county passed to her uncle, Philip I. Philip supported Beatrice's aunt in the Faucigny inheritance dispute, leading to a war. Beatrice was captured and imprisoned. She was forced to cede a portion of her inheritance to her aunt and pay homage to Savoy throughout the 1290s.

In 1269, Guigues died and due to the minority of their son John, Beatrice was appointed his regent. Her son was married to Bonne, daughter of Amadeus V, Count of Savoy, who was a cousin of Beatrice. However, her son died after a fall from a horse aged around eighteen. He was eventually succeeded by Beatrice's older daughter Anne and her husband Humbert, with future dauphins descending from their marriage. Following the death of her son, Beatrice left for Taninges with his remains, laying them to rest there and praying for his soul in the monastery she founded, Mélan.

== Second marriage and widowhood ==
Beatrice was married for a second time on April 2, 1273 to Gaston VII, Viscount of Béarn. Her second marriage is confirmed by the agreement dated 15 December 1284 under which Gaston makes an agreement with Anne and Humbert over his claim on the County of Vienne. Beatrice arranged a marriage for stepdaughter Constance of Béarn to Aymon II of Geneva, a relative through her grandmother. Gaston had dealt with domestic problems amongst his daughters from his first marriage and which would succeed him upon death, his sons-in-law Roger-Bernard III, Count of Foix and Gerald VI, Count of Armagnac had battled for power. The marriage between Beatrice and Gaston did not produce any children. After seventeen years of marriage, Gaston died and was succeeded by his son-in-law, Roger-Bernard.

Beatrice did not remarry after the death of her second husband but did have more political involvement with her family back in Savoy. In 1294, she transferred her lands between Seyssel and Freiburg to her cousin Count Amadeus V. In 1296, she gave up her title as Dame of Faucigny to her son-in-law Humbert, for the benefit of one of his sons, reserving the usufruct for herself. Beatrice continued to be a powerful force in Savoy, causing torment for her cousin Amadeus especially, when she attempted to claim Savoy for her grandson Hugh. However, the claim proved unsuccessful and Amadeus remained count for the rest of his lifetime.

Beatrice died on 21 April 1310 and was buried at her monastery in Melun beside her son. Her various alliances with relatives and clerics in Geneva and the sharing out of her inheritance during and after her life, led to conflicts amongst her descendants for generations. The disputes between the House of Savoy and Dauphin de Viennois over the territory which the House of Savoy won back from the French in the Treaty of Paris (1355).

== Issue ==
- Anne (1255–1298), later successor, married in 1273 to Humbert de la Tour du Pin
- Catherine (died after 25 January 1307), mentioned in her father's will and testament
- John I (1264–1282), his successor
- Andrew (1267 – c. 1270)
