= Châtelain =

French title for the keeper of a castle

Châtelain (Note: from Latin: castellanus, derived from castellum; pertaining to a castle, fortress. Middle English: castellan from Anglo-Norman: castellain and Old French: castelain) was originally the French title for the keeper of a castle.

== History ==
With the growth of the feudal system, the title gained in France a special significance which it never acquired in England since the Norman conquest, as implying the jurisdiction of which the castle became the centre. The châtelain was originally, in Carolingian times, an official of the comte (count); with the development of feudalism the office became a fief, and so ultimately hereditary. In this as in other respects the châtelain was the equivalent of the viscount. Sometimes the two titles were combined, but more usually there were no viscounts in provinces where châtelains existed and no châtelains in those with viscounts.

The title châtelain continued also to be applied to the inferior officer, or concierge châtelain, who was merely a castellan in the English sense. The power and status of châtelains necessarily varied greatly at different periods and places. Usually their rank in the feudal hierarchy was equivalent to that of the "Sire" (medieval French) or lord (Latin: dominus), between the baron and the chevalier; but occasionally they were great nobles with an extensive jurisdiction, as in the Low Countries (see Burgrave).

This variation was most marked in the cities, where in the struggle for power that of the châtelain depended on the success with which he could assert himself against his feudal superior, lay or ecclesiastical, or, from the 12th century onwards, against the rising power of the communes. The châtellenie (casteliania), or jurisdiction of the châtelain, as a territorial division for certain judicial and administrative purposes, survived the disappearance of the title and office of the châtelain in France, and continued until the Revolution.

== Châtelaine ==
The feminine form, châtelaine, refers to the mistress of a castle or château, or the mistress of any large medieval household. It can also refer to a woman's ornamental chain worn around the waist, with keys, a purse, timepiece, or other household attachments.

=== Canada ===
In Canada, the wife of the Governor General (the Viceregal consort of Canada), is referred to by the nominal and symbolic title "Châtelaine of Rideau Hall", in diplomatic and ceremonial protocol for Canadian and British government ceremonies and special events.

== Notes and references ==
=== References ===
- Achille Luchaire, Manuel des institutions françaises (Paris, 1892).
- Du Cange, Glossarium, s. Castellanus.
