= Château de Châtillon-sur-Cluses =

Fortified castle in France

Château de Châtillon
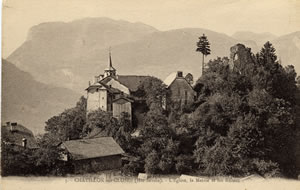
- The ruins of the tower appear on the right in the vegetation.
- Interactive map of Château de Châtillon
- Location: Country: France; Former provinces of the Duchy of Savoy: Faucigny; Region: Auvergne-Rhône-Alpes; Department: Haute-Savoie; Municipality: Châtillon-sur-Cluses
- Coordinates: 46°05′04″N 6°34′59″E
- Type: Castle
- Purpose: Original: Seigneurial residence Current: Ruined

The Château de Châtillon is a former fortified castle dating from the 12th century, with several later modifications. Its ruins are located in the commune of Châtillon-sur-Cluses, in the Haute-Savoie department of the Auvergne-Rhône-Alpes region. Between the 13th and 16th centuries, the castle served as the seat of a châtellenie comprising thirteen parishes and later became the administrative center of the Faucigny bailliage.

== Location ==
The remains of the Château de Châtillon are located in Châtillon-sur-Cluses, Haute-Savoie, on a limestone spur at 862 meters above sea level. The castle controlled the Col de Châtillon (741 meters), situated at the junction of the routes from Cluses to Taninges and from Samoëns to Bonneville, occupying a central position in the Faucigny region between the Giffre and Arve valleys.

The rock extends southward into a rounded grassy mound known as the “Cuar,” which provides a panoramic view of the Arve valley.

== History ==
The mound known as the “Cuar” may have been the site of an earlier wooden fortification. According to the Swiss archaeologist Louis Blondel (1956), the castle could have existed as early as the beginning of the 12th century, although the first documented reference dates to 1222. (Note: Lullin & Le Fort 1866, p. 160, Act of March 13, 1222)

=== Faucigny fortress ===
The castle appears to have been held by the Châtillon family, possibly the Faucigny-Châtillon branch, a cadet branch of the House of Faucigny, known since the late 12th century. According to Blondel, “as in many other cases, the great comital families entrusted the guardianship of their castles to cadets of their family, who then took the name of the land or of their office.” Two members, Alinard de Châtillon and his son Turumbert, are mentioned as witnesses in a 1178 act, (Note: Lullin & Le Fort 1866, pp. 110–111, Act of June 1178) and a knight named Giraud (or Girard) is recorded as vidame of Châtillon in 1210. (Note: Lullin & Le Fort 1866, p. 141, Act of February 1210)

The castle became a primary residence of the lords of Faucigny, where official acts were issued. Around 1200, Aymon II of Faucigny moved from the ancestral castle of Faucigny to this site. In 1234, he drew up his will and arranged the engagement of his daughter Agnès of Faucigny to Pierre II of Savoy in the castle chapel. Their daughter Béatrice of Faucigny was engaged there in 1241 to Guigues VII, Dauphin of Viennois. Pierre II of Savoy undertook significant construction at the castle in 1260 and strengthened its fortifications in 1263. Some of the castle’s garrison was provided by the Abbey of Aulps for its properties within the Châtillon châtellenie.

The castle became the center of a châtellenie, and later of a mandement encompassing Châtillon and Cluses. In the 14th century, it served as the administrative center of the Faucigny bailliage, replacing Bonneville. From 1357, when the mandement was designated Châtillon and Cluses, the bailli increasingly resided in the town of Cluses.

=== Savoyard fortress ===
The Treaty of Paris of 5 January 1355 returned the castle to Savoyard control. (Note: According to Salch, the castle was acquired in 1335 by the House of Savoy. This seems surprising, as it was in the possession of the Dauphins and should have transferred with the Dauphiné lands following its cession to the King of France (cession of 31 March 1349); there may be an error with the date of 1355. Salch, Charles-Laurent (1987). Dictionnaire des châteaux et des fortifications du Moyen Âge en France [Dictionary of Medieval Castles and Fortifications in France] (in French) (28th ed.). Strasbourg: Éditions Publitotal. p. 314. ISBN 2-86535-070-3. OCLC 1078727877.) It underwent major repairs in 1360 and between 1366 and 1372. The Countesses of Savoy, Bonne of Bourbon and Bonne of Berry, occasionally resided there, with the latter constructing a new tower around 1380. On 13 January 1406, the last heir of Béatrix, Jean de Chalon-Arlay, donated the castle to Duke Amadeus VIII of Savoy, who appointed a châtelain. The castle saw additional works in the 15th century.

In 1492, it was briefly seized by revolting peasants led by Jean Gay of Megève, known as the “Red Robes,” before being recaptured by the Duke of Savoy. By the 16th century, the castle functioned primarily as a prison. In 1530, Duke Charles III of Savoy enfeoffed the castle to the La Palud family.

=== Destruction of the castle ===
According to tradition, the castle was destroyed during the 1589 conflict when the Duchy of Savoy was reportedly threatened by Bernese and Genevan forces, although there is no evidence that these troops reached the site.

From this period, the fortress appears to have ceased to play a significant defensive role in Faucigny. It was gradually abandoned and fell into ruins due to lack of maintenance, and it was likely used as a source of building material by the local population.

In 1699, Victor Amadeus II enfeoffed the castle to Joseph Martin du Fresnoy (Dufrenoy), who thereby assumed the title of marquis. The enfeoffment included various prerogatives over the seigneuries of Cluses and Châtillon, such as the authority to appoint judges and other officials, as well as rights related to fishing, hunting, ovens, tolls, mills, commons, mountains, forests, measurements, and roads. In 1769, following the death of Louis du Fresnoy, the last heir of the family, the estates passed to his nephew Joseph Planchamp, who inherited the marquisate and the ruins of Châtillon.

== Description ==
The castle comprised several enclosures, including the main fortress, noble residences, the curacy, and the castle chapel, which later served as the parish church. Although only remnants remain, their scale provides insight into the castle's appearance in the 14th and 15th centuries. Surviving châtellenie account rolls have also contributed to the understanding of the site.

The castle was organized into three successive enclosures: the lower enclosure, or plain-château, which included the castle chapel; two successive courtyards containing the lordly residence; and the keep. A plan of the castle was proposed by the Swiss archaeologist Louis Blondel and is also reproduced in Histoire des communes savoyardes (1980).

Ruins in 2015

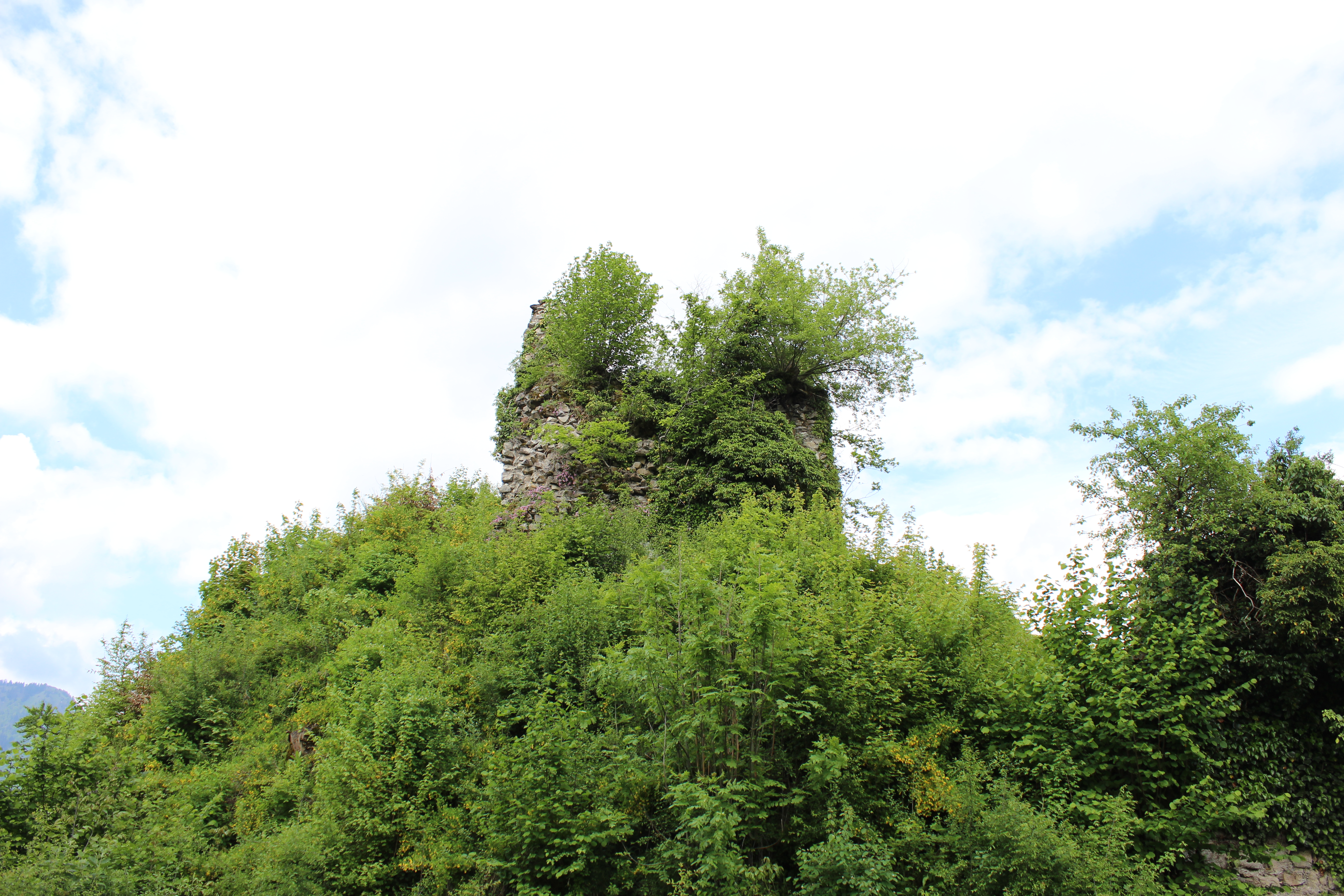

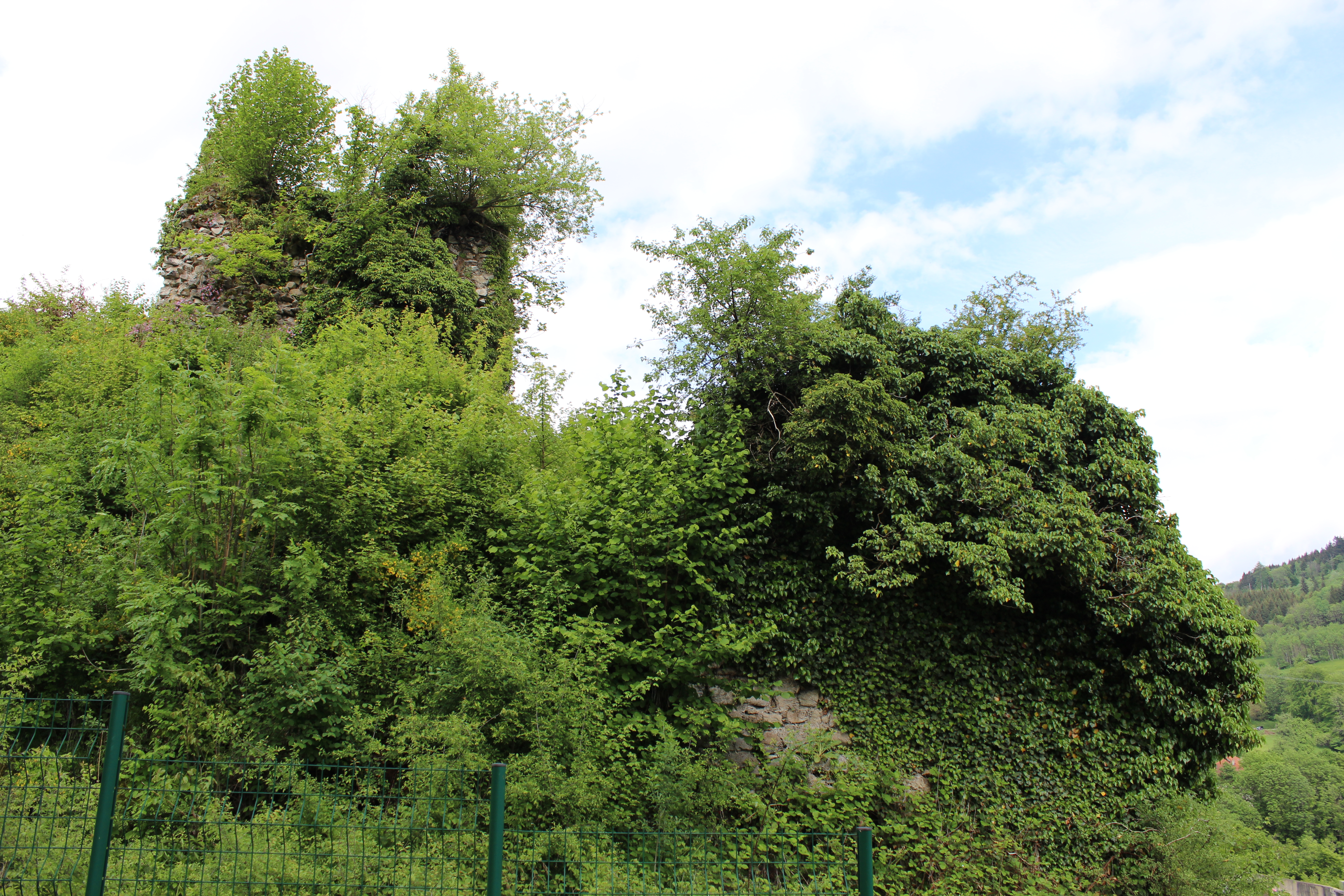

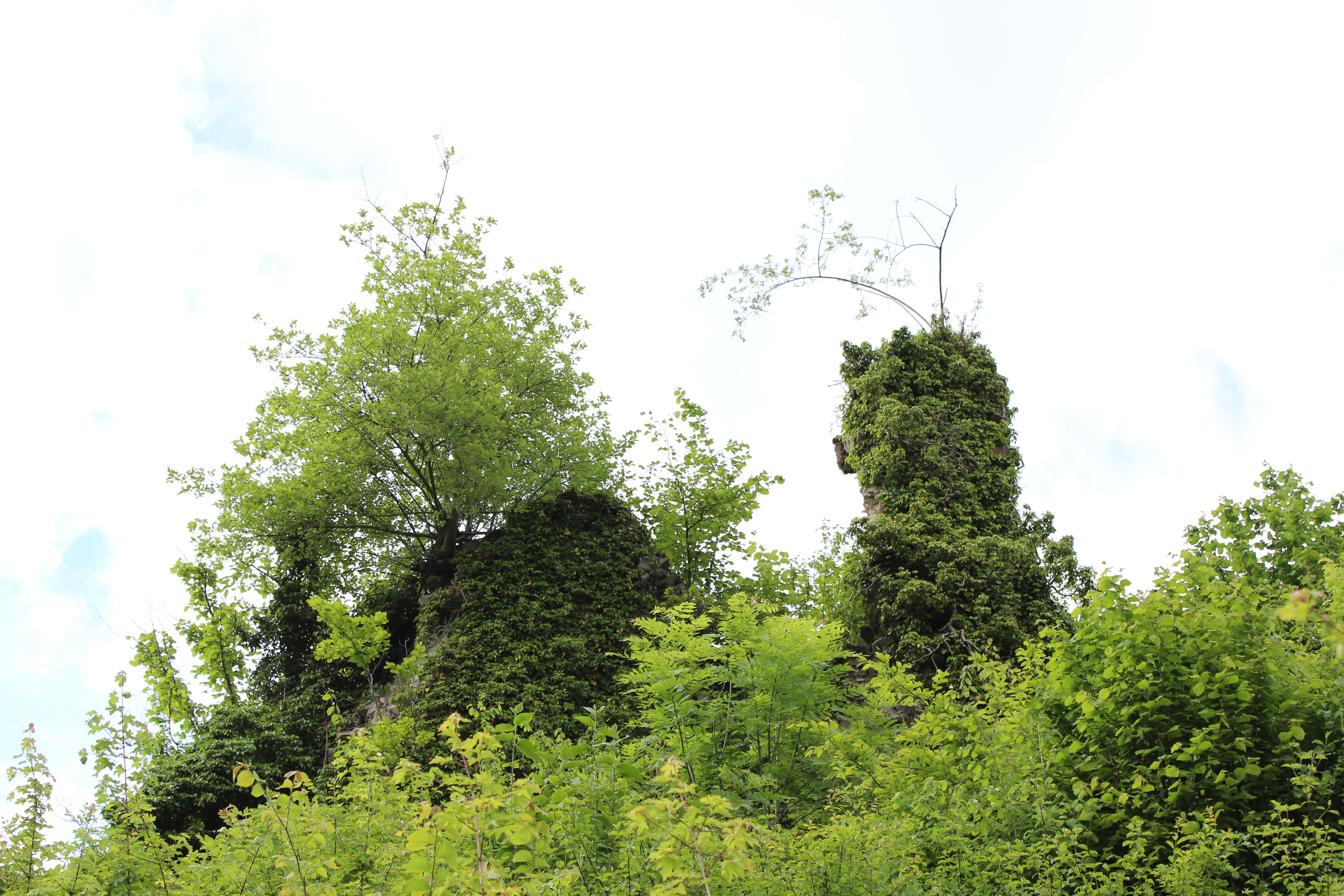

=== The plain-castle and the castle chapel ===
Access to the castle and its first enclosure was via a path on a steep slope. This section included the plain-château and the castle chapel.

The chapel is first mentioned in 1150 in a confirmation act, which indicates that it belonged to the priory of Contamine-sur-Arve (Note: Lullin & Le Fort 1866, pp. 110–111, Act of confirmation from the year 1150) and appears to have been returned to the Bishop of Geneva following a 1198 ruling. (Note: Lullin & Le Fort 1866, pp. 129–130, Sentence of 1198)

A cemetery was located along the eastern part of the outer wall of the first enclosure.

=== The residence and the keep ===
The second and third enclosures contained the lordly residence, situated along the edge of the second courtyard, and the keep.

The second enclosure included a square tower that secured access to the castle. A steep path led to the gate of the final enclosure, which contained the courtyard and the lordly residence. The lord’s apartment was located on the second floor, at the same level as the great hall, both of which were equipped with fireplaces.

At the eastern end, the remains of a Romanesque keep measuring 6.60 × 7.70 meters face the approach direction. The base is still visible, indicating construction during the Romanesque period (12th century). The keep was likely used for surveillance and as a stronghold.

A third tower, built by Bonne of Berry between 1379 and 1380, was probably situated north of the keep.

=== Belvedere of the “Cuar” ===
The Cuar hill was separated from the fortress by a rock-cut ditch, which may have originally supported a fortification.

The hill has since been developed into a terraced garden.

== Châtellenie of châtillon and cluses ==
=== Organization ===
The Château de Châtillon served as the center of a châtellenie (or mandement) from the 13th century, referred to in documents as the châtellenie of Châtillon and, from 1357, as the mandement of Châtillon and Cluses. It was considered one of the most important châtellenies of Faucigny.

At the end of the 12th century, Faucigny was organized around nine châtellenies, (Note: The nine châtellenies in order of precedence were: Châtillon, Bonneville, Bonne, Sallanches, Faucigny, Le Châtelet du Crédoz, Samoëns, Montjoie, and Flumet.) with Châtillon holding first place in precedence according to the 1431 inventory of Faucigny titles.

During the Delphinal period (1342–1343), the region was reorganized into fifteen châtellenies, including Châtillon.

Villages, Parishes, and Fortifications of the Châtellenie of Châtillon (Cluses)
Commune	Name	Type
Arâches-la-Frasse	Le Châtelard	small castle (châtelet)
Châtillon-sur-Cluses	Château de Châtillon	castle
Cluses	Château de Chessy	castle
Les Gets	Château de Cuar	fortified house
Les Gets	Maison forte des Gets	fortified house
Marnaz	Château de Marcossey	castle
Marnaz	Tour de Marnaz	autre
Mieussy	Château de Rovorée	castle
Mieussy	Château de Barbey (château des Barbey)	castle
La Rivière-Enverse	Maison forte de Cellières	fortified house
Saint-Sigismond	Châtelard de Saint-Sigismond	small castle (châtelet)
Scionzier	Château de Mussel	small castle (châtelet)
Taninges	Maison forte des Buchilles	small castle (châtelet)
Taninges	Maison forte de Flérier	small castle (châtelet)
Thyez	Château de la Place	castle
Verchaix	Château de Graverruaz	castle

In the early 14th century, the barony of Faucigny was reorganized into seventeen châtellenies.

The Château de Châtillon also served as the administrative center of the Faucigny bailliage. From 1357, the bailliage was referred to as Châtillon and Cluses, with the bailli residing primarily in Cluses.

In the 17th century, the châtellenie was composed of two groups of parishes: Fleyrier, Ognion, and Mieussy in the first group; and Cluses, Scionzier, Saint-Sigismond, Arâches, Châtillon-sur-Cluses, Thyez, and Marignier in the second.

During this period, the arms of the mandement of Cluses were described as a gold cross on a blue field.

=== Châtelains ===
In the barony of Faucigny, and later in the County of Savoy, the châtelain was an officer appointed for a fixed term and subject to removal. The châtelain managed the châtellenie or mandement, collected fiscal revenues, and oversaw the maintenance of the castle. He was sometimes assisted by an accounts receiver who prepared the annual report submitted by the châtelain or his deputy.

During the Savoyard period, châtelains could also hold the office of bailli of Faucigny.

Châtelains of Châtillon, then Cluses, from the 13th to the 16th century
Dauphinoise, then French Administration:
- before 1309–1340: unknown. A châtelain is mentioned, but without a name, in a 1309 act of the Lady of Faucigny, Beatrice, and Hugues Dauphin;
- circa 1340: Thibault de Châtillon, co-lord.

Savoyard Administration:

- 17 July 1355–22 March 1370 (also receiver): Pierre Dameysin
- 22 March 1370–18 October 1375 (also receiver): Nicod François, former bailiff of Bugey and Novalaise, then bailiff of Faucigny during this period
- 18 October 1375–18 August 1392 (also receiver): Jacques de Mouxy
- 18 August 1392–24 November 1398 (also receiver): Humbert of Savoy
- 24 November 1398–21 September 1403: Jean de Clermont, lord of Saint-Pierre de Soucy
- 25 November 1403–8 June 1408 (also receiver): Viffrey de La Croix, bailiff of Faucigny
- 8 June 1408–9 June 1410: Étienne Bouduy, originally from Bonne
- 12 January 1414–24 June 1419: Hugonin (Hugues?) de Lucinge, bailiff of Faucigny, also châtelain of Rumilly-sous-Cornillon (1411–1417), then of Bonneville (1415?-1419)
- 24 June 1419–24 June 1429 (also receiver): Gaspard de Montmayeur, lord of Villard-Sallet, Montmayeur, Briançon, Oron, and Palézieux, marshal of Savoy, governor and bailiff of Faucigny
- 24 June 1429–21 May 1433: Claude of Saxony, lord of La Ravoire
- 21 May 1433–29 September 1440 (also receiver): Boniface of Saxony, bailiff of Faucigny
- September 1440–1 May 1445: Guillaume de La Forest
- 1 May 1445–24 October 1446: Jacques de Challand
- 24 October 1446–1 September 1447 (also receiver): Humbert de la Ravoire, lord of Aix and Yvoire
- 1 September 1447–6 October 1449: Jacques de Challand, lord of Aymeville
- 6 October 1449–6 October 1450: Guillaume de Genève, bailiff of Faucigny
- 19 October 1450–25 January 1451: Pierre de La Frasse
- 25 January 1451–15 March 1456 (also receiver): Pierre de Bourbon, bailiff of Faucigny
- 18 October 1456–7 September 1458: Philibert Philippe, son of François de la Pallud, count of La Roche
- 7 September 1458–15 March 1461: Guillaume de Genève, lord of Lullin
- 15 April 1461–25 January 1462: François de Langin, lord of Veygier
- 25 January 1462–3 July 1475 (also receiver): Count François I of Gruyère, marshal of Savoy (1465), bailiff of Faucigny
- 25 March 1477–15 October 1479 (also receiver): Bernard de Menthon
- 15 October 1479–25 March 1492 (also receiver): Amé (Amed) de Viry, lord of Rolle
- 25 March 1493–25 March 1496: Jacques de Mandallaz
- 25 March 1496–25 March 1502 (also receiver): Baron Amé (Amed) de Viry
- 11 July 1502–25 March 1503: Louis Bonivard, bailiff of Faucigny
- 25 March 1503–1530 (also receiver): Claude de Balleyson (Ballaison), bailiff of Faucigny

Administration of the Appanage of Genevois (1502–1659):

- 1530: Noble Claude-Jacques de Bardonenche
- 1530–1531: Noble Antoine de Bellegarde
- 1532: Noble Aymon Puthod
- 1534–29 September 1541–29 September 1542: Noble Claude-Jacques de Bardonenche, lord of Folliet
- 1543–1544: Noble Claude-Jacques de Bardonenche
- 1545–1555: Noble Charles François de La Frasse
- 1555–1559: Noble Aymé Du Fresney
- 1559–1565: Noble Louis de Chignin
- 1565–1568: Nobles Jean de Loche and Louis de Chignin
  - 1565: Noble Charles-François de La Frasse, châtelain for judicial matters
- 1569–1571: Master (Note: “Master” is a title associated with prosecutors, notaries, practitioners, and commissioners.) or noble Pierre Rochette
- 1571–1577: Masters Pierre de La Grange and Humbert Montans, co-fermiers
- 1577–1580: Masters Nicolas Dufour and Humbert Montans, co-fermiers
- 1580–1586: Master or noble Jean-Jacques Guydebois
- 1586–1592: Master Nicolas Dufour
- 1592–1604: Master Jacques Dufour
- 1604–1606: Master Nicolas Dufour
- 1606–1609: Master Antoine Grandat
- 1610–1622: Master François Devaud
- 1622–1628: Master François Hugard
- 1628–1634: Masters François Hugard and Jean Planchampt
- 1634–1646: Master Louis Bouvet

The revenues of the Cluses mandement are now divided into two:

- 1646–1652: Masters Jacques Jacquet, François Devaud, Pierre Perrier, and Hugonin Perron
- 1652–1658: Master Jacques Jacquet
- 1658–1659: Master Pierre Perrier
- 1646–1652: Honorable Jacques Jacquet
- 1652–1654: Master Jean-Aymé Avet
- 1654–1658: Master François Devaud
- 1658–1659: Honorable (Note: “Honorable” is a title associated with successful artisans.) Jacques and Master Claude Jacquet, his son

== See also ==
- House of Faucigny
- Medieval fortification
- Castle
- Fortification

== Bibliography ==
- Baud, Henri; Mariotte, Jean-Yves; Guerrier, Alain (1980). Histoire des communes savoyardes : Le Faucigny [History of Savoyard municipalities: Le Faucigny] (in French). Roanne: Éditions Horvath. pp. 256–262. ISBN 2-7171-0159-4.
- Blondel, Louis (1978). Châteaux de l'ancien diocèse de Genève [Castles of the former diocese of Geneva] (in French). Vol. 7. Société d'histoire et d'archéologie de Genève.
- Carrier, Nicolas; de La Corbière, Matthieu (2005). Histoire des communes savoyardes : Le FaucignyEntre Genève et Mont-Blanc au XIVe siècle : enquête et contre-enquête dans le Faucigny delphinal de 1339 [Between Geneva and Mont Blanc in the 14th century: investigation and counter-investigation in the Dauphin's Faucigny in 1339] (in French). Librairie Droz. ISBN 978-2-88442-019-8.
- Chapier, Georges (2005). Châteaux Savoyards : Faucigny, Chablais, Tarentaise, Maurienne, Savoie propre, Genevois [Savoyard castles: Faucigny, Chablais, Tarentaise, Maurienne, Savoie propre, Genevois]. L'amateur Averti (in French). La Découvrance. pp. 20–21. ISBN 978-2-84265-326-2.
- Germain, Michel; Hebrard, Jean-Louis; Jond, Gilbert (1996). Dictionnaire des communes de Haute-Savoie [Dictionary of municipalities in Haute-Savoie] (in French). Horvath. ISBN 978-2-7171-0933-7.
- Guy, Lucien (1929). "Les anciens châteaux du Faucigny - Château de Châtillon-sur-Cluses (section)" [The ancient castles of Faucigny - Château de Châtillon-sur-Cluses (section)]. Mémoires & documents (in French). 47: 198–200.
- Lullin, Lullin; Le Fort, Charles (1866). Régeste genevois : Répertoire chronologique et analytique des documents imprimés relatifs à l'histoire de la ville et du diocèse de Genève avant l'année 1312 [Régeste genevois: Chronological and analytical directory of printed documents relating to the history of the city and diocese of Geneva prior to 1312] (in French). Société d'histoire et d'archéologie de Genève.
- Regat, Christian; Aubert, François (1999). Châteaux de Haute-Savoie : Chablais, Faucigny, Genevois [Castles of Haute-Savoie: Chablais, Faucigny, Genevois] (in French). Cabédita. p. 44. ISBN 978-2-88295-117-5.
