= Mélan Charterhouse =

Carthusian nunnery in France

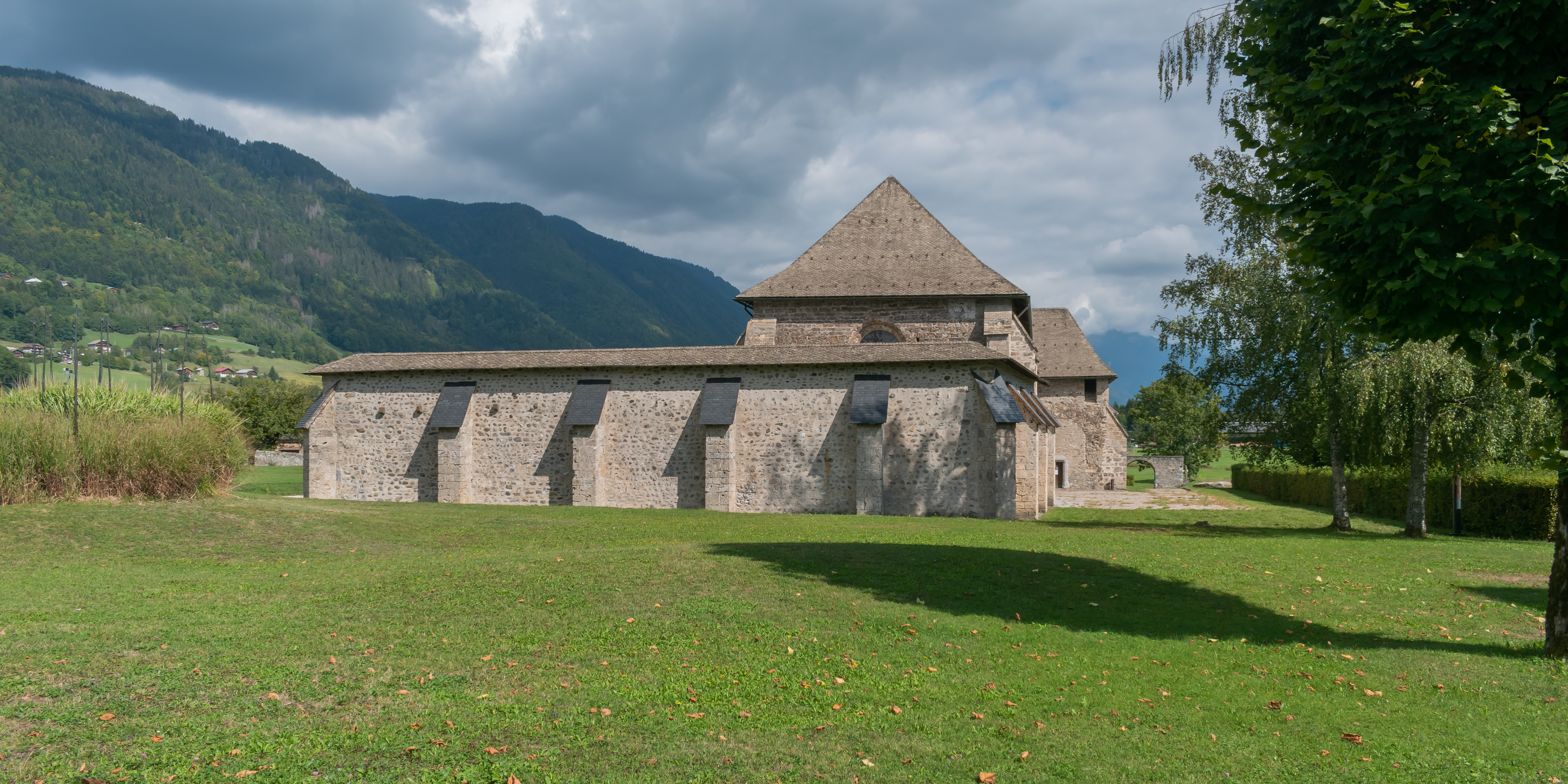
- Mélan Charterhouse
- Interactive map of Mélan Charterhouse
- Location: Taninges, Haute-Savoie
- Coordinates: 46°06′08″N 6°35′47″E
- Type: Charterhouse
- Completion date: 1285
- Heritage: Listed as a MH (1911); Listed as a MH (1932); Listed as a MH (1983, partial)

Mélan Charterhouse (French: Chartreuse de Mélan) is a former Carthusian monastery, or charterhouse, located in the commune of Taninges, in the Haute-Savoie department of the Auvergne-Rhône-Alpes region of France.

Originally established as a charterhouse for Carthusian nuns, it was later repurposed as a minor seminary and subsequently as a departmental orphanage. It currently functions as a departmental cultural center.

The site has been listed as a historical monument since 1911.

== Geography ==
=== Location ===
Mélan Charterhouse is located in the southern part of the commune of Taninges, in the Haute-Savoie department of the Auvergne-Rhône-Alpes region. It is situated on the alluvial plain of the Giffre River. At the time of its foundation, the land belonged to the lords of Faucigny, who held the eponymous fief.

=== Access ===
==== By highway ====
The former Mélan Charterhouse is located near the commune of Taninges and is accessible via the A40 motorway (exit at Cluses), followed by the RD902 toward Châtillon-sur-Cluses and Taninges. The site is reached by the Route de Mélan, situated at the southern entrance of the commune.

| A40 | Direction Mâcon - Passy | Direction Passy - Mâcon |
|---|---|---|
| Road 18 | Morzine-Avoriaz, Les Gets, Samoëns, and Cluses - La Sardagne | Cluses - La Sardagne, and Scionzier |
| Road 19 | Flaine, Les Carroz d'Arâches, Cluses - Centre | |

== Toponymy ==
The foundation of Mélan Charterhouse occurred on a site historically referred to as a mediolanum, a term of Celtic origin derived from medios (meaning "middle") and lanon (meaning "plain"). This etymology is reflected in the evolution of the place name, which appears as Mellane in 1229 and Melanum in 1292.

The location is referenced in the 1262 will of Agnes of Faucigny, which was drafted "inside the chapel of Mélans in the parish of Floirie" (present-day hamlet of Fleyrier).

== History ==
=== Foundation ===
The site selected by Béatrice of Faucigny for the establishment of a monastic institution had previously been occupied by a residence and chapel constructed by her parents, Agnes of Faucigny and Peter II, Count of Savoy. Archaeological evidence suggests the presence of an earlier Gallo-Roman villa, with discoveries including Roman tile fragments and the remains of a necropolis.

The documented history of Mélan begins with the founding of a Carthusian nunnery in 1282 by Beatrice of Faucigny, known as the Grande Dauphine. The church was intended to serve as the burial place for her son, John I, heir to the Dauphiné, who died at the age of twenty in a riding accident. At the time, the House of Faucigny did not yet possess a Carthusian nunnery. The establishment was therefore conceived both as a dynastic mausoleum and a religious foundation, also intended to serve as Beatrice's final resting place.

The founding charter of Mélan Charterhouse was executed on 3 June 1285. The first nuns arrived in June 1288, although the buildings were not yet completed at that time. A second act confirming the foundation was issued in 1288 and ratified by Guillaume de Conflans, bishop of Geneva, on 12 April 1292. The church was consecrated on 28 December 1290, making the site ready to receive the remains of the Dauphin, which had previously been interred at Sixt Abbey.

The 1292 charter specified that Mélan Charterhouse was intended to accommodate forty nuns and seven fathers. This number was increased to fifty-nine in the following year. However, the monastery's limited capacity meant that the actual number of residents rarely exceeded forty. The same charter granted the community ownership of all existing and future buildings, a large meadow, gardens, a barn within the enclosure, as well as ponds, fishponds, and a mill located either inside or outside the monastery's boundaries.

The foundation and its endowments were officially confirmed by Emperor Rudolph I of the Holy Roman Empire through letters patent issued on 24 September 1292.

=== Middle Ages ===
Despite the substantial endowments provided by the Grande Dauphine, the charterhouse did not experience significant expansion. In 1732, the monastery's land holdings were estimated at 583 hectares; however, the community was frequently described as impoverished. The number of nuns never exceeded forty, further indicating its limited resources.

In 1430, Duke Amadeus VIII of Savoy allocated ten florins for the establishment of a chapel.

=== Modern era ===
In 1528, a fire partially destroyed the charterhouse. The cloister was subsequently rebuilt in the Flamboyant Gothic style, characterized by a rectangular layout.

Renovation of the monastery did not occur until the intervention of Dom Innocent Le Masson, the 51st general of the Carthusian Order, who served from 1627 to 1703.

=== French Revolution ===
In France, a decree issued on 2 November 1789 initiated the nationalization of Church property. On 18 November, the state ordered an inventory of all movable and immovable assets belonging to churches and monastic institutions. Between 13 and 19 February 1790, the National Constituent Assembly abolished monastic vows and suppressed religious orders and congregations, except those engaged in public education and charity.

These reforms did not initially apply to Savoy, which remained independent at the time. However, during the night of 21 to 22 September 1792, without a formal declaration of war, the French Army of the Alps, under the command of Anne Pierre de Montesquiou-Fézensac and comprising approximately 15,000 soldiers, including the Legion of the Allobroges, entered Savoy through Les Marches and Apremont. The garrison of Chambéry withdrew, retreating through the Bauges mountains toward the Tarentaise and then into Piedmont via the Aosta Valley.

In October 1792, the National Assembly of the Allobroges convened in Chambéry Cathedral. During its sessions on 26 and 27 October, it abolished the sovereign rights of the House of Savoy, the privileges of the nobility, feudal dues (without compensation) and the tithe, and ordered the confiscation of ecclesiastical property.

On October 31, 1792, a departmental commission tasked with conducting property inventories delegated citizens Thévenet and Ducret to assess the movable and immovable assets of Mélan Charterhouse.

Following the decree of the National Convention on 28 November 1792, Savoy was officially annexed by France and became the 84th department under the name Mont-Blanc department. With this annexation, Savoy was fully integrated into the French revolutionary framework.

In 1793, the forty nuns and seven priests of Mélan Charterhouse were expelled, and the monastery was sold as national property.

On 27 August 1793, the General Council of the Mont-Blanc department ordered the expulsion of the nuns. They were transferred to a detention center in Chambéry and required to take the civic oath mandated by the Civil Constitution of the Clergy, under penalty of exile from Savoy. During the winter of 1793–1794, the charterhouse was vandalized and looted.

=== Contemporary period ===
==== College ====
In 1803, Abbé Marin Ducrey (1766–1834) established a secondary school at the former charterhouse by relocating a college he had previously founded in the nearby town of Sallanches. The institution provided a classical and religious education for boarding students.

The school became a minor seminary in 1809. In 1833, Jesuits joined the institution to support its educational mission and remained until 1848. They were succeeded by priests from the Diocese of Annecy until 1857, followed by the Missionaries of Saint Francis de Sales, a congregation founded in 1838 by Pierre Mermier. The congregation administered the seminary until 1903.

The enactment of the 1905 Law on the Separation of Churches and the State led to the closure of the college.

==== Departmental Childcare Center ====
In 1906, the site was acquired by the General Council of Haute-Savoie, which established a departmental children's home. In 1923, the facility was converted into a departmental orphanage.

On 6 March 1967, a fire resulted in the deaths of eighteen residents and destroyed much of the complex, including several medieval structures. Only the church, cloister, and some peripheral buildings were preserved. The institution was subsequently closed.

==== Departmental Cultural Center ====
Nowadays, the charterhouse has become a "departmental contemporary art center".

== Description ==
=== Architecture ===
The former Mélan Charterhouse, located in the glacial plain of Taninges, was constructed in the 13th and 16th centuries. It is a representative example of Gothic architecture, or "ogival style", in the Haute-Savoie region. The church features restored parquet flooring and contemporary stained-glass windows installed in 2002.

Of the original monastic complex, only the church remains, accompanied by two original side chapels adorned with 15th-century wall paintings, and a 16th-century Gothic cloister typical of Alpine architecture.

The cloister, rebuilt in the 14th century, was classified as a historic monument on 27 November 1911. The chapel received the same designation on 20 February 1932. The façades and roofs of the farm, stables, and guesthouse were listed as historic monuments on 21 September 1983.

=== Church ===
==== Interior of the church ====
The church, built in 1290, is one of the few remaining structures of the former monastery. It has a simple, rectangular plan and features a single nave without columns. The nave measures 9.95 meters in width and 31.40 meters in length, divided into five bays.

The chevet is flat and illuminated by a triplet of lancet windows with double splays, with the central window larger than the flanking ones. (Note: The quote from Mariotte and Baud (p. 585) refers to a curved shape, whereas Aniel refers to a broken arc (p. 122).) The west façade includes an oculus featuring a quatrefoil decorative motif.

Two square side chapels were added in the 14th century. Access to these chapels is through doorways with straight lintels.

The bays of the church are covered by ribbed vaults, separated by transverse arches, all constructed from rubble stone tuff. Each bay is illuminated by a tall narrow window — three on the north side, set higher in the wall, and four on the south side — designed in the same style as those in the chevet.

The five bays were historically divided by a grille that separated the space used by the nuns and lay sisters from the area reserved for the priests, located in the last two bays. Fifteenth-century wall paintings have been identified on the vaults, including floral motifs separated by Gothic letters "E.P.S." The vault surfaces also display red and black stars, with traces suggesting they may have originally been gilded.

The bay walls are supported by rectangular buttresses. Access to the church was provided through four doors on the west side of the building, in addition to two facing doors located in the fourth bay.

==== Chapels ====
The church includes two chapels: the northern chapel, built in 1345 by Humbert de Cholay, bailiff of Faucigny, and the southern chapel, constructed in 1374 by Amadeus VI, Count of Savoy.

The northern chapel, dedicated to Our Lady, features a keystone carved with the Lamb of God. The southern chapel was placed under the patronage of Saint Joseph.

Both chapels replicate the architectural elements of the church's nave.

==== Exterior architectural elements ====
The entrance portal on the west façade was reconstructed in the Flamboyant Gothic style following the fire in the 16th century. The current portal features decorative elements framing the door, consisting of three arches. The third arch divides to form a pointed-arch tympanum, which was originally intended to accommodate three statues: one in the central niche and two on lateral consoles.

This entrance, used by the nuns, provided access to the cloister. The church at Mélan is considered a larger replica of the former parish church of Fleyrier, constructed shortly thereafter.

=== Cloister ===
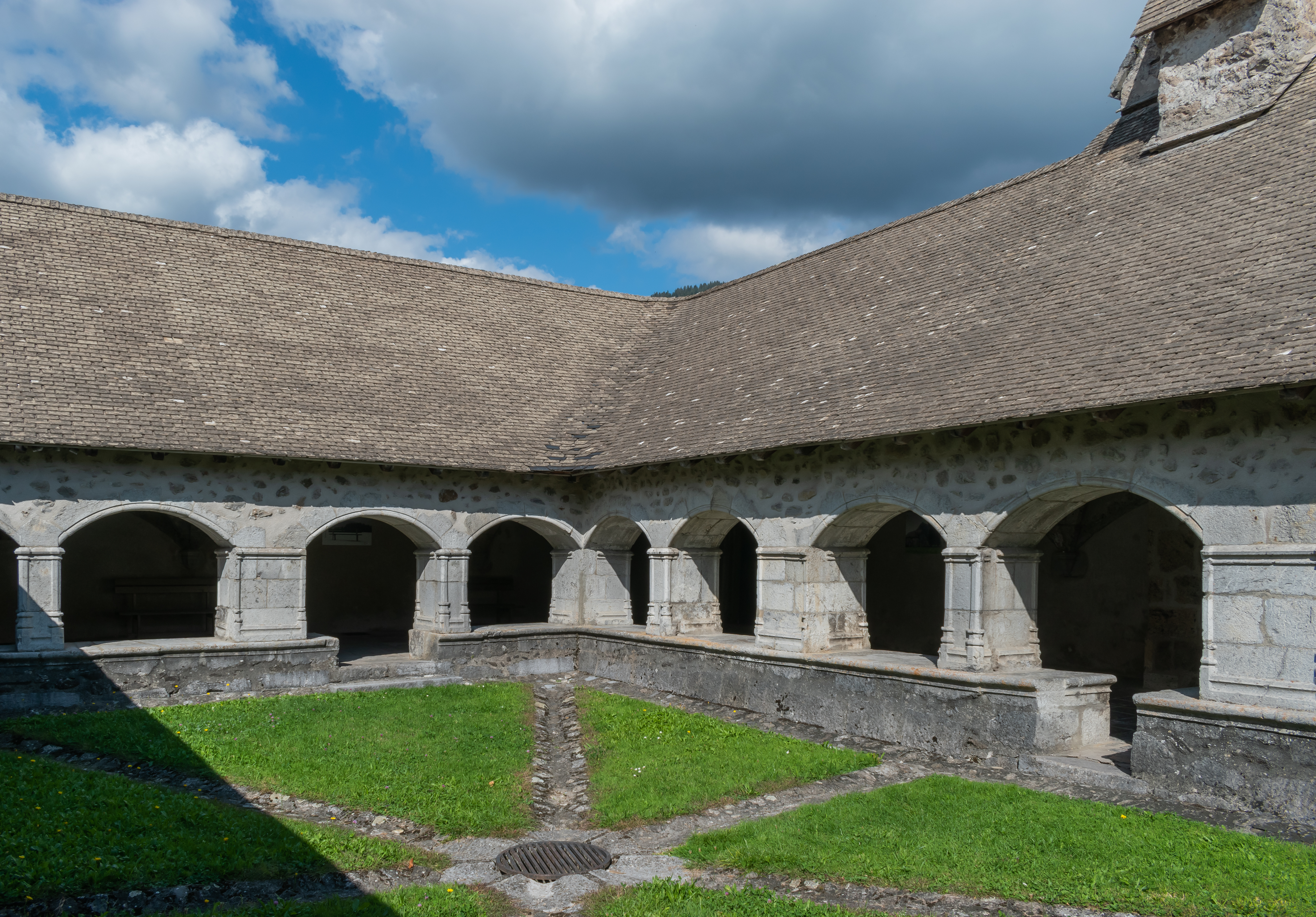
The cloister

The cloister, rectangular in plan, was rebuilt in the late Gothic style following the fire of 1528. Constructed from white limestone, it features simple arcades with lowered arches and molded edges. The arcades are supported laterally by large square piers and centrally by smaller grouped supports. The structure is unornamented apart from the molding along the arches.

=== Other elements of the charterhouse ===
==== Living quarters ====
Unlike other charterhouses where individual houses were built around the cloister, the small number of residents at Mélan Charterhouse led to a different arrangement. The nuns were accommodated in a single building that contained individual cells.

==== Refectory ====
The main refectory measures 15 meters in length and 7 meters in width. Located further to the north is a second, smaller refectory, which was reserved for the lay sisters.

=== Monastery or House of the Fathers ===
The monks' quarters are arranged in a U-shaped layout, open to the north and oriented toward the church.

=== Park ===
Twelve contemporary sculptures are displayed in the park of Mélan Charterhouse. The park forms part of the Art and Nature trail, which extends along the Giffre River to the commune of Taninges.

=== Forest ===
Adjacent to the charterhouse is a forest owned by the departmental authorities. The watercourse running through the forest is designated as a Sensitive Natural Area. The forest is primarily composed of ash, white alder, and spruce trees, and is inhabited by various wildlife species, including deer and wild boar.

== Figures connected to the charterhouse ==
=== List of prioresses ===
The following is a non-exhaustive list of the prioresses of Mélan Charterhouse from its foundation until its closure during the French Revolution.

List of prioresses of the Carthusian monastery of Mélan from 1288 to 1794
| Marguerite de Gex (1288 - 1294); Alaysia de Chateauneuf (1295 - 1298); Marguerite de Gex (1298 - 1318); Marguerite de Falconio (1319 - 1322); Jeanne de Riddes (1322); Catherine de Luccinge (1322 - 1347); Jeanne de Cohendiers (1348 - 1358); Claudine Dufrenay (1360 - ?); Hélène Dufrenay (1363 - ?); Hélène de Chissé (1371 - ?); Éléonore ... (1395); Isabelle de Dingier (1395 - 1408); Isabelle de Menthon (1409 - 1410); Périne de la Croix (1410 - ?); Alexia de Menthon (1422); Marguerite de La Frasse (1422 - 1441); Claudia Chissé (1441); Béatrix de Bonne (1441 - 1454); Jeannette de Cohendiers (1454 - 1465); Françoise d'Estanche (1465 - 1477); Ayma Martin (1477 - 1480); Joannine de la Croix (1480 - 1500); Michelette de Chissé (1500 - 1507); Pantaléone de Cornillon (1507 - 1510) | Amédée d'Amancy (1510 - 1534); Jeanne de Hardonenche (1534 - 1539); Sébastienne d'Amancy (1539 - ?); Claudia de Thoire (1542 - 1544); Jeanne de Cornillon (1544 - 1552); Huguette de Neuvecelle (1552 - 1555); Hugonie de Thoire (1555 - 1563); Catherine de Bons (1564 - ?); Georgie de Boëge (1571); Georgie de La Frasse (1571 - 1572); Georgie de la Fléchère (1572 - 1575); Jeanne-Louise de Boëge (1575 - 1586); Michelette d'Angeville (1586 - 1596); Philiberte Martin (1596 - 1605); Jeanne d'Angeville (1605 - 1618); Amédée de Crans (1618 - 1646); Pernette du Foug (1646 - 1660); Gasparde Saultier de la Balme (1660 - 1673); Claudine de Boin (1673 - 1685); Élisabeth-Eugènie Turpin (1685 - 1690); Péronne Duboin (1690 - 1732); Marie-Louise Giraud (1732 - 1733); Marguerite-Thérèse Morand (1733 - 1764); Marie-Thérèse de Menthon (1765 - 1781); Anne-Josèphe Duchesne (1781 - 1794) |

== Around the charterhouse ==
=== Heraldry and motto ===
In the 1292 charter, the Grande Dauphine granted her coat of arms to the charterhouse: "Per pale, on the right gold with a blue dolphin with red fins, on the left the ancient arms of Savoy."

The arms of the charterhouse are blazoned as follows:

Per pale: dexter, or, a dolphin azure, crested, bearded, finned, scaled and eared gules, representing the Dauphiné of Viennois; sinister, or, an eagle displayed sable, representing ancient Savoy.

Following the Carthusian tradition, Mélan Charterhouse bears arms combining those of the Dauphins of Viennois and those of Beatrice of Faucigny, the founder of Mélan.

The charterhouse seal differs from its coat of arms. It is described as: “Oval in shape, it shows Mary standing on the crescent moon, holding a scepter in her right arm and Jesus in her left.” The motto of the charterhouse is Sigillum Cartusiæ Melani.

=== Charterhouse and its secrets ===
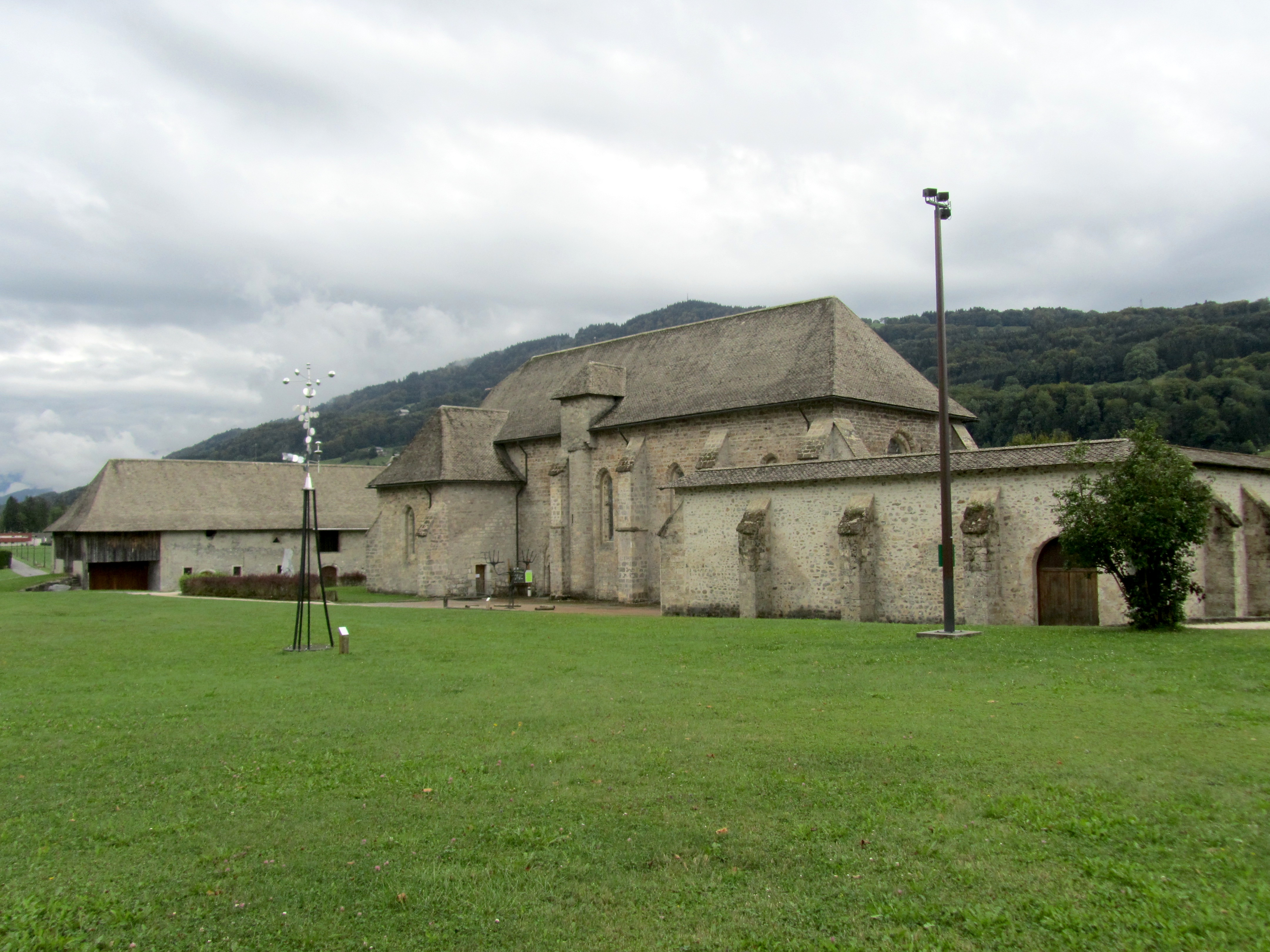
Melan Charterhouse

Mathilde Duriez, a doctoral candidate in archaeology and archaeometry at Lyon 2 University, observes that significant architectural and archival data related to Mélan Charterhouse remain under-utilized. The site has long been absent from the historiography of the Carthusian nuns (Moniales Cartusiennes). Its relative obscurity is partly attributed to its discreet location, set apart from the town, and to its architectural form, which does not conform to conventional expectations of monastic structures.

=== Practical information ===
Mélan Charterhouse is accessible to the public during temporary exhibitions held each summer. Guided heritage tours are offered by the Heritage Guides of the Pays de Savoie in collaboration with the Taninges Tourist Office.

== See also ==
- Carthusians
- List of Carthusian monasteries
- Charterhouse (monastery)
- History of Savoy in the Middle Ages

== Bibliography ==
- Oursel, Raymond; Lemaître, Pascal (2008). Les chemins du sacré : Pèlerinage architectural [The paths of the sacred: Architectural pilgrimage]. Les Savoisiennes (in French). Vol. 2. La Fontaine de Siloé. p. 135. ISBN 978-2-84206-350-4.
- Guichonnet, Paul (2007). Nouvelle encyclopédie de la Haute-Savoie : Hier et aujourd'hui [New encyclopedia of Haute-Savoie: Yesterday and today] (in French). Montmélian: La Fontaine de Siloé. p. 212. ISBN 978-2-84206-374-0.
- Aniel, Jean-Pierre (1983). Les maisons de chartreux : des origines à la chartreuse de Pavie [The houses of the Carthusians: from their origins to the Certosa di Pavia]. Bibliothèque de la Société française d'archéologie (in French). Vol. 18. Société française d'archéologie. pp. 122–123. ISBN 978-2-600-04617-6.
- Baud, Henri; Mariotte, Jean-Yves; Guerrier, Alain (1980). Histoire des communes savoyardes : Le Faucigny [History of the Savoyard communes: Le Faucigny] (in French). Roanne: Éditions Horvath. pp. 581–590. ISBN 2-7171-0159-4.
- Feige, Hilaire (1898). "Histoire de Mélan. Monastère de moniales chartreuses" [The story of Mélan. Monastery of Carthusian nuns]. Mémoires et documents (in French). 20: 518.
- Marullaz, Hilaire (1922). "Histoire de Mélan. 2e partie. Rd Marin Ducrey et le Collège de Mélan (1804-1834)" [The History of Mélan. Part 2. Rd Marin Ducrey and the College of Mélan (1804-1834)]. Mémoires et documents (in French). 42: 191.
- Brocard, Michèle; Brocard, Edmond. "Le gothique en Savoie et Haute-Savoie" [Gothic architecture in Savoie and Haute-Savoie] (in French). Archived from the original on 4 January 2014.
- Duriez, Mathilde. Clôture monastique et organisation spatiale des maisons de moniales cartusiennes (XIIe – XVIIIe siècle) : études archéologiques de plusieurs chartreuses féminines [Monastic enclosure and spatial organization of Cartusian nuns' houses (12th–18th centuries): archaeological studies of several female Carthusian monasteries] (Thesis) (in French). Vol. Lyon. École doctorale Sciences sociales. Archived from the original on 4 March 2020.
