= La Fléchère family =

Noble family

La Fléchère
- Family coat of arms.
- Place of origin: Duchy of Savoy; France; Switzerland
- Connected members: Duchy of Savoy; Kingdom of Sardinia (1720–1861); Kingdom of France
- Distinctions: Page of Duke Victor Amadeus II of Savoy, member of the Sardinian Parliament, governor of the city and province of Sassari, commander of the province of Savoy, major general of Savoy, governors, castellans, squires.

The La Fléchère family is a noble lineage from Savoy, established in the County of Savoy. Its senior branch, known as La Fléchère de Beauregard, remains extant.

== History ==
=== Origins ===
The family owned the Château de Beauregard from 1236 until 2004, although Amédée de Foras notes that the documented lineage begins only in 1370. Members of the family held various notable positions during the nineteenth century.

This house has provided no individual who held the highest offices of the State, but it presents an uninterrupted series of distinguished men in the army and in the Church… This consistent distinction, combined with its great antiquity, the possession of numerous seigneuries, and its illustrious alliances with the families of Vuagnard, Menthon, Lucinge, Saint-Jeoire, Lornay, Châtillon, Rovorée, Chevron-Villette, La Forest, Blonay, Mareschal-Duyn, Arenthon, Gerbais, Seyssel, Genève-Boringe, etc., justifies the place that the late Marquis Costa de Beauregard assigned to the La Fléchère among the historical families of the Duchy of Savoy.

— Amédée de Foras, Armorial et nobiliaire de l'ancien duché de Savoie

According to Amédée de Foras, author of the Arms of Savoy, the La Fléchère family originated in Scotland and may represent a branch of the Flescher family. Another tradition, also reported by Jean-Louis Grillet, attributes to them an Irish origin. Some historians state that an ancestor of the family accompanied Peter II of Savoy on his return from England to his county, although the Flescher family itself appears only in the thirteenth century, coinciding with the earliest references to the Savoyard branch. The Swiss historian Louis Vulliemin, in Chillon: étude historique, presents an additional hypothesis, suggesting that members of Savoyard families who accompanied the count to England later settled there and formed new lineages.

Beyond these proposed origins, the earliest attested member of the family in the Régeste genevois appears in a deed between Aymon II of Faucigny (c. 1180–after October 1253) and the Priory of Chamonix, in which Pierre de La Fléchère is recorded as a witness in 1236.

=== Emergence in Savoy ===
The family, established at Saint-Jeoire-en-Faucigny, built the Château de Beauregard, a fortified site controlling access to the Risse Valley on the slopes of the Herbette mountain.

Its local prominence is indicated by the presence of family tombs in the Church of Saint-Georges.

In 1366, Hugues de La Fléchère (c. 1320–1370), together with the neighboring lord Pierre de Saint-Jeoire, accompanied Count Amadeus VI of Savoy during the Crusade of the East undertaken to support John V Palaiologos. He is reported to have married Elisabeth de Lucinge around 1340.

In 1654, the marriage of his descendant François-Marie with the niece of the Prince-Bishop of Geneva, Jean d’Arenthon d’Alex, further consolidated the family’s integration into the upper ranks of the Savoyard nobility.

=== Surviving La Fléchère de Beauregard branch ===
The senior branch of the family, known as La Fléchère de Beauregard, remains extant. It is listed among the surviving families of the French nobility and was registered with the Association d’entraide de la noblesse française (ANF) in 1990.

== Notable figures ==
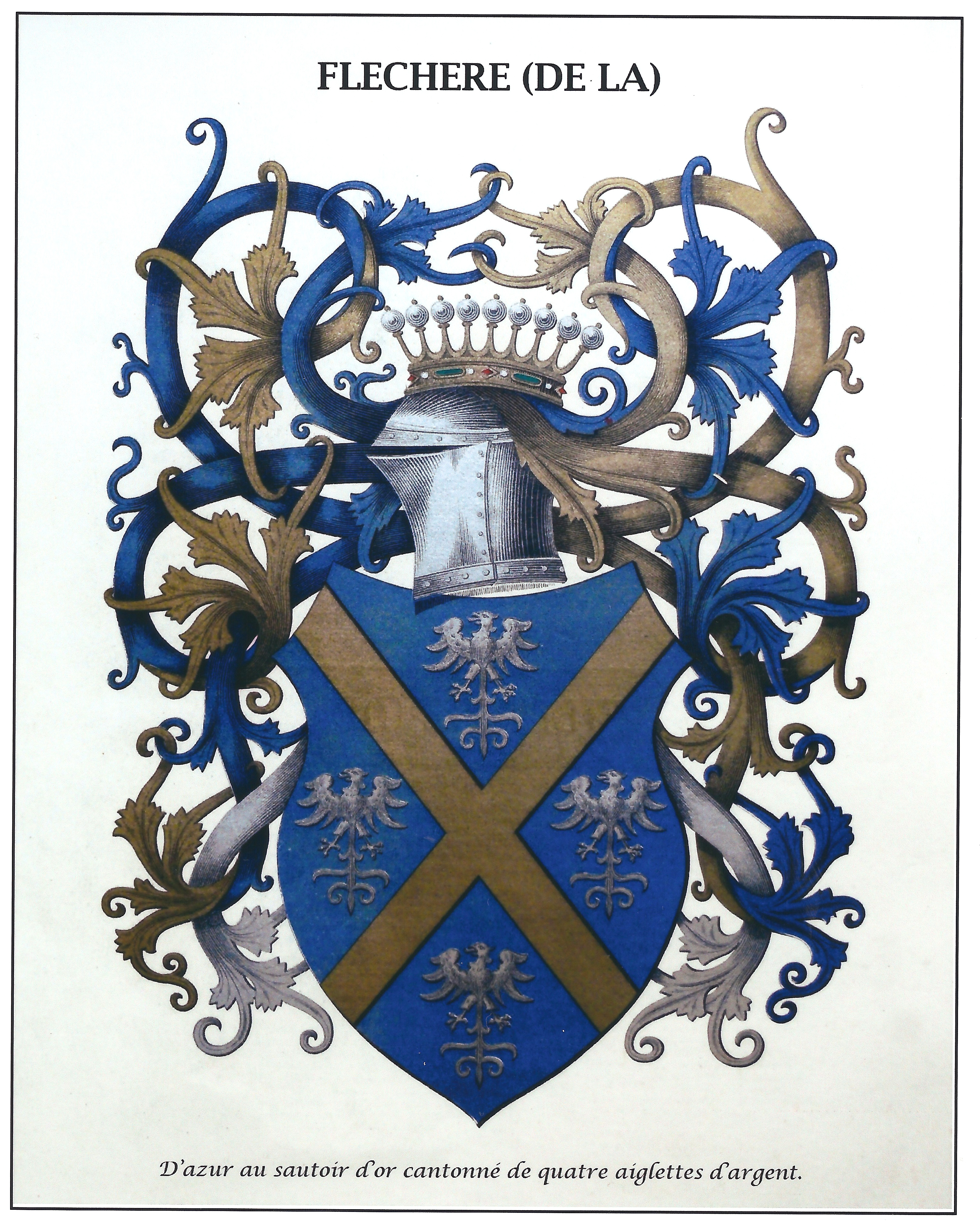
Coat of arms of De la Fléchère

- Claude-François de La Fléchère (d. 1630), first commander of the Orders of Saints Maurice and Lazarus. Married Madeleine de La Forest (c. 1580 – 1632), daughter of Philibert de La Forest Divonne, Baron of La Bâtie d'Albanais.
- Roger de La Fléchère (1915–2011), founder of the Centre Educatif Catholique d’Apprentissage du Métier (CECAM).

=== Political figures ===
- Charles de La Fléchère, Councillor of State and chevalier d'honneur in the Senate of Savoy by letters patent of 2 August 1635.
- Pierre-Claude de La Fléchère (1722–1790), promoter of the development of the town of Carouge.
- François-Marie de La Fléchère (1727–1793), colonel in the Sardinian army, first syndic of Annecy, and Count of Alex.
- André Urbain de La Fléchère (1754–1832), member of the Helvetic Senate from 1798, Councillor of State of Vaud.
- Étienne de La Fléchère de Beauregard (1822–1887), syndic then mayor of Saint-Jeoire until 1887, conseiller général in 1874; he was deputy of Savoy in the Parliament of Turin for the Taninges constituency (1857–1860), replacing Germain Sommeiller.

=== Military figures ===
- Henri de La Fléchère served as artillery commissioner deçà des Monts under letters patent issued on 15 February 1595 and was a knight of the Order of Saints Maurice and Lazarus.
- François-Marie de La Fléchère (born 1727) held the rank of colonel and commanded the Chablais Regiment.
- Jean-Pierre de La Fléchère (1727–1804) was an officer who served as commander-in-chief and governor of Cagliari, where he oversaw the city’s defense against the French fleet in 1793. He later served as vice-roy of Sardinia and subsequently presided over the Piedmontese Military Congress (1799) and the Supreme Council of the Administration of Piedmont (1800).
- Pierre Jean Isidore de La Fléchère (1769–1830) served as colonel commanding the Piedmont Brigade and was a knight of the Order of Saints Maurice and Lazarus.
- Georges-François de La Fléchère (1775–1843) was a colonel of chasseurs in the army of the States of Savoy. He served as governor of the city and province of Sassari in 1825 and later as commander of the province of Savoy in 1829. He was promoted to general in 1830 and was awarded the Grand Cross of the Order of Saints Maurice and Lazarus.

=== Ecclesiastical figures ===
- François de La Fléchère (c. 1540–1602) was a monk of Contamine-sur-Arve and later prior of Sillingy and Contamine. He also served as an advocate at the Senate of Savoy and as prior of Sion. He was the godfather of Saint Francis de Sales.
- Georgie de La Fléchère served as prioress of the Mélan Charterhouse from 1572 to 1575.
- Madeleine de La Forest, Lady of La Fléchère (c. 1580–1632), entered religious life following the death of her husband and founded the Visitation monastery of Rumilly.
- Sister Françoise-Innocente de La Fléchère (1608–1655), daughter of Madeleine de La Forest, served as superior of the Visitation of Annecy and later of the Visitation of Rumilly, succeeding her mother in 1632. Saint Francis de Sales was her godfather and guardian.
- John William Fletcher (1729–1785) was an Anglican priest and theologian associated with the Methodist movement.

== Titles, rights, and offices ==
Throughout their history, the La Fléchère were:

- The La Fléchère family held the titles of Counts of Alex and of Veyrier-Châtillon from 1654, following the marriage of François-Marie de La Fléchère and Marie-Claudine d'Arenthon d'Alex.
- They were also lords of Beauregard (Saint-Jeoire), Bellegarde, La Bruyère, La Caille, Collonges, Crans and Bosse, Culoz, Faucigny, Grens, Lutrin, Molliens, Picaraisin, Ravorée, Rumilly, Saint-Ours, Sallanches, Senoche, Sierne, Vanzy, Villy, and Vuad, and held co-lordship over Cormand, Douvres, Hauteville, Mieussy, and Semine.

Members of the family served as châtelains of:

- Arlod and La Tour de Châtel (September 1466–January 1490);
- Faucigny (1441–1462; 1463–1466);
- Flumet (1450–1465);
- Mornex (1420–1439).

== Possessions ==
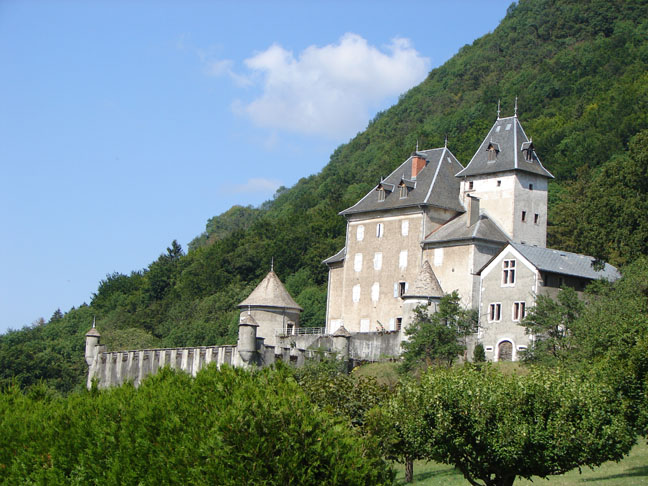
Beauregard Castle.

- The Château de Beauregard, also known as La Fléchère, was built in the 13th century on the slopes of the Herbette mountain, northwest of Saint-Jeoire in Faucigny. It was held by the La Fléchère family from 1236 to 2004. In 2008, the last owner, Roger de La Fléchère, donated the castle to the Diocese of Annecy, which entrusted it to the Fraternité Eucharistein, a religious community inspired by Franciscan spirituality.
- Château de Bellegarde, in Sallanches.
- Château de Vanzy, known as La Fléchère, in Vanzy (Haute-Savoie).
- The La Fléchère tower, in the outskirts of Concise (now a hamlet of Thonon), played a role during the Bernese occupation.
- Towards the end of the eighteenth century, Henri-Louis de La Fléchère owned the large winegrower’s house of La Viborne (8, route de Germagny) at Mont-sur-Rolle.

== See also ==
- County of Savoy
- Order of Saints Maurice and Lazarus
- Savoyard state

== Bibliography ==
- Chaix d'Est-Ange, Gustave (1922). Dictionnaire des familles françaises anciennes ou notables à la fin du XIXe siècle [Dictionary of ancient or noble French families at the end of the 19th-century.] (in French). Vol. XVIII Fel.-For. Évreux: Charles Hérissey. p. 187. OCLC 1449081547 – via Gallica at the Bibliothèque nationale de France (BNP).
- Dutailly, Didier (2011). "La mort du dernier comte de La Fléchère" [The death of the last Count of La Fléchère] (PDF). Le Bénon (in French) (73): 8–11. Archived from the original (PDF) on March 3, 2016.
- de Foras, Amédée (1910). "Armorial et nobiliaire de l'ancien duché de Savoie (vol.2)" [Armorial and nobility of the former Duchy of Savoy (vol. 2)] (in French). Grenoble: Allier Frères. pp. 388–398 – via Gallica at the Bibliothèque nationale de France (BNP).
- Germain, Michel (2007). Personnages illustres des Savoie : "de viris illustribus" [Famous figures of Savoy: “de viris illustribus”] (in French). Lyon: Autre Vue. p. 337. ISBN 978-2-915688-15-3. OCLC 181827019.
