= Nancy-sur-Cluses =

Nancy-sur-Cluses Nanfi (Savoyard)
- Commune
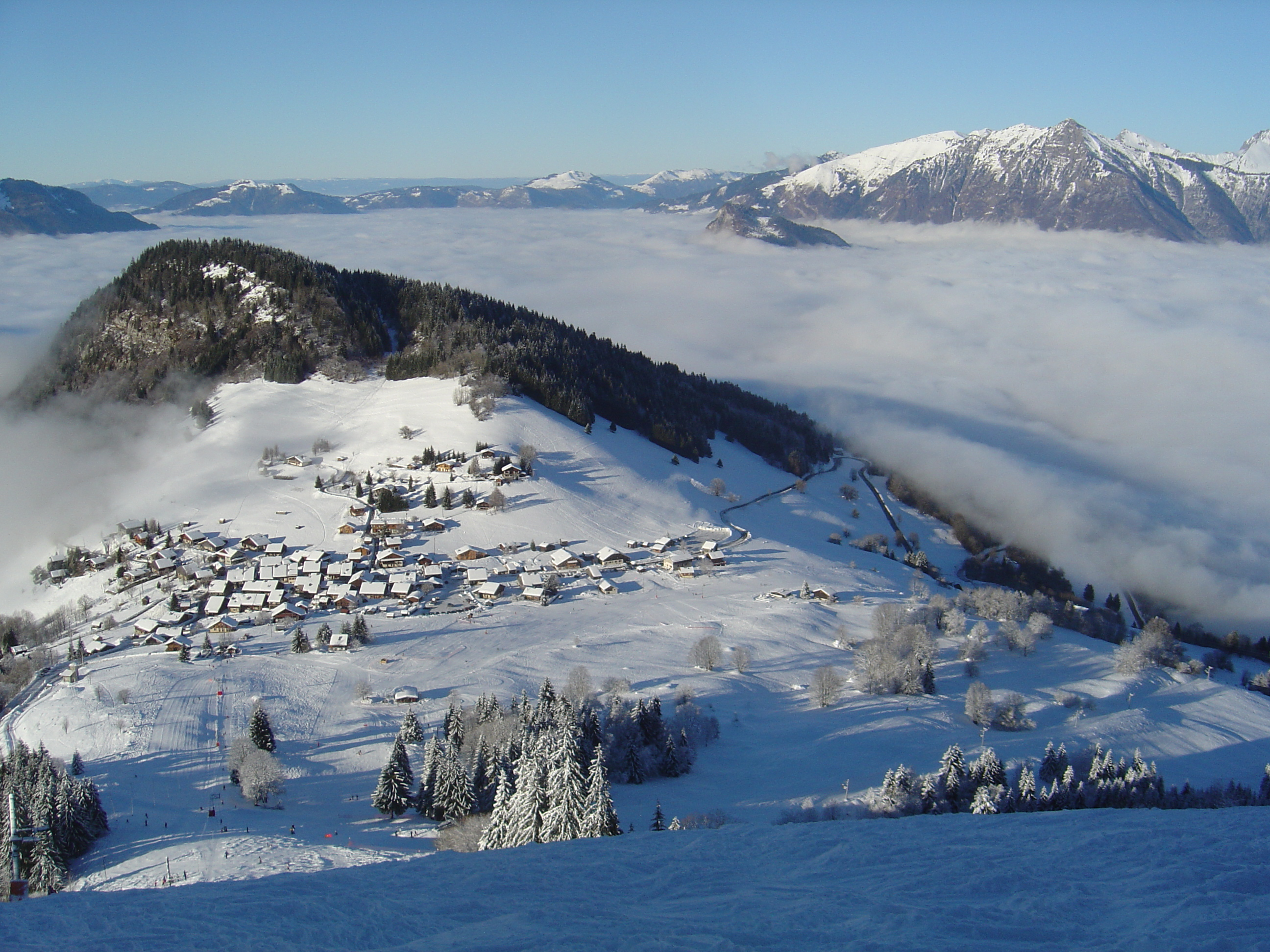
- View of the Romme ski resort

- Coat of arms
- Location of Nancy-sur-Cluses
- Location within France Location within Auvergne-Rhône-Alpes
- Coordinates: 46°02′39″N 6°34′41″E
- Country: France
- Region: Auvergne-Rhône-Alpes
- Department: Haute-Savoie
- Arrondissement: Bonneville
- Canton: Cluses

Government
  - Mayor (2020–2026): Alain Roux
- Area^{1}: 14.22 km^{2} (5.49 sq mi)
- Highest elevation: 2,183 m (7,162 ft)
- Lowest elevation: 680 m (2,230 ft)
- Population (2023): 463
  - Density: 32.6/km^{2} (84.3/sq mi)
- Time zone: UTC+01:00 (CET)
  - Summer (DST): UTC+02:00 (CEST)
- INSEE/Postal code: 74196 /74300
- ^{1} French Land Register data, which excludes lakes, ponds, glaciers > 1 km^{2} (0.386 sq mi or 247 acres) and river estuaries.

Nancy-sur-Cluses (French pronunciation: [nɑ̃si syʁ klyz], literally Nancy on Cluses; Savoyard: Nanfi) is a commune in the Haute-Savoie department in the Auvergne-Rhône-Alpes region in south-eastern France. In 2022 Nancy-sur-Cluses counted 466 inhabitants.

== Tourism ==
Romme-sur-Cluses is a 1,292 m (4,239 ft) high resort located at 10 km (6.2 mi) from Cluses. Nancy-sur-Cluses provides also a large choice of familiar hikes around the Aravis massif of mountains.

== See also ==
- Communes of the Haute-Savoie department
