= Châtillon-sur-Cluses =

Châtillon-sur-Cluses Shâtlyon (Savoyard)
- Commune
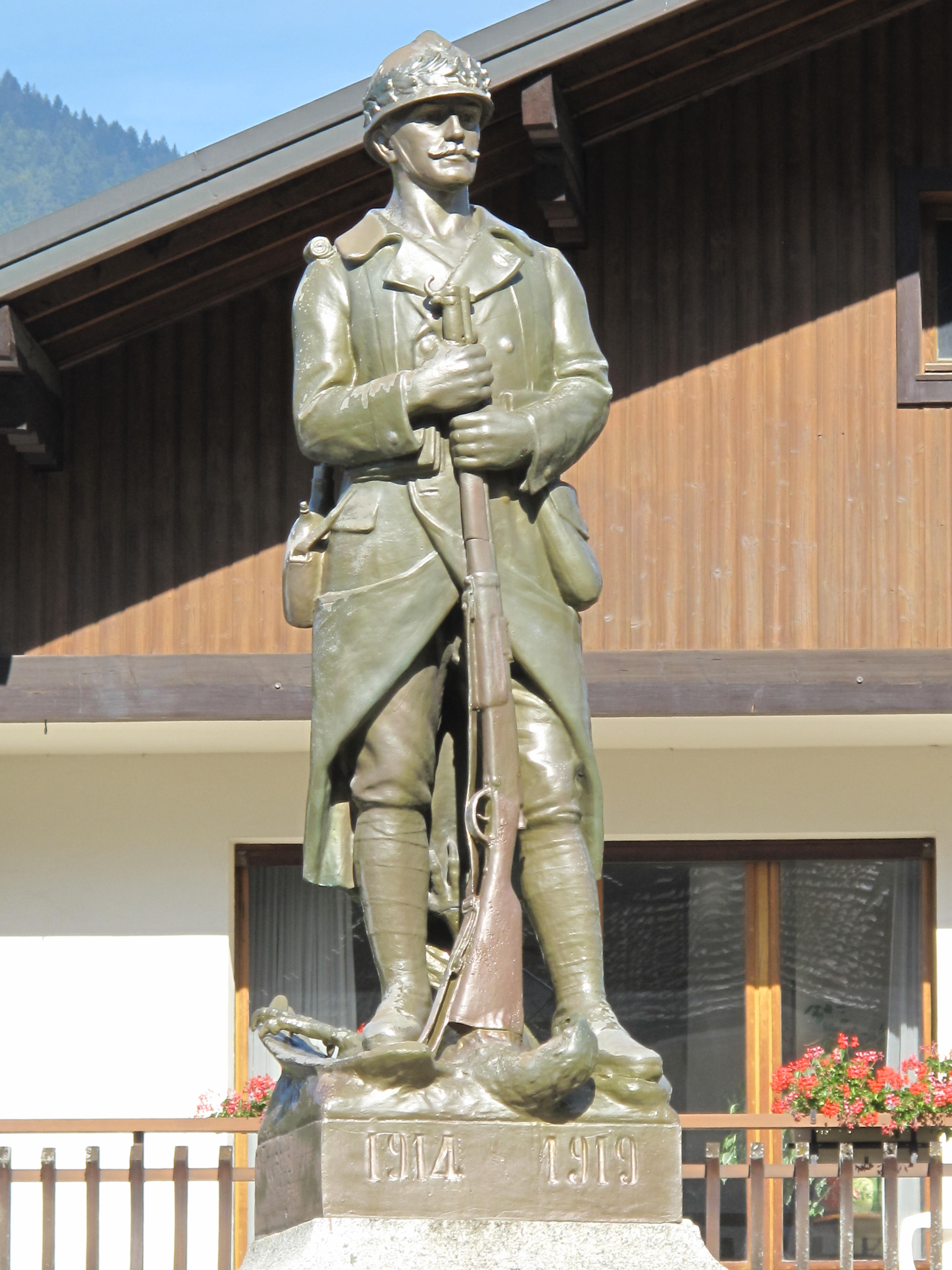
- War memorial

- Coat of arms
- Location of Châtillon-sur-Cluses
- Location within France Location within Auvergne-Rhône-Alpes
- Coordinates: 46°05′16″N 6°34′59″E
- Country: France
- Region: Auvergne-Rhône-Alpes
- Department: Haute-Savoie
- Arrondissement: Bonneville
- Canton: Cluses

Government
  - Mayor (2020–2026): Cyril Cathelineau
- Area^{1}: 9.18 km^{2} (3.54 sq mi)
- Highest elevation: 1,347 m (4,419 ft)
- Lowest elevation: 520 m (1,710 ft)
- Population (2023): 1,250
  - Density: 136/km^{2} (353/sq mi)
- Demonym: Cassandrin / cassandrine
- Time zone: UTC+01:00 (CET)
  - Summer (DST): UTC+02:00 (CEST)
- INSEE/Postal code: 74064 /74300
- ^{1} French Land Register data, which excludes lakes, ponds, glaciers > 1 km^{2} (0.386 sq mi or 247 acres) and river estuaries.

Châtillon-sur-Cluses (French pronunciation: [ʃatijɔ̃ syʁ klyz], literally Châtillon on Cluses; Savoyard: Shâtlyon) is a commune in the Haute-Savoie department in the Auvergne-Rhône-Alpes region in south-eastern France.

== See also ==
- Communes of the Haute-Savoie department
