= Pont Vieux (Cluses) =

Bridge in France

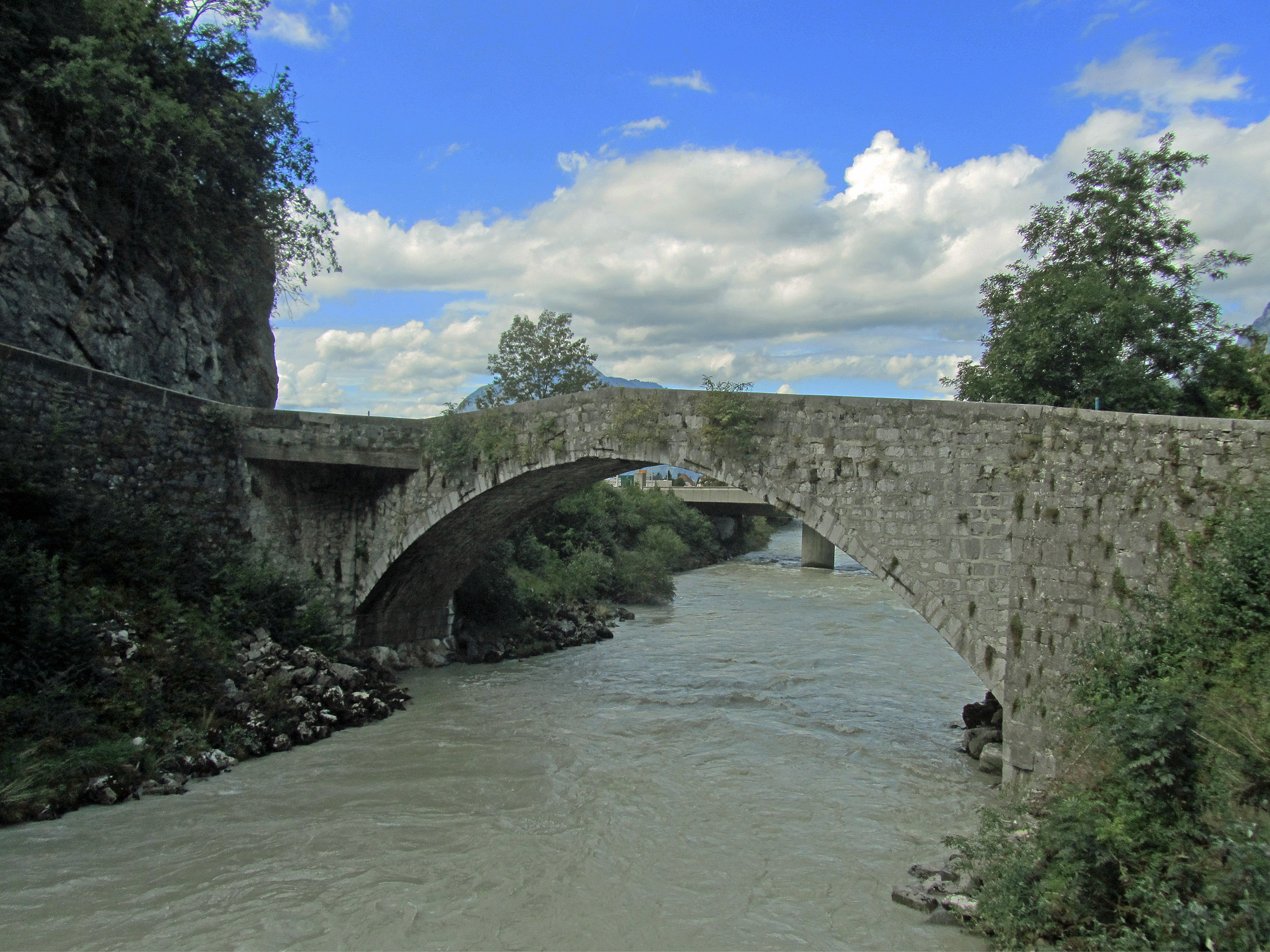
- Coordinates: 46.056457°N 6.579467°E
- Carries: Road
- Crosses: Arve
- Locale: Cluses, Haute-Savoie, Auvergne-Rhône-Alpes, France

Characteristics
- No. of spans: 1

Location
- Interactive map of Pont Vieux

Pont Vieux (Old Bridge) is a bridge at Cluses, a commune in the Haute-Savoie department in the Auvergne-Rhône-Alpes region in southeastern France. It spans the river Arve.

The span of the arch is 25.50 square metres (274.5 sq ft).

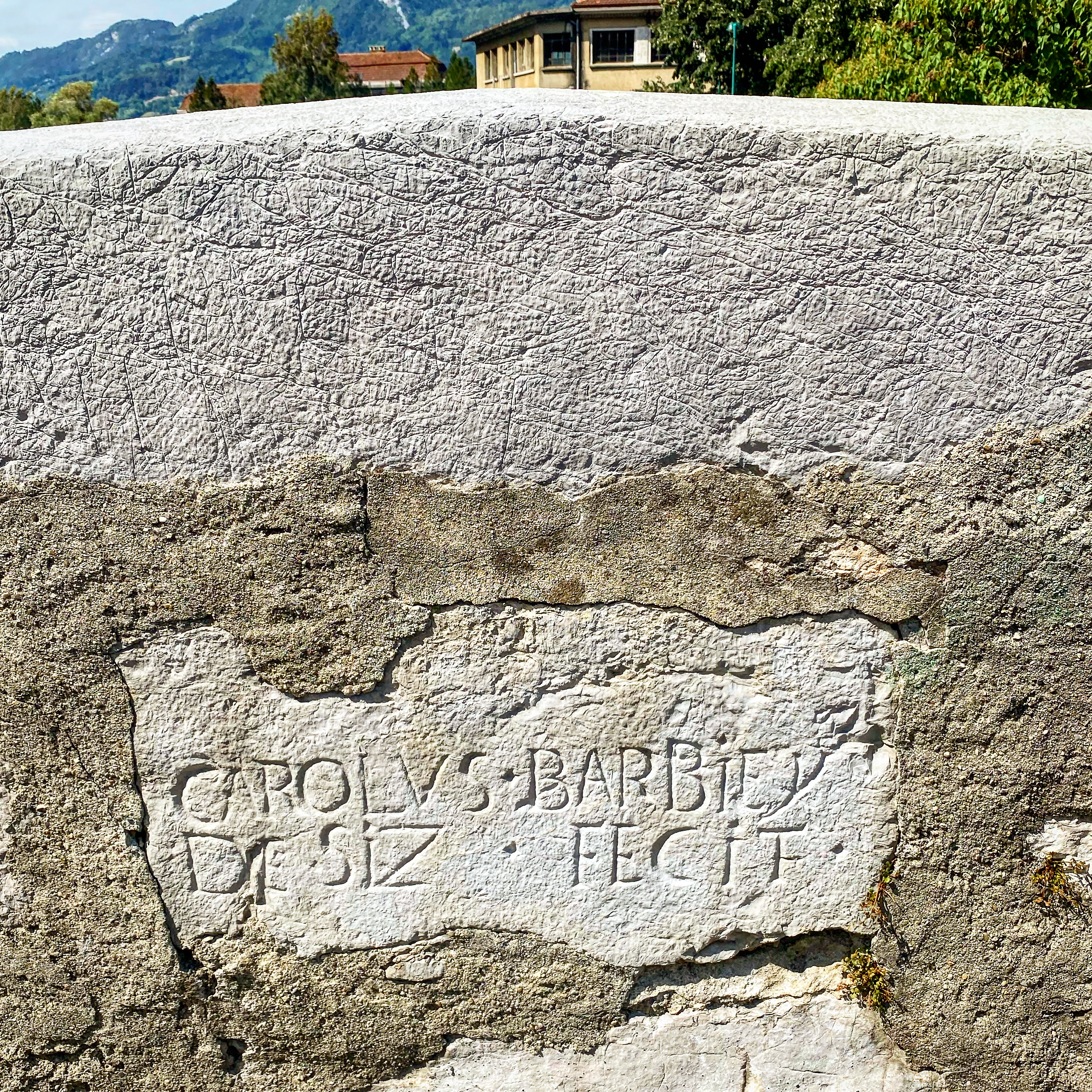
Maker's inscription: Carolus Barbiey de Siz Fecit

This bridge was the only crossing on the Arve until the construction of the Pont Neuf ("New Bridge") in 1850. The current bridge was built in 1674 and restored in 1833. A graffito carved in stone mentions the name of the builder, Charles Barbier; the architect was François Guénot, who usually worked for Charles Emmanuel II, Duke of Savoy.

The bridge replaces an earlier structure, built during the Roman occupation, and rebuilt in the Middle Ages.

It has been a registered historic monument since 1975.
