= Mont-Saxonnex =

Mont-Saxonnex L Mon (Savoyard)
- Commune
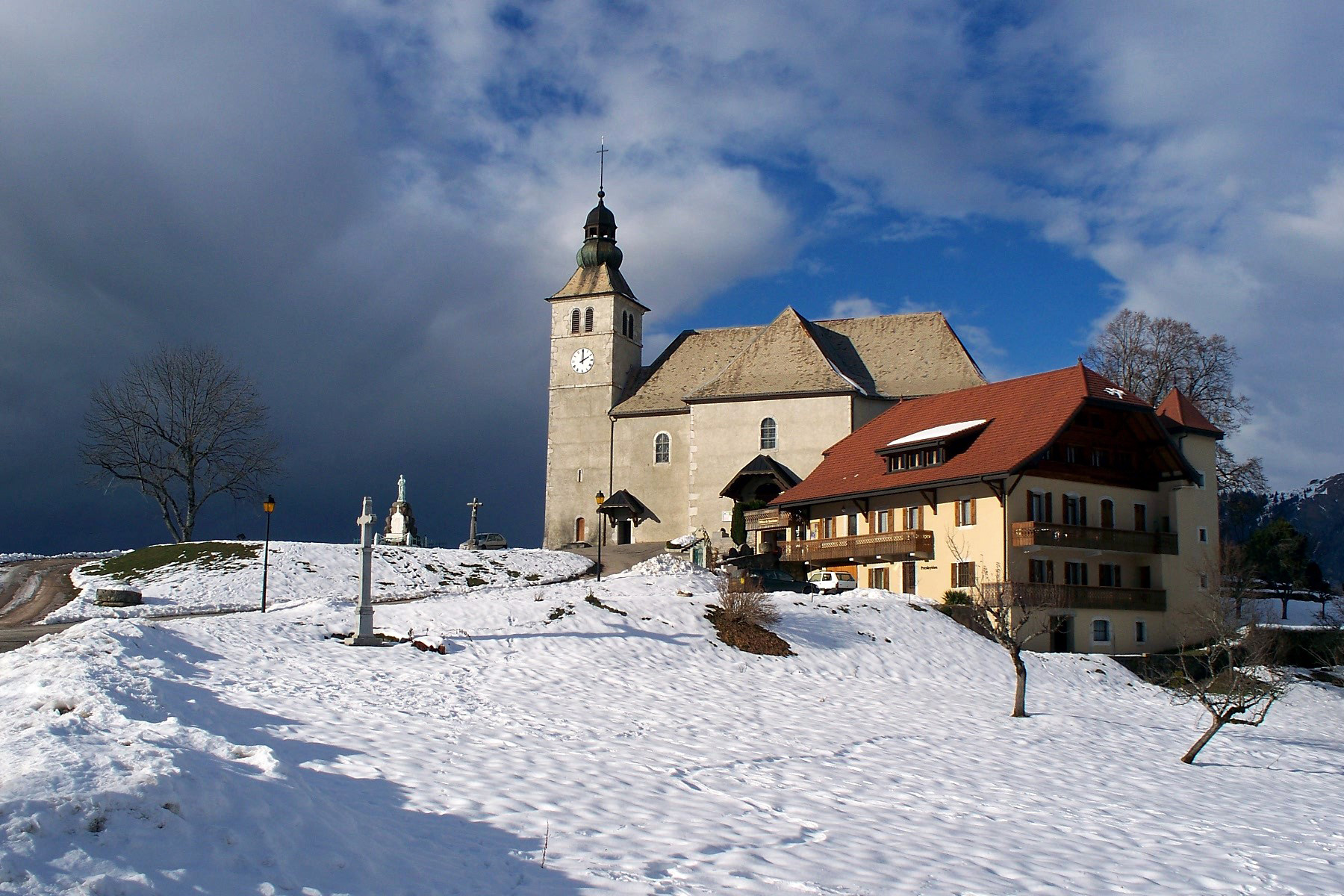
- The church of Mont-Saxonnex

- Coat of arms
- Location of Mont-Saxonnex
- Location within France Location within Auvergne-Rhône-Alpes
- Coordinates: 46°03′17″N 6°29′06″E
- Country: France
- Region: Auvergne-Rhône-Alpes
- Department: Haute-Savoie
- Arrondissement: Bonneville
- Canton: Cluses

Government
  - Mayor (2020–2026): Frédéric Caul-Futy
- Area^{1}: 26.28 km^{2} (10.15 sq mi)
- Highest elevation: 2,438 m (7,999 ft)
- Lowest elevation: 580 m (1,900 ft)
- Population (2023): 1,622
  - Density: 61.72/km^{2} (159.9/sq mi)
- Demonym: Dumonts
- Time zone: UTC+01:00 (CET)
  - Summer (DST): UTC+02:00 (CEST)
- INSEE/Postal code: 74189 /74130
- Website: mont-saxonnex.fr
- ^{1} French Land Register data, which excludes lakes, ponds, glaciers > 1 km^{2} (0.386 sq mi or 247 acres) and river estuaries.

Mont-Saxonnex (French pronunciation: [mɔ̃ saksɔnɛ]; Savoyard: L Mon) is a commune in the Haute-Savoie department in the Auvergne-Rhône-Alpes region in south-eastern France.

== Toponymy ==
Mont-Saxonnex (pronounced Saxonney) is said to take its name from mons saxorum nigrorum, meaning "mountain of black rocks." Legend has it that a fire in the Middle Ages lasted seven years, turning the rocks as black as coal. Another explanation attributes the name to a Roman named Sersunay. Saxonnex could also come from an Indo-European legend involving Neptune (nay). This legend relates that the region was saved from the overflowing of Lake Bénit by a procession of priests who circled it three times.

Mont Saxonnex is attested as Sersenaco in 1339. The derivation -aco is a typically Gaulish location suffix. It is a Celtic place name composed of two roots: serra- "scythe, sickle, billhook" and -senos "ancient, old." In Gaulish, Sersenaco means something like "the domain of the old man with the scythe" or "the domain of the old reaper" (a link with the appearance of the neighboring Bargy?).

In Franco-Provençal, the name of the commune is written L Mon, according to the spelling of Conflans.

== See also ==
- Communes of the Haute-Savoie department
