= Le Reposoir =

Le Reposoir Le Rpojeû (Savoyard)
- Commune
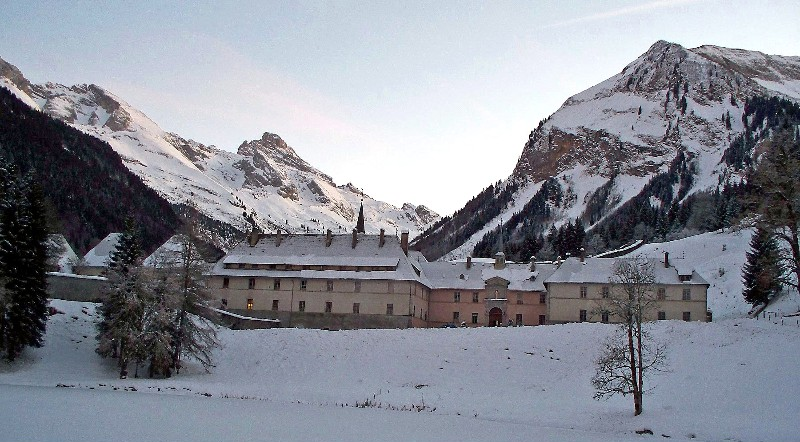
- The Charterhouse of Le Reposoir
- Location of Le Reposoir
- Location within France Location within Auvergne-Rhône-Alpes
- Coordinates: 46°00′43″N 6°32′09″E
- Country: France
- Region: Auvergne-Rhône-Alpes
- Department: Haute-Savoie
- Arrondissement: Bonneville
- Canton: Cluses

Government
  - Mayor (2020–2026): Marie-Pierre Pernat
- Area^{1}: 37.36 km^{2} (14.42 sq mi)
- Highest elevation: 2,749 m (9,019 ft)
- Lowest elevation: 820 m (2,690 ft)
- Population (2023): 565
  - Density: 15.1/km^{2} (39.2/sq mi)
- Time zone: UTC+01:00 (CET)
  - Summer (DST): UTC+02:00 (CEST)
- INSEE/Postal code: 74221 /74950
- Website: www.lereposoir.fr
- ^{1} French Land Register data, which excludes lakes, ponds, glaciers > 1 km^{2} (0.386 sq mi or 247 acres) and river estuaries.

Le Reposoir (French pronunciation: [lə ʁəpozwaʁ]; Savoyard: Le Rpojeû) is a commune in the Haute-Savoie department in the Auvergne-Rhône-Alpes region in south-eastern France.

== Geography ==
Situated at the foot of the Col de la Colombière and is known as one of the most picturesque regions of the Savoyard Pre-Alps. The Foron River runs through the valley and is a tributary of the Arve River.

== History ==
The history of the village is often confused with the foundation of the Chartreuse monastery, founded in 1151 at the behest of Aymon I de Faucigny. The monks cleared and valued the land for farming and established the pastoral and agricultural life, which in turn brought inhabitants seeking a life of work and prayer.

Le Reposoir means 'The Resting Place'.

== Monuments ==
The Chartreuse monastery is situated in a wooded cirque within, though aside, from Le Reposoir village. Overlooking a picturesque lake, the tranquillity of the monastery is a popular attraction of Le Reposoir.

Founded in 1151 by Jean d'Espagne at the behest of Aymon I de Faucigny, the monastery survived many trials and tribulations, including the French Revolution, various levels of destruction and pillaging over the ages and finally expulsion of the monks in 1901, after which it was transformed into a hotel. The Chartreuse was bought by Alessandra di Rudinì, daughter of former Italian Prime Minister Antonio Starabba, Marchese di Rudinì, in 1922. She then converted to Catholicism and entered the Carmelite order. In 1932 the restored Chartreuse became Carmelite.

The Chartreuse monastery now houses approximately twenty nuns.

== Activities ==
The village is the point of departure for hiking to the summit of Pointe Percée (Summit of the Aravis Ranges) as well as many other regional hikes. Skiing is a popular activity in the village - the village houses its own ski lift and neighbours Le Grand-Bornand ski resort.

Rock climbing surrounds the village, with a number of popular cliff faces within easy driving distance.

Le Reposoir is also a thoroughfare for the Tour de France and a very popular route for cyclists.

== Personalities ==
Setting of an episode of Pierre Bonte's celebrated "Bonjour Monsieur le Maire" in 1967.

Valéry Giscard d'Estaing, former President of France, chose Le Reposoir as the site of celebrations for his fourth anniversary of his election to the Presidency of the Republic of France.

== See also ==
- Communes of the Haute-Savoie department
