= Canton of Cluses =

Coordinates: 46.06°N 6.58°E

The canton of Cluses is an administrative division of the Haute-Savoie department, southeastern France. Its borders were modified at the French canton reorganisation which came into effect in March 2015. Its seat is in Cluses.

It consists of the following communes:

1. Châtillon-sur-Cluses
2. Cluses
3. Marnaz
4. Mieussy
5. Mont-Saxonnex
6. Morillon
7. Nancy-sur-Cluses
8. Le Reposoir
9. La Rivière-Enverse
10. Saint-Sigismond
11. Samoëns
12. Scionzier
13. Sixt-Fer-à-Cheval
14. Taninges
15. Thyez
16. Verchaix
