= Verchaix =

Verchaix Varshé (Savoyard)
- Commune
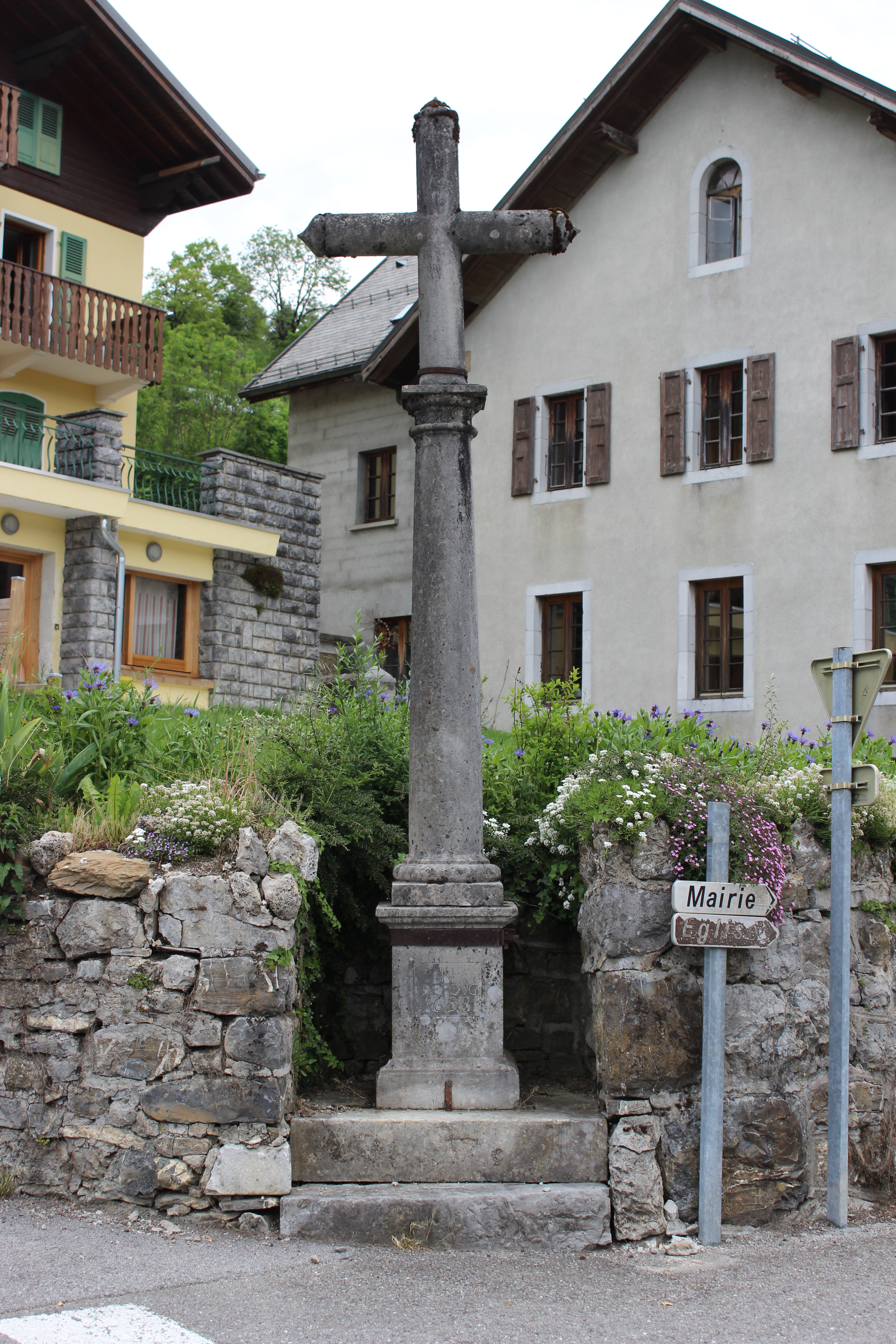

- Coat of arms
- Location of Verchaix
- Location within France Location within Auvergne-Rhône-Alpes
- Coordinates: 46°05′50″N 6°40′37″E
- Country: France
- Region: Auvergne-Rhône-Alpes
- Department: Haute-Savoie
- Arrondissement: Bonneville
- Canton: Cluses

Government
  - Mayor (2020–2026): Joël Vaudey
- Area^{1}: 15.89 km^{2} (6.14 sq mi)
- Elevation: 788 m (2,585 ft)
- Highest elevation: 2,092 m (6,864 ft)
- Lowest elevation: 654 m (2,146 ft)
- Population (2023): 830
  - Density: 52/km^{2} (140/sq mi)
- Time zone: UTC+01:00 (CET)
  - Summer (DST): UTC+02:00 (CEST)
- INSEE/Postal code: 74294 /74440
- ^{1} French Land Register data, which excludes lakes, ponds, glaciers > 1 km^{2} (0.386 sq mi or 247 acres) and river estuaries.

Verchaix (Savoyard: Varshé) is a commune in the Haute-Savoie department in the Auvergne-Rhône-Alpes region in south-eastern France.

== Geography ==
Verchaix is located on a small plateau above the north bank of the river Giffre. The commune spans an altitude of 654m to 2092m.

== Industry ==
There are a small number of hotels and restaurants and Verchaix is a summer and skiing holiday destination.

== Name ==
The name Verchaix is taken from the verdant south-facing slopes that have traditionally been used in viticulture.

== See also ==
- Communes of the Haute-Savoie department
