= Thyez =

Thyez Tî (Savoyard)
- Commune
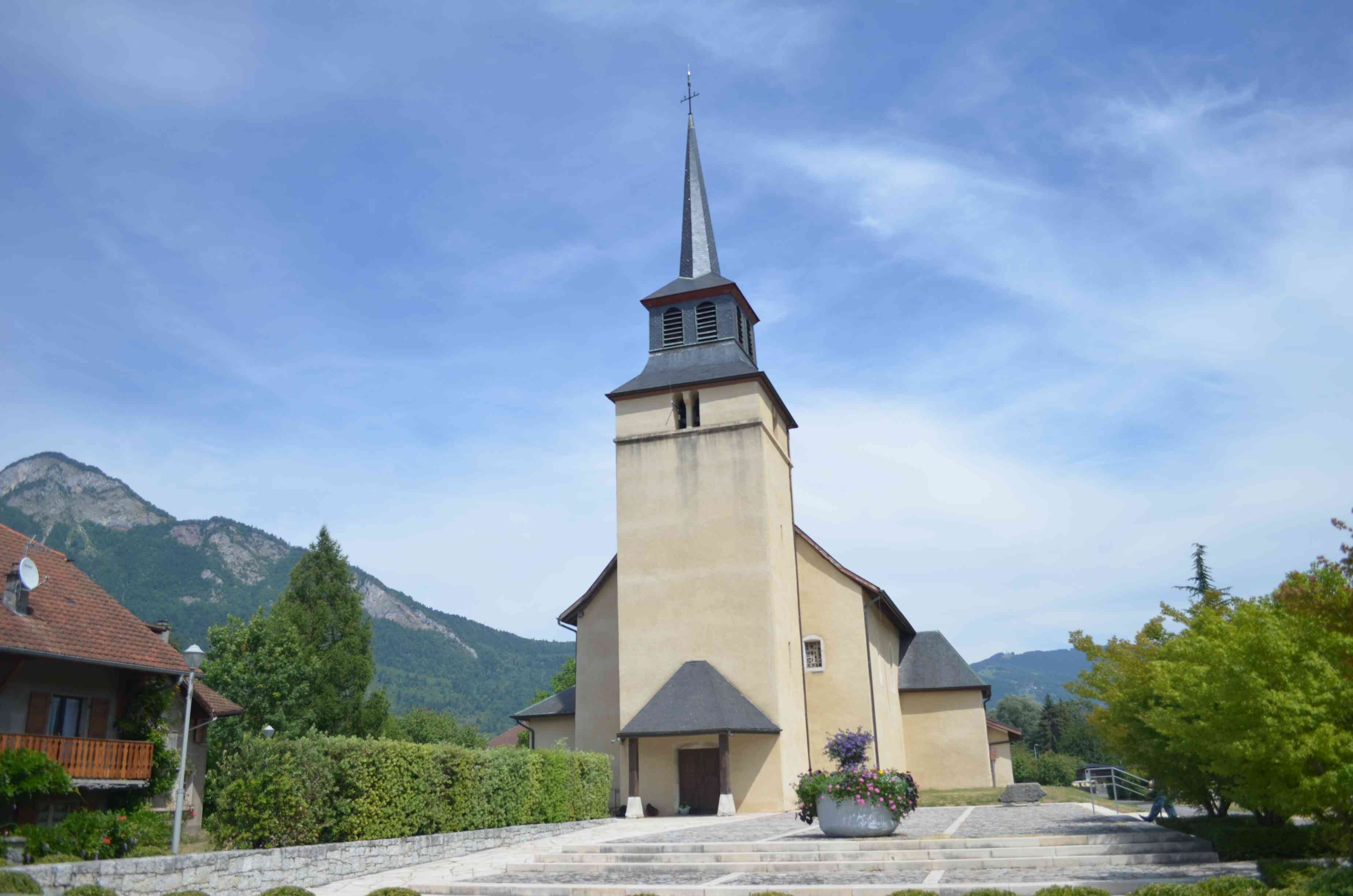
- Church of Saint-Théodule

- Coat of arms
- Location of Thyez
- Location within France Location within Auvergne-Rhône-Alpes
- Coordinates: 46°05′04″N 6°32′30″E
- Country: France
- Region: Auvergne-Rhône-Alpes
- Department: Haute-Savoie
- Arrondissement: Bonneville
- Canton: Cluses

Government
  - Mayor (2020–2026): Fabrice Gyselinck
- Area^{1}: 9.81 km^{2} (3.79 sq mi)
- Highest elevation: 1,347 m (4,419 ft)
- Lowest elevation: 461 m (1,512 ft)
- Population (2023): 6,309
  - Density: 643/km^{2} (1,670/sq mi)
- Time zone: UTC+01:00 (CET)
  - Summer (DST): UTC+02:00 (CEST)
- INSEE/Postal code: 74278 /74300
- Website: Thyez.net
- ^{1} French Land Register data, which excludes lakes, ponds, glaciers > 1 km^{2} (0.386 sq mi or 247 acres) and river estuaries.

Thyez (French pronunciation: [tje]; Savoyard: Tî) is a commune in the Haute-Savoie department in the Auvergne-Rhône-Alpes region in south-eastern France.

== Population ==
Historical population
Year	Pop.	±% p.a.
1968	1,281	—
1975	1,935	+6.07%
1982	3,117	+7.05%
1990	4,109	+3.51%
1999	4,873	+1.91%
2007	5,421	+1.34%
2012	5,762	+1.23%
2017	6,198	+1.47%
2023	6,309	+0.30%
Source: INSEE

== See also ==
- Communes of the Haute-Savoie department
