= Saint-Sigismond, Haute-Savoie =

Saint-Sigismond San-Fimon (Savoyard)
- Commune
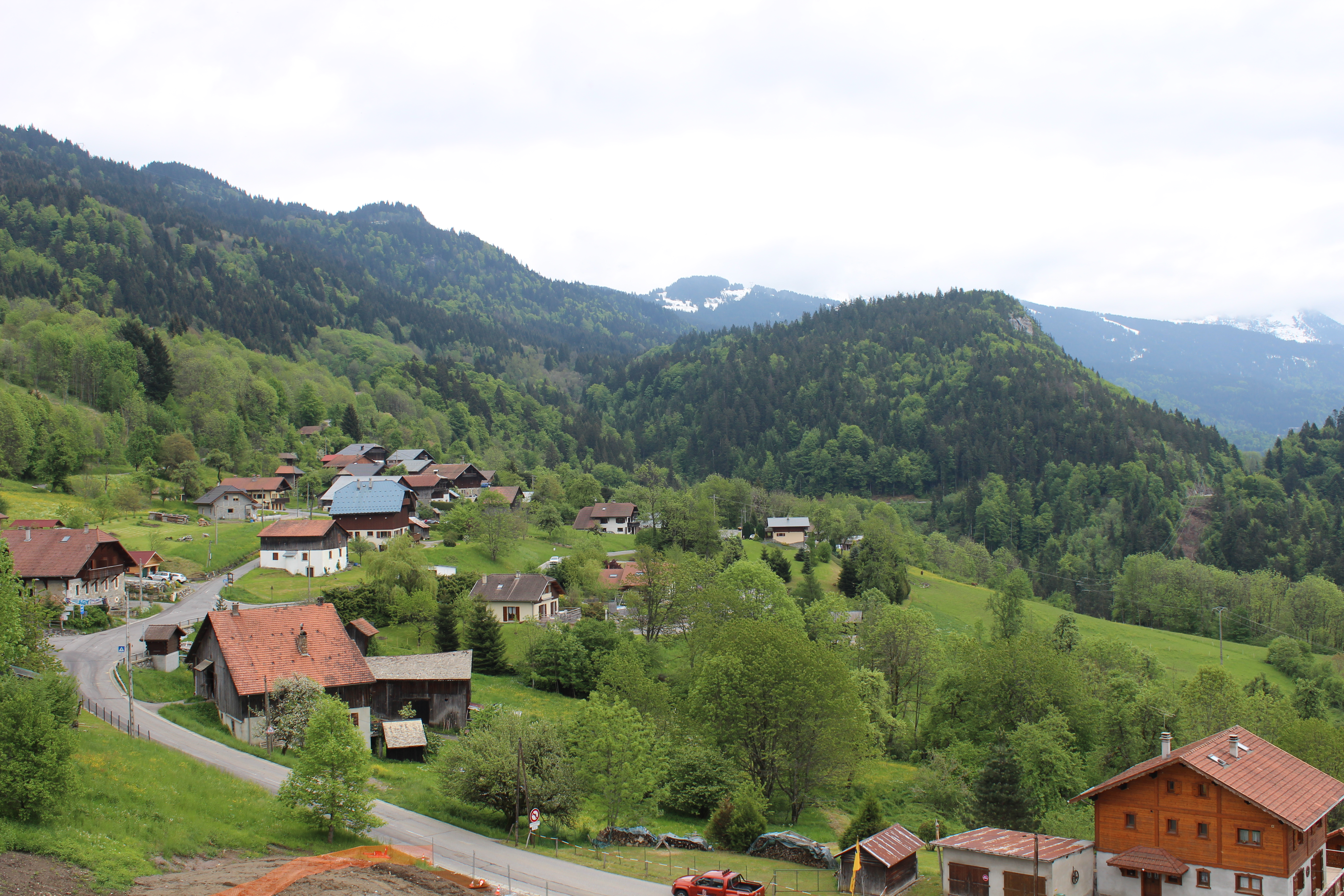

- Coat of arms
- Location of Saint-Sigismond
- Location within France Location within Auvergne-Rhône-Alpes
- Coordinates: 46°04′23″N 6°36′55″E
- Country: France
- Region: Auvergne-Rhône-Alpes
- Department: Haute-Savoie
- Arrondissement: Bonneville
- Canton: Cluses

Government
  - Mayor (2020–2026): Éric Missillier
- Area^{1}: 7.92 km^{2} (3.06 sq mi)
- Highest elevation: 1,420 m (4,660 ft)
- Lowest elevation: 620 m (2,030 ft)
- Population (2023): 641
  - Density: 80.9/km^{2} (210/sq mi)
- Time zone: UTC+01:00 (CET)
  - Summer (DST): UTC+02:00 (CEST)
- INSEE/Postal code: 74252 /74300
- ^{1} French Land Register data, which excludes lakes, ponds, glaciers > 1 km^{2} (0.386 sq mi or 247 acres) and river estuaries.

Saint-Sigismond (French pronunciation: [sɛ̃ siʒismɔ̃]; Savoyard: San-Fimon) is a commune in the Haute-Savoie department in the Auvergne-Rhône-Alpes region in south-eastern France.

== See also ==
- Communes of the Haute-Savoie department
