= Taninges =

Taninges Tanyinzhe (Savoyard)
- Commune
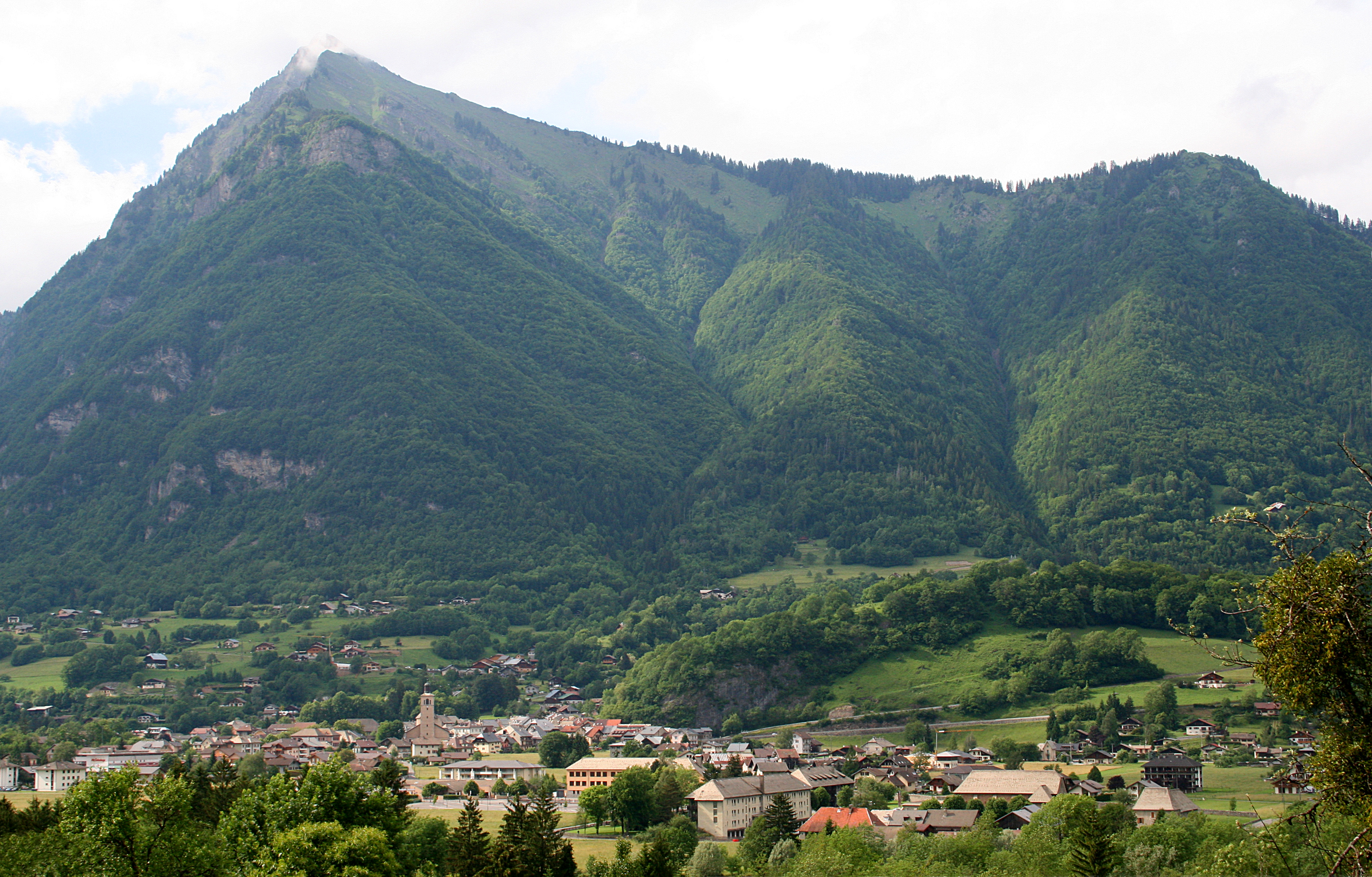
- The village and the Pic de Marcelly

- Coat of arms
- Location of Taninges
- Location within France Location within Auvergne-Rhône-Alpes
- Coordinates: 46°06′29″N 6°35′32″E
- Country: France
- Region: Auvergne-Rhône-Alpes
- Department: Haute-Savoie
- Arrondissement: Bonneville
- Canton: Cluses
- Area^{1}: 42.66 km^{2} (16.47 sq mi)
- Highest elevation: 2,000 m (6,600 ft)
- Lowest elevation: 609 m (1,998 ft)
- Population (2023): 3,491
  - Density: 81.83/km^{2} (211.9/sq mi)
- Time zone: UTC+01:00 (CET)
  - Summer (DST): UTC+02:00 (CEST)
- INSEE/Postal code: 74276 /74440
- ^{1} French Land Register data, which excludes lakes, ponds, glaciers > 1 km^{2} (0.386 sq mi or 247 acres) and river estuaries.

Taninges (French pronunciation: [tanɛ̃ʒ]; Savoyard: Tanyinzhe) is a commune in the Haute-Savoie department in the Auvergne-Rhône-Alpes region in south-eastern France.

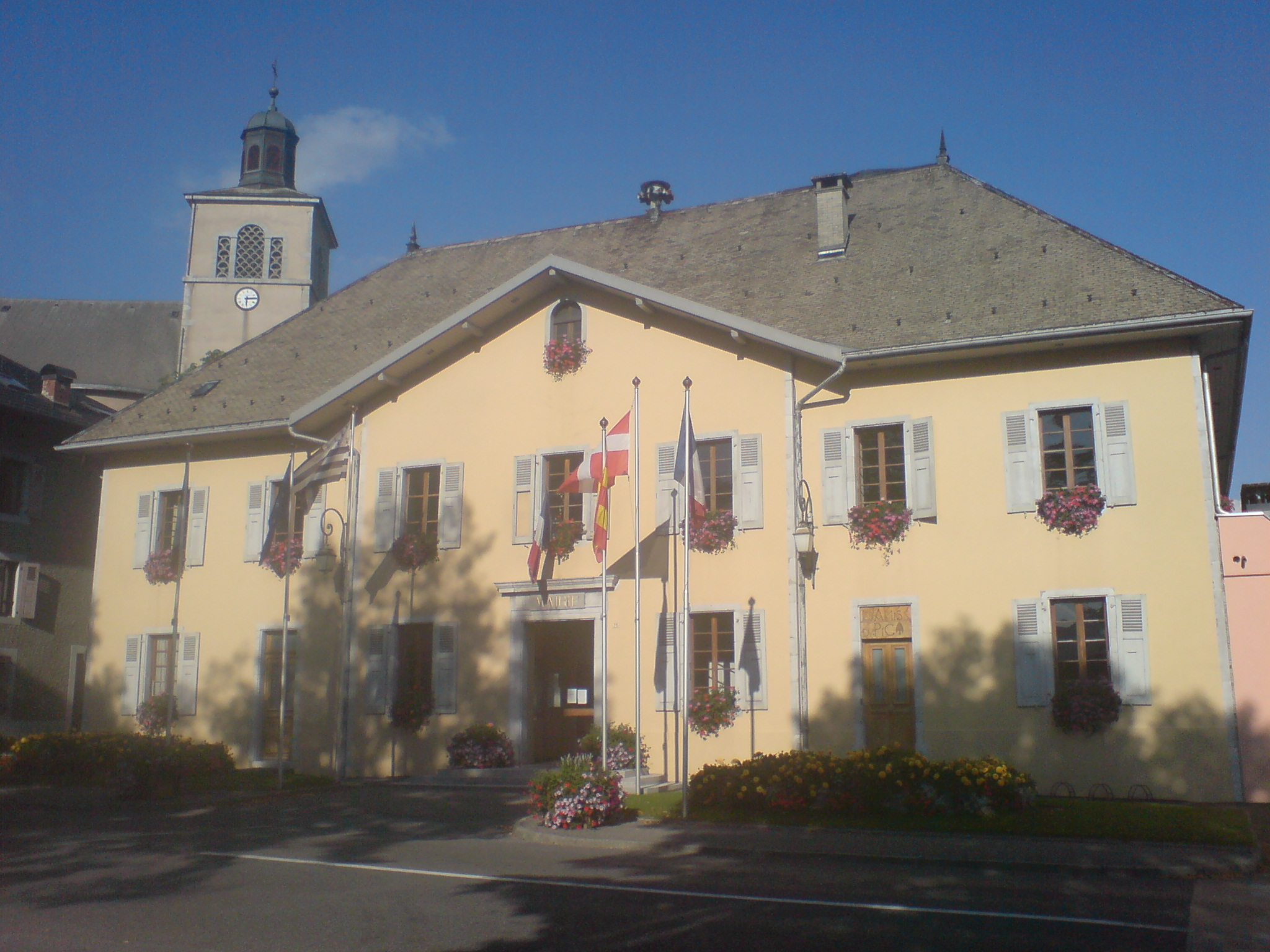
Mairie

Taninges is a pleasant town of over 3000 people in the French Alps, about 35 km directly east-southeast of Geneva and close to the commune of Cluses. It dates back to Roman times, and some Roman cobblestone mountain tracks are still in existence. The town has hotels, restaurants, cinema, municipal campsite, supermarket and petrol station. A river runs through the town, and there are many walking and cycling tracks in the area. There is also a tourist information centre with internet and multi-lingual staff in the centre of the town.

== Population ==
Historical population
Year	Pop.	±% p.a.
1968	2,109	—
1975	2,354	+1.58%
1982	2,682	+1.88%
1990	2,791	+0.50%
1999	3,140	+1.32%
2007	3,441	+1.15%
2012	3,404	−0.22%
2017	3,443	+0.23%
2023	3,491	+0.23%
Source: INSEE

== Sites ==
Taninges is located close to the ski resorts of Le Praz de Lys, Sommand and Les Gets, popular in the winter. The Carthusian monastery of Mélan, founded in 1285, is on the southeastern edge of the town. In the church tower is a carillon, the first in the département of Haute-Savoie, with 40–50 bells together weighing 3 tonnes. The old bridge (le Vieux pont) in the old town dates from the sixteenth century.

== See also ==
- Communes of the Haute-Savoie department
