= Vanzy =

Vanzy Vanzi (Savoyard)
- Commune
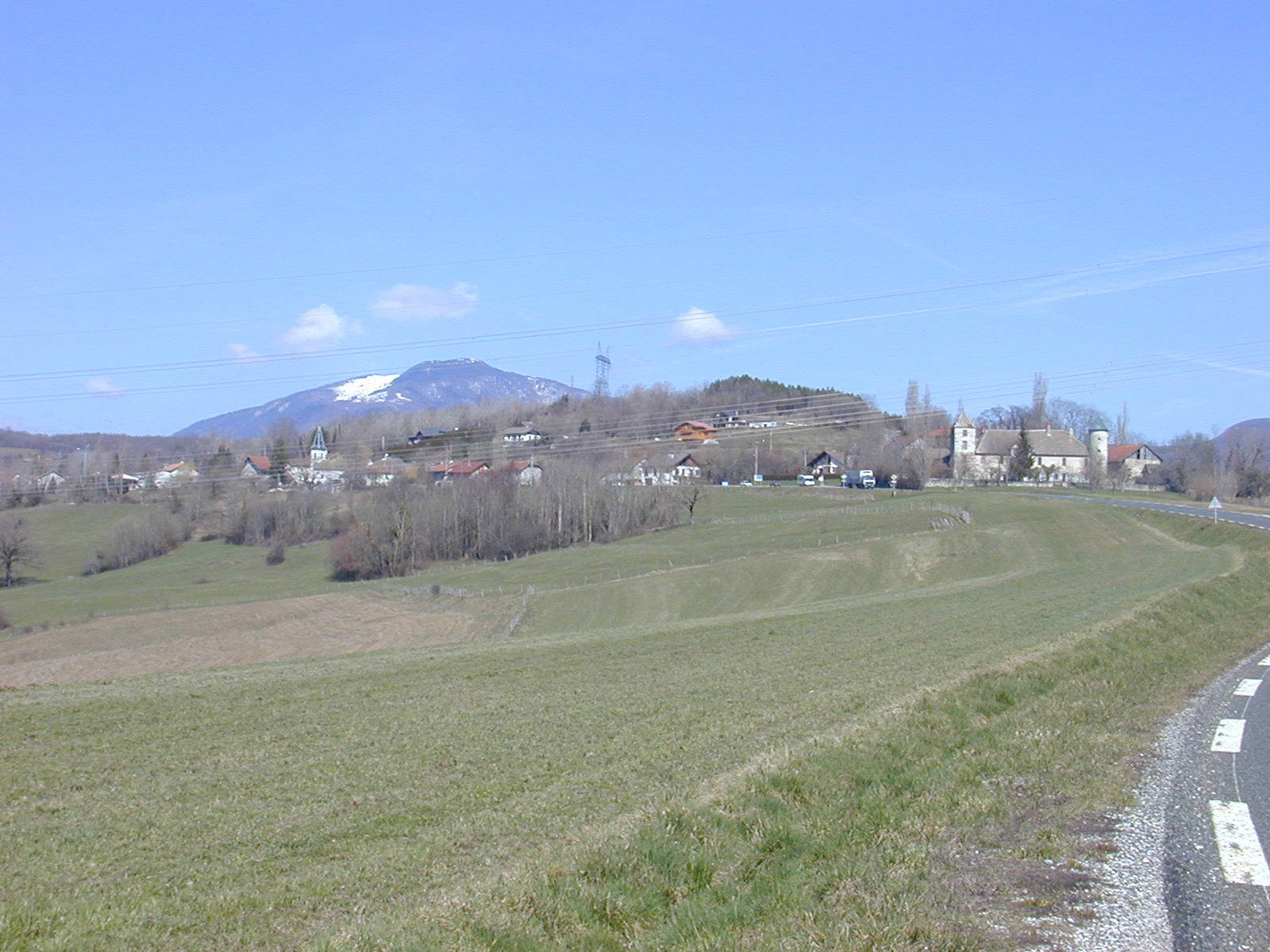
- A general view of Vanzy

- Coat of arms
- Location of Vanzy
- Location within France Location within Auvergne-Rhône-Alpes
- Coordinates: 46°02′35″N 5°53′08″E
- Country: France
- Region: Auvergne-Rhône-Alpes
- Department: Haute-Savoie
- Arrondissement: Saint-Julien-en-Genevois
- Canton: Saint-Julien-en-Genevois
- Intercommunality: CC Usses et Rhône

Government
  - Mayor (2020–2026): Jean-Yves Mâchard
- Area^{1}: 5.57 km^{2} (2.15 sq mi)
- Highest elevation: 537 m (1,762 ft)
- Lowest elevation: 287 m (942 ft)
- Population (2023): 351
  - Density: 63.0/km^{2} (163/sq mi)
- Demonym: Vanziens
- Time zone: UTC+01:00 (CET)
  - Summer (DST): UTC+02:00 (CEST)
- INSEE/Postal code: 74291 /270
- ^{1} French Land Register data, which excludes lakes, ponds, glaciers > 1 km^{2} (0.386 sq mi or 247 acres) and river estuaries.

Vanzy (French pronunciation: [vɑ̃zi]; Savoyard: Vanzi) is a commune in the Haute-Savoie department and Auvergne-Rhône-Alpes region of eastern France.

== See also ==
- Communes of the Haute-Savoie department
