= Scionzier =

Scionzier Scionziér (Savoyard)
- Commune
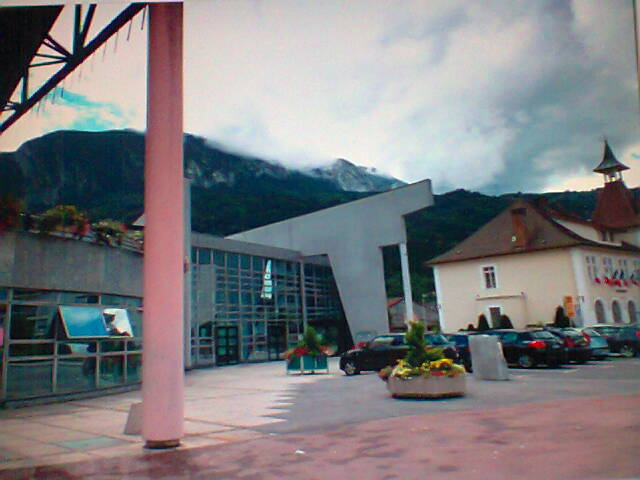
- The town hall in Scionzier

- Coat of arms
- Location of Scionzier
- Location within France Location within Auvergne-Rhône-Alpes
- Coordinates: 46°03′29″N 6°33′01″E
- Country: France
- Region: Auvergne-Rhône-Alpes
- Department: Haute-Savoie
- Arrondissement: Bonneville
- Canton: Cluses

Government
  - Mayor (2023–2026): Sandro Pepin
- Area^{1}: 10.62 km^{2} (4.10 sq mi)
- Highest elevation: 1,969 m (6,460 ft)
- Lowest elevation: 468 m (1,535 ft)
- Population (2023): 9,162
  - Density: 862.7/km^{2} (2,234/sq mi)
- Time zone: UTC+01:00 (CET)
  - Summer (DST): UTC+02:00 (CEST)
- INSEE/Postal code: 74264 /74950
- Website: Scionzier.fr
- ^{1} French Land Register data, which excludes lakes, ponds, glaciers > 1 km^{2} (0.386 sq mi or 247 acres) and river estuaries.

Scionzier (French pronunciation: [sjɔ̃zje]; Savoyard: Scionziér) is a commune in the Haute-Savoie department in the Auvergne-Rhône-Alpes region in south-eastern France.

== Population ==
Historical population
Year	Pop.	±% p.a.
1968	5,046	—
1975	5,702	+1.76%
1982	5,463	−0.61%
1990	5,945	+1.06%
1999	6,163	+0.40%
2007	6,753	+1.15%
2012	7,586	+2.35%
2017	8,683	+2.74%
2023	9,162	+0.90%
Source: INSEE

== See also ==
- Communes of the Haute-Savoie department
