= Cluses =

Cluses Clluses (Savoyard)
- Commune
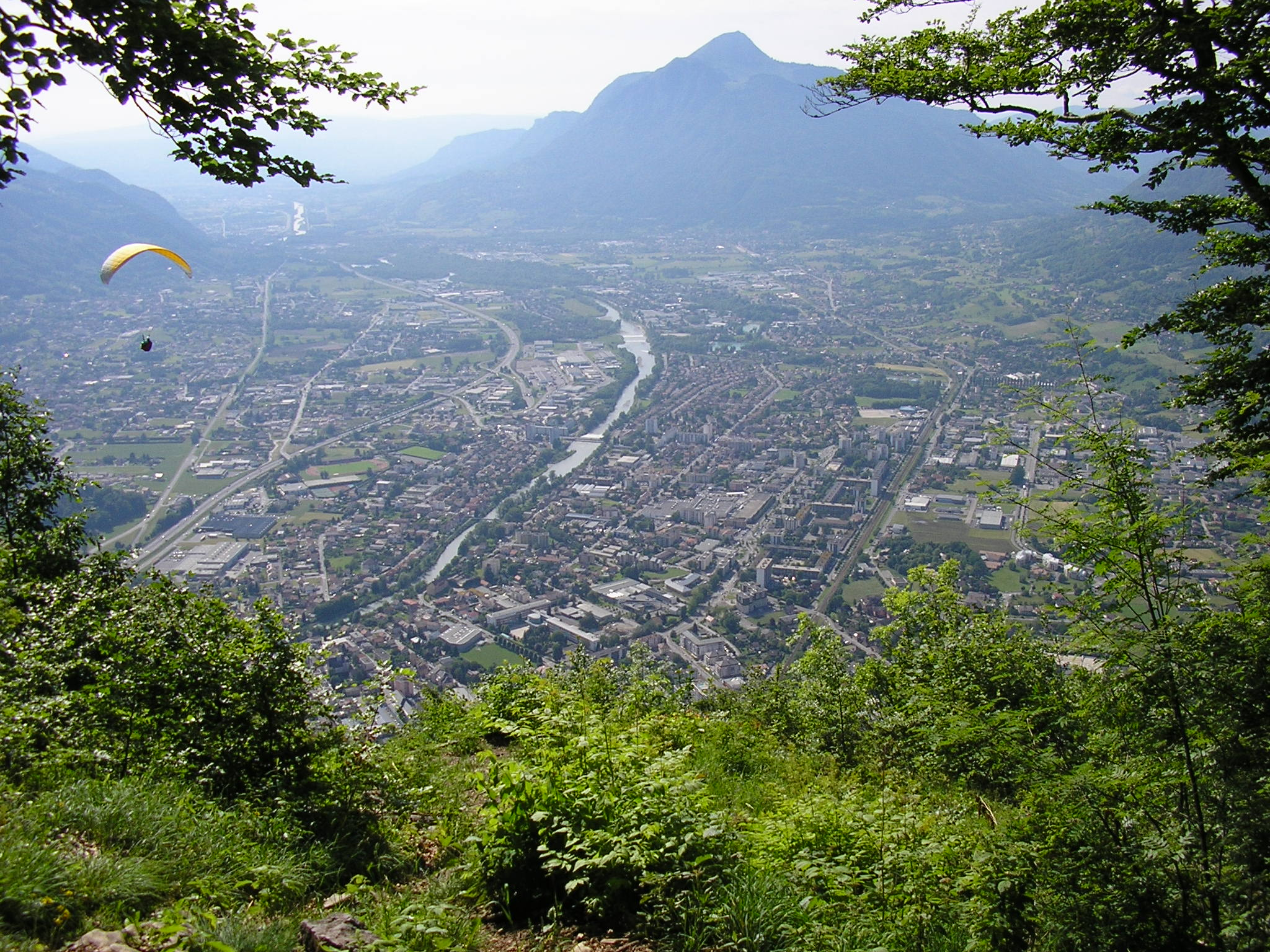
- Cluses as seen from a nearby hillside

- Flag Coat of arms
- Location of Cluses
- Location within France Location within Auvergne-Rhône-Alpes
- Coordinates: 46°03′40″N 6°34′46″E
- Country: France
- Region: Auvergne-Rhône-Alpes
- Department: Haute-Savoie
- Arrondissement: Bonneville
- Canton: Cluses

Government
  - Mayor (2020–2026): Jean-Philippe Mas
- Area^{1}: 10.45 km^{2} (4.03 sq mi)
- Elevation: 485 m (1,591 ft)
- Highest elevation: 1,175 m (3,855 ft)
- Lowest elevation: 470 m (1,540 ft)
- Population (2023): 17,795
  - Density: 1,703/km^{2} (4,410/sq mi)
- Time zone: UTC+01:00 (CET)
  - Summer (DST): UTC+02:00 (CEST)
- INSEE/Postal code: 74081 /74300
- ^{1} French Land Register data, which excludes lakes, ponds, glaciers > 1 km^{2} (0.386 sq mi or 247 acres) and river estuaries.

Cluses (French pronunciation: [klyz]; Savoyard: Clluses) is a commune in the Haute-Savoie department in the Auvergne-Rhône-Alpes region in southeastern France.

Citizens are known as Clusiens. The commune is situated in the Arve Valley, on the river which bears the same name. Cluses is known for its Alpine setting and (during the first part of the 20th century) its watch-making industry.

== Geography ==
The town is located in the Arve Valley, in the region Faucigny. Situated between Geneva and Chamonix, Cluses is located near a number of popular ski slopes.

== Population ==
Historical population

Year	Pop.	±% p.a.
1793	1,609	—
1800	1,823	+1.80%
1806	1,732	−0.85%
1822	1,953	+0.75%
1838	1,970	+0.05%
1848	1,947	−0.12%
1858	1,925	−0.11%
1861	1,585	−6.27%
1866	1,643	+0.72%
1872	1,751	+1.07%
1876	1,813	+0.87%
1881	1,915	+1.10%
1886	1,915	+0.00%
1891	2,126	+2.11%
1896	2,403	+2.48%
1901	2,208	−1.68%
1906	2,141	−0.61%

Year	Pop.	±% p.a.
1911	2,155	+0.13%
1921	2,216	+0.28%
1926	2,408	+1.68%
1931	2,644	+1.89%
1936	3,095	+3.20%
1946	3,416	+0.99%
1954	5,318	+5.69%
1962	8,612	+6.21%
1968	12,455	+6.34%
1975	14,826	+2.52%
1982	15,469	+0.61%
1990	16,358	+0.70%
1999	17,711	+0.89%
2007	17,880	+0.12%
2012	17,525	−0.40%
2017	17,059	−0.54%
2023	17,795	+0.71%

Source: EHESS and INSEE (1968-2023)

== History ==
During the Roman era, a bridge, Pont Vieux was built across the Arve River. Travelers crossing the bridge soon stimulated trade in the area, and the first village was born at the center of the "cluse" (a narrow valley), situated between the mountains and the Arve River. Cluses became an independent commune on 4 May 1310. The Baron Hughes of Faucigny had an important role in the town's evolution as an independent commune.

In 1720, Claude-Joseph Balladoud introduced clockmaking in the Arve Valley, previously a farming community. Soon, family-owned workrooms and cottage industries emerged, supplying the main clock-making centres of Geneva. In 1848, the "École Royale d'Horlogerie" (Royal school of clockmaking) was created, and precision clock manufacturing in the Arve Valley soon became a mainstay of the town.

On 20 June 1844 all of the town's wooden chalet-style buildings were destroyed in a fire. The town was rebuilt with new architecture in the style of Turin, Italy (which was the capital of Sardinia-Savoy at the time). This style is still represented in Cluses today, making the city particularly noteworthy in the region Haute-Savoie.

== Economy and commerce ==
At the beginning of the 20th century, farming was still the most important commercial activity in Cluses, but eventually the watch and clock-making industries emerged as the dominant trade, and Cluses' reputation in the field soon attracted other precision manufacturing industries. For many years, Cluses served as the location of the factory and headquarters of the famous Mitchell Reel company, which in 1948 introduced the world's first modern spinning reel for sport fishing. In 1984, after building nearly 25 million fishing reels, low-cost labor competition from Asia forced the company to manufacture its products outside France. The company still exists, however, and its corporate headquarters are now located in the nearby community of Marignier, France.

Today, Cluses is a favorite tourist and winter sports destination. Watchmaking now accounts for only a small part of Cluses' industry, though the town continues to serve as a high-tech centre for precision engineering and design of advanced technical products. Somfy S.A., a manufacturer of controls and motors for awnings, roller shutters, window coverings, and projection screens, is the largest company still located in the city.

== Transport ==
The commune has a railway station, Cluses, on the La Roche-sur-Foron–Saint-Gervais-les-Bains-Le Fayet line. The nearest airport is Geneva Airport, which is located 60 km (37 mi) north west of Cluses.

== Culture ==
- The Faucigny Music Festival, held to commemorate François Curt, founder of the Music Federation of Faucigny, takes place among the 14 towns of the Arve Valley on the last Sunday of every June. Each year, a different town hosts the festival: Cluses last hosted the event in June 2000.
- Each year, Cluses also holds a modern folk rock and rock music festival called "Musiques en Stock", a free event with many well-known artists and performers.

== Monuments ==
- The "Pont Vieux" is an historic bridge on the Arve. It was the only bridge over the river for many centuries.
- The National School of Clockmaking, a historic monument, is now a secondary school (Lycée Charles Poncet)

== Districts ==
Sardagne, Centre-ville (downtown), Messy, the Ewües I and II, the Noiret, Marzan, Ponthior, Curzeilles, St Vincent, and Saint Nicolas.

== Twin towns – sister cities ==
Cluses is twinned with:

- Beaverton, United States
- Trossingen, Germany

== See also ==
- Communes of the Haute-Savoie department
