= Château =

French term for a manor house or palace

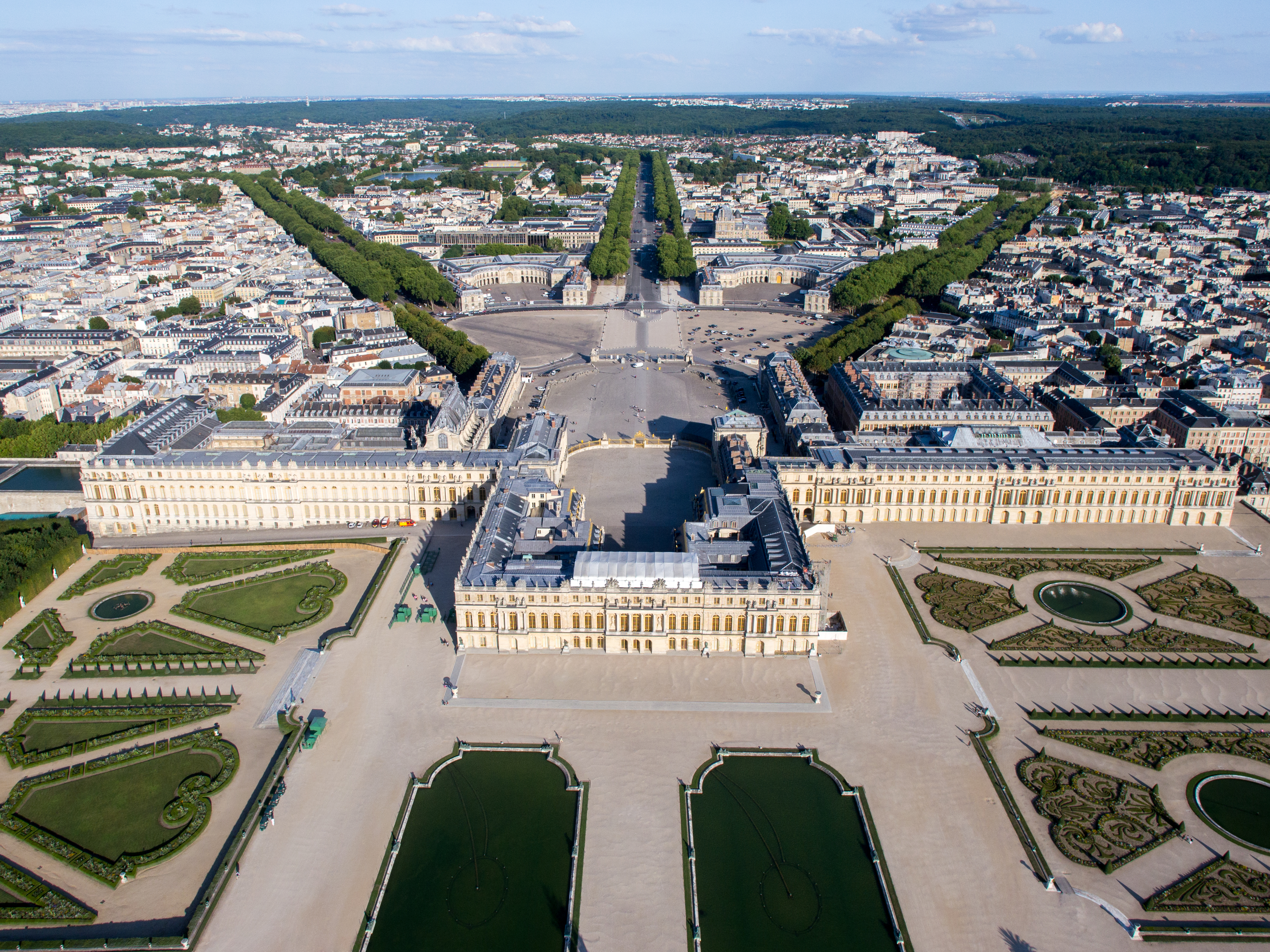
The Château de Versailles outside Paris, France's best-known château and a UNESCO World Heritage Site.

A château (plural châteaux, both pronounced [ʃɑto]) is a manor house, or palace, or residence of the lord of the manor, or a fine country house of nobility or gentry, with or without fortifications, originally, and still most frequently, in French-speaking regions.

Nowadays, a château may be any stately residence built in a French style; the term is additionally often used for a winegrower's estate, especially in the Bordeaux region of France.

== Definition ==
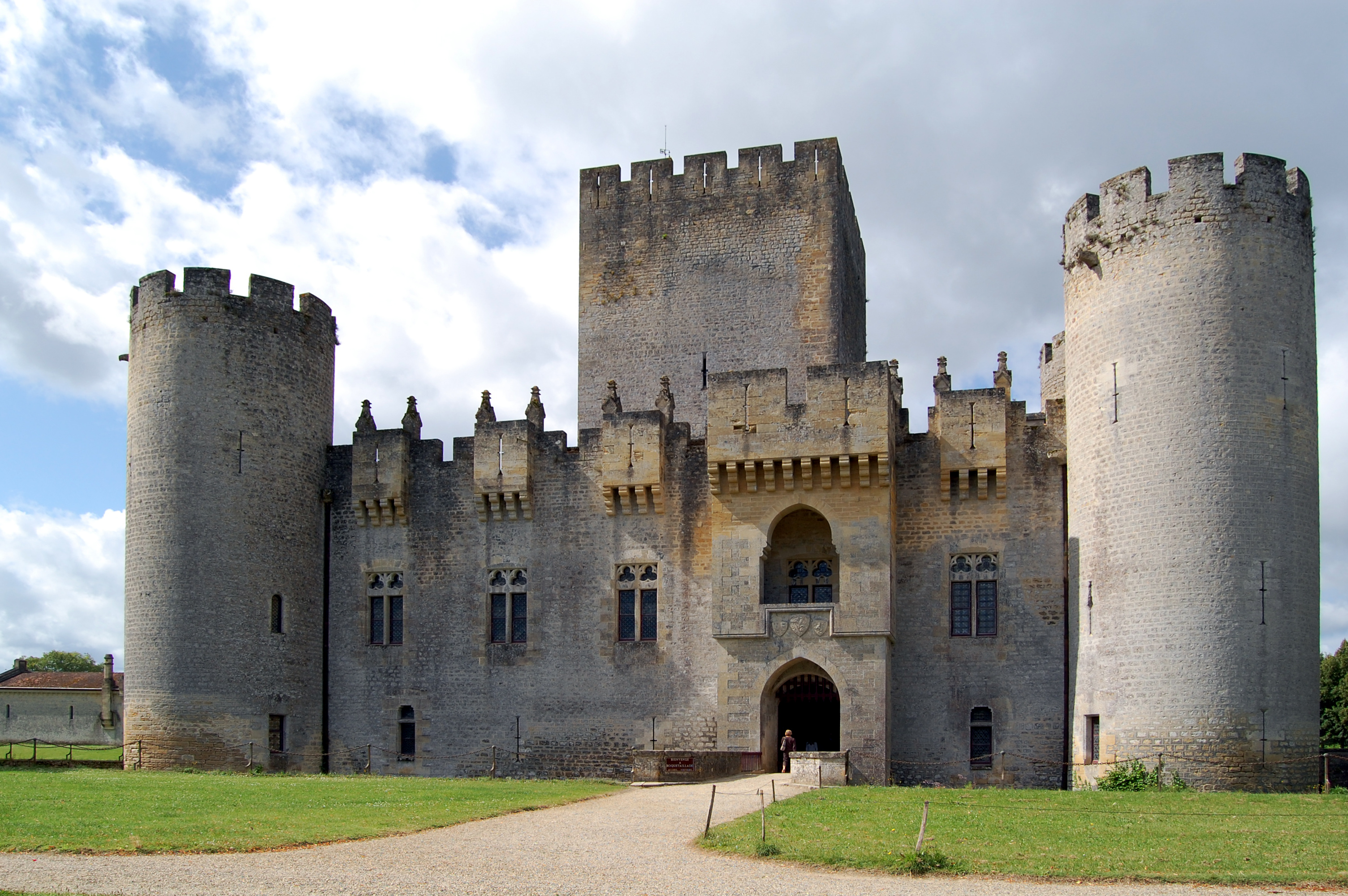
Château fort de Roquetaillade

The word "château" is a French word that has entered English, where its meaning is more specific than in French. The French word château denotes buildings as diverse as a medieval fortress, a Renaissance palace, and a fine 19th-century country house. Care should therefore be taken when translating the French word château into English, noting the nature of the building in question. Most French châteaux are "palaces" or fine "country houses" rather than "castles", and for these, the word "château" is appropriate in English. Sometimes the word "palace" is more suitable. To give an outstanding example, the Château de Versailles, also called in French le palais de Versailles, is so-called because it was located in the countryside when it was built. Still, it does not resemble a castle, so it is usually known in English as the Palace of Versailles. When clarification is needed in French, the term château fort is used to describe a fortified castle, such as the Château fort de Roquetaillade.

The urban counterpart of a château is a palais in French, which is usually applied only to very grand residences in a city. This usage differs from that of the term "palace" in English, where there is no requirement that a palace be in a city, whereas the word palais is rarely used for buildings other than the grandest royal residences. The term hôtel particulier is used in French for an urban "private house" of a grand sort.

== Concept ==
A château is a "power house", as Sir John Summerson dubbed the British and Irish "stately homes" that are the British Isles' architectural counterparts to French châteaux. It is the personal (and usually hereditary) badge of a family that, with some official rank, locally represents the royal authority; thus, the word château often refers to the dwelling of a member of either the French nobility or royalty. However, some fine châteaux, such as Vaux-le-Vicomte, were built by the essentially high-bourgeois—people but recently ennobled: tax-farmers and ministers of Louis XIII and his royal successors. The quality of the residences could vary considerably, from grand châteaux owned by royalty and the wealthy elite near larger towns to run-down châteaux vacated by poor nobility and officials in the countryside, isolated and vulnerable.

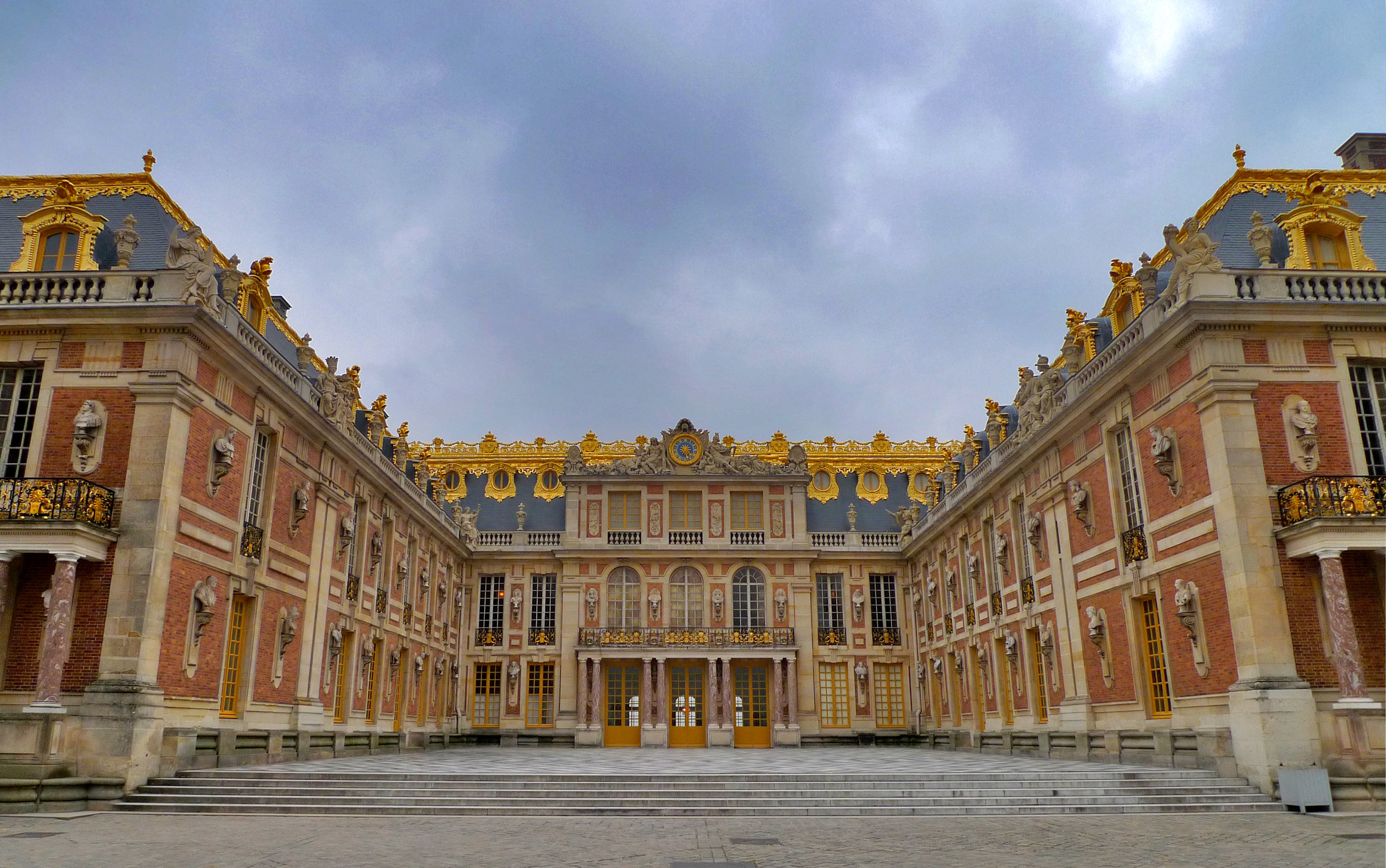
Cour d'honneur by Louis Le Vau at Château de Versailles, subsequently copied all over Europe

A château was historically supported by its terres (lands), composing a demesne that rendered the society of the château largely self-sufficient, in the manner of the historic Roman and early medieval villa system (cf. manorialism, hacienda). The open villas of Rome in the times of Pliny the Elder, Maecenas, and Emperor Tiberius began to be walled-in, and then fortified in the 3rd century AD, thus evolving to castellar "châteaux". In modern usage, a château retains some enclosures that are distant descendants of these fortifying outworks: a fenced, gated, closeable forecourt, perhaps a gatehouse or a keeper's lodge, and supporting outbuildings (stables, kitchens, breweries, bakeries, manservant quarters in the garçonnière). Besides the cour d'honneur (court of honour) entrance, the château might have an inner cour ("court"), and inside, in the private residence, the château faces a simply and discreetly enclosed park.

In the city of Paris, the Louvre (originally a fortified castle) and the Luxembourg Palace (originally a suburban palace) were initially referred to as châteaux, but became "palaces" when the city enclosed them. In other French-speaking regions of Europe, such as Wallonia (Belgium), the word château is used with the same meaning as in France. In Belgium, a strong French architectural influence is evident in the seventeenth-century Château des Comtes de Marchin and the eighteenth-century Château de Seneffe.

In the United States, the word château took root selectively. In the Gilded Age resort town of Newport, Rhode Island, large manor homes were called "cottages", but north of Wilmington, Delaware, in the rich, rural "Château Country" centred upon the powerful Du Pont family, the word château is used with its original definition. In Canada, especially in English, château usually denotes a hotel, not a house, and applies only to the country's most elaborate railway hotels, built during the Canadian railroad golden age, such as the Château Lake Louise in Lake Louise, Alberta, the Château Laurier in Ottawa, the Château Montebello in Montebello, Quebec, and the Château Frontenac in Quebec City.

== French châteaux—particular regions ==
=== Bordeaux region ===
There are many estates with true châteaux on them in the Bordeaux wine regions. Still, it is customary for any wine-producing estate since the 19th century, no matter how humble, to prefix its name with "Château". This term became the default way of designating an estate in Bordeaux, in the same way that Domaine did in Burgundy. Both Château and Domaine are aristocratic in implication, but Bordeaux had a better claim to the association: nobles had owned Bordeaux's best vineyards for centuries. Most of Burgundy's best vineyards, in contrast, had been owned by the Church. The term Château became a permanent verbal fixture in Bordeaux, and it was emulated in other French regions and outside France.

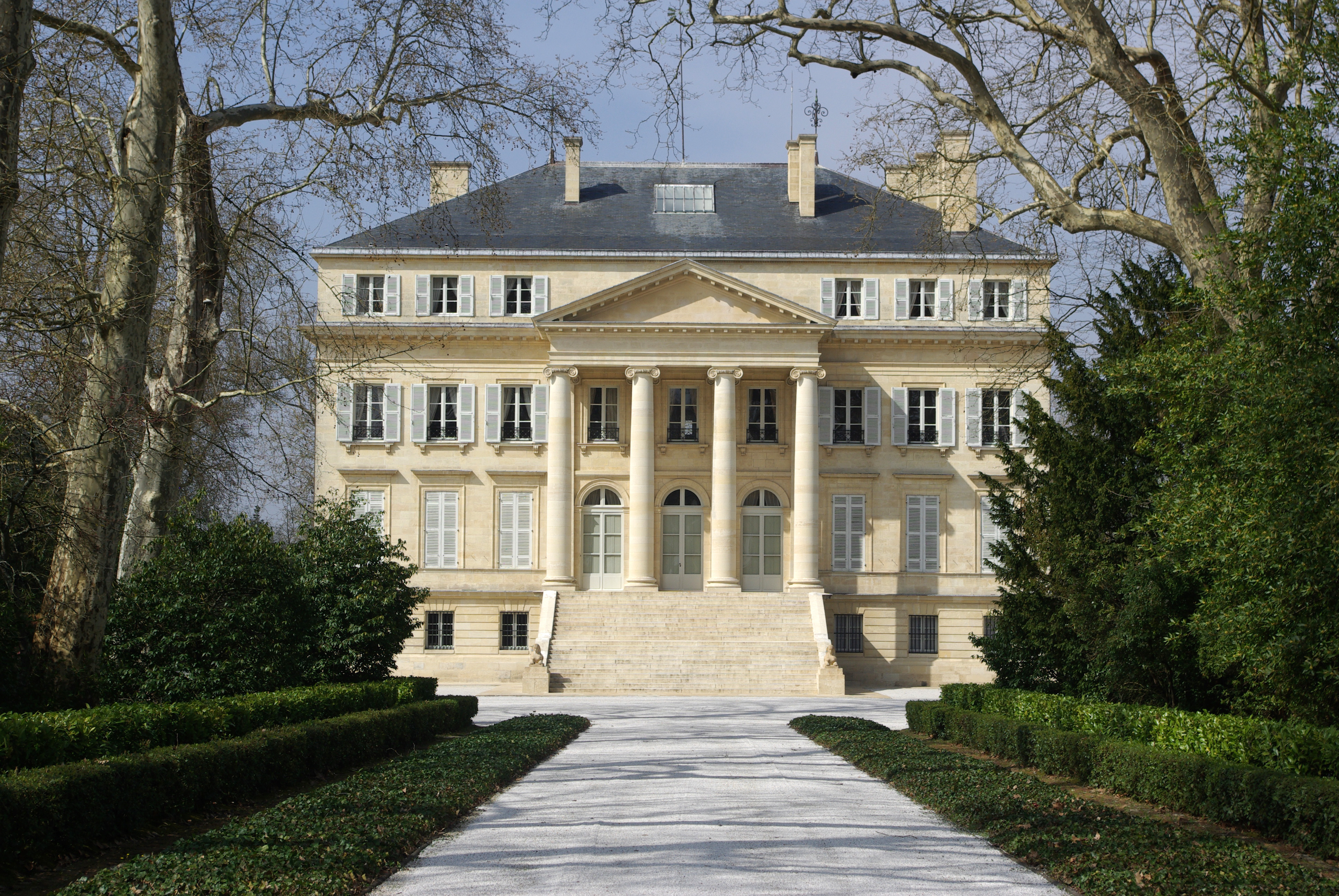
Château Margaux

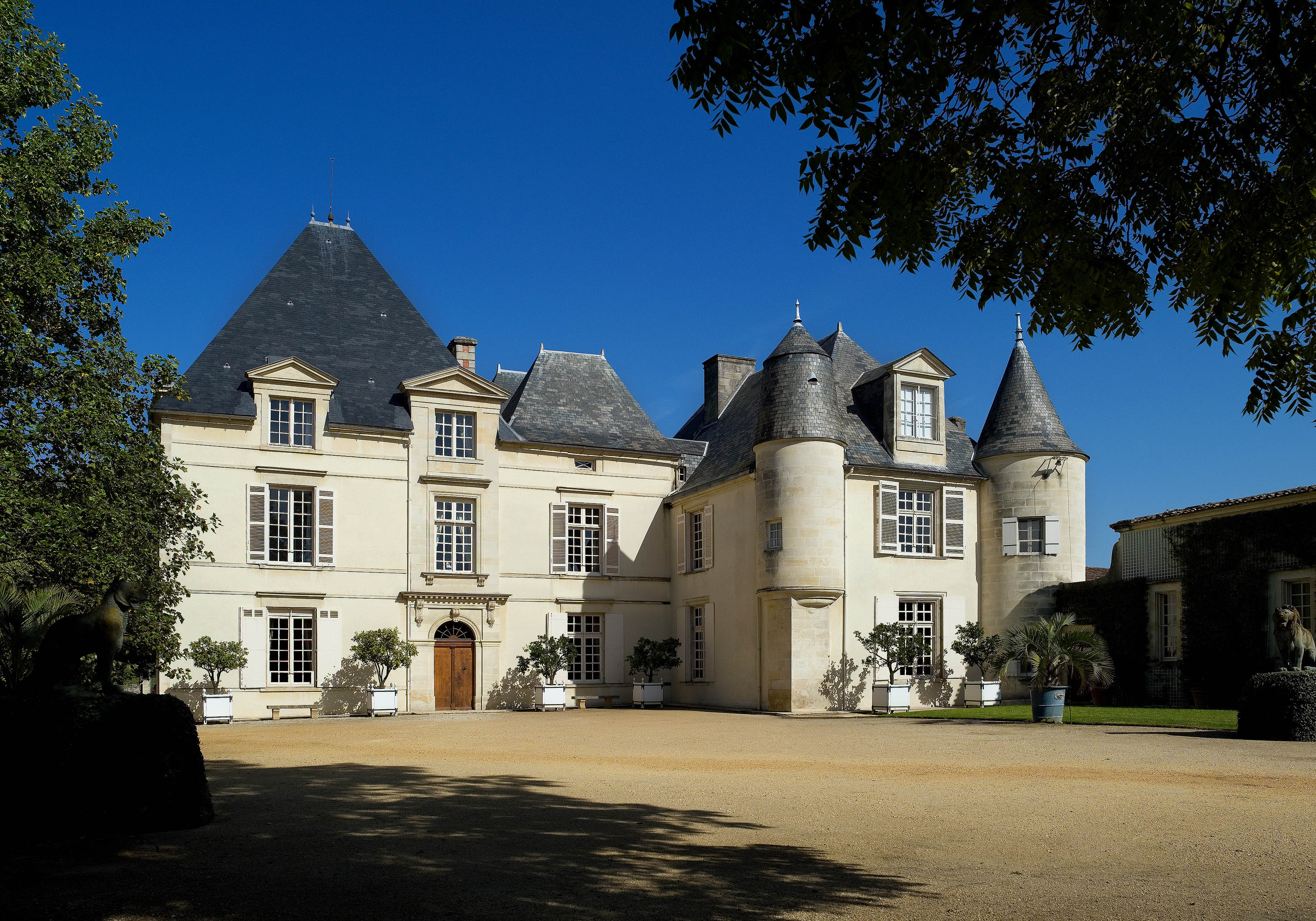
Château Haut-Brion

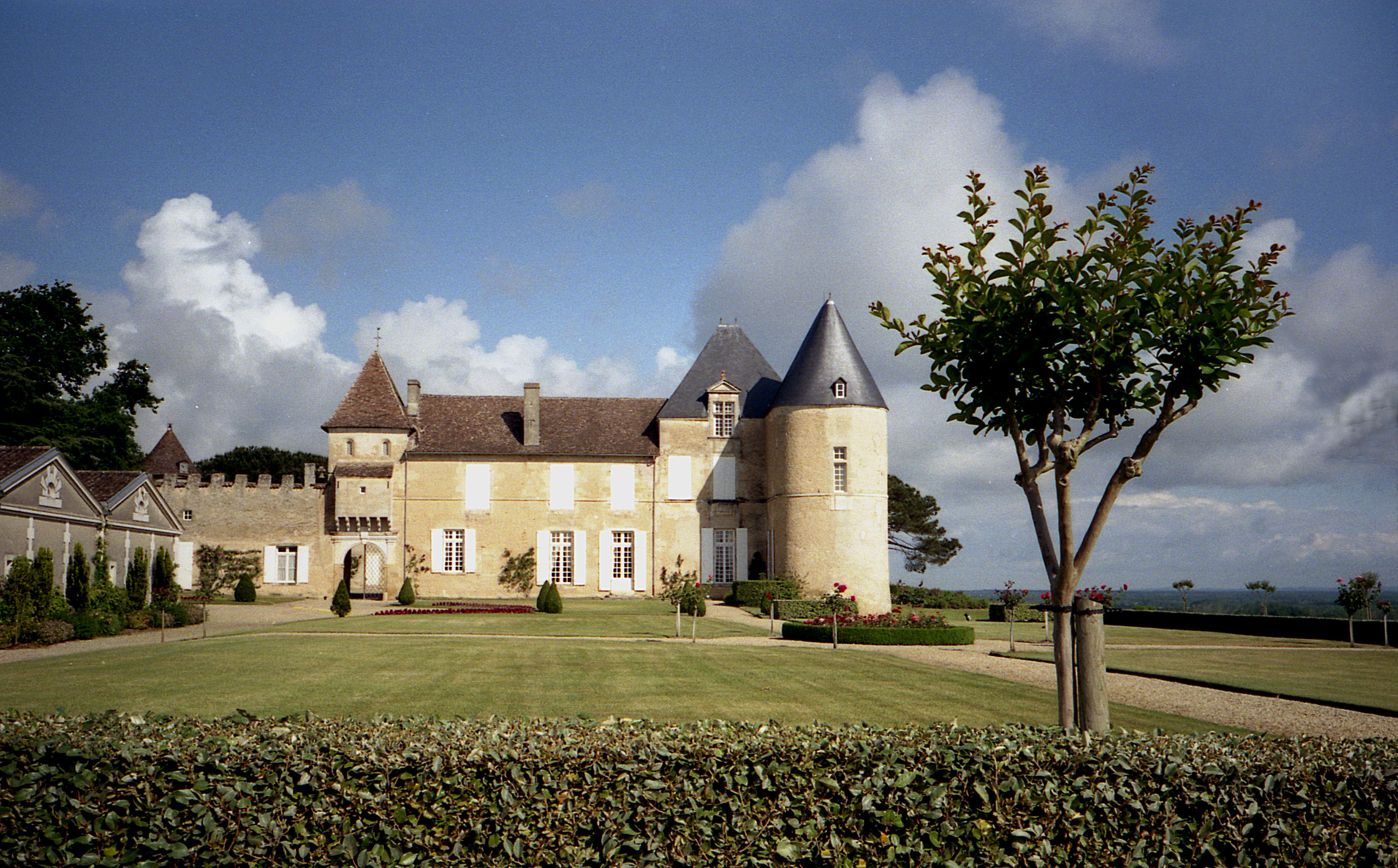
Château d'Yquem

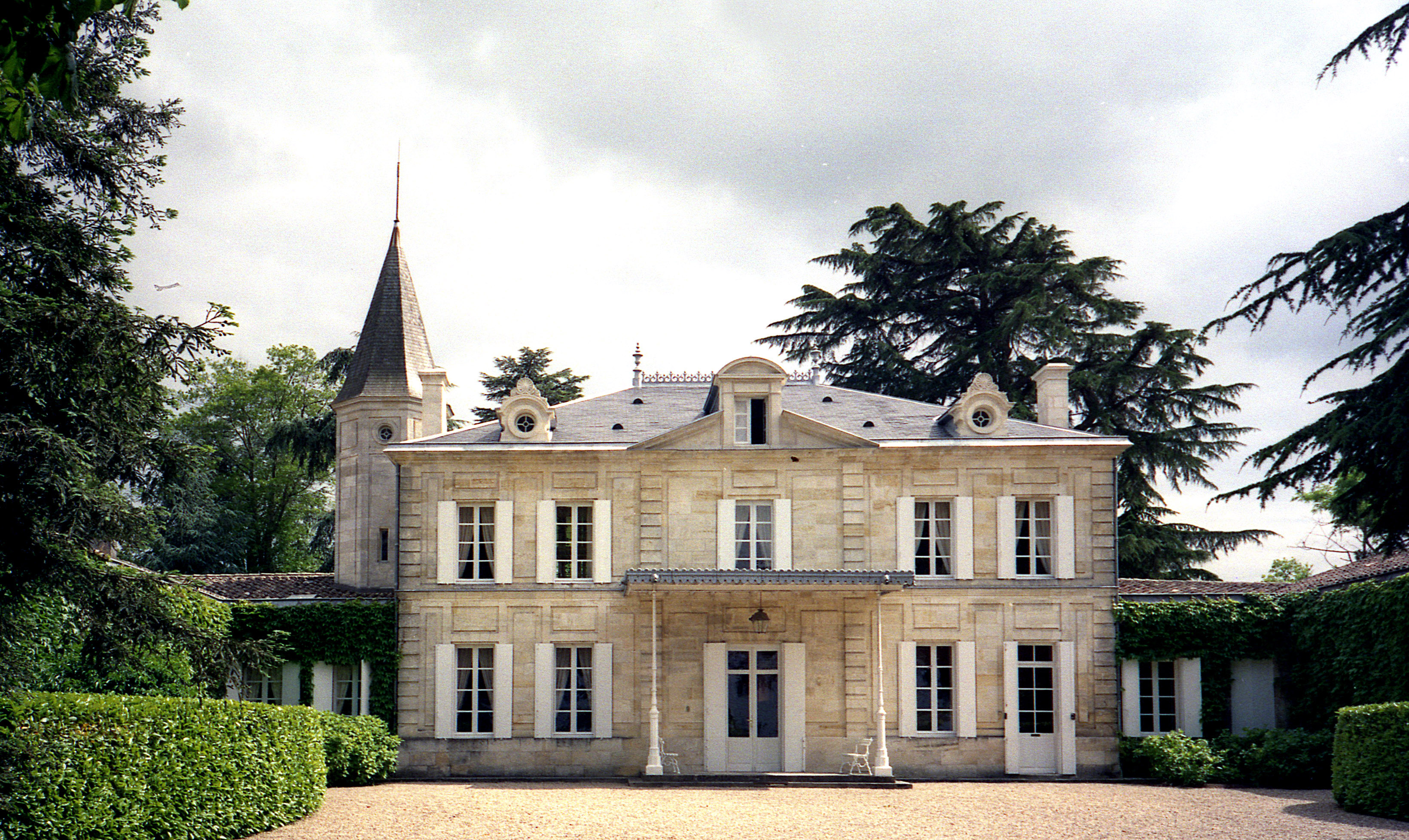
Château Cheval-Blanc

The winery denomination Château is now protected by French law, and confirmed in 1981 by European Union law, as "traditional appellation". The term Château may be used only if two conditions are fulfilled:

- The wine concerned has to be made exclusively from grapes harvested from the vineyard,
- The wine-making process was carried out there.

=== Loire Valley ===
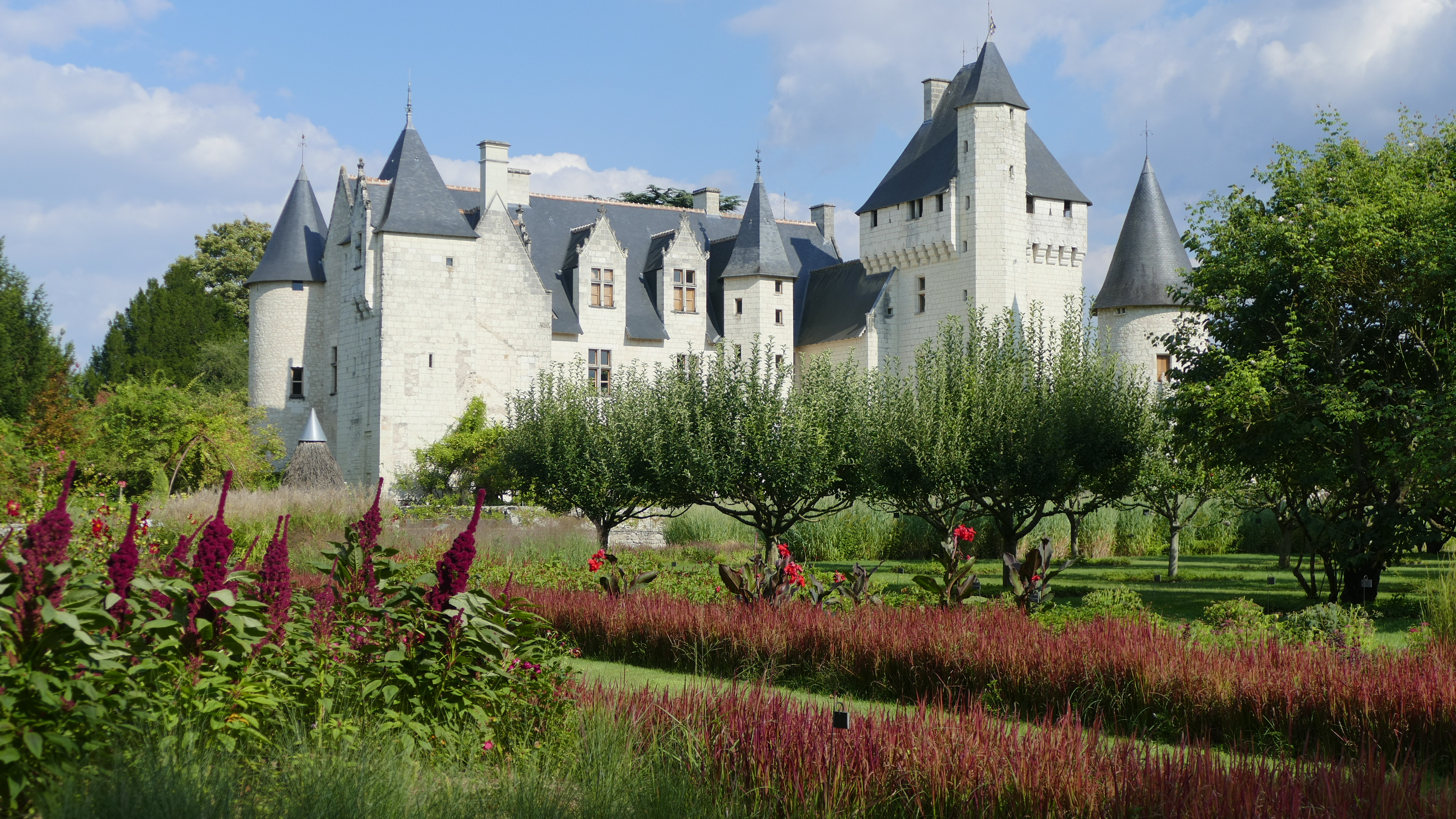
Château du Rivau

The Loire Valley (Vallée de la Loire) is home to more than 300 châteaux. They were built between the 10th and 20th centuries, firstly by the French kings followed soon thereafter by the nobility; hence, the Valley is termed "The Valley of the Kings". Alternatively, due to its moderate climate, wine-growing soils, and rich agricultural land, the Loire Valley is referred to as "The Garden of France". The châteaux range from the very large (often now in public hands) to more 'human-scale' châteaux such as the Château de Beaulieu in Saumur or the medieval Château du Rivau close to Chinon, which were built of the local tuffeau stone.

== French châteaux—selected examples ==
=== Château de Chenonceau ===
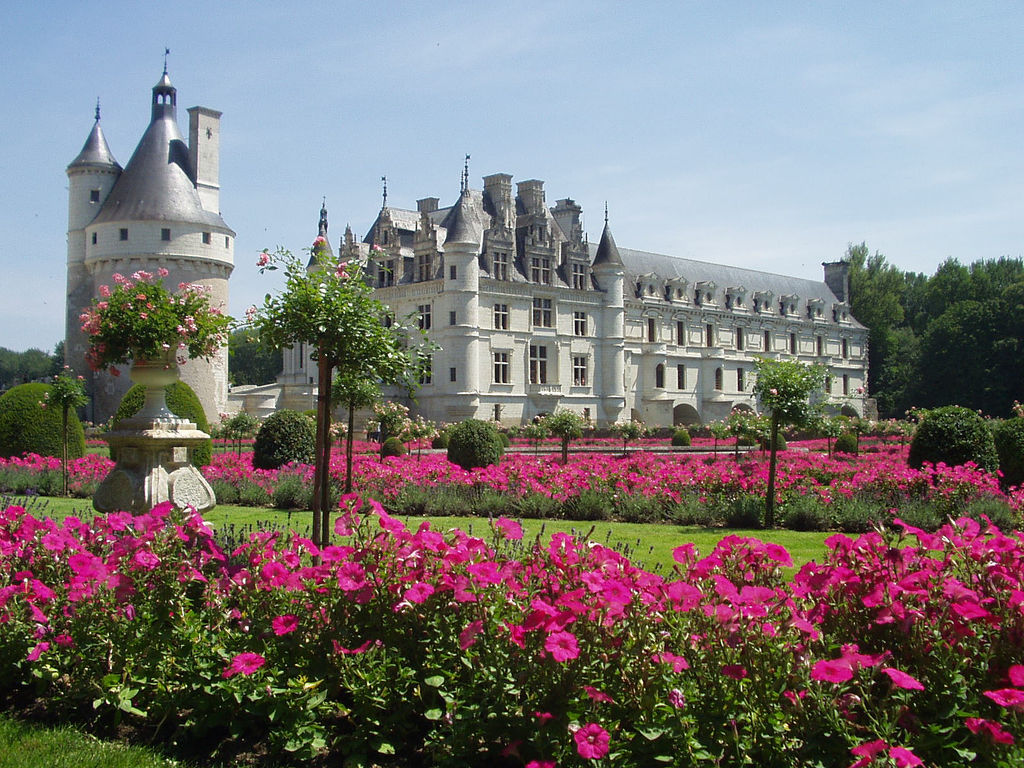
Château de Chenonceau

The Château de Chenonceau is a French château spanning the river Cher, near the small village of Chenonceaux in the Indre-et-Loire department of the Loire Valley in France. It is one of the best-known châteaux of the Loire Valley. The estate of Chenonceau is first mentioned in writing in the 11th century. The current château was built in 1514–1522 on the foundations of an old mill and was later extended to span the river. The bridge over the river was built from 1556 to 1559 to designs by the French Renaissance architect Philibert de l'Orme, and the gallery on the bridge, built from 1570 to 1576 to designs by Jean Bullant.

=== Château de Dampierre-en-Yvelines ===
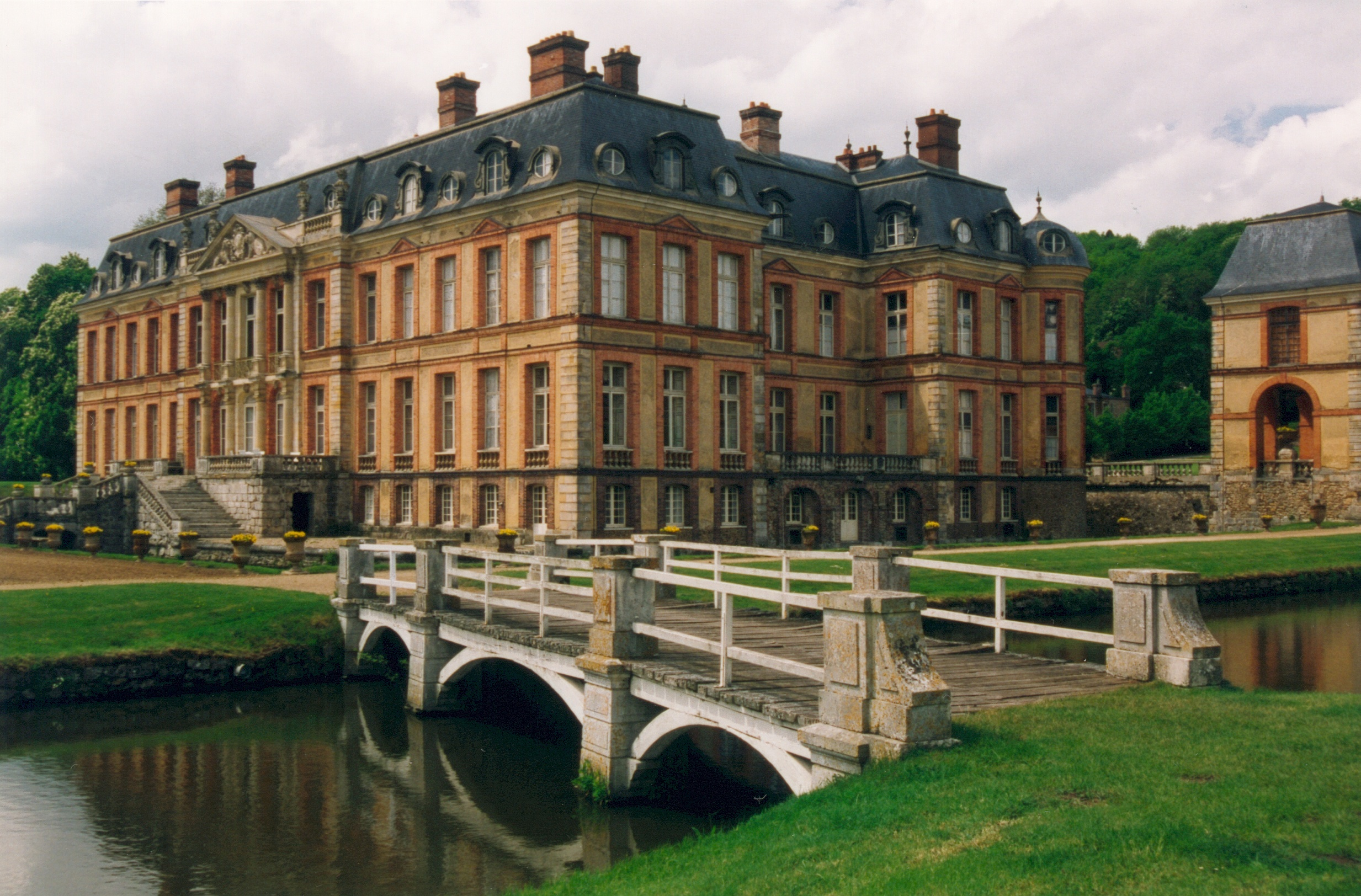
Château de Dampierre

Built by Jules Hardouin-Mansart, 1675–1683 for the duc de Chevreuse, Colbert's son-in-law, the Château de Dampierre is a French Baroque château of manageable size. Protected behind fine wrought iron double gates, the main block and its outbuildings (corps de logis), linked by balustrades, are ranged symmetrically around a dry paved and gravelled cour d'honneur. Behind, the central axis is extended between the former parterres, now mown hay. The park with formally shaped water was laid out by André Le Notre.

=== Château de Montsoreau ===
The Château de Montsoreau is the only Château of the Loire Valley to have been built directly in the Loire riverbed. It is also one of the first example of a renaissance architecture in France. Montsoreau was built in 1453 by Jean II de Chambes (first counsellor of Charles VII of France and ambassador of France to Venice and to Turkey) by order of the king soon after the end of the Hundred years war. The French dramatist Alexandre Dumas made the château de Montsoreau world famous with his trilogy on the French Wars of Religion of which the lady of Monsoreau is the second volume.

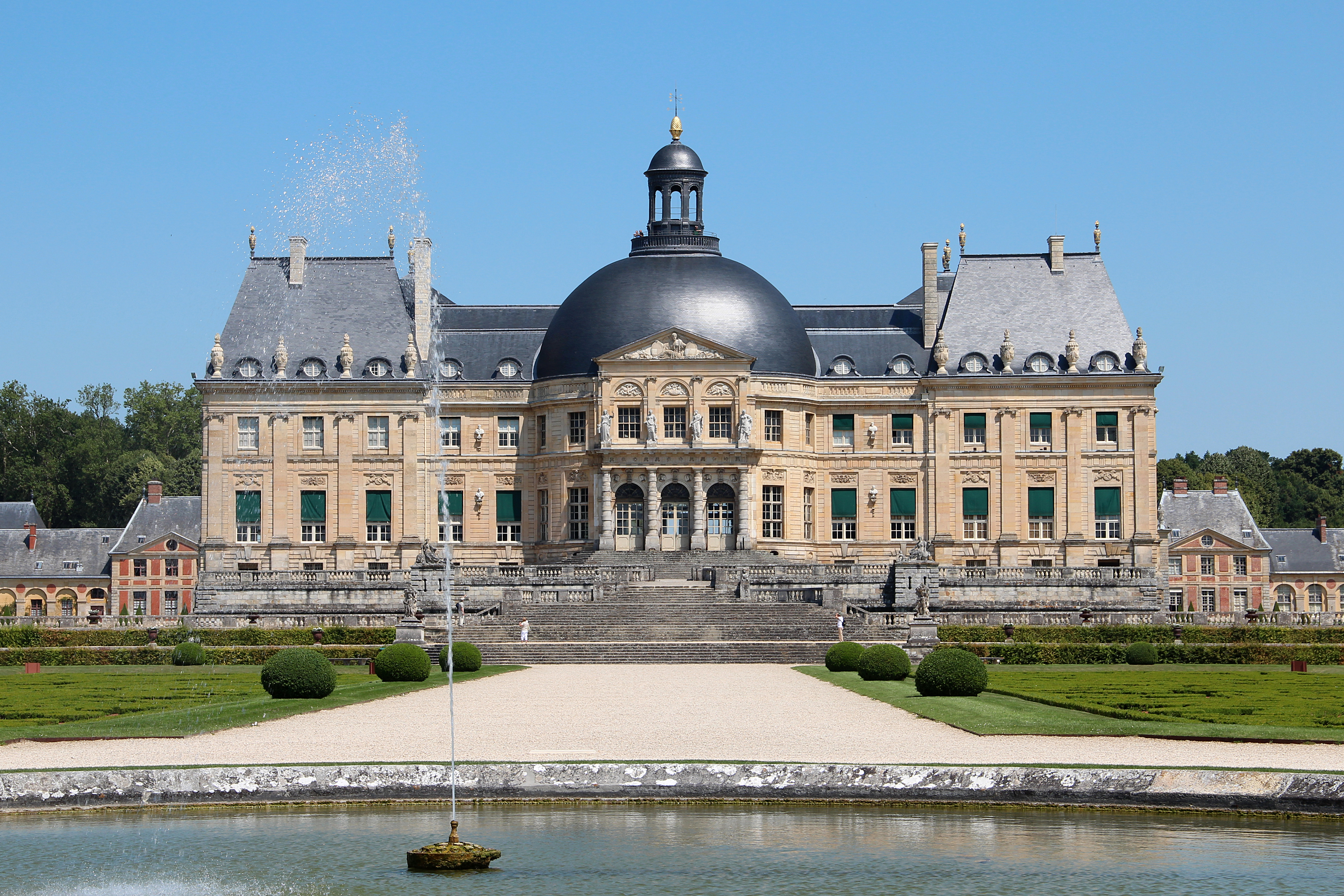
Château de Vaux-le-Vicomte

=== Château de Vaux-le-Vicomte ===
The Château de Vaux-le-Vicomte is a baroque French château located in Maincy, near Melun, 55 km southeast of Paris in the Seine-et-Marne département of France. It was built by Louis Le Vau from 1658 to 1661 for Nicolas Fouquet, Marquis de Belle-Isle (Belle-Île-en-Mer), Viscount of Melun and Vaux, the superintendent of finances of Louis XIV. The interior was lavishly decorated by painter Charles Le Brun. Louis XIV later called Louis Le Vau as well as Charles Le Brun to work at Versailles.

=== Château de Versailles ===
The Palace of Versailles, or in French Château de Versailles, is a royal château in Versailles, in the Île-de-France region of France. When the château was built, Versailles was a country village; today, however, it is a wealthy suburb of Paris, some 20 kilometres (12 miles) southwest of the French capital. The court of Versailles was the centre of political power in France from 1682, when Louis XIV moved from Paris, until the royal family was forced to return to the capital in October 1789 after the beginning of the French Revolution. Versailles is therefore famous not only as a building but also as a symbol of the absolute monarchy of the Ancien Régime.

== Gallery ==
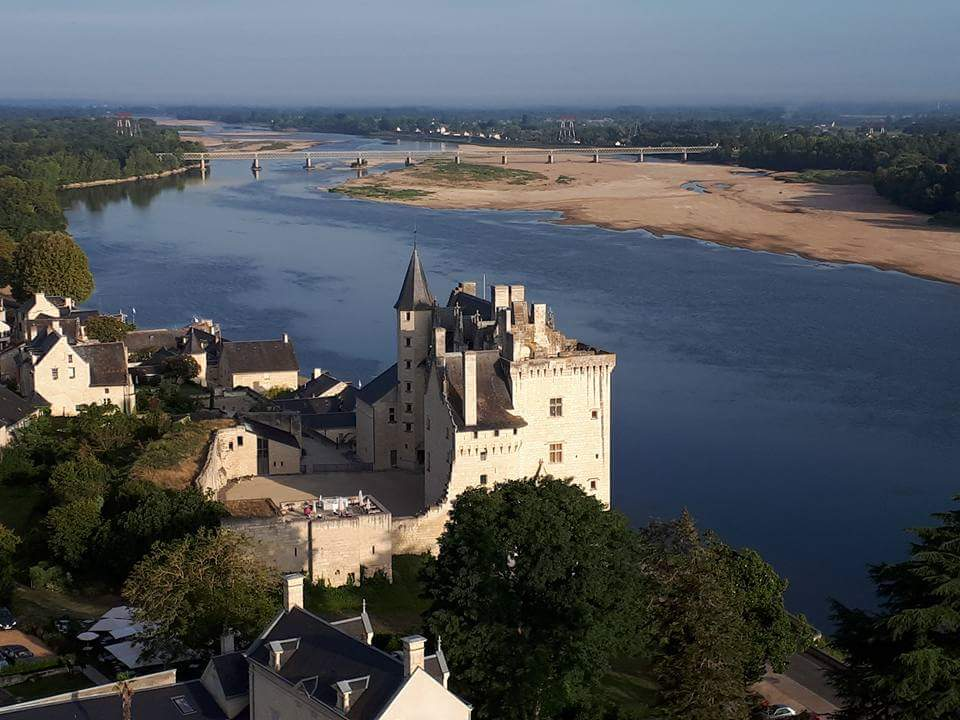
Château de Montsoreau

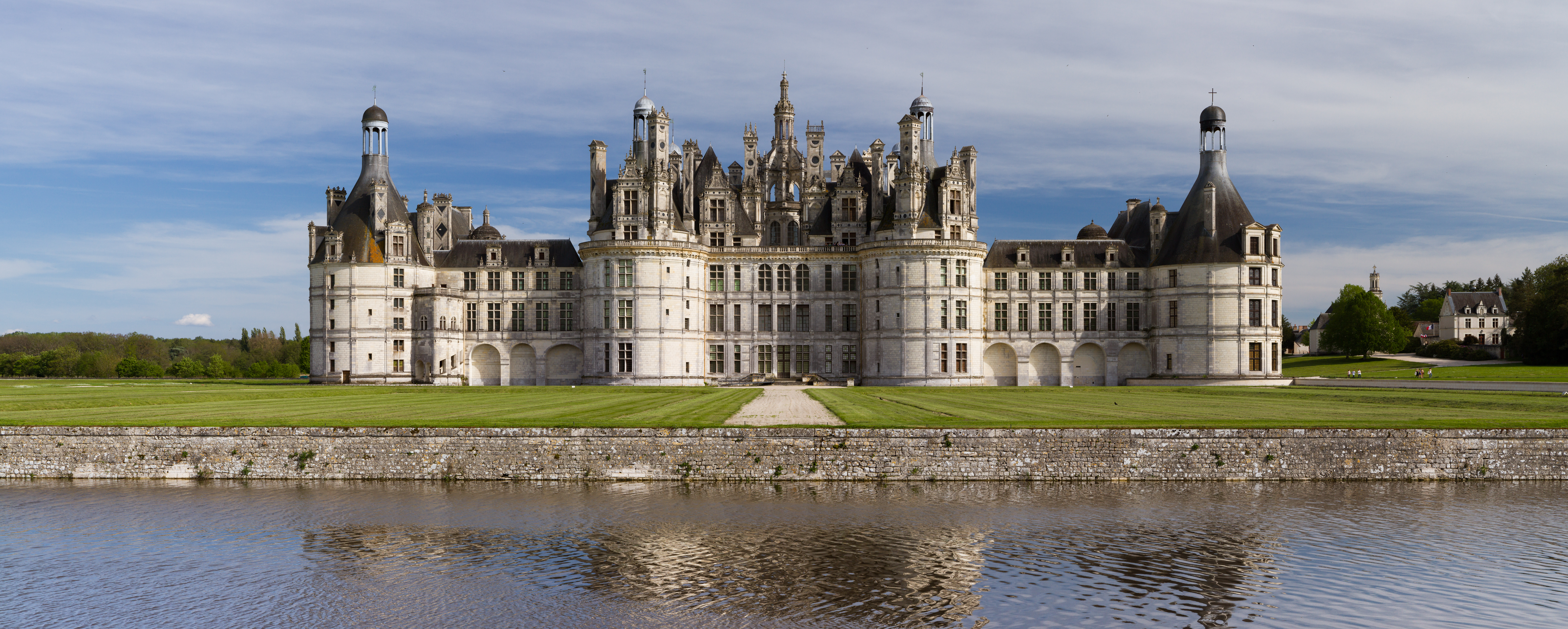
Château de Chambord

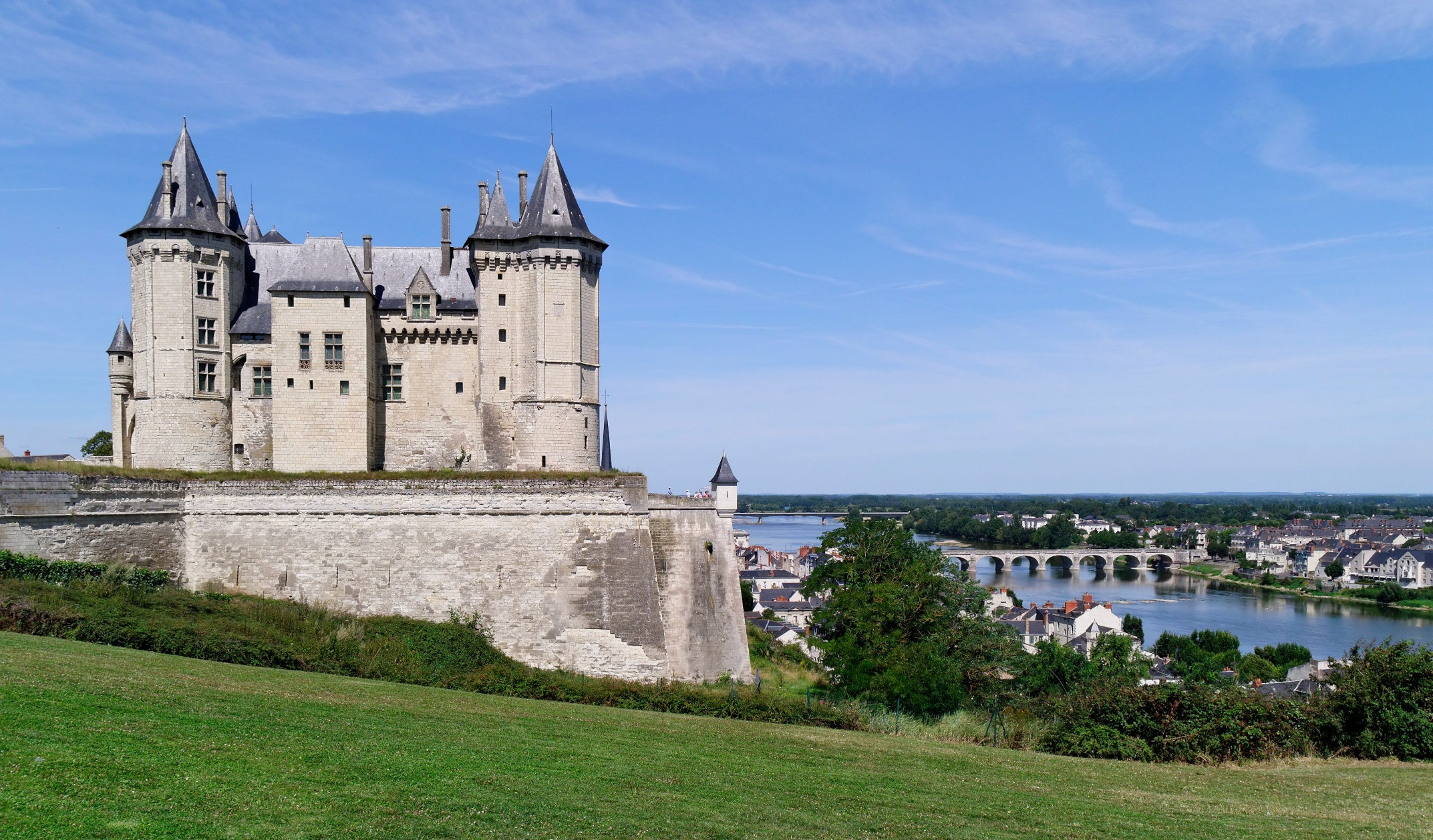
Château de Saumur

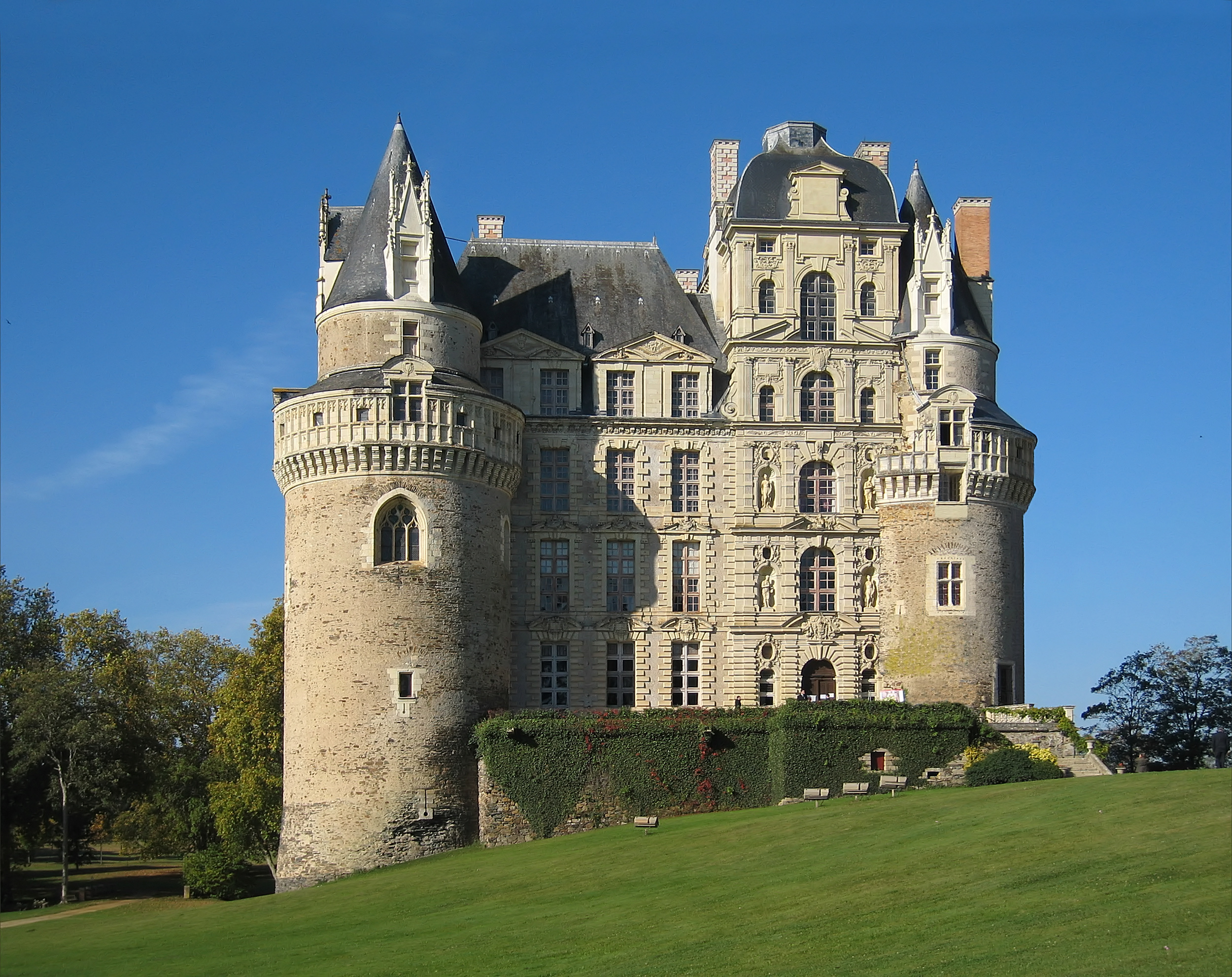
Château de Brissac

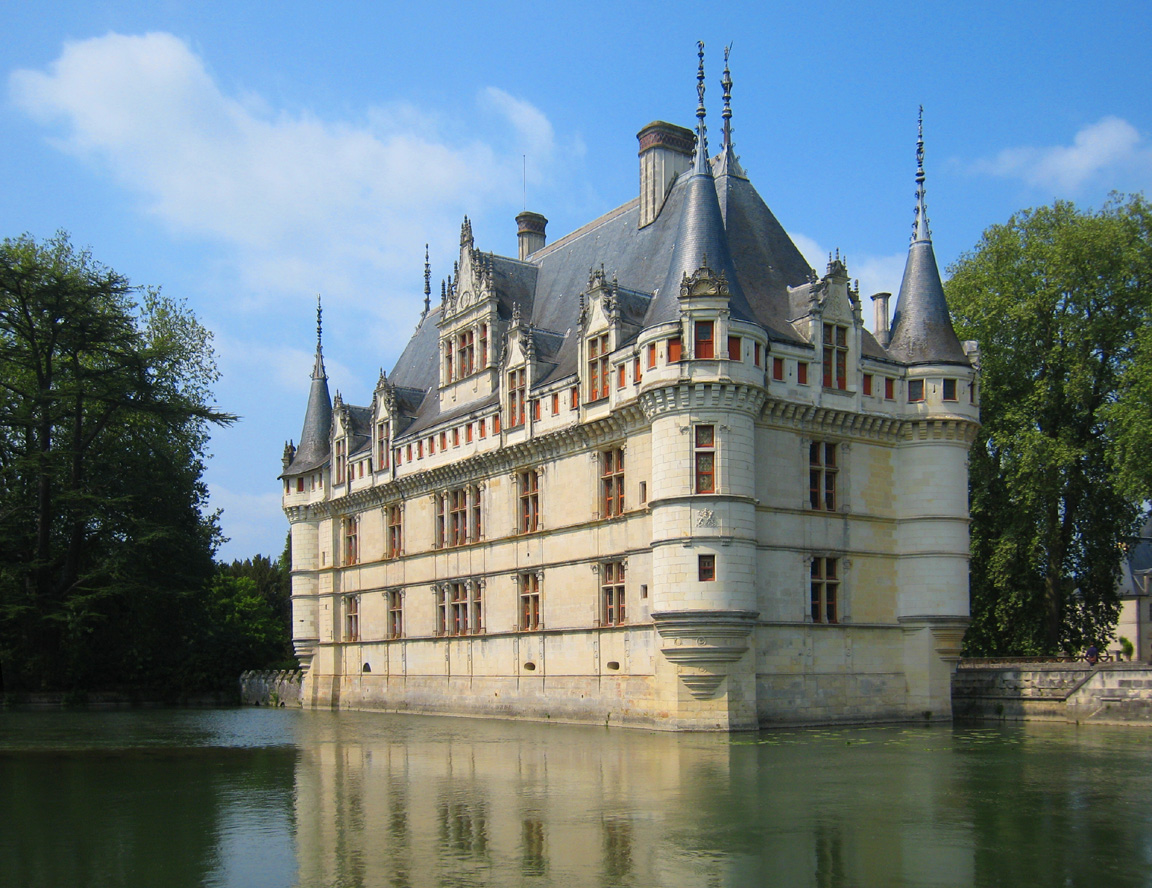
Château d'Azay-le-Rideau

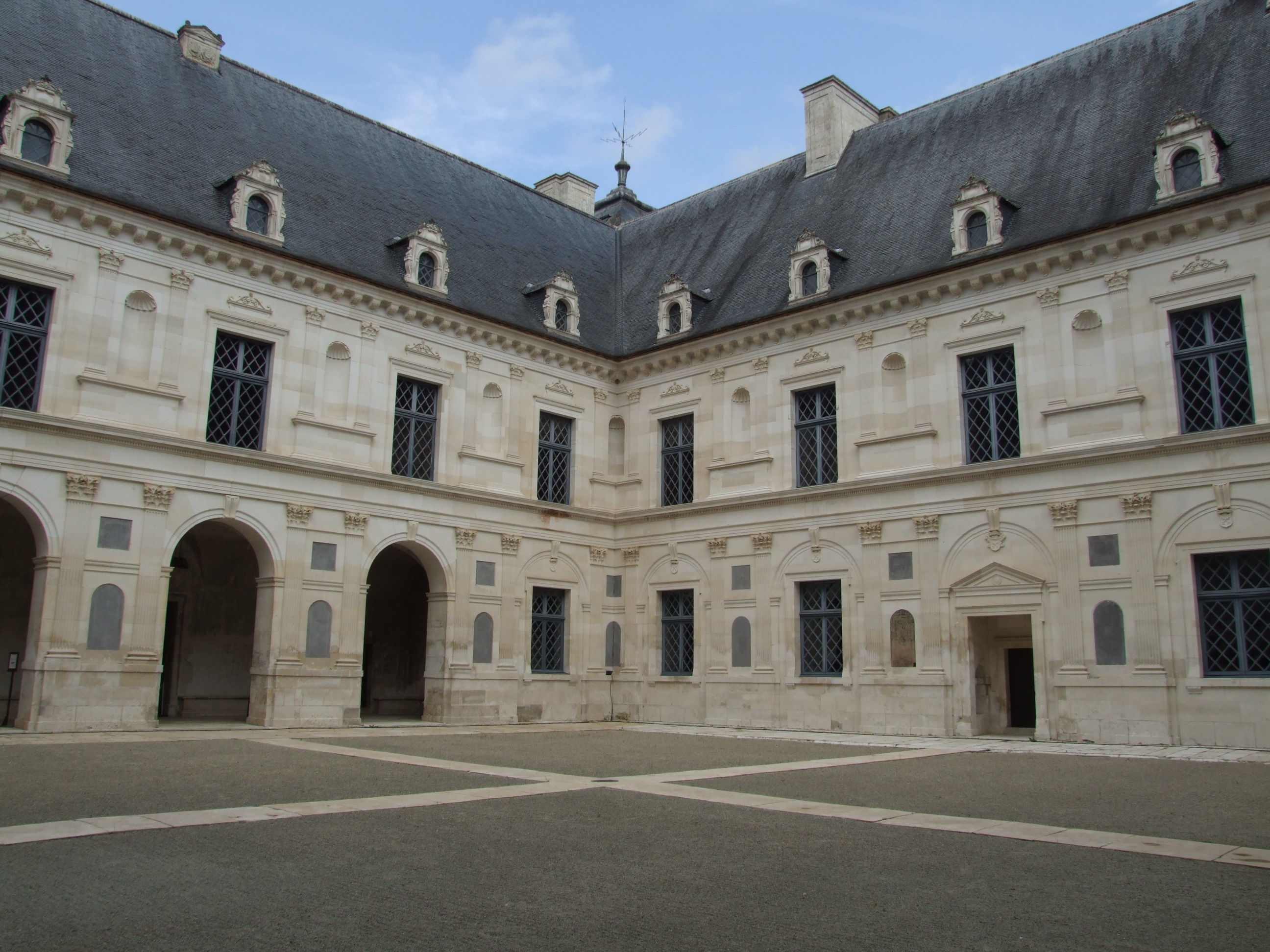
Château d'Ancy-le-Franc

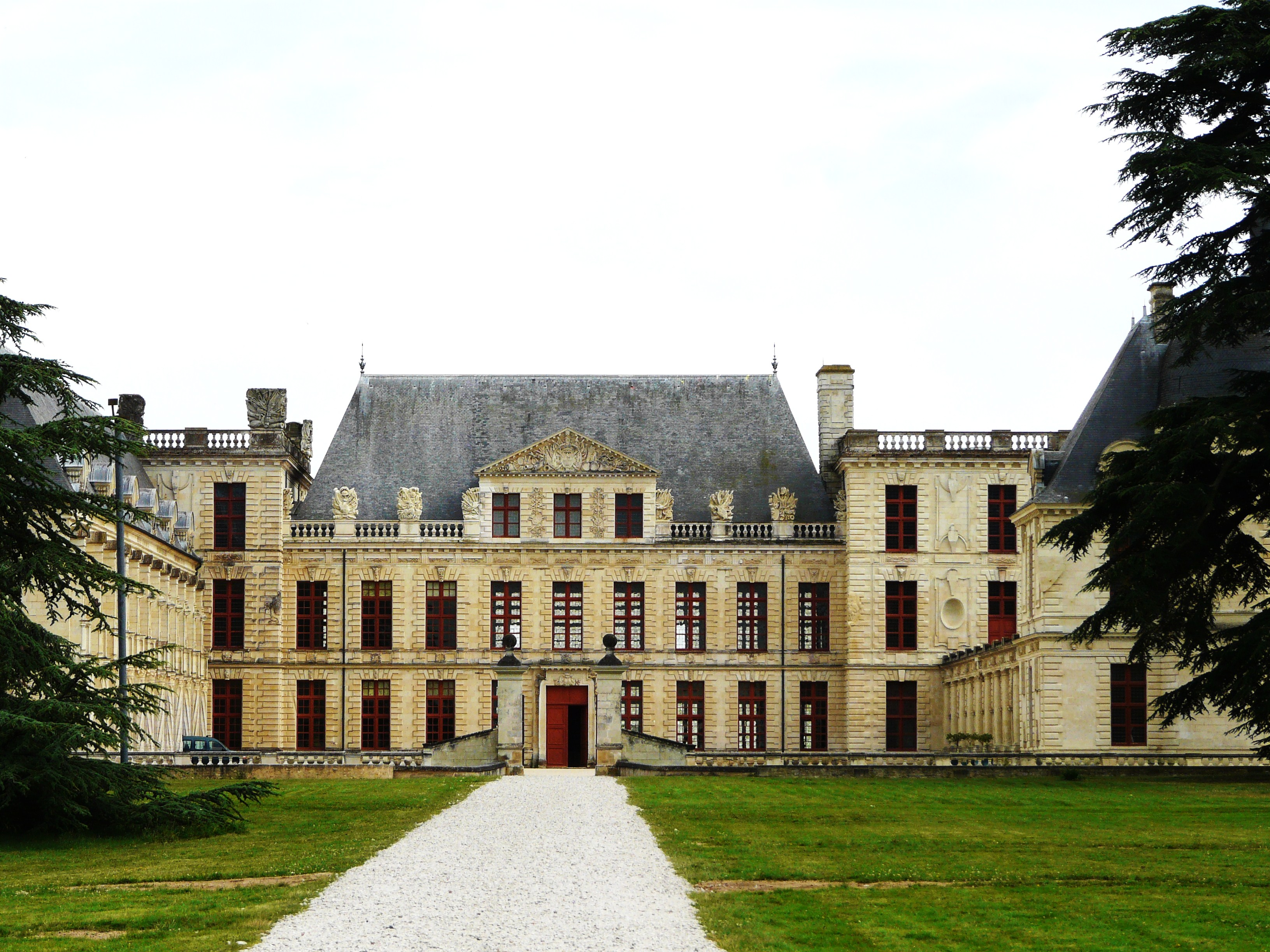
Château d'Oiron

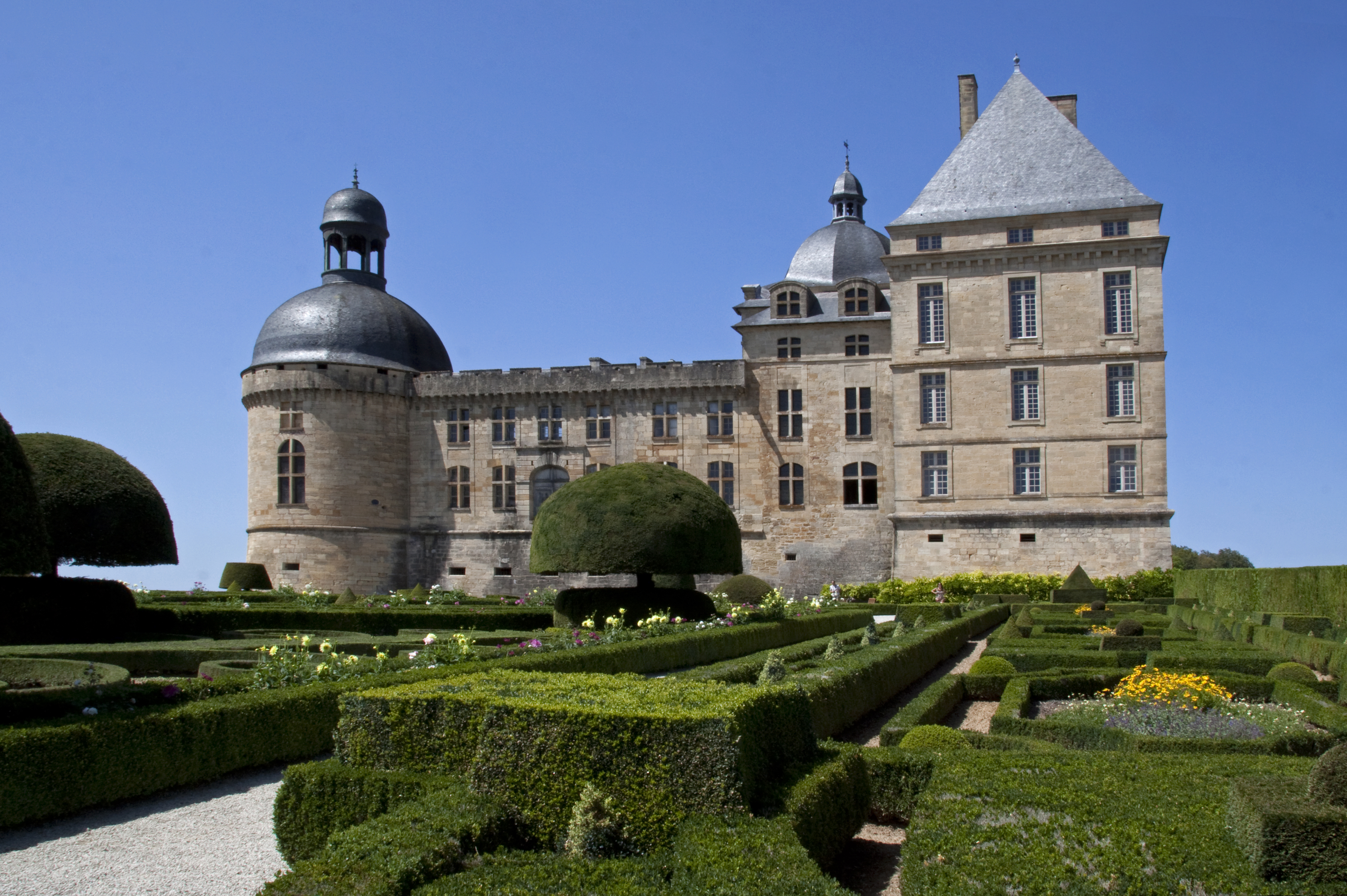
Château de Hautefort

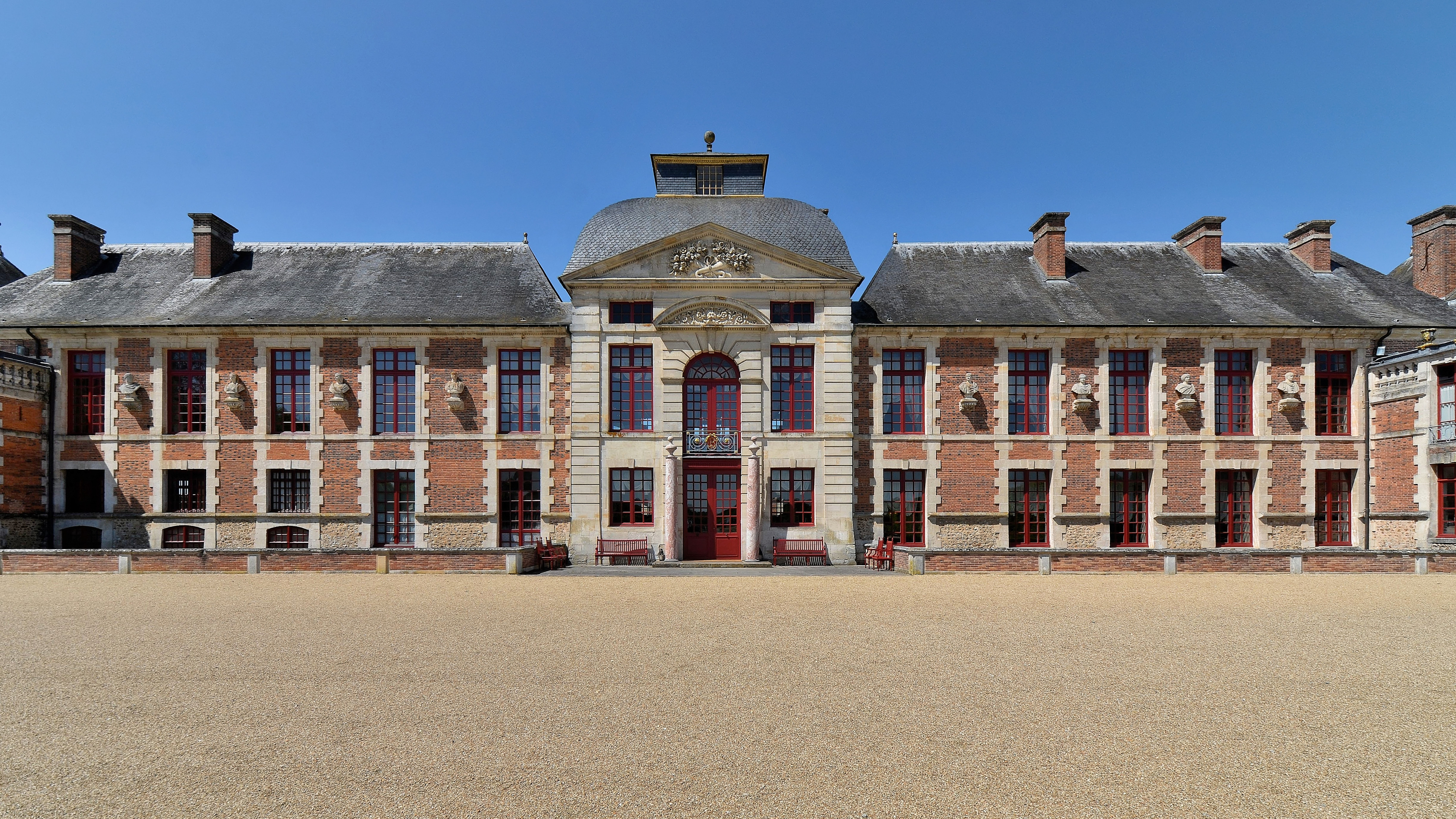
Château du Champ-de-Bataille

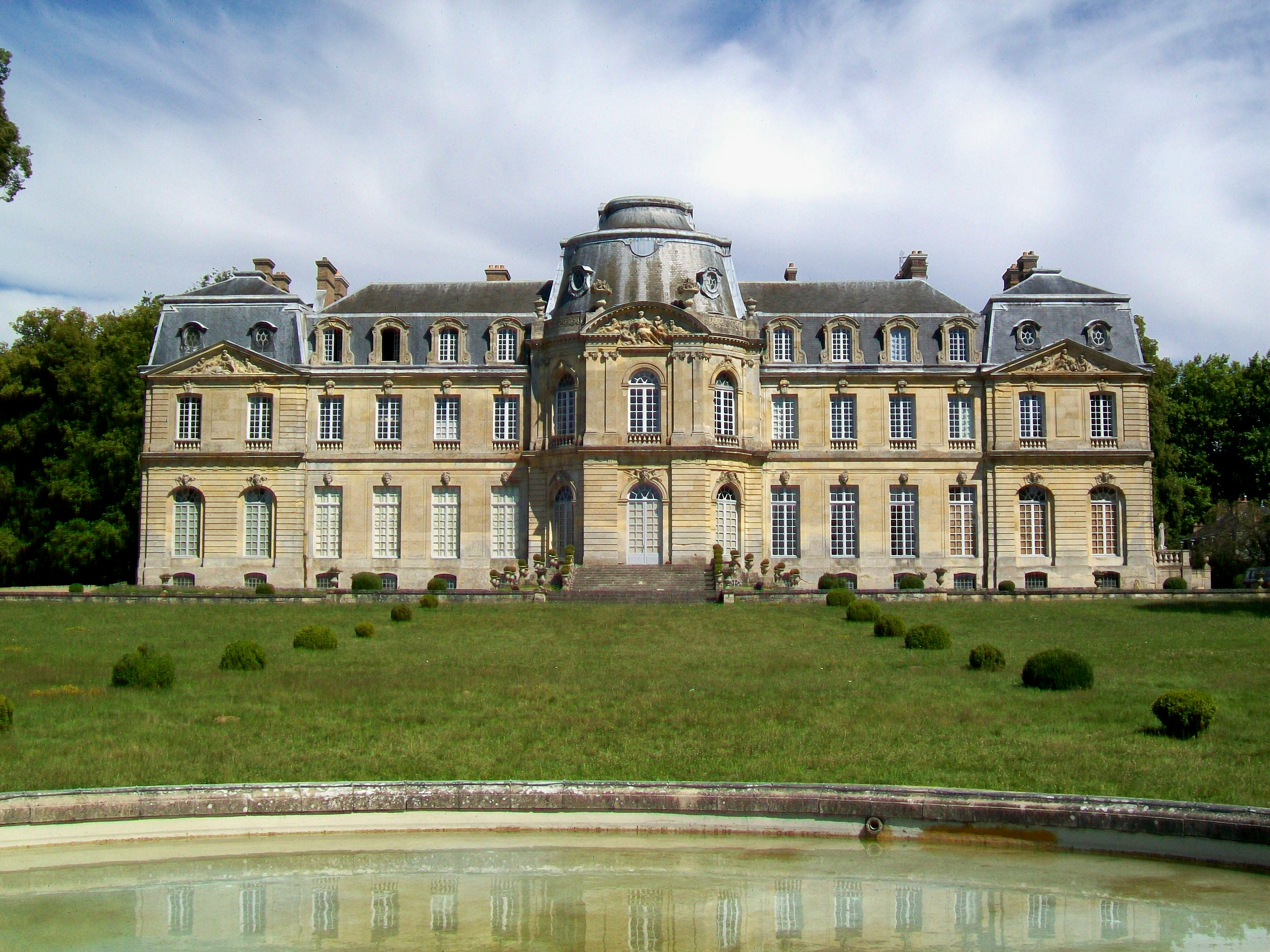
Château de Champlâtreux

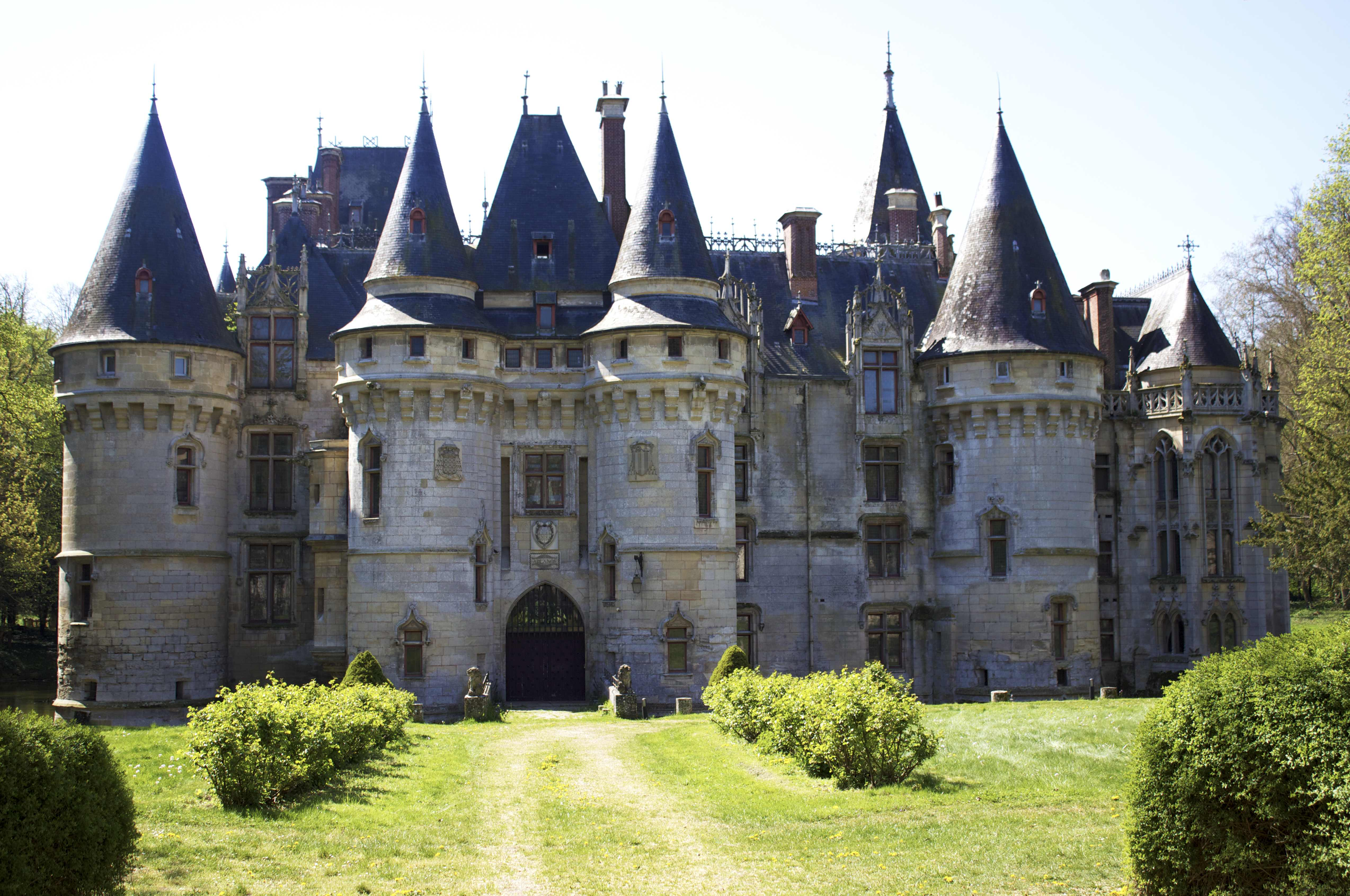
Château de Vigny

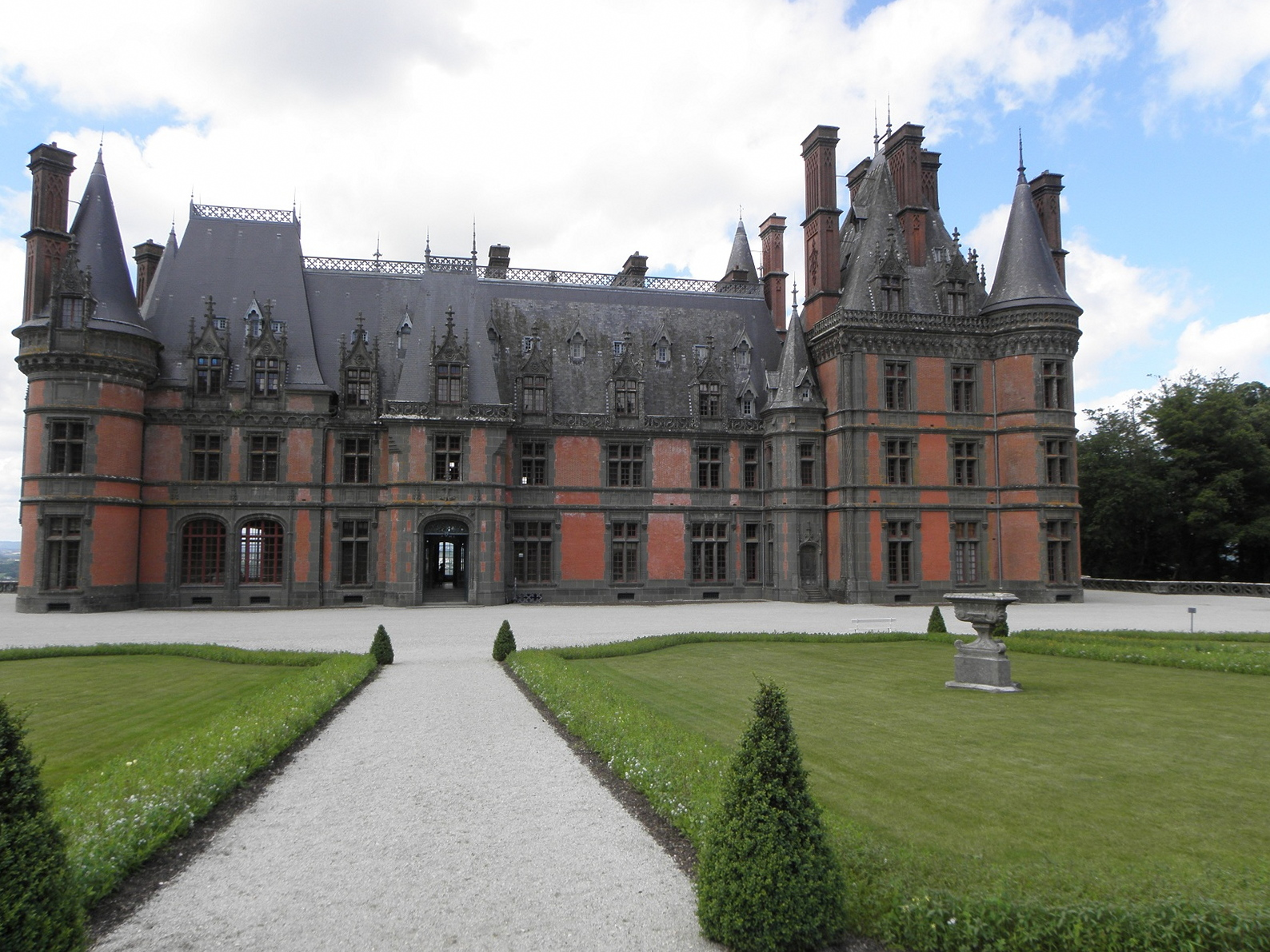
Château de Trévarez

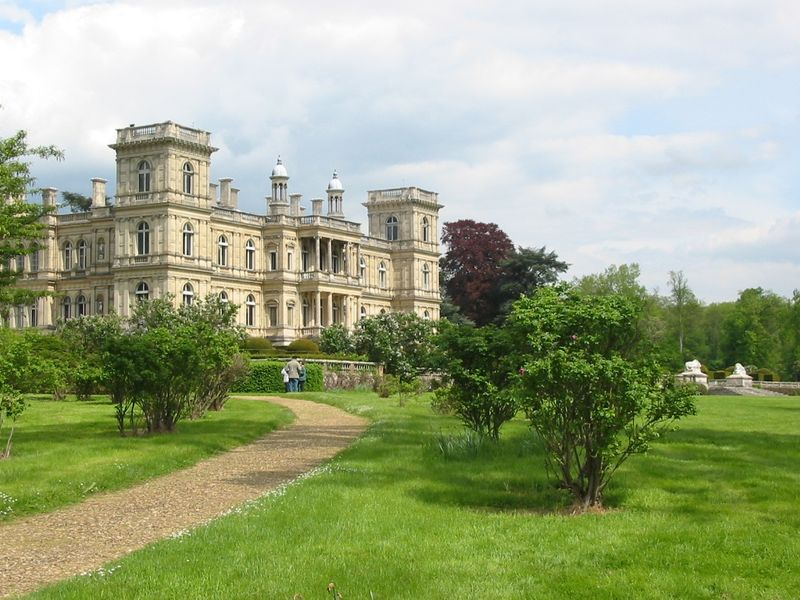
Château de Ferrières

== See also ==
- List of châteaux in France
- List of châteaux in Languedoc-Roussillon
- List of castles in France
- Châteauesque
- Château de Challain-la-Potherie
- Château d'Arenthon
