= Brenot =

Brenot is a surname. Notable people with the surname include:

- Maurice Brenot (1894–1964), Canadian ice hockey player
- Paul Brenot (1880–1967), French engineer and industrialist
- Pierre-Laurent Brenot (1913–1998), French painter
