= Mazères =

Mazères is the name or part of the name of the following communes in France:

- Mazères, Ariège, in the Ariège department
- Mazères, Gironde, in the Gironde department
- Mazères-de-Neste, in the Hautes-Pyrénées department
- Mazères-Lezons, in the Pyrénées-Atlantiques department
- Mazères-sur-Salat, in the Haute-Garonne department
