= Arenthon =

Arenthon Aranton (Savoyard)
- Commune
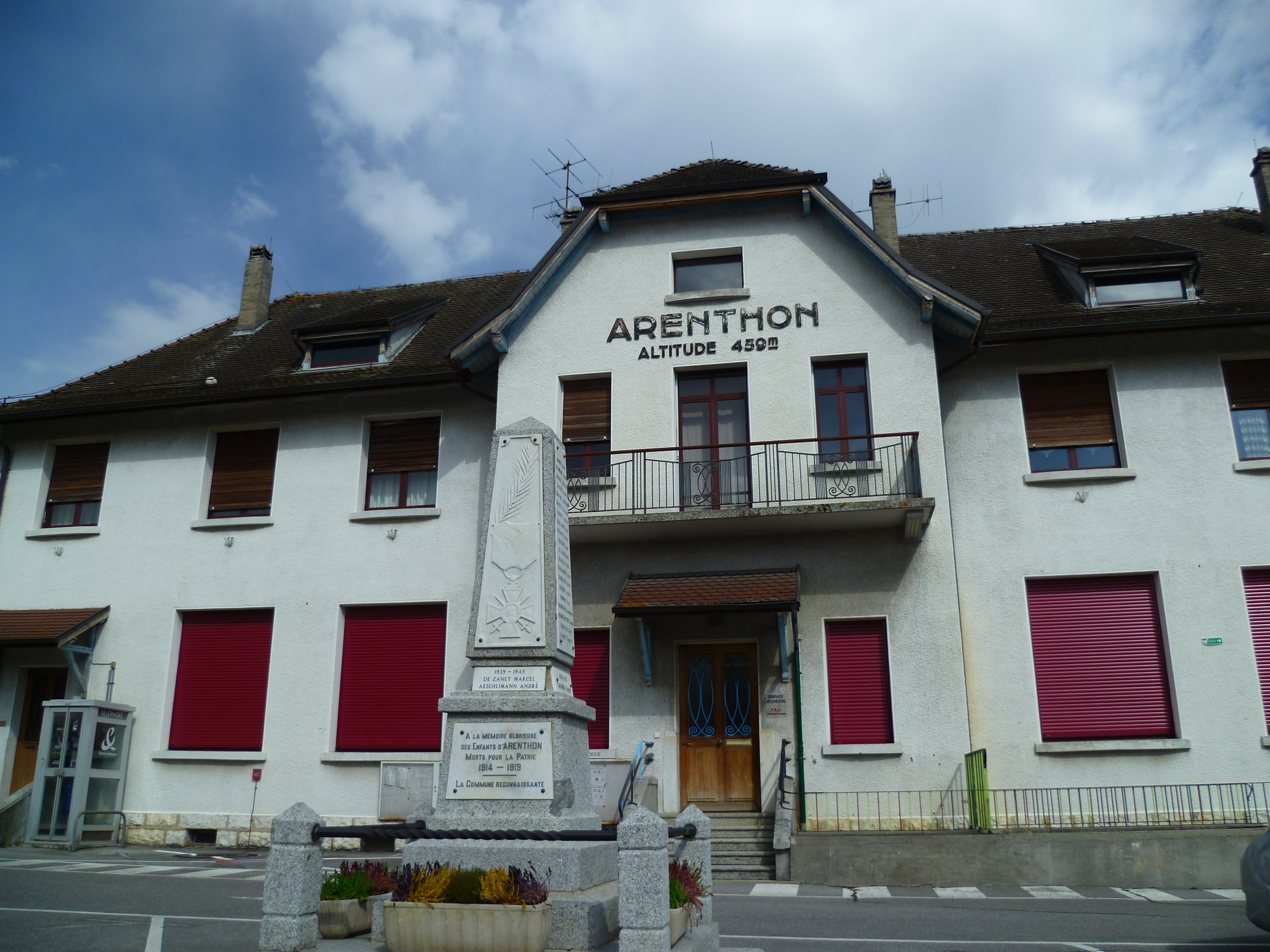
- Arenthon town hall

- Coat of arms
- Location of Arenthon
- Location within France Location within Auvergne-Rhône-Alpes
- Coordinates: 46°06′23″N 6°20′01″E
- Country: France
- Region: Auvergne-Rhône-Alpes
- Department: Haute-Savoie
- Arrondissement: Bonneville
- Canton: Bonneville
- Intercommunality: CC du Pays Rochois

Government
  - Mayor (2020–2026): Chantal Coudurier
- Area^{1}: 11.47 km^{2} (4.43 sq mi)
- Highest elevation: 481 m (1,578 ft)
- Lowest elevation: 429 m (1,407 ft)
- Population (2023): 2,097
  - Density: 182.8/km^{2} (473.5/sq mi)
- Time zone: UTC+01:00 (CET)
  - Summer (DST): UTC+02:00 (CEST)
- INSEE/Postal code: 74018 /74800
- ^{1} French Land Register data, which excludes lakes, ponds, glaciers > 1 km^{2} (0.386 sq mi or 247 acres) and river estuaries.

Arenthon (French pronunciation: [aʁɑ̃tɔ̃]; Savoyard: Aranton) is a commune in the Haute-Savoie department in the Auvergne-Rhône-Alpes region in south-eastern France.

== Population ==
Historical population
Year	Pop.	±% p.a.
1968	571	—
1975	641	+1.67%
1982	788	+2.99%
1990	952	+2.39%
1999	1,144	+2.06%
2007	1,391	+2.47%
2012	1,537	+2.02%
2017	1,741	+2.52%
2023	2,097	+3.15%
Source: INSEE

== See also ==
- Communes of the Haute-Savoie department
- Château d'Arenthon
