= Château d'Arenthon =

French castle

Arenthon Castle
- Château de Sonnaz
- Interactive map of Arenthon Castle
- Location: Arenthon; Haute-Savoie; Auvergne-Rhône-Alpes; France
- Coordinates: 46°06′15″N 6°19′56″E
- Type: Château
- Beginning date: 1628
- Dedicated to: Original purpose: Country residence Current purpose: Private residence
- Original owner: Arenthon family

The Château d'Arenthon, also known as the Château de Sonnaz, is a castle built in 1628 that served as the center of the seigneury of Arenthon. It is located in the commune of Arenthon, in the Haute-Savoie department of the Auvergne-Rhône-Alpes region. The structure replaced an earlier fortified castle, probably dating from the 13th century, of which only a few remnants remain.

== Location ==
The Château d'Arenthon is located in the commune of Arenthon, in the Haute-Savoie department of France, southwest of the town center, between Reignier and Bonneville. Situated on the plain, it is described as a spacious and comfortable residence rather than a fortified structure.

== History ==
=== Origins ===
Based on current historical research, the seigneury of Arenthon is believed to have originally belonged to the House of Faucigny-Lucinge. The d’Arenthon family is thought to have descended from this lineage. In the 15th century, following the marriage of Pierre d’Arenthon to Marguerite d’Alex, the last heiress of that line, the family adopted the name Arenthon d’Alex.

A document dated 8 March 1276 records that Guillaume de Lucinge, described as “former seneschal of Faucigny and lord of Arenthon,” participated in a transaction with the Grand Dauphine Béatrix de Faucigny. The Lucinge family “acknowledged holding all their possessions in Lucinge, in Arenthon, and throughout the barony of Faucigny” under the authority of the Lady of Faucigny.

A deed dated 30 May 1306 records the division of property among the sons of the knight Aimon de Lucinge. The eldest, Pierre, received “the fortified house of Arenthon with all its lands extending from the bridge of Boringe to the river Borne.”

=== Modern castle ===
In the 16th century, the d’Arenthon d’Alex family constructed the pavilion of the concierge’s lodge. On 8 August 1615, the land of Arenthon was elevated to a barony in favor of Philippe de Lucinge.

The medieval castle was demolished in 1628, and the seigneury of Arenthon was raised to a county by ducal decree in 1681.

In 1705, the seigneury passed by marriage to Édouard de Conzié. During the War of the Austrian Succession, Joseph-François de Conzié traveled to Madrid in 1746 on a diplomatic mission to negotiate with King Ferdinand VI for the improvement of Savoy’s situation, which had been under Spanish occupation since 1742.

The estate later passed, along with the château, to the Gerbais de Sonnaz family, who remained its owners until 1921. In 1924, the property was sold by the “Baroness de Livet, née de Sonnaz,” to Mr. Dumarais.

== Description ==
=== Medieval castle ===
No remains of the medieval castle have survived. Only a few small elements from the 13th century remain, notably in the passageways of the covered exterior corridors at the rear of the château. These include a door frame, the stone frames of openings that once contained the mechanism for closing the carriage gate, and several sections of wall from the original structure.

=== 17th-century castle ===
Arenthon Castle dates back to 1628, according to an inscription on the façade. “For a castle, it's practically in its youth!” according to Georges Chapier, author of Châteaux savoyards (1961), who observed that it is “one of the best-preserved survivors of the past in Faucigny.”

Historian Lucien Guy, in Les anciens châteaux du Faucigny (1929), described the building as a large, single-story, trapezoidal structure with wings opening at an obtuse angle and facing west, featuring several carriage gates. At the junction of the main building and the right wing, a vaulted passage leads to the park. The right wing originally contained the kitchen and service rooms.

A staircase provides access to the apartments on the upper floor. Among these rooms was the so-called “General’s Room,” associated with the de Sonnaz family, which overlooked the park, followed by a small chapel containing a portrait of Saint Francis de Sales.

According to Georges Chapier, the left wing, which contained the suite of apartments, was flanked at one of its outer corners by a round turret with a spiral staircase. A corbelled balcony was positioned above the porch opening of the ground-floor passageway.

Near the road leading to the château stands the former 16th-century concierge’s lodge, a Renaissance-style pavilion.

At the time of Chapier’s study, the château served as a rural residence, and by the 1980s it had been divided into several dwellings.

== See also ==
- Château
- Arenthon
- Castle

== Bibliography ==
- Baud, Henri; Mariotte, Jean-Yves; Guerrier, Alain (1980). Histoire des communes savoyardes : Le Faucigny [History of Savoyard municipalities: Le Faucigny] (in French). Roanne: Éditions Horvath. pp. 365–366. ISBN 2-7171-0159-4.
- Blondel, Louis (1978). Châteaux de l'ancien diocèse de Genève [Castles of the former diocese of Geneva] (in French). Vol. 7. Castles of the former diocese of Geneva.
- Chapier, Georges (1961). Châteaux savoyards : Faucigny et Chablais [Savoyard castles: Faucigny and Chablais] (in French). Vol. 5. Grenoble: Éditions Revue Les Alpes.
- Guy, Lucien (1929). "Les anciens châteaux du Faucigny - Château d'Arenthon (section)" [The ancient castles of Faucigny - Arenthon Castle (section)]. Mémoires & documents (in French). 47: 188–190.
- Regat, Christian; Aubert, François (1999). Châteaux de Haute-Savoie : Chablais, Faucigny, Genevois [Castles of Haute-Savoie: Chablais, Faucigny, Genevois] (in French). Éditions Cabédita. p. 27. ISBN 978-2-8829-5117-5.
