= Michel-Ange de Castellane =

French diplomat (1703-1782)

- Born: 1703
- Died: 1782 (aged 78–79)
- Occupation: French diplomat

Michel-Ange de Castellane (2 October 1703 – 26 September 1782) was comte of Castellane, a French diplomat, and a Brigadier in the army of ancien regime France. From 1741 to 1747 he served as France's ambassador to the Ottoman Empire.

== Life ==
He was born in Novezan. On 5 October 1729, he married Catherine de La Treille in Paris; they had one child, Esprit-Henri de Castellane (1730–1799).

He also became master of Le Rivau in 1768, but died at Villandry.On 23 July 1754 he bought the castellania of Villandry for 90,000 livres, as well as Savonnières, becoming count of Villandry in March 1758. He also became master of Le Rivau in 1768, but died at Villandry.
