= Château du Rivau =

Historic site in Touraine, France

Rivau Castle
- Château du Rivau (French)
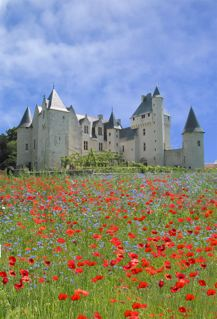

- Located in Touraine, France
- 47.103500°N 0.323228°E

History
- Built: 1445

Site notes
- Architectural style: French Medieval

The Château du Rivau is a castle in the village of Lémeré, Touraine, France. In the book of Rabelais' Gargantua, it was given to captain Tolmere as a reward for his victories in the Picrocholean Wars.

In 1429, towards the end of the Hundred Years' War, Joan of Arc and her followers came to fetch horses at Le Rivau. It was renowned for the quality of its equipage and war horses that were raised there. In 1510, François de Beauvau, captain of King Francis I of France, constructed the stables in the outbuildings' courtyard that supplied royal stallions. Those stables became the royal stables of Henry III and housed his stallions.

Since 1992, the new owners have undertaken a renovation campaign to prevent the decay of the castle and winery. It has been classified as a monument historique since 1918 by the French Ministry of Culture.

== The Castle ==
Château du Rivau has a shape reminiscent of 13th Century fortified castles. The square-shaped keep was the heart of the castle's fortification. The Rivau was one of the first ornamental castles to be built. In the dining hall, the biblical episode, Feast of Belshazzar, was painted over the fire mantelpiece by a Flemish master of the 16th century.

== History ==
The Château du Rivau is linked to the Beauvau family. Related to the Counts of Anjou, they had the privilege to pay homage to their suzerain with a sword at their side, standing, and wearing hats. During the 13th century, the Beauvau family served the Kings of France. They were then allied to the royal family through the marriage of Isabeau de Beauvau to Jean II de Bourbon in 1454. Many of the Beauvau family members gave their lives for the kingdom. During the 17th century, Le Rivau was protected by Richelieu as his sister Françoise was married to Jean de Beauvau, lord of Rivau. Once they became princes of Lorraine, the Beauvau family left the Touraine region. Le Rivau remained in the family's possession for 247 years.

In 1510, his heir, François de Beauvau, captain of François I, constructed the stables that supplied royal stallions in the outbuildings courtyard. He died at the Battle of Sesia River, at the side of Bayard, on April 30, 1524.

In 1768, the marquis Michel-Ange de Castellane, the lord of Villandry, acquired Le Rivau. He stayed there with his family until 1796.

Humanised by the Renaissance, Le Rivau is one of the most important monuments of the Touraine region. Rabelais cites Le Rivau in one of his novels: Gargantua, in which the title character, Gargantua offers it to his captain Tolmere as a reward for his victories during the Picrocholean War.

At the turn of the 20th century, the sculptor Alphonse de Moncel de Perrin, who worked on the ornamentation of the Petit-Palais in Paris, managed to have Le Rivau listed among the Historical Monuments in 1918. The painter Pierre-Laurent Brenot lived at Le Rivau from 1960 to 1992.

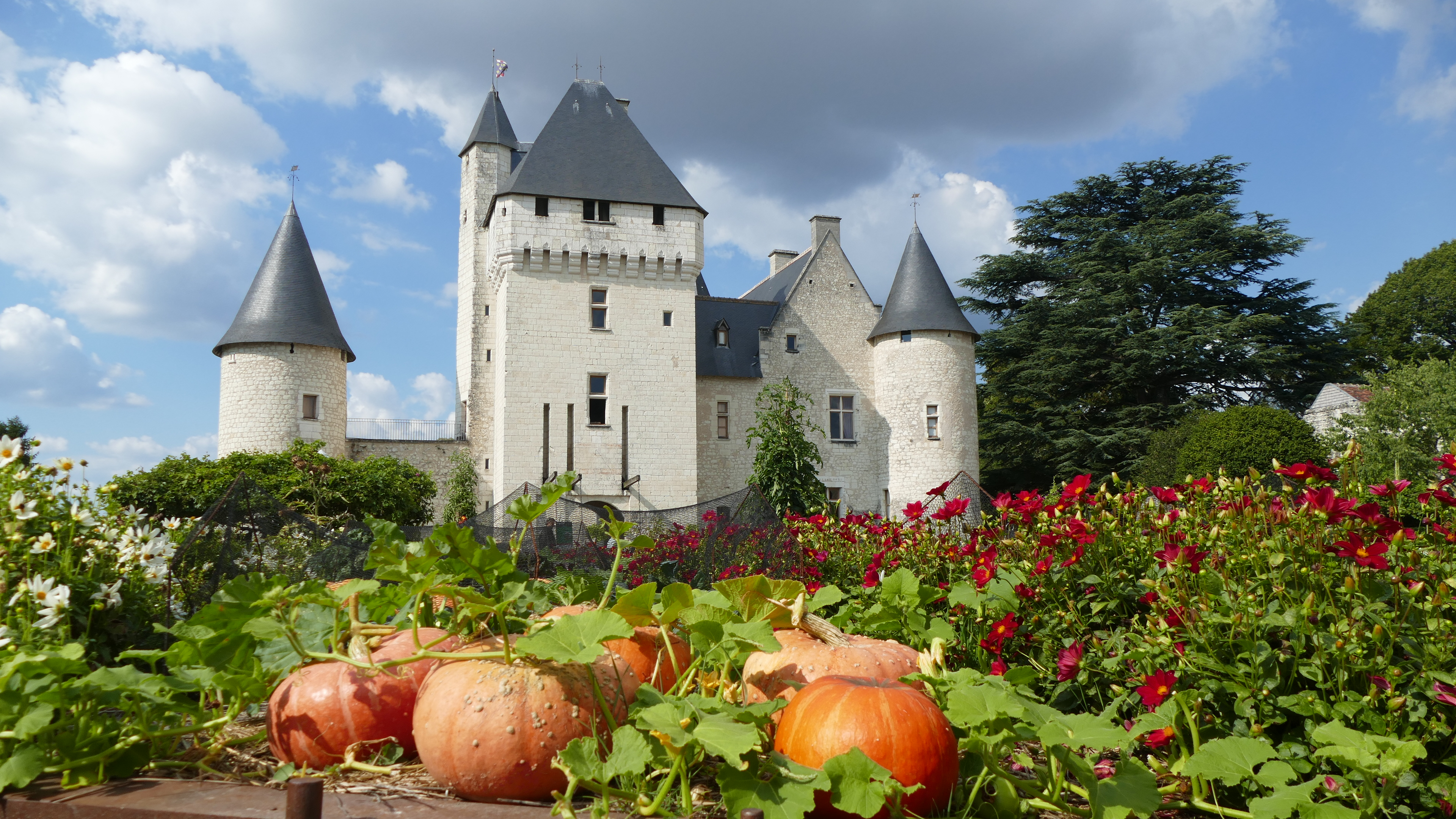
View of the facade of Château du Rivau from the vegetable conservatory

At the end of the 20th century Le Rivau was due for renewal after a long time of little to no upkeep, and underwent an 18-year-long restoration campaign.

== Royal Stable ==
Joan of Arc came to Le Rivau to fetch horses in 1429. At that time, war horses were already bred at le Rivau, where the current commons stand.

During the Renaissance period, François de Beauvau, the King's chief squire, decided to build stables (most certainly in wood) where they had existed at the time of the Hundred-Years War. He died during the battle of Romagne, to the side of Bayard in 1524. His heir, Gabriel de Beauvau undertook the erection of original stables, whose plans were directly inspired by the Italian architecture, knights had discovered while fighting for the King.

Until then the Rivau's stables were only meant to be functional and had no ornaments whatsoever. One of Le Rivau's main idiosyncrasies comes from the fact that for the first time in the history of equestrian architecture, stables were designed by an architect who developed a pioneer style.

== Gardens ==
The 12 gardens of Rivau are designated a Jardin Remarquable (by a French organisation that recognises remarkable gardens). They are inspired by fairy tales, myths, and legends. The Rivau gardens display a varying collection of flowers, mostly roses, which are from rose breeders such as André Eve or David Austin.

== Art ==
Le Rivau also contains a collection of contemporary sculptures that are displayed around the gardens, with pieces by artists such as Fabien Verschaere, Cat Loray, Jerôme Basserode, Frans Krajcberg and Philippe Ramette.

== Gallery ==
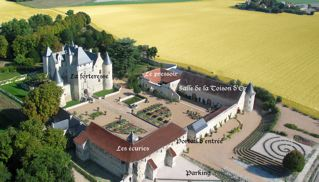
View from le Rivau in Summer

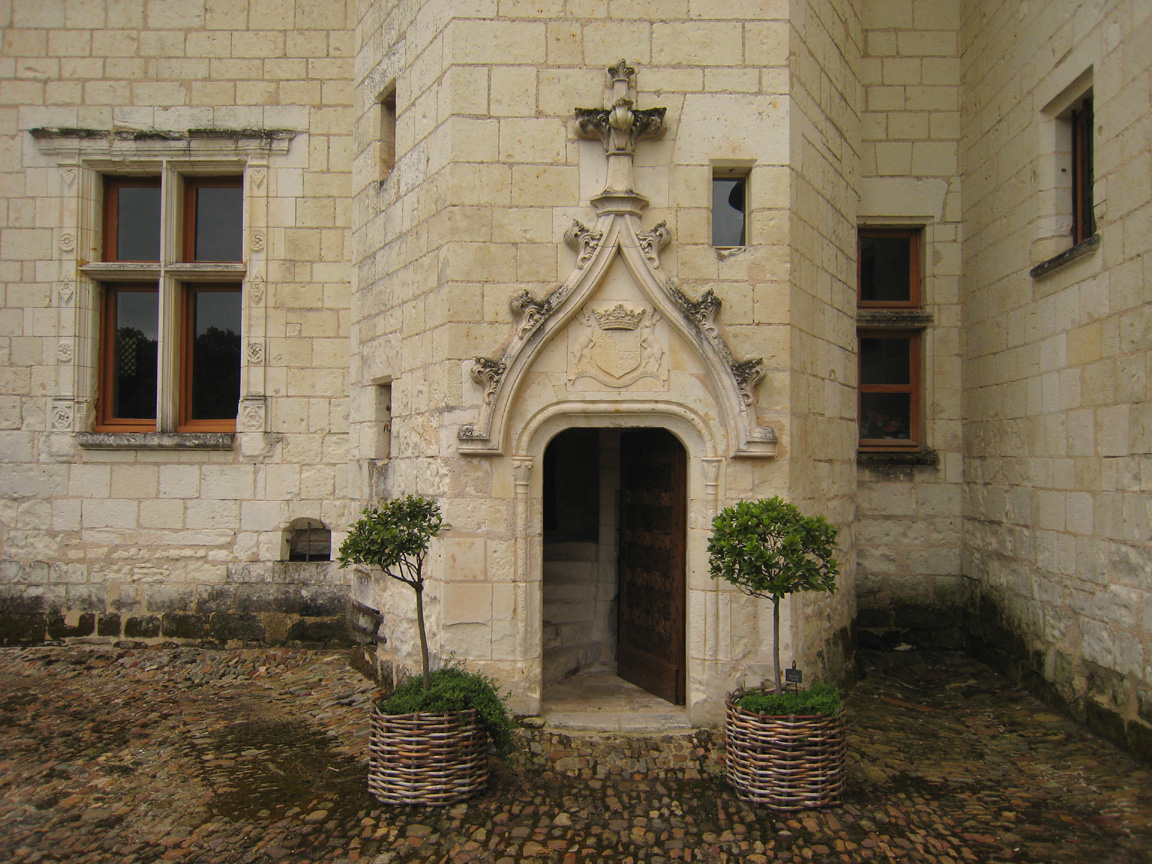
Entrance of Château du Rivau

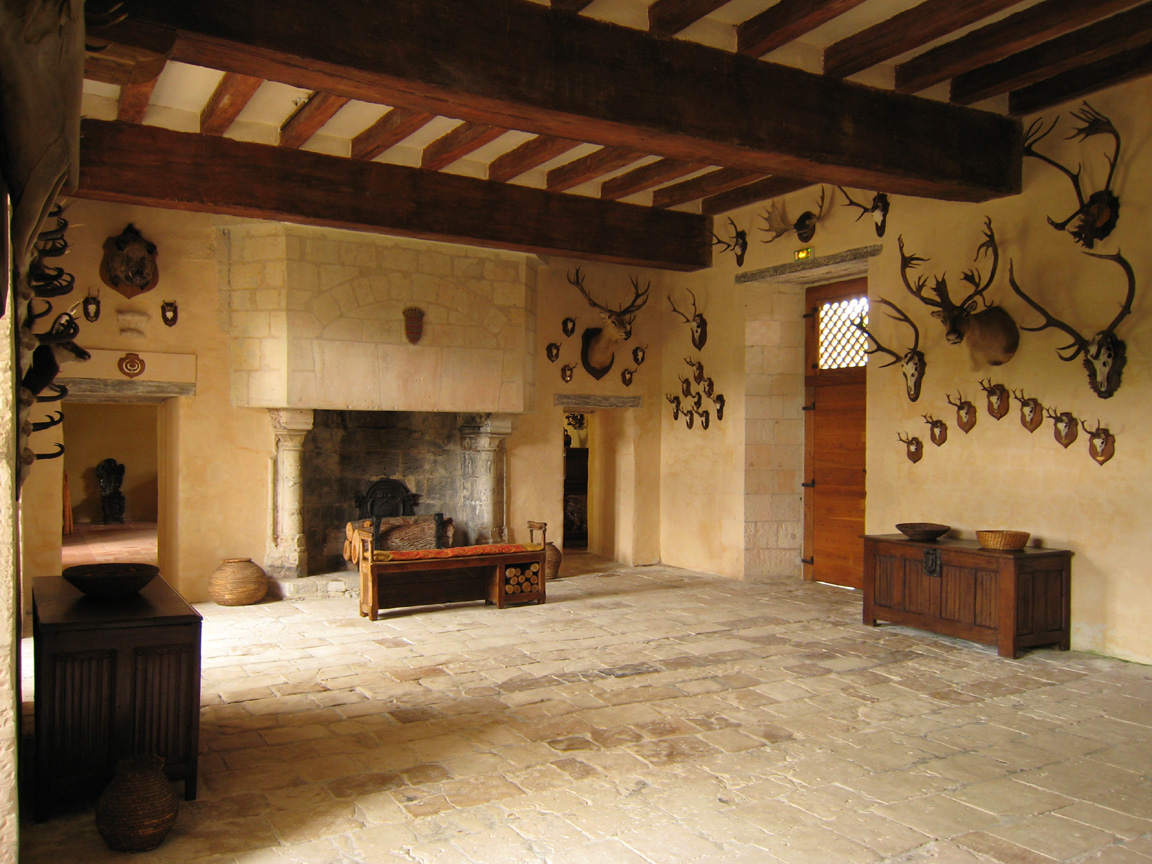
Great Hall of Château du Rivau

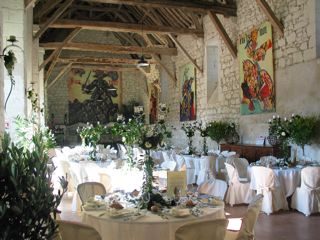
Golden Fleece Room, Château du Rivau

== See also ==
- List of castles in France
