= Mazères, Gironde =

Mazères
- Commune
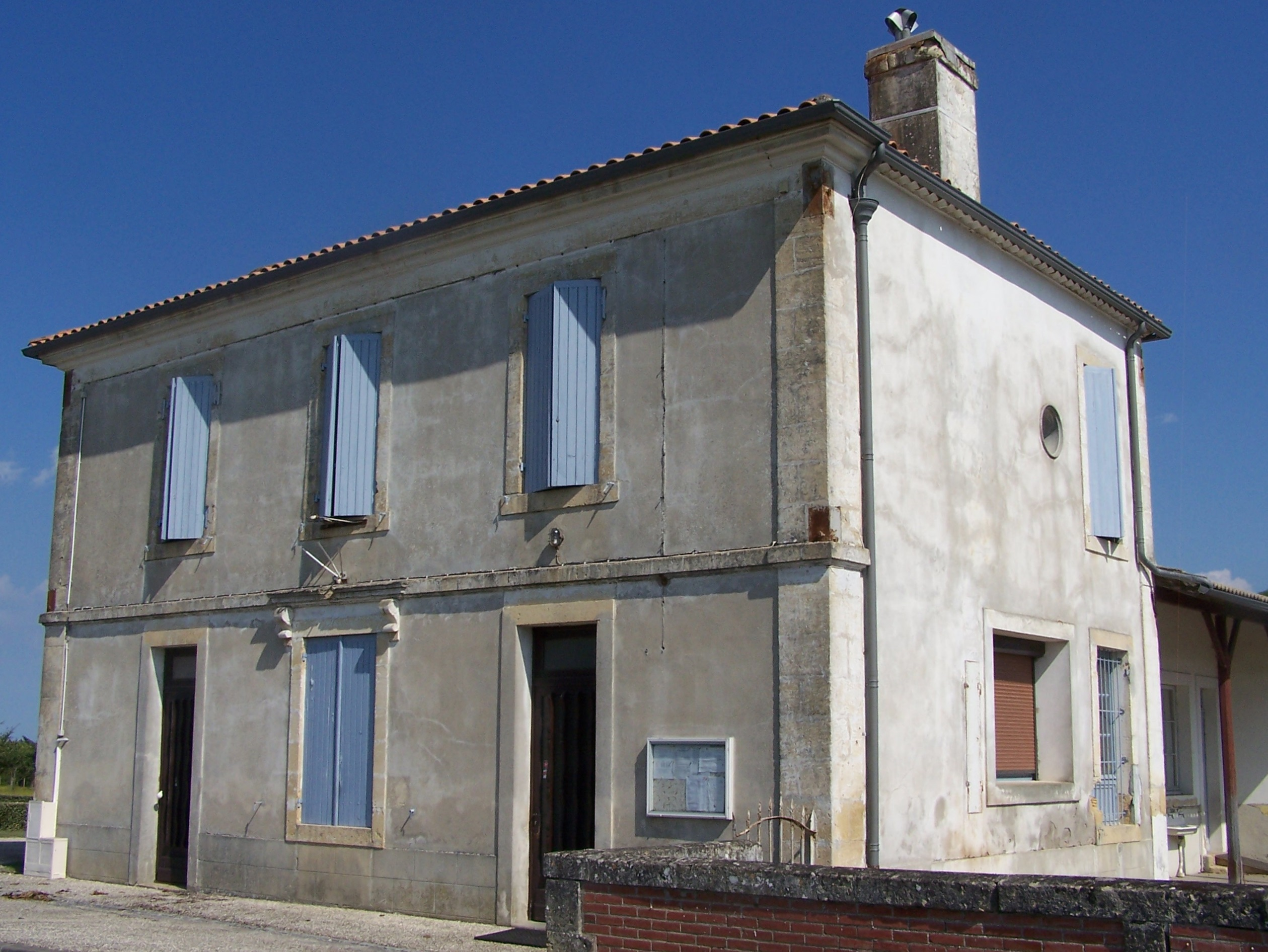
- Town hall
- Location of Mazères
- Location within France Location within Nouvelle-Aquitaine
- Coordinates: 44°29′46″N 0°15′26″W
- Country: France
- Region: Nouvelle-Aquitaine
- Department: Gironde
- Arrondissement: Langon
- Canton: Le Sud-Gironde
- Intercommunality: Sud Gironde

Government
  - Mayor (2020–2026): Michel Armand
- Area^{1}: 13.14 km^{2} (5.07 sq mi)
- Elevation: 84 m (276 ft)
- Highest elevation: 124 m (407 ft)
- Lowest elevation: 19 m (62 ft)
- Population (2023): 778
  - Density: 59.2/km^{2} (153/sq mi)
- Time zone: UTC+01:00 (CET)
  - Summer (DST): UTC+02:00 (CEST)
- INSEE/Postal code: 33279 /33210
- ^{1} French Land Register data, which excludes lakes, ponds, glaciers > 1 km^{2} (0.386 sq mi or 247 acres) and river estuaries.

Mazères (French pronunciation: [mazɛʁ]; Occitan: Masèras) is a commune in the Gironde department in Nouvelle-Aquitaine in southwestern France.

== Population ==
Historical population
| Year | Pop. | ±% p.a. |
|---|---|---|
| 1968 | 453 | — |
| 1975 | 406 | −1.55% |
| 1982 | 383 | −0.83% |
| 1990 | 453 | +2.12% |
| 1999 | 547 | +2.12% |
| 2007 | 627 | +1.72% |
| 2012 | 716 | +2.69% |
| 2017 | 761 | +1.23% |
| 2023 | 778 | +0.37% |
Source: INSEE

== See also ==
- Communes of the Gironde department
- Château de Roquetaillade
