= Château de Roquetaillade =

Castle in Mazères, Gironde, France

Coordinates: 44°29′33″N 0°16′11″W

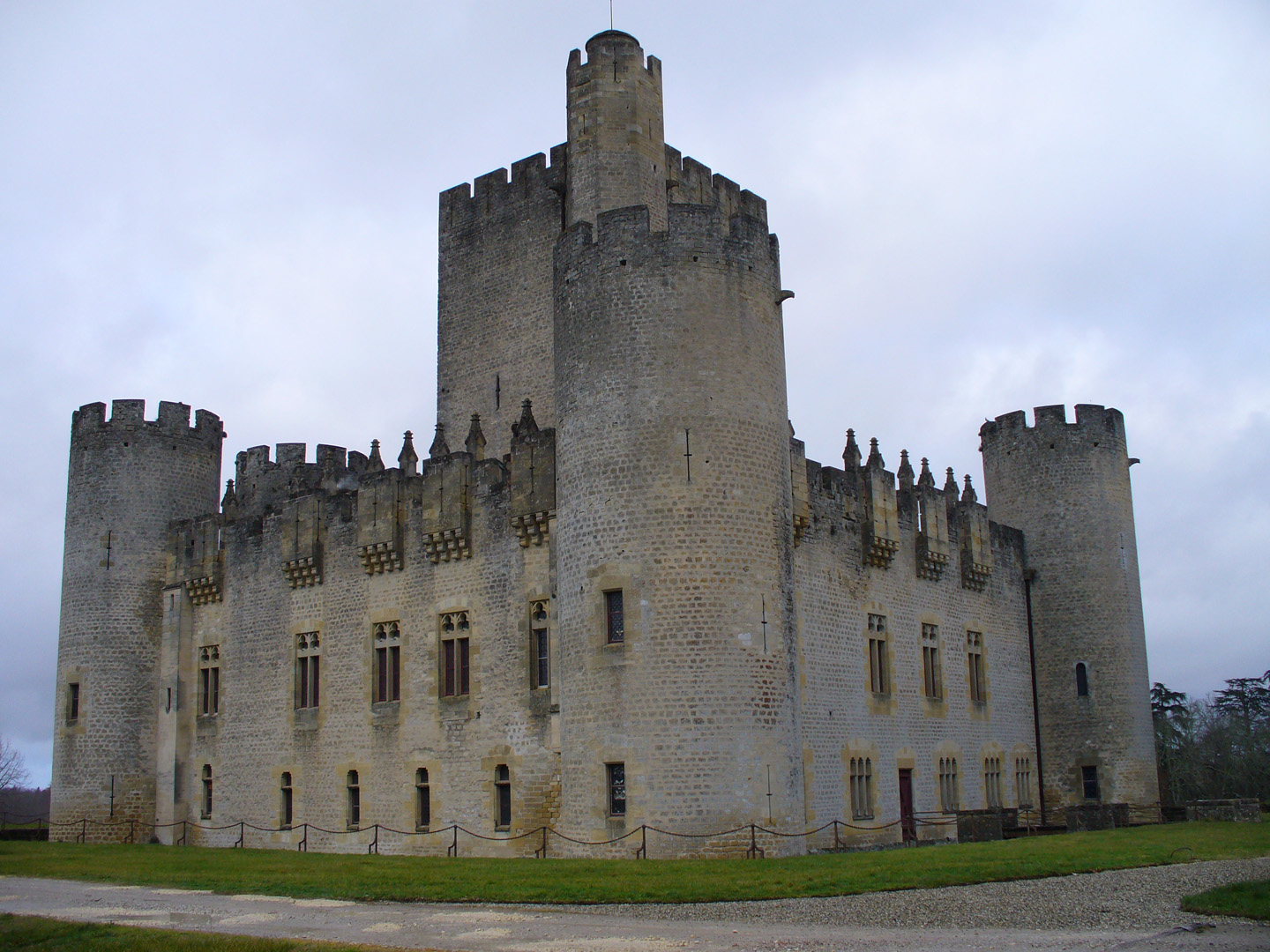
View of the "new castle"

The Château de Roquetaillade (French: [ʃɑto d(ə) ʁɔktɑjad]) is a castle in Mazères, France, near Bordeaux, in the department of Gironde.

== History ==
Roquetaillade means "carved in the rock". It is situated on a rocky spur under which are a series of caves inhabited by man since prehistoric times - there are artefacts in the ticket office. Oral tradition says that Charlemagne, the first Holy Roman Emperor, gathered an army here in the 8th century and built a wooden castle. Over the next 400 years, there were periods of unrest and invasions, and the castle evolved. In time, stone replaced wood, and the fortifications were strengthened. 11th-century archives mention for the first time Roquetaillade as a fortified village with its feudal system.

In 1305, Bertrand de Goth was elected Pope as Clement V, the first French Pope in Avignon. Thanks to papal finances and with the permission of King Edward I of England, he built seven castles for himself and his family in the Bazas area, south of Bordeaux, his native country. They are called the "Clementine Castles" and include the new castle of Roquetaillade (le Château Neuf) built in 1306 by his nephew Gaillard de Lamothe. Its architecture is similar to that built by Master James of Saint George (Maître Jacques de Saint-Georges) at the same time in North Wales, including Conwy, Harlech, Caernarfon and Beaumaris.

This new castle has a square plan with six towers and a central keep. It is technically perfect architecture that marks the apogee of "defensive science" before the arrival of gunpowder. The end of the Middle Ages was the beginning of a unified France and the centralisation of power in Paris by the king. The feudal system died out and, with the arrival of peace, Roquetaillade had no defensive purpose. The village was abandoned, and the military building was slowly transformed into a dwelling.

In 1599, the Lansacs modified the first floor with windows replacing the arrow slits and the old guard rooms transformed into fine living rooms, decorated by the first Renaissance fireplaces of the Bordeaux region.

In 1865, the Mauvezins employed the renowned architect Eugène Viollet-le-Duc to modernise their old building. Despite his many projects, Viollet-le-Duc accepted because, in his eyes, Roquetaillade was the perfect castle. Moreover, he had carte blanche and with this private contract there would be no civil servants on his back. At Roquetaillade, he was free to create his ideal medieval dream, with fully furnished living rooms, dining rooms, and bedrooms. This eruption of style and colours marks the missing link between Gothic art and Art Nouveau. The extraordinary interior decorations, with furnishings and paintings created by Viollet-le-Duc, were listed as French Heritage in 1976 by the French Ministry of Culture.

== Today ==
Never sold, the castle has been occupied by the same family for over 1,000 years. It has been open to the public since 1956 and is the most visited in the Bordeaux region. Open all year round, visits in English with the owners are also possible. Activities at the castle include the famous production of white Graves wines, "Château Fort de Roquetaillade", and Bazadais cattle breeding.

The castle has been used as a location in several films, including Fantômas contre Scotland Yard and Le Pacte des loups (Brotherhood of the Wolf).

== See also ==
- List of castles in France
