= Honore Brenot =

Canadian ice hockey player

- Born: March 19, 1899; Russell, Ontario, Canada
- Died: December 2, 1982 (aged 83)
- Height: 5 ft 10 in (178 cm)
- Weight: 185 lb (84 kg; 13 st 3 lb)
- Position: Defence
- Played for: Edmonton Eskimos
- Playing career: 1916–1928

George Honoré Brenot (March 19, 1899 – December 2, 1982) was a professional ice hockey player. He played with the Edmonton Eskimos of the Western Canada Hockey League.
