= Pierre-Laurent Brenot =

French painter

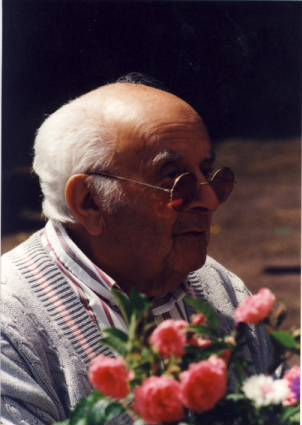
- Portrait of Pierre-Laurent
- Born: Raymond (Pierre-Laurent) Brenot; 8 July 1913; Paris
- Died: 8 May 1998 (aged 84); Loches
- Education: École Estienne
- Known for: Advertising, painting, fashion
- Awards: Gold Medal at the Salon des Artistes Français (1966) – Honour Medal from Moscow City (1986)

Pierre-Laurent Brenot (French: [pjɛʁ lɔʁɑ̃ bʁəno]; 8 July 1913 – 8 May 1998), was a French painter who also had a great activity in fashion and advertising. He is also known as the father of the "French pin-up".

== Biography ==
Raymond (Pierre-Laurent) Brenot was born on 8 July 1913 at the 44th of rue de Vanves, in the 14th district of Paris.

In 1928, he entered the Ecole Estienne (School of the Book), which he attended for three years.

In 1932, he studied with the French designer Fernand Hertenberger. Brenot's power of observation and accuracy of pen stroke are very soon noticed.

During the "Years of Fashion" (from 1936 to 1950), thanks to his daring and his talent, he was hired by Mr. Chatard, a great dressmaker for men and women, within the store "Fashionable" based at the 16th of the Boulevard Montmartre. Brenot then created a line of men's suits. Moving forward, he made many fashion drawings for other great designers and milliners (Christian Dior, Jacques Fath, Cristóbal Balenciaga, Nina Ricci, Jeanne Lafaurie, Charles Montaigne ...), for Lanvin and Rochas brands as well as for some milliners (Maude et Mano, Legroux, Paulette).

He soon began to draw portraits, including those of Arletty, Francoise Fabian, Boris Vian and Jean-Claude Brialy.

From 1944 onwards, he started a career as a poster artist and illustrator. However, with the rise of photography in the sixties, this activity shrank badly. Pierre-Laurent Brenot then moved backward to his original painter vocation.

Pierre-Laurent Brenot died on 8 May 1998, in his estate in Loches.

== Career as a poster artist ==
This important period took shape around different themes.

=== Show posters ===
From 1944 onwards, he produced numerous posters advertising cabaret and revue shows:

Title
Le Lido
La Comédie Caumartin
Bobino
Le Paradis Latin
Le Moulin Rouge
ParisLine for Line Renaud

=== Film posters ===
Around the 1950s, he was asked to design film posters, including :

Title	Year of Release	Director	Main Actors
Devil's Daughter (Fille du Diable)	1946	Henri Decoin	Pierre Fresnay Fernand Ledoux
The Beach (La Spraggia/La Pensionnaire)	1954	Alberto Lattuada	Martine Carol
Frou-Frou	1955	Augusto Genina	Dany Robin Philippe Lemaire
The Bride Is Much Too Beautiful (La mariée est trop belle)	1956	Pierre Gaspard-Huit	Brigitte Bardot
Love Is at Stake (L’amour est en jeu/Ma Femme, mon gosse et moi)	1957	Marc Allégret	Annie Girardot Robert Lamoureux
Les lavandières du Portugal	1957	Pierre Gaspard-Huit	Anne Vernon Jean-Claude Pascal
Casino de Paris	1957	André Hunebelle	Caterina Valente Gilbert Bécaud
Dishonorable Discharge (Ces dames préfèrent le mambo)	1958	Bernard Borderie	Pascale Robert Eddie Constantine Lino Ventura
Vive les vacances	1958	Jean-Marc Thibault	Michèle Girardon Jacqueline Maillan Roger Pierre
Venice, the Moon and You (Venezia, la luna e tu/Venise, la lune et toi)	1958	Dino Rissi	Marisa Allasio Nino Manfredi
Julie the Redhead (Julie la Rousse)	1958	Claude Boissol	Pascale Petit Daniel Gélin
Les misérables	1958	Jean-Paul Le Chanois	Danièle Delorme Jean Gabin Bernard Blier
School for Coquettes (L’école des cocottes)	1958	Jacqueline Audry	Odette Laure Jean-Claude Brialy Darry Cowl
La fille de Hambourg	1958	Yves Allégret	Daniel Gélin Hildegarde Kneff
The Female (La femme et le pantin)	1959	Julien Duvivier	Brigitte Bardot António Vilar
Marie des iles	1959	Georges Combret	Belinda Lee Magali Noël
La fièvre monte à El Pao	1959	Luis Buñuel	Maria Félix Gérard Philipe
Picnic on the Grass (Le déjeuner sur l’herbe)	1959	Jean Renoir	Catherine Rouvel Fernand Sardou Paul Meurisse
Ravissante	1960	Robert Lamoureux	Sylva Koscina Philippe Noiret
Lettere di una novizia (La novice)	1960	Alberto Lattuada	Pascale Petit Jean-Paul Belmondo
The Opportunists (1960 film) (La Rabouilleuse/Les Arrivistes)	1960	Louis Daquin	Madeleine Robinson Jean-Claude Pascal
The High Life (La grande vie)	1960	Julien Duvivier	Giuletta Masina Hannes Messemer
Les bonnes femmes	1960	Claude Chabrol	Bernadette Lafont Stéphane Audran
Les années folles	1960	Miréa Alexandresco Henri Torrent	
Napoléon II l’Aiglon	1961	Claude Boissol	Danièle Gaubert Georges Marchal Jean-Pierre Cassel
La bellezza di Ippolita (La beauté d’Hippolyte)	1962	Giancarlo Zagni	Gina Lollobridgida
Sodom and Gomorrah (1962 film) (Sodome et Gomorrhe)	1962	Robert Aldrich	Anouk Aimée Stewart Granger
Darling Caroline (Caroline Chérie)	1968	Denys De La Patellière	Bernard Blier Jean-Claude Brialy Charles Aznavour

== Career as an illustrator ==
=== Advertising graphics ===
The 1950s also saw the appearance of his first advertising posters for well-known brands, including :

- Chocolat Poulain;
- Lingerie Chantelle;
- Lingerie Lou;
- Parfum Soir de Paris de Bourjois;
- Lustucru;
- Vittel.

=== Fashion Illustrations ===
He has also been commissioned by a number of fashion magazines:

- Bonne Soirée;
- Formes et Couleurs;
- France-Élite;
- Images de France;
- Modes et travaux;
- Plaire;
- Prestige de Paris;
- La Vie Heureuse;
- Vogue;
- Votre Beauté.

=== The creation of the French Pin-Up ===
During this period, he was also responsible for the design of the French pin-up in various publications such as :

- Paris-Flirt;
- Paris-Hollywood;
- Le Rire;
- Stars et Vedettes;
- La Vie Parisienne.

== Career as a painter ==
Pierre-Laurent Brenot has always devoted a significant part of his time to painting. He devoted himself fully to it from the 1960s onwards.

He has painted the portraits of many artists:

- Arletty
- Brigitte Bardot
- Jean-Louis Barrault
- Julien Bertheau
- Pierre Bertin
- Jean-Claude Brialy
- Coccinelle
- Denise Clair
- Maurice Escande
- Françoise Fabian
- Renée Faure
- Serge Lifar
- Pascale Petit
- Line Renaud
- Madeleine Renaud
- José de Trévi
- Boris Vian
- Jean Weber
