= Priory of Chamonix =

Former Benedictine priory in Chamonix, France

The Priory of Chamonix was a Benedictine monastery established in the Chamonix Valley around the 11th century and completely destroyed by fire in December 1758.

== Geography ==
The foundation charter states that the Count of Geneva granted: "all the extent of land situated between the torrent of the Diosaz, Mont Blanc and the Col de Balme, consisting of arable land, forests, pastures and hunting grounds". The entirety of the lands granted by the count to the monks of Saint-Michel-de-la-Cluse corresponds more or less to the Chamonix valley. However, the translation of rupes alba as “White Rock” cannot refer to “Mont Blanc,” as Charles Durier believed, according to Canon Joseph Garin or Jean-Yves Mariotte.,

Two hypotheses have been proposed concerning the location of this place. André Perrin and Joseph Garin suggested that it might refer to a rock face called Roche-Blanche, situated at the confluence of the Diosaz and the Arve, near Servoz or in the commune of Passy. However, the rock could no longer be identified during later investigations. Joseph Garin in fact relied on the work of L. Felisaz, a land surveyor in Servoz. The latter considered that the indications in the charter referred to the Balmes mountain, near the Salenton pass, in the upper Diosaz valley, and placed the rock at the entrance to the Diosaz gorges — the Saix Blanc, a rock overlooking the entrance to the river gorges, at the place known as “La Chauffiaz”.

The donation excluded Vallorcine, as well as Vaudagne and the parish of Le Lac, which were situated on the left bank of the Arve.

== History ==
=== Origins ===
The foundation of the Priory of Chamonix took place in two stages: first, through the donation of the Chamonix valley to the Abbey of Sacra di San Michele, in the Susa Valley, by the Count of Geneva; and second, through the establishment of the priory itself.

The donation of the valley is mentioned in a charter known as the “1091 charter”, although the document itself bears no date., (Note: « In nomine sanctæ et individuæ Trinitatis. Ego, Aymo, comes Gebennensis, et filius meus Geroldus, damus et concedimus Domino Deo Salvatori nostro, et sancto Michaeli Archangelo, de Clusà omnem campum munitum cum appenditiis suis, ex aquà quæ vocatur Dionsa, et rupe quæ vocatur Alba, usque ad Balmas, sicut ex integro ad comitatum meum pertinere videtur ; id est, terras, sylvas, alpes, venationes, omnia placita et banna, et monachi Deo et Archangelo servientes hoc totum habeant et teneant sine contradictione alicujus hominis, et nihil nobis nisi eleëmosinas et orationes pro animabus nostris et parentum nostrorum retinemus, ut sanctus Michaël Archangelus perducat nos et illos in paradisum exultationis. Si quis autem, quod absit, hoc donum confringere voluerit, in anathemate et maledictione sit, sicut Datan et Abiron, quoùsque resipiscat et satisfaciat. Ex istis ergo donis sunt legitimi testes, uterini fratres comitis Willelmus Fulciniacus, et Amedeus, et Thurumbertus de Nangiaco, et Albertus miles, et Agueldrandus presbiter, et Silico. Ego Andreas, comitis capellanus, hanc cartam præcepto ipsius comitis scripsi, et tradidi ferià septimà lunà 27e, papa Urbano regnante.») The signatures of the individuals involved have nevertheless made it possible to propose this date., (Note: The count's signature is accompanied by the mention of Pope Urban II (1088–1099).) The deed was first published by Samuel Guichenon (1660), and was subsequently reproduced by later authors. The document records the donation of the Chamonix valley by the Count of Geneva, Aymon I of Geneva, and his son Géraud of Geneva, to the Benedictine monks of the Abbey of Sacra di San Michele, located in Piedmont., (Note: Act of the year 1091, "(1090 according to Joseph-Antoine Besson) Foundation of the Priory of Chamonix" (REG 0/0/1/219).), Following a detailed analysis of the charter, archivist Jean-Yves Mariotte argued that several elements contradict a dating to the end of the 11th century, and instead point more toward the second half of the 12th century, or perhaps even the beginning of the 13th century. However, this analysis does not rule out the possibility of a donation made toward the end of the 11th century, between 1089 and 1099. The document, therefore, appears rather to be “a genuine act transcribed or rewritten at a later date and perhaps stripped of clauses compromising the independence of the monastery”.,

The document reveals two facts: on the one hand, the “enormity of the concession,” which the monks needed to have confirmed, perhaps in response to claims made by the peasants of the valley; and on the other, the surprising assertion that the priory was “free from all secular ties” from the moment of its creation,

It was probably not until the 12th century that the first monks settled in the valley. Jean-Yves Mariotte draws a parallel between the establishment of the monks and the construction of a stone church in 1119, traces of which appear in the records of the Diocese of Geneva. However, this date is uncertain, since it derives from an inscription that has since disappeared. Ultimately, the first mention of the monastery is linked to the appointment of an abbot jointly overseeing the priory of Megève in 1204, while not calling into question the likelihood of an earlier presence, perhaps even dating back to the donation made by Count Aymon I of Geneva.The first priors to be mentioned appear at the beginning of the 13th century, with, according to the Régeste genevois, a certain Aimon in 1202 (Note: Act dated 19 September 1202 (REG 0/0/1/480).), and in 1205 a certain Pierre (Note: Act dated 13 March 1205 (REG 0/0/1/493).), who also directed the priory of Megève. Around 1212, another figure, a certain Étienne, likewise headed the priory of Megève. However, none of them bore the title of Prior of Chamonix. This title appears only from 1224 onward. The Régeste genevois thus mentions Gaufred (1229) (Note: Act dated 20 April 1229 (REG 0/0/1/645).), Humbert de Beaufort (1255 (Note: Act between 1226 and 1255 (REG 0/0/1/875).), also mentioned as prior from 1255 to 1296), Richard de Villette (1264–1296) (Note: Act dated 5 June 1264 (REG 0/0/1/971).), and Guillaume de Villette (1296–1323) (Note: Act dated 18 July 1307 (REG 0/0/1/1609).)

It nevertheless appears that the monastery was of limited importance and housed only four monks, or at most around ten., Moreover, it did not establish any daughter houses.

The first mention of the human community of Chamonix, or universitas, dates only from 1264.

The priory’s rise in importance dates from the second half of the 13th century, marked on the one hand by the use of the title “Prior of Chamonix,” and on the other by the assertion of the monastery’s temporal power under Humbert de Beaufort (c. 1255–c. 1296)., He thus obtained rights over Vallorcine, where he had a church and the parish of Le Lac built. The lordship (mandement) of Chamonix, therefore, corresponded to the territories of the parishes of Chamonix, Vallorcine, and part of Notre-Dame-du-Lac.

=== Protection and tensions in the valley ===
Protection of the valley was contested by the Counts of Geneva and the Lords of Faucigny. Both noble families jointly claimed authority over the valley. Depending on the period, control was held by one family or the other.

The various challenges to the monastery’s temporal authority by the mountain communities then served as a pretext for these two families to intervene to resolve the conflicts and thereby gain control over the valley. The stance of the local populations was often imbued with a desire for independence. André Perrin thus noted at the end of the 19th century regarding the Chamonix Valley that “the administration of criminal justice was reserved for the syndics or elders elected by their peers, to the exclusion of the priors, landlords, and their judges”. He further observed that “this important prerogative, which dated back to Germanic freedoms, remained intact throughout the Middle Ages in most of the high valleys of Savoy and Valais”. The first recorded syndics of Chamonix date back to 1292, though they did not appear to have become permanent until 1441. However, Nicolas Carrier notes, in a study published in 2003, that this idyllic vision of the independence of mountain communities was somewhat exaggerated.

However, as early as the 13th century, the peasants of the valley achieved a degree of independence by obtaining charters. In fact, the inhabitants banded together in 1289 to secure rights against the priory. To avoid arrest, some took refuge at the Château de Charousse, located downstream in the valley, near Passy,, (Note: Act dated 19 May 1289 (REG 0/0/1/1291).), (Note: Act dated 7 February 1291 (REG 0/0/1/1328).), (Note: Act dated 20 September 1291 (REG 0/0/1/1348).). Rebels thus sought refuge there in 1289. The nine peasants, led by a certain Jacques Pecloz, went to the lands of the Counts of Geneva, taking with them furniture and animals from the priory, and obtained the protection of Count Amadeus II of Geneva, knowing that at that time the valley was under the control of the lords of Faucigny. On this occasion, the Count of Geneva asserted that he held the “advocacy and criminal jurisdiction over the valleys,” thereby opposing the recognition of the rights of the lords of Faucigny. An amicable arbitration process began. On October 21, 1289, in Sallanches, the two parties appointed the Dauphin Humbert I of Viennois and Jean de Genève, Bishop of Valence, as well as Guillaume de Livron, Archbishop of Vienne, as chief arbitrator. On February 7, 1291, the final decision was announced in Bonneville by the new arbitrators Guillaume de Prissy and Aimeric de Glières, representing Béatrice de Faucigny on one side, and Pierre de Compey and Jacques Exchaquet, representing Amédée II of Geneva; the Dauphin served as the chief arbitrator. The Grand Dauphine secured the Count of Geneva’s renunciation of his claims in exchange for a payment of 500 Viennese pounds, while in turn renouncing “all hostility, particularly regarding the men of Chamonix who had taken refuge with the count.” In September, the count also issued a proclamation stating that he held no rights over the Chamonix valley.

On July 26, 1292, the community acknowledged that “the entire valley… and all its men are vassals of the prior,” but the prior simultaneously recognized the inhabitants’ ancient customs. Further tensions and arbitrations would occur subsequently in 1330, 1368, 1386, 1421, 1441, and 1493., In 1355, Faucigny became a possession of the Counts of Savoy, who thereby obtained various rights over the valley. Finally, when the House of Savoy acquired the County of Geneva in the early 14th century, issues of custody no longer arose.

In 1439, Guillaume de La Ravoire, son of Guigon de La Ravoire of Montmélian and close associate of Duke Amadeus VIII of Savoy, became commendatory prior and temporal lord of Chamonix, Vallorcine, and Le Lac. He attempted to regain direct control over criminal justice, He lost the ensuing lawsuit against the valley community. In 1487 he transferred his office to his son Jacques (1487–1502),, who continued his father's policy and obtained a more favorable judgment from the papacy. Another son, Guillaume the Younger, succeeded him between 1502 and 1520.

The priory was completely destroyed by fire in December 1758.

== Description ==
According to a text from 1677, the monastery “comprised a fortified house and an adjoining church, whose choir was reserved for the religious, who entered from the priory, while the nave served as the parish church and was entered through the great door outside the priory, which formed the title of the fortified house and convent”..

== Remains ==
The fortified house of the priory, now known as the “Maison de la Montagne”, located near the church, was formerly the chapel of Notre-Dame, which together with Saint-Félix chapel formed the two arms of the priory church, built in the shape of a cross.

Today it survives as a massive square building with a smaller attached structure at the rear. Several ancient architectural elements remain visible, including a vaulted doorway beside a column shaft; to the north, a small niche framed by two pilasters; to the west, two small windows beside another vaulted door; and to the south, a defaced coat of arms bearing the date 1564..

== Possessions ==
- Tour de Saint-Jeoire, at Servoz
  It stood at the entrance to the bridge crossing the Arve and collected tolls on all merchandise coming from Faucigny into the priory’s lands.

== See also ==
- Order of Saint Benedict
- History of Savoy in the Middle Ages

== Bibliography ==
- Baud, Henri; Mariotte, Jean-Yves (1980). Histoire des communes savoyardes : le Faucigny [History of the Savoyard Communes: Faucigny]. Roanne: Éditions Horvath. p. 619. ISBN 2-7171-0159-4.
- Besson, Joseph-Antoine (1759). Mémoires pour l'Histoire ecclésiastique des diocèses de Genève, Tarentaise, Aoste et Maurienne et du décanat de Savoie [Memoirs for the Ecclesiastical History of the Dioceses of Geneva, Tarentaise, Aosta and Maurienne and of the Deanery of Savoy]. Sébastien Hénault imprimeur.
- Bonnefoy, Jacques Adrien (1879). Le Prieuré de Chamonix : documents relatifs au prieuré et à la vallée de Chamonix [The Priory of Chamonix: Documents Relating to the Priory and the Chamonix Valley]. Chambéry: Imprimerie Chatelain – via Gallica.
- Carrier, Nicolas (2003). "Les communautés montagnardes et la justice dans les Alpes nord-occidentales à la fin du Moyen Âge Chamonix, Abondance et les régions voisines, XIVe-XVe siècles" [Mountain Communities and Justice in the Northwestern Alps at the End of the Middle Ages: Chamonix, Abondance and Neighboring Regions, 14th–15th Centuries]. Cahiers de recherches médiévales et humanistes. 10: 89–118. Carrier 2003.
- Lullin, Paul; Le Fort, Charles (1866). Régeste genevois [Genevan Regesta]. Société d'histoire et d'archéologie de Genève.
- Mariotte, Jean-Yves (1978). "Les origines du prieuré de Chamonix" [The Origins of the Priory of Chamonix]. Bibliothèque de l'École des chartes. 136 (2): 241–269.
- Perrin, André (1887). Le prieuré de Chamonix. Histoire de la vallée et du prieuré de Chamonix du XIe au XVIIe siècle, d'après les documents recueillis par A. Bonnefoy, notaire à Sallanches [The Priory of Chamonix: History of the Valley and Priory of Chamonix from the 11th to the 17th Century, from Documents Collected by A. Bonnefoy, Notary at Sallanches]. Vol. 1. Chambéry: Imprimerie Chatelain.
