= Château de Charousse =

Medieval castle in France

- Château de Pierre Brûlée
- Interactive map of Château de Charousse
- Location: Country: France; Former provinces of the Duchy of Savoy: County of Geneva; Region: Auvergne-Rhône-Alpes; Department: Haute-Savoie; Municipality: Passy
- Coordinates: 45°55′48″N 6°40′27″E
- Type: Castle
- Beginning date: around the 11th century
- Completion date: 12th century/13th century
- Purpose: Original: Seigneurial residence Current: Ruined

The Château de Charousse (Charosse), also known as Pierre Brûlée (castro de Charossa), was a medieval castle dating from the 11th century, now entirely disappeared. It was situated in the County of Geneva but constituted an enclave within Faucigny. The site was located above the commune of Passy in the department of Haute-Savoie, in the Auvergne-Rhône-Alpes region.

== Location ==
The castle was constructed on a buttress of the Aiguille de Varens, on the right bank of the Arve, at an altitude of about 1,000 meters. Positioned above the village of Passy, it commanded the upper Arve valley between Sallanches and the defile leading to the Chamonix valley, as well as the routes toward the Col de Megève and the Val d’Arly, and the Val Montjoie.

Access to the site was possible only from the eastern side. Owing to its position overlooking the mountain, the castle is often described as an “eagle’s nest.”

The castle served as the center of a mandement on the right bank of the Arve. To the north, it bordered the lands of the Priory of Chamonix, with the Diosaz torrent marking the boundary between the two fiefs.

== Toponymy ==
Canon Gros' records mentions of Charousse beginning in the 13th century. The earliest reference appears in a 1225 document naming a Guillaume de Cherrossa, according to the Régeste genevois. Variants of the name appear as Charossa in 1250 and 1268 (cited by Samuel Guichenon), Carossia in 1296, and Charosia in 1485.

The origin of the toponym is interpreted in several ways. Louis Blondel derives “Charousse” from charoutze, meaning “burnt rock.” Canon Adolphe Gros proposes a derivation from calma russea, meaning “red pasture.” Henri Suter’s interpretation, paralleling that of “Chamrousse,” links the name to a mountain pasture, formed from Cha (from the Gaulish calmis) combined with the adjective rousse.

== History ==
=== A Savoyard fief in the hands of the Genevois ===
Swiss archaeologist Louis Blondel dates the oldest identifiable remains of the site, particularly those of the tower, to the late 12th or early 13th century. He also considers that the earliest structures may be older, possibly originating in the 11th century.

The name Charousse is first recorded in 1225 in a transaction at Thônex involving Count William II of Geneva and Aymon II of Faucigny as part of a conflict settlement. The castle is attested in 1250 according to the Régeste genevois. It functioned as the center of a châtellenie. The lords of the mandement were vassals of the County of Geneva, making the territory an enclave within Faucigny, although certain seigneurial rights appear to have been held by the Counts of Savoy. Historians attribute this situation to the marriage of Thomas I of Savoy and Margaret of Geneva around 1196. The Counts of Geneva regularly rendered homage to the Counts of Savoy for the fief.

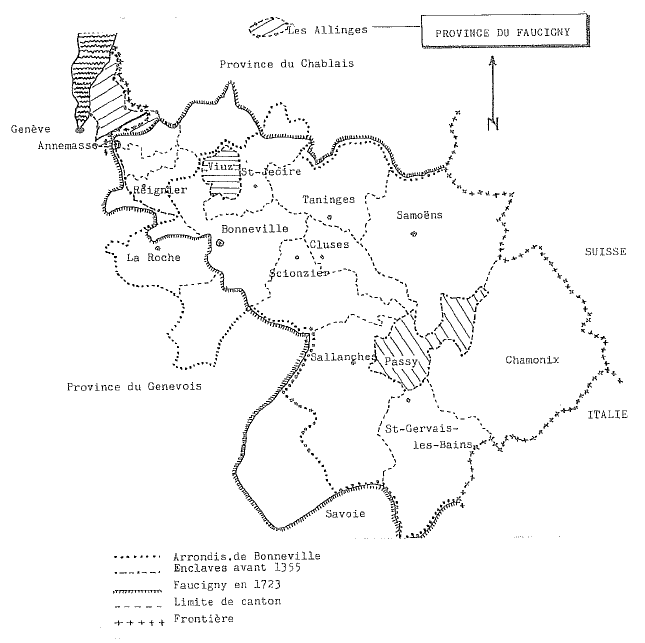
The Charousse (Passy) castellany, enclosed within Faucigny territory.

The status of the seigneury became more complex with the expansion of Savoyard influence in the valley. In the late first half of the 13th century, the Counts of Savoy established alliances with the lords of Faucigny. Peter II of Savoy married Agnès of Faucigny, heiress of the House of Faucigny, in 1234. In 1249 or 1250, Count Peter II of Savoy seized the castle of Charousse from Count William II of Geneva. In 1259, Pierre of Savoy asserted rights over the seigneury on the basis of the succession rights of his brother, Count Amadeus IV of Savoy, who held shares in the fief. He launched a military campaign and captured the castle. Rodolphe, the new Count of Geneva, refused to render homage for the castle and was dispossessed of it, with the fief being granted to Pierre Martin. A conflict between the two men continued until 1260, when the Count of Geneva accepted submission and regained control of the castle.

The peasants of the Chamonix valley, who were in conflict with the local priory, periodically sought refuge at the castle, with rebels taking shelter there in 1289.

In 1308, a new peace treaty was concluded between the Houses of Geneva and Savoy. Under its terms, the new Count of Geneva, William III, was required to acknowledge holding “the castles and jurisdictions of Charousse, Alby, Hauteville, and La Corbière” in fief from Count Amadeus V.

Béatrice of Faucigny pursued a policy of independence and opposition to her uncle, the Count of Savoy. Between 1282 and 1330, the alignment between Béatrice until her death in 1310, then her successor, her grandson Jean II of Viennois, and the Counts of Geneva remained consistent, particularly during the Delphino-Savoyard conflicts from 1310 to 1337. By this time, the castle had lost its strategic significance. During this period, however, it was pledged as part of the dowry for the marriage of Agnès of Savoy and William III, Count of Geneva, on 31 August 1297.

After 1330, tensions renewed between the lords of Geneva and Faucigny, restoring the castle’s strategic significance. The châtelain conducted raids on surrounding territories of Faucigny. The Treaty of 5 January 1355 formalized the acquisition of Faucigny by Count Amadeus VII of Savoy. In 1358, agreements were reached between Amadeus III, Count of Geneva, and Amadeus VI, Count of Savoy, regarding the châtellenie and other lands in Faucigny.

=== Disappearance of the County of Geneva and inheritance ===
In 1401, the County of Geneva was acquired by Count Amadeus VIII of Savoy. Charousse and its mandement were not included in this acquisition and remained with the heirs of the House of Geneva. In 1409, Matilda of Savoy inherited the rights from her aunt Blanche of Geneva, who had previously inherited them from her mother, the dowager Countess Mathilde of Auvergne. The Count of Savoy later negotiated to acquire the remaining rights, and a contract between the heiress—then a minor under the guardianship of her uncle Louis of Savoy-Achaea—and the duke was signed on 11 January 1417.

The stones of the castle are reported to have been reused in the construction of the village of Bay.

== Description ==
Only fragments of the Château de Charousse’s surrounding walls remain. The fortress featured a shield wall forming an angle of approximately 140°.

Due to its location on a mountainside, the castle was accessible only from the east, above a vertical rock face over 100 meters high. The north side was likely defended by a square keep measuring about 10 meters per side, complemented by an enclosure with moats on the north and east sides. The walls, built on an embankment, were approximately 2.5 meters thick and protected the eastern courtyard, which contained the living quarters, including those of the châtelain. Each corner of the wall was probably reinforced with wooden defensive structures, estimated at five. Access was through a gate equipped with échauguettes, and the enclosure extended up to 128 meters from east to west.

Access to the castle was via a path from the village of Bay, which led toward the keep before turning along the eastern side of the enclosure to reach the entrance.

== Possessions ==
The castle belonged to:

- Counts of Geneva, although they remained vassals for this fief to the Counts of Savoy.
  - 1225: Guillaume de Charousse, châtelain in the name of the Counts of Geneva
- 1259: Seized by Peter II of Savoy
  - 1259–1260: Rights transferred to the liegeman Pierre Martin
- 1260 –?: Returned to the Counts of Geneva in exchange for renewed recognition of homage

== Châtellenie of Charousse ==
=== Organization ===
The Château de Charousse served as the seat of a châtellenie, or mandement, directly under the authority of the Count of Geneva in the late 14th and early 15th centuries. The châtellenie was administered by a comital châtelain appointed by the count, who exercised administrative and judicial powers.

The châtellenie of Charousse encompassed the castle itself, the fortified house of La Frasse, the small castle (châtelet) of Le Châtelard, the fortified house of Loisin, and the fortified house of Lucinges (also known as the Tower of Lucinge).

Villages, Parishes, and Fortifications of the Châtellenie of Charousse
Commune	Name	Type	Date (attested)
Passy	Château de Charousse (Charosse)	castle	1259 (attested)
Passy	La Frasse	fortified house	(attested)
Passy	Le Châtelard	small castle (châtelet)	(indication)
Passy	Fortified house of Loisin	fortified house	(attested)
Passy	Fortified house of Lucinges	fortified house	(attested)

In the 17th century, the coat of arms of the mandement was described as a silver cross on a blue field, accompanied by three red pales on a gold background.

=== Châtelains ===
After its incorporation into the County of Savoy from 1401, the châtelain was an officer appointed for a fixed term, with the authority to be revoked or removed. The châtelain was responsible for administering the châtellenie or mandement, collecting fiscal revenues, and maintaining the castle. An accounts' receiver sometimes assisted the châtelain by preparing the annual report submitted by the châtelain or his deputy.

Castellans of Charousse (Charosse) from the 14th to the 16th century
Savoyard administration
- 5 August 1325 – 15 September 1326: Jean de La Rochette
- 1 January 1330 – 11 October 1330: Girard
- 11 October 1330 – 11 November 1332: Pierre de Chissé
- 11 November 1332 – 13 June 1335: Pierre Vuagnard. Girard Trombert, lieutenant for the period from 13 February 1334 to 13 June 1335
- 22 July 1335 – 8 December 1336: Pierre Deloyes
- 1 June 1340 – 11 March 1343: Jacques de Langin
- 13 July 1343 – 16 August 1344: Barthélémy Anier / Asinary, citizen of Asti. Jacques de Monthouz, vice-castellan
- 14 June 1346 – 17 May 1347: Pierre, bastard of Geneva (natural son of Count Guillaume III of Geneva)
- 18 February 1347 – 1 May 1349: Aymonet de Soyry (Soyrier?)
- 16 October 1350 – 1 July 1351: Perceval (Percival) de Chissé
- 1 July 1351 – 25 February 1358: Humbert de la Porte
- 1 January 1359 – 26 June 1362: Jean (I) de Dingy (Pingy [sic]) or Menthon-Dingy, from a cadet branch of the Menthon family, lord of Dingy; also castellan of Ternier (1362–1373), Rumilly-sous-Cornillon (1373–1378)
- 26 June 1362 – 26 March 1371: Pierre de Compois. Pierre de Coudré, lieutenant from 14 May 1370 to 26 March 1371
- 26 March 1371 – 4 June 1387: Jean (I) de Menthon-Dingy (continued). His lieutenants: Peronod Devia (23 April 1373 – 15 June 1374); Pierre Ferrier (3 May 1378 – 15 May 1380); Jean de Monthouz (15 May 1380 – 5 June 1381); Hugues Metral (5 June 1381 – 28 July 1382); Pierre Pachod (28 July 1383 – 18 August 1384) and Hugues Metral (20 July 1385 – 4 June 1387)
- 4 June 1387 – 29 May 1412: Pierre de Menthon-Dingy, son of Jean (I) de Menthon-Dingy
  - 1397–1399: Catherine de Bellegarde, widow of Pierre de Bellegarde, administered the châtellenie of Charousse, held by her husband on behalf of the Count of Savoy
- 29 May 1412 – 15 September 1414: Jacques de Menthon-Dingy, son of Pierre de Menthon-Dingy
- 17 February 1418 – 22 January 1455 (receiver for periods 17 February 1418 – 8 January 1419; 22 January 1427 – 22 January 1428; 22 January 1433 – 22 January 1434; 22 January 1440 – 22 January 1441; 22 January 1449 – 22 January 1450): Guigues de la Ravoire. In 1427, he inherits the rights of Antoine, lord of Hauteville, co-lord of Charousse, for approximately ten years through death without heirs
- 22 January 1455 – 22 January 1465 (receivers for 22 January 1458 – 22 January 1459): François-Jean de Rovorée or Ravorée (sometimes written Ravoire), noble, and his brother Jean (III) de Rovorée or Ravorée (sometimes written Ravoire), lord of Cursinges, sons of Guigues de la Ravoire (co-castellans)
- 7 July 1465 – 22 January 1492 (receiver for 22 January 1466 – 22 January 1467, then 22 January 1487): Eustache de Crans, master-auditor at the Chamber of Accounts of Genevois under Janus of Savoy
- 22 January 1492 – 22 January 1494: Martin Clerc
- 22 January 1494 – 21 January 1502: Jean François, co-lord of Azeglio, grand castellan
- 19 October 1502 – 1 April 1526 (receiver 1 April 1516 – 1 April 1517): Aymon de Rovorée or Ravorée (sometimes written Ravoire), lord of Cursinges

Administration of the apanage of Genevois (1502–1659)

Castellans of Charousse and Passy:

- 1502–1526: Noble Aymon de La Ravoire
- 1 April 1529 – 1 April 1530: Noble François de Coudrée, also vice-castellan and receiver of Charousse
- 1530 – 29 September 1532 – 29 September 1534: Noble Gaspard de Riddes
- 1535: Noble Raymond de Bieu
- 1536–1541: Master (Note: “Master” is a title associated with “procurators, notaries, practitioners, and commissioners.”) or noble Jean-François Fichet
- 1543–1547: Master or noble Jean-François Fichet
- 1548–1553: Master or noble Jean-François Fichet
- 1553–1555: Master François Delagrandmaison
- 1555–1565: Master or noble Jean-François Fichet
- 1565–1568: Noble Claude Daniel
- 1568–1571: Noble Alexandre de Bottollier
- 1571–1577: Noble Aymé Grosset
- 1577–1580: Noble Claude Daniel
- 1580–1586: Noble Guillaume de Menthon de Dingy
- 1586–1592: Noble François du Nyèvre, succeeded by noble Aymé de la Ravoire
- 1592–1598: Noble Bapthozard de Cuppelin (de Cupelin)
- 1598–1604: Noble Jacques Anseney
- 1604–1610: Noble Jean-Jacques de Bongain
- 1610–1616: Masters Aymé Descombes and Nicolas Jay, co-farmers
- 1616–1622: Noble Étienne du Fresney, associated with Master Jean-Pierre Challand (1616)
- 1622–1628: Noble Claude du Coudrey de La Blancheville
- 1628–1634: Noble Louis de Bottollier
- 1634–1640: Noble Louis Berchat
- 1640–1646: Master Jacques Challamel
- 1646–1652: Master Georges Fontannaz
- 1652–1658: Master Nicolas Burnier

== See also ==
- Medieval fortification
- Castle
- Fortification

== Bibliography ==
- Unknown. "Culture, Histoire et Patrimoine de Passy" [Culture, History, and Heritage of Passy]. Vatusium (in French). 9, 12: 5–6, 30, 36.
- Baud, Henri; Mariotte, Jean-Yves; Guerrier, Alain (1980). Histoire des communes savoyardes : Le Faucigny [History of Savoyard municipalities: Le Faucigny] (in French). Roanne: Éditions Horvath. pp. 435–445. ISBN 2-7171-0159-4.
- Blondel, Louis (1956). Châteaux de l'ancien diocèse de Genève [Castles of the former diocese of Geneva]. Mémoires et documents (in French). Vol. 7. Société d'histoire et d'archéologie de Genève. pp. 115–117.
- Dilphy, Dominique (2009). Les châteaux et maisons fortes du Pays du Mont-Blanc [The castles and fortified houses of the Mont Blanc region] (in French). pp. 22–24.
- Dupraz, Pierre (2009). Passy hier et aujourd'hui au Pays du Mont-Blanc [Passy yesterday and today in the Mont Blanc region] (in French). p. 16.
- Dupraz, Pierre (1999). Traditions et évolution de Passy [Traditions and evolution of Passy] (in French). p. 153.
- Payraud, Nicolas (2009). "Châteaux, espace et société en Dauphiné et en Savoie du milieu du XIIIe siècle à la fin du XVe siècle" [Castles, space, and society in Dauphiné and Savoie from the mid-13th century to the end of the 15th century] (PDF). HAL - Archives Ouvertes (in French).
- Soudan, Paul (1978). Au pays du Mont Blanc, histoire de Passy [In the land of Mont Blanc, the history of Passy] (in French). Bonneville: Plancher. pp. 27, 31–32.
- Soudan, Paul (1975). Historique de l'usine de Chedde et du « terroir » de Passy (Haute-Savoie). L'usine de Chedde et l'industrie alpestre [History of the Chedde factory and the Passy region (Haute-Savoie). The Chedde factory and the Alpine industry] (in French). Bonneville: Plancher. pp. 20–21.

=== Archival collections ===
- "M - Fonds la Préfecture (IR1205). - Population (recensements, naturalisations...) (1860-1970)" [M - Prefecture Funds (IR1205). - Population (censuses, naturalizations, etc.) (1860-1970).] (in French). Archived from the original on January 26, 2021.
- "Inventaire-Index des comptes de châtellenie et de subsides" [Inventory-Index of accounts for the castellany and subsidies] (PDF) (in French). pp. 192–202.
