= Arve Valley =

Valley in Haute-Savoie department, France

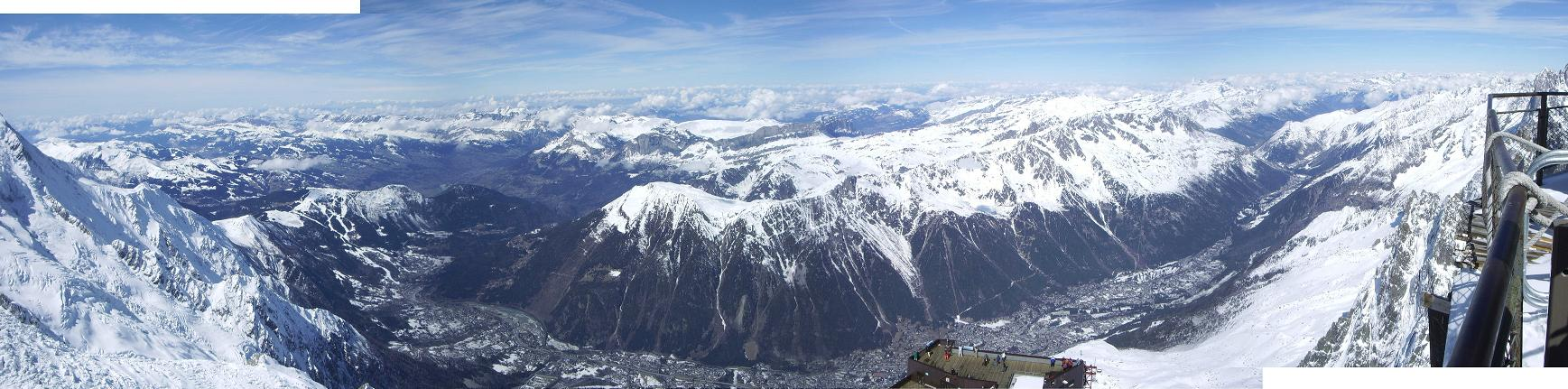
- Upper course of the Arve valley taken from the Aiguille du Midi.
- Length: 105 km (65 mi) North West

Naming
- Native name: La Vallée de L'Arve (French)

Geology
- Type: Glacial valley

Geography
- Country: France
- River: Arve
- Interactive map of Arve Valley

The Arve Valley (La vallée de l'Arve) is an alpine valley located in the French Haute-Savoie department. The namesake of the valley is the river at the bottom: the Arve. The valley as a whole makes up the majority of Faucigny, one of the Natural regions of France, and one of six that make up the Savoie region.

== Geography ==
The Arve Valley consists of the upper reaches of the river Arve, whose source is in the Mont Blanc massif, on the Savoyard Col de Balme side. Downstream, the river passes through the plain of Annemasse, before emptying into the Rhône in the Swiss canton of Geneva.

The valley came into being during the last ice age when the Alpine glaciers extended beyond Geneva.

There is controversy over the true extent of the upper valley. The broadest definition makes the start upstream of Sallanches, including Passy and the valleys of Megève, Montjoie, and Chamonix. This also describes the region of "Mont Blanc country" (Pays du Mont-Blanc).

Some consider the upper valley to only include the valley of Chamonix. This valley stretches, from downstream, through the communes of Servoz, Les Houches, Chamonix-Mont-Blanc and Vallorcine.

== History ==
Historically, the valley was a part of Faucigny, which was ceded to the Count of Savoie during the reign of Amadeus VI in 1355.

== Urbanisation ==
The bottom of the valley is heavily urbanised including the cities/towns of:

- Chamonix (including Les Houches, Servoz, Les Bossons, Argenitière...)
- Sallanches, Passy and Saint-Gervais-les-Bains
- Cluses
- Scionzier
- Bonneville
