= Lac de l'Aiguillette =

Lake in France

- Location within France
- Location: Les Houches, Haute-Savoie
- Coordinates: 45°55′30″N 6°48′40″E
- Basin countries: France

Lac de l'Aiguillette is a lake in Haute-Savoie, France.
