= Servoz station =

Railway station in Servoz, France

Servoz
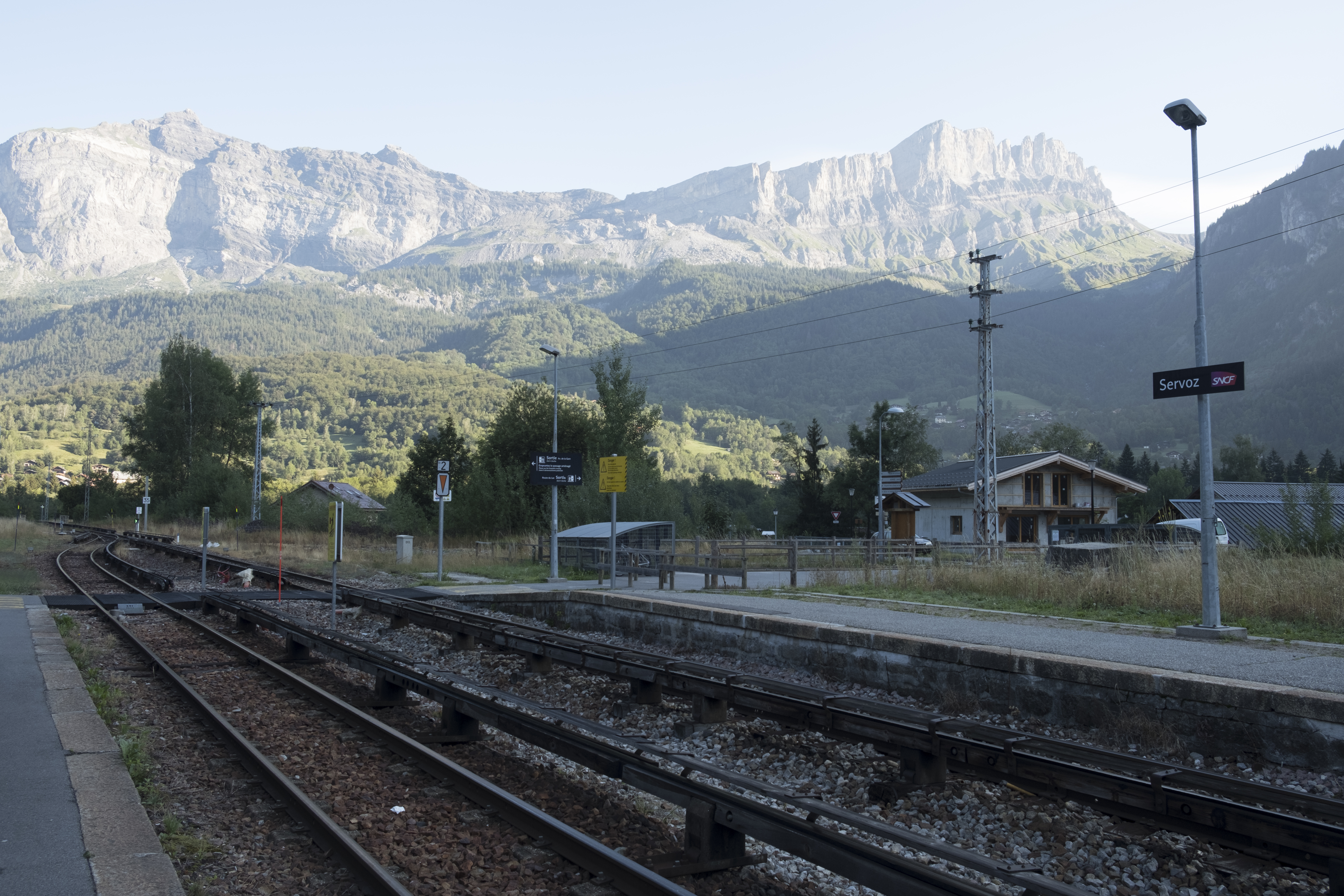
- The station platforms in 2019

General information
- Location: Servoz; France
- Coordinates: 45°55′28″N 6°45′48″E
- Elevation: 812 m (2,664 ft)
- Owner: SNCF
- Line: Saint-Gervais–Vallorcine line
- Distance: 6.8 km (4.2 mi) from Saint-Gervais-les-Bains-Le Fayet
- Train operators: TER Auvergne-Rhône-Alpes
- Connections: Chamonix Bus bus lines

Passengers
- 2019: 9,679 (SNCF)

Services
Preceding station	TER Auvergne-Rhône-Alpes	Following station
Chedde towards Saint-Gervais	44	Vaudagne towards Vallorcine
Location

Servoz station (French: Gare de Servoz) is a railway station in the commune of Les Houches, but near Servoz, in the French department of Haute-Savoie. It is located on the 1,000 mm (3 ft 3 3/8 in) gauge Saint-Gervais–Vallorcine line of SNCF.

== Services ==
As of the December 2020 timetable change, the following services stop at Servoz:

- TER Auvergne-Rhône-Alpes: hourly service between Saint-Gervais-les-Bains-Le Fayet and Vallorcine.
