= Lac Vert (Passy) =

Lake in France

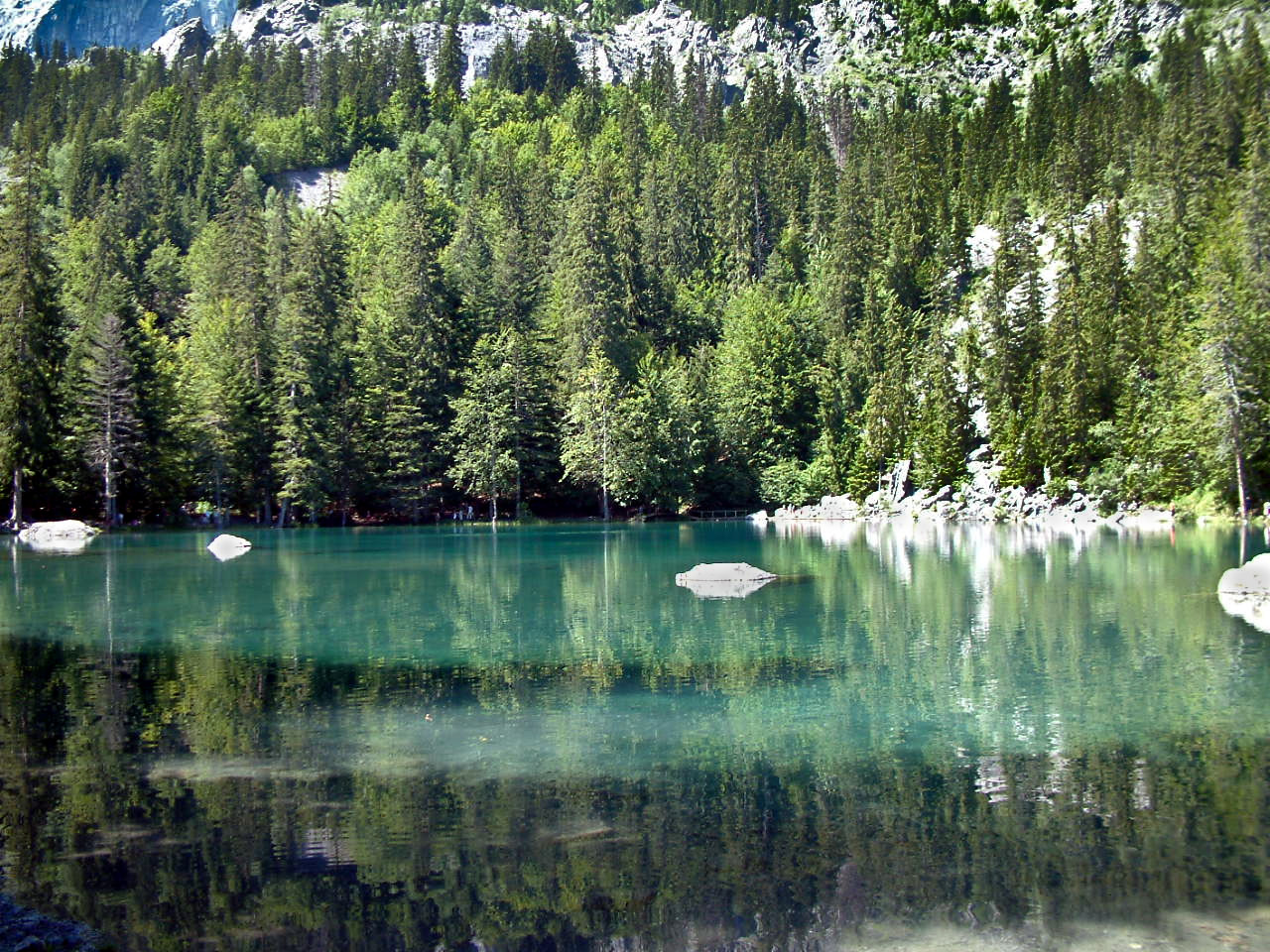

- Location within France
- Location: Passy, Haute-Savoie
- Coordinates: 45°57′00″N 6°45′11″E
- Primary inflows: underground sources
- Catchment area: 1.2 km^{2} (0.46 sq mi)
- Basin countries: France
- Surface area: 8,900 m^{2} (96,000 sq ft)
- Max. depth: 9.3 m (31 ft)
- Water volume: 28,000 m^{3} (990,000 cu ft)
- Surface elevation: 1,266 m (4,154 ft)

Lac Vert is a lake in the municipality of Passy, Haute-Savoie, France.
