= Les Houches station =

Railway station in Les Houches, France

Les Houches
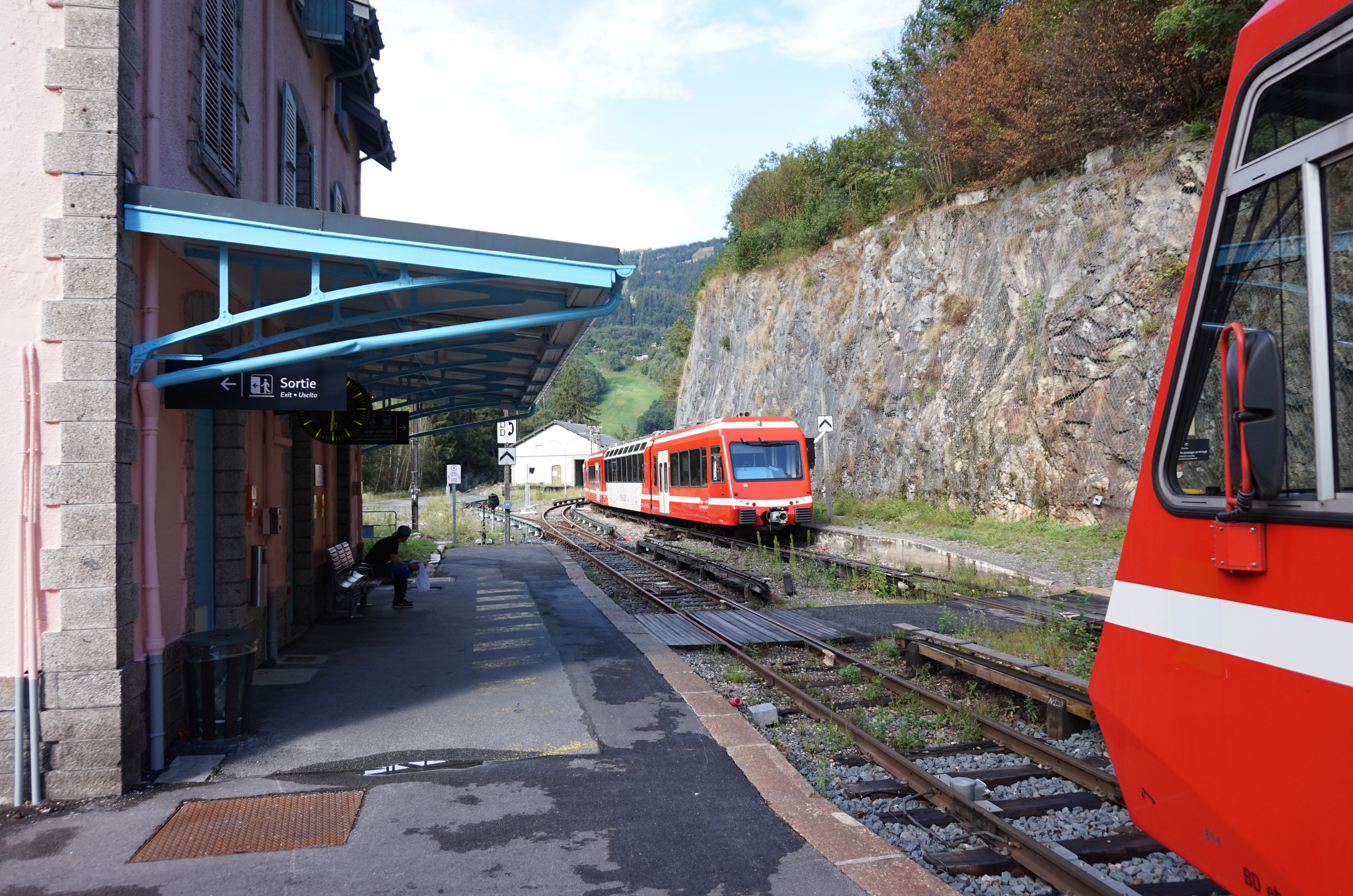
- A train at the station in 2015

General information
- Location: Les Houches; France
- Coordinates: 45°53′37″N 6°47′49″E
- Elevation: 980 m (3,220 ft)
- Owner: SNCF
- Line: Saint-Gervais–Vallorcine line
- Distance: 11.7 km (7.3 mi) from Saint-Gervais-les-Bains-Le Fayet
- Train operators: TER Auvergne-Rhône-Alpes

Passengers
- 2019: 19,061 (SNCF)

Services
Preceding station	TER Auvergne-Rhône-Alpes	Following station
Viaduc-Sainte-Marie towards Saint-Gervais	44	Taconnaz towards Vallorcine
Location

Les Houches station (French: Gare des Houches) is a railway station in the commune of Les Houches, in the French department of Haute-Savoie. It is located on the 1,000 mm (3 ft 3 3/8 in) gauge Saint-Gervais–Vallorcine line of SNCF.

== Services ==
As of the December 2020 timetable change, the following services stop at Les Houches:

- TER Auvergne-Rhône-Alpes: hourly service between Saint-Gervais-les-Bains-Le Fayet and Vallorcine.
