= Viaduc-Sainte-Marie station =

Railway station in Les Houches, France

Viaduc-Sainte-Marie
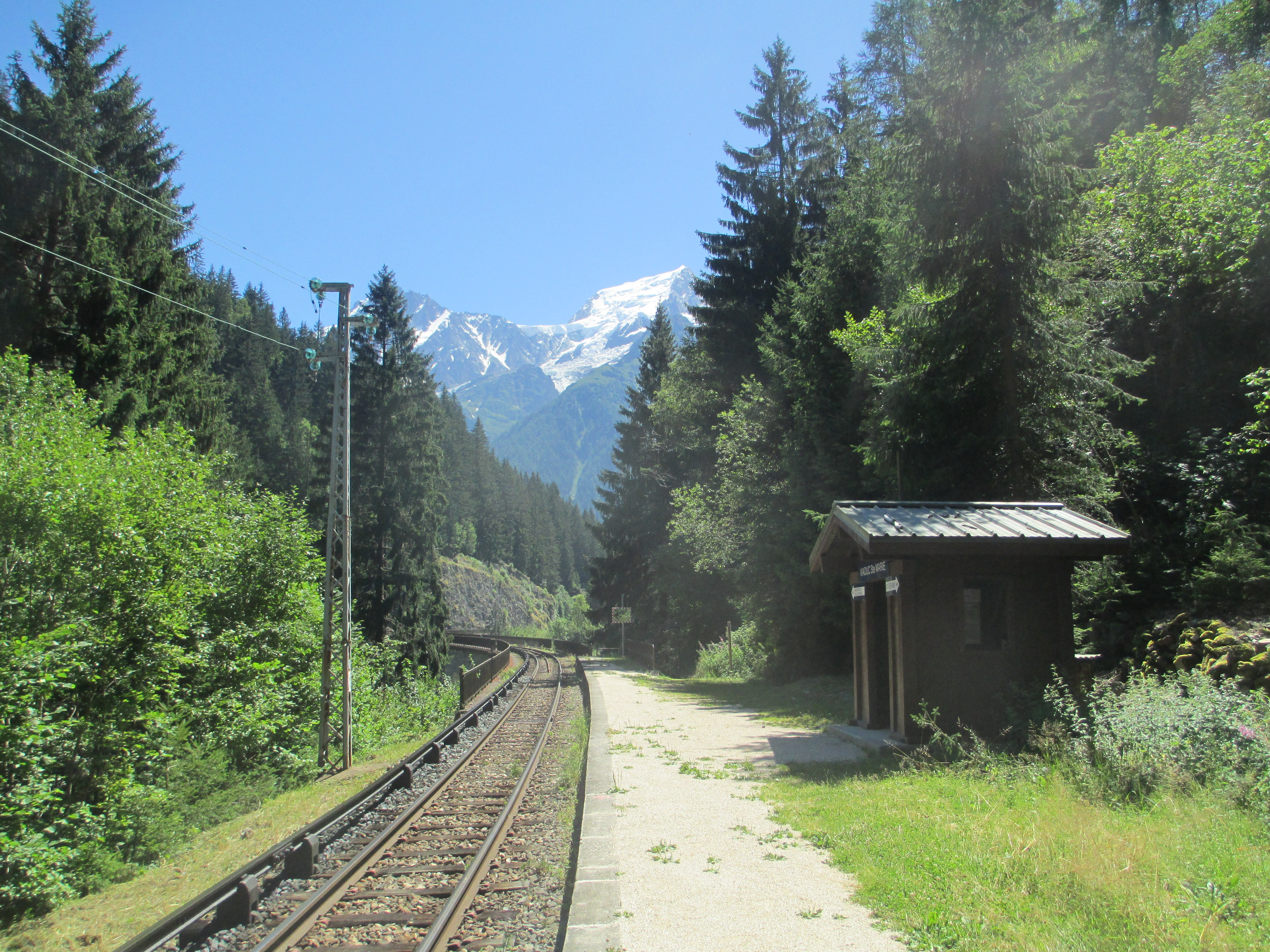
- The station platform in 2013

General information
- Location: Les Houches; France
- Coordinates: 45°53′50″N 6°47′06″E
- Owner: SNCF
- Line: Saint-Gervais–Vallorcine line
- Distance: 10.6 km (6.6 mi) from Saint-Gervais-les-Bains-Le Fayet
- Train operators: TER Auvergne-Rhône-Alpes

Passengers
- 2019: 1,226 (SNCF)

Services
Preceding station	TER Auvergne-Rhône-Alpes	Following station
Vaudagne towards Saint-Gervais	44	Les Houches towards Vallorcine
Location

Viaduc-Sainte-Marie station (French: Gare du Viaduc-Sainte-Marie) is a railway station in the commune of Les Houches, in the French department of Haute-Savoie. It is located on the 1,000 mm (3 ft 3 3/8 in) gauge Saint-Gervais–Vallorcine line of SNCF.

== Services ==
As of the December 2020 timetable change, the following services stop at Viaduc Sainte-Marie:

- TER Auvergne-Rhône-Alpes: hourly service between Saint-Gervais-les-Bains-Le Fayet and Vallorcine.
