= Les Bossons station =

Railway station in Chamonix-Mont-Blanc, France

Les Bossons
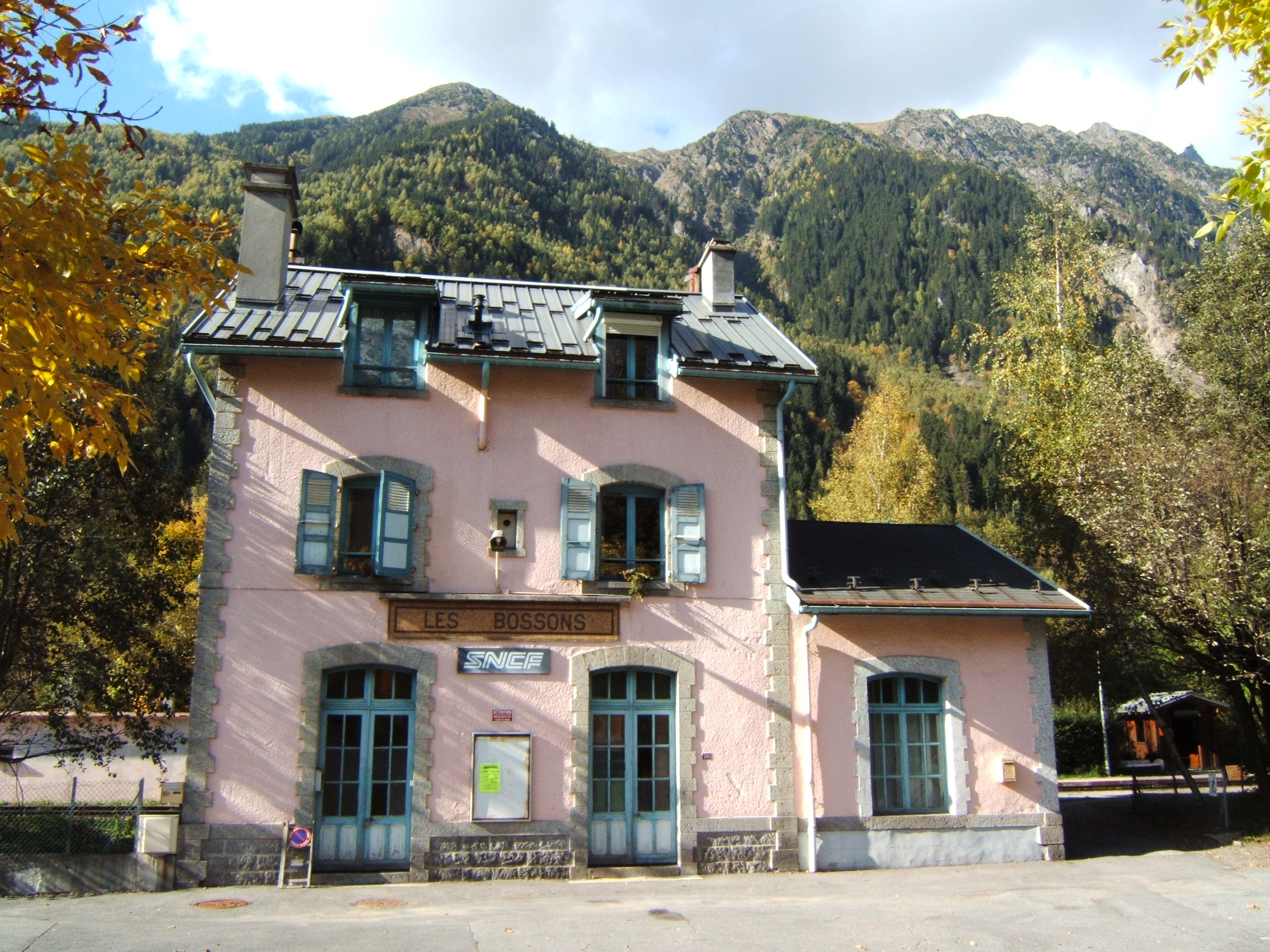
- The station building in 2005

General information
- Location: Chamonix-Mont-Blanc; France
- Coordinates: 45°54′24″N 6°50′21″E
- Elevation: 1,013 m (3,323 ft)
- Owner: SNCF
- Line: Saint-Gervais–Vallorcine line
- Distance: 15.7 km (9.8 mi) from Saint-Gervais-les-Bains-Le Fayet
- Train operators: TER Auvergne-Rhône-Alpes
- Connections: Chamonix Bus bus lines

Passengers
- 2019: 4,044 (SNCF)

Services
Preceding station	TER Auvergne-Rhône-Alpes	Following station
Taconnaz towards Saint-Gervais	44	Les Pélerins towards Vallorcine
Location

Les Bossons station (French: Gare des Bossons) is a railway station in the commune of Chamonix-Mont-Blanc, in the French department of Haute-Savoie. It is located on the 1,000 mm (3 ft 3 3/8 in) gauge Saint-Gervais–Vallorcine line of SNCF.

== Services ==
As of the December 2020 timetable change, the following services stop at Les Bossons:

- TER Auvergne-Rhône-Alpes: hourly service between Saint-Gervais-les-Bains-Le Fayet and Vallorcine.
