= Canton of Le Mont-Blanc =

Administrative division of Haute-Savoie, France

Coordinates: 45.92°N 6.70°E

A map of the canton of Le Mont-Blanc in Haute-Savoie

The canton of Le Mont-Blanc (French: Canton du Mont-Blanc, [kɑ̃tɔ̃ dy mɔ̃blɑ̃]) is an administrative division of the Haute-Savoie department, Southeastern France. It elects two members of the Departmental Council of Haute-Savoie, known as departmental councillors (conseillers départementaux). It was created at the 2014 cantonal reorganisation process, which came into effect for the 2015 departmental election. Its seat is Passy, its most populated commune.

The canton consists of the following communes within the arrondissement of Bonneville, on the border with both Italy and Switzerland:

1. Chamonix-Mont-Blanc
2. Les Contamines-Montjoie
3. Les Houches
4. Passy
5. Saint-Gervais-les-Bains
6. Servoz
7. Vallorcine

The canton of Le Mont-Blanc was created from the former cantons of Chamonix-Mont-Blanc (four communes) and Saint-Gervais-les-Bains (three communes). It was named after Mont Blanc.
