= Chedde station =

Railway station in Haute-Savoie, France

Chedde
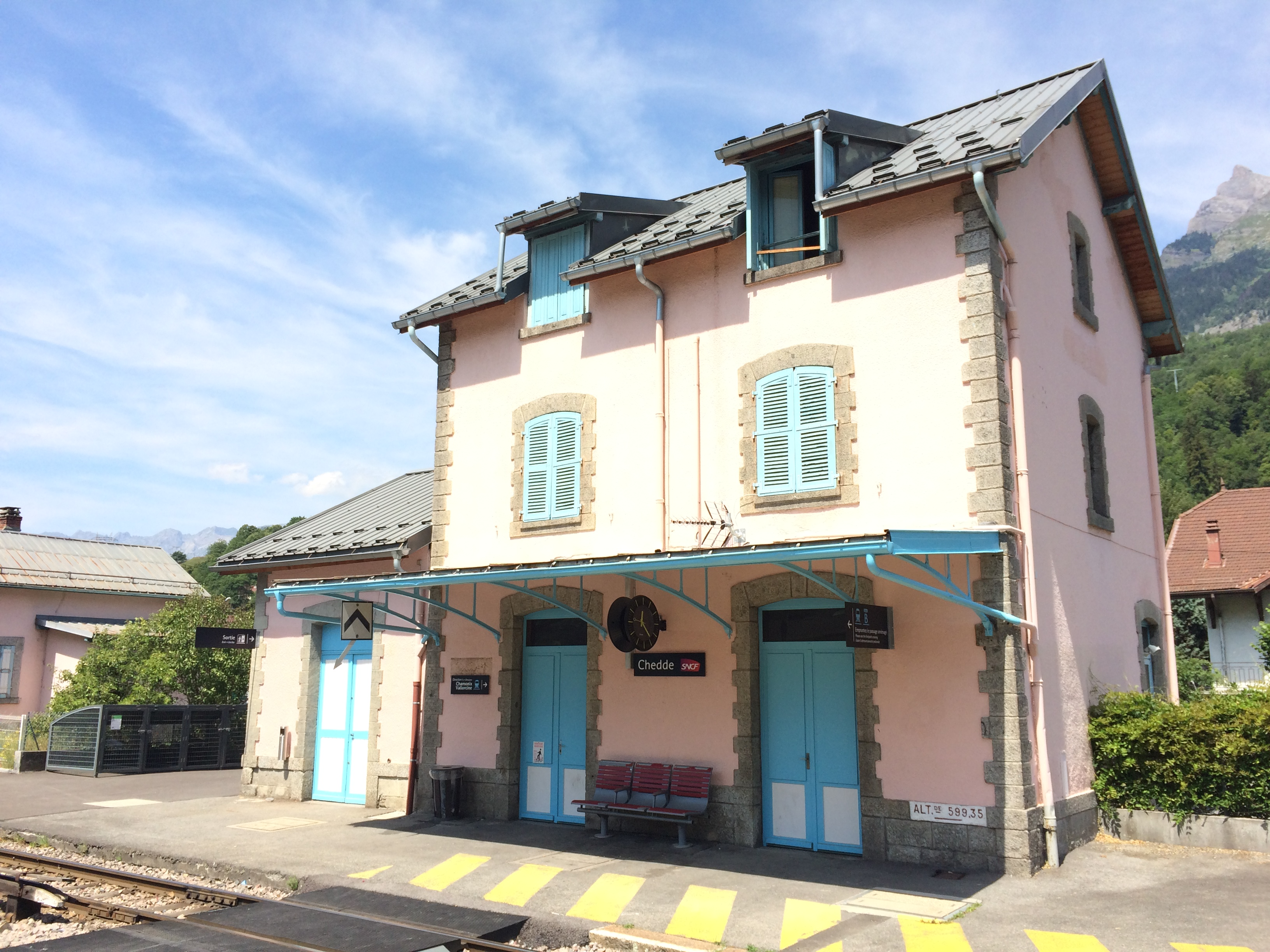
- The station building in 2015

General information
- Location: Passy; France
- Coordinates: 45°55′35″N 6°43′11″E
- Elevation: 599 m (1,965 ft)
- Owner: SNCF
- Line: Saint-Gervais–Vallorcine line
- Distance: 2.7 km (1.7 mi) from Saint-Gervais-les-Bains-Le Fayet
- Train operators: TER Auvergne-Rhône-Alpes

Passengers
- 2019: 20,478 (SNCF)

Services
Preceding station	TER Auvergne-Rhône-Alpes	Following station
Saint-Gervais Terminus	44	Servoz towards Vallorcine
Location

Chedde station (French: Gare de Chedde) is a railway station in the commune of Passy, in the French department of Haute-Savoie. It is located on the 1,000 mm (3 ft 3 3/8 in) gauge Saint-Gervais–Vallorcine line of SNCF.

== Services ==
As of the December 2020 timetable change, the following services stop at Chedde:

- TER Auvergne-Rhône-Alpes: hourly service between Saint-Gervais-les-Bains-Le Fayet and Vallorcine.
