= Samuel Guichenon =

French lawyer, historian and genealogist

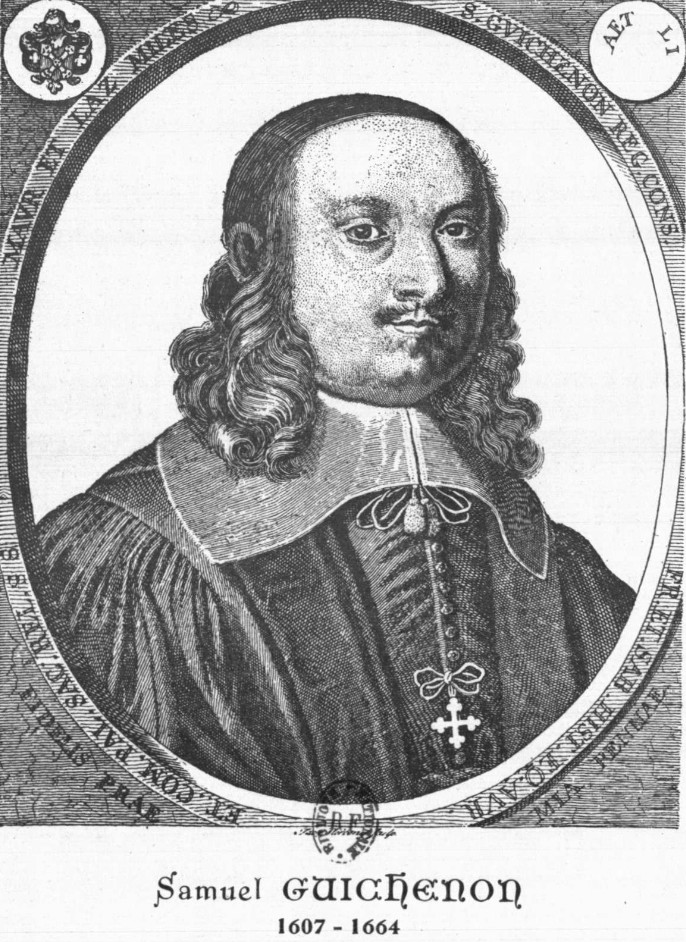
Guichenon

Samuel Guichenon (18 August 1607, Mâcon - 8 September 1664) was a French lawyer, historian and genealogist.

== Life ==
He was one of three sons born to Grégoire Guichenon and Claudine Chaussat, a Calvinist family originating in Châtillon-les-Dombes. His father was a surgeon at Bourg-en-Bresse and his mother was the daughter of a rich merchant from Bourg-en-Bresse, but they settled in Mâcon to be closer to the Protestant community at Pont-de-Veyle. He had an active adolescence "with prodigious humour and a tender heart" and studied law in Annonay before completing his doctorate in Lyon.

Under the influence of an old clergyman from Bourg-en-Bresse, following a trip to Italy and a dream about Francis of Assisi, Samuel renounced Calvinism and converted to Catholicism in 1630. He began studying judicial law and became a lawyer in Bourg-en-Bresse. He married three times - one of these was to a rich widow, whose wealth allowed him to devote himself completely to his historical research. In 1650 he published his Histoire de la Bresse et du Bugey but he refused to edit the "Histoire de la Dombes" in the way Vaugelas wished, since this would involve justifying France's annexation of this project and bias the work. Also in 1650 he was made dynastic historian to the House of Savoy (then under the regency of Christine of France until her son Charles Emmanuel II came of age) and to write a History of the Estates of Savoy he moved to Turin. In 1651 he was made a count palatine by Ferdinand III, Holy Roman Emperor - he was also a knight of the Holy Roman Empire.

He displeased the House of Savoy by disputing traditional chroniclers and disproving its hereditary rights to several lost territories such as Geneva and Cyprus. He clarified certain obscure points in its history and revealed some well-kept secrets, which led to many polemical disputes with other historians. Finally, under pressure, he recognized the House's traditional claim to Saxon origins and a dynastic link with the Holy Roman Emperor and endorsed the Duke of Savoy's policy of regional expansion towards Italy and of renouncing its claims to lands in western Europe which were too difficult to capture or hold onto due to French pressure.

In 1658 Louis XIV ennobled Guichenon and made him official historian of France. His Histoire généalogique de la Royale Maison de Savoie was published in Lyon in 1660 and presented to Christine of France - it marked the start of a new age in history-writing in which research was founded on the authenticity of sources and rational study. He was awarded the Cross of Saint Maurice. Never published, his last work was Le Soleil en son apogée, a panegyric of Christine, edited during the last months of his life. He is buried in the église des Jacobins at Bourg-en-Bresse. He was highly thought of until the end of the 18th century.

== Works ==
- Histoire de la Bresse et du Bugey (1650).
- Le Soleil en son Apogée ou Histoire de Chrestienne de France, Duchesse de Savoie, Princesse de Piémont, Reyne de Chypre (1664)
- Histoire généalogique de la Royale Maison de Savoie ou Histoire généalogique de la Royale Maison de Savoie justifiée par titres, fondations de monastères, manuscrits, anciens monumens, histoires, et autres preuves authentiques, published by Jean-Michel Briolo (1660)
- Bibliotheca Sébusiana, published by Jean-Michel Briolo (1660)
- Episcopum Bellicensium chronologica series (1642)
- Histoire de la souveraineté de la Dombes
  - Volume 1
  - Volume 2

== Sources ==
- (in French) Ferdinand Hoefer, Nouvelle biographie générale depuis les temps les plus reculés jusqu’à nos jours, avec les renseignements bibliographiques et l’indication des sources à consulter, Paris, Firmin-Didot frères, 1853-70. 46 volumes, p. 537
- (in French) E. Haag, La France Protestante, ou Vies des protestants français qui se sont fait un nom dans l’histoire, Paris, Joùel Cherbuliez, 1846-1858
