= Servoz =

Servoz Sarvô (Savoyard)
- Commune
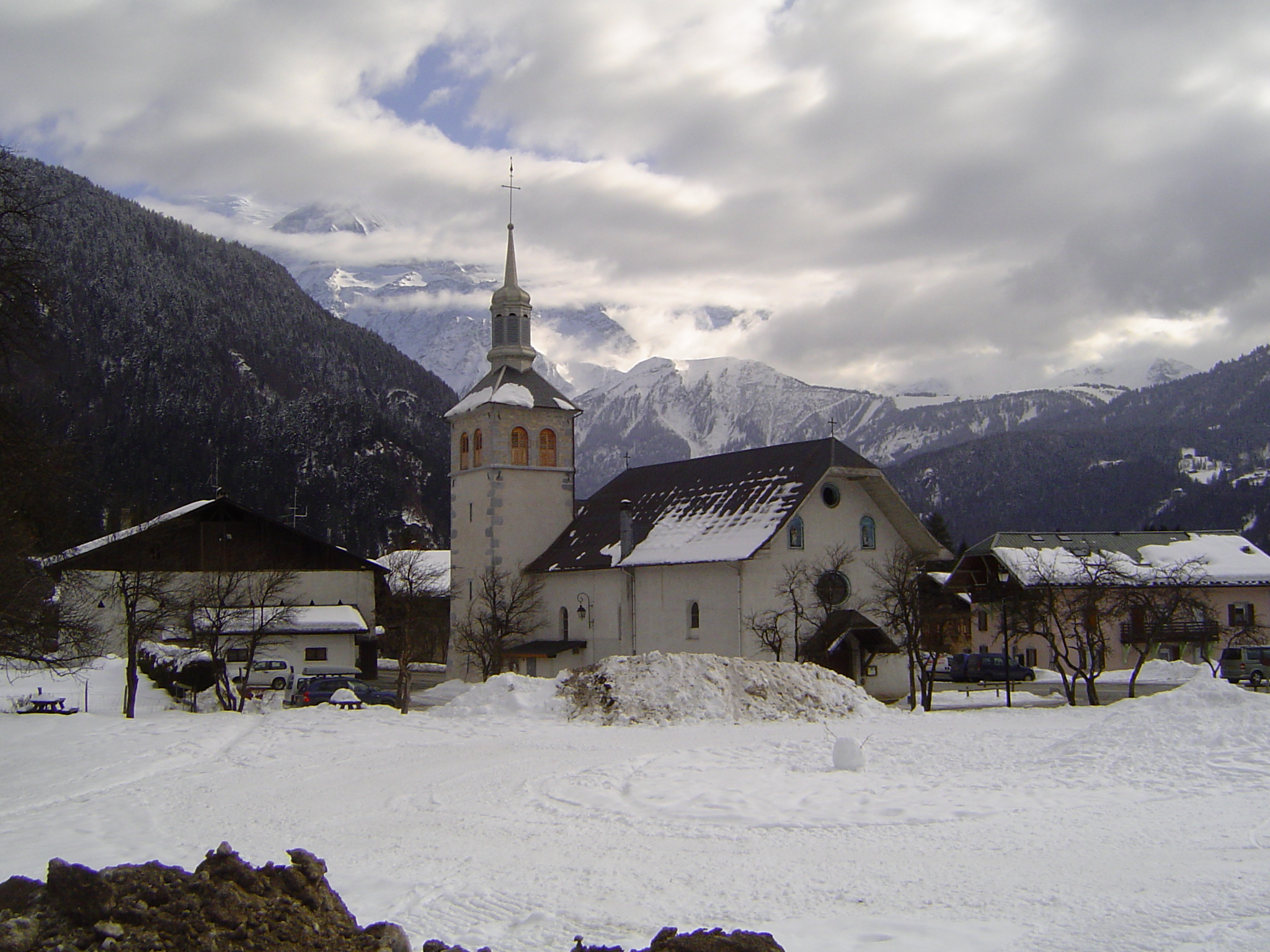
- The church in Servoz
- Location of Servoz
- Location within France Location within Auvergne-Rhône-Alpes
- Coordinates: 45°55′57″N 6°45′46″E
- Country: France
- Region: Auvergne-Rhône-Alpes
- Department: Haute-Savoie
- Arrondissement: Bonneville
- Canton: Le Mont-Blanc
- Intercommunality: Vallée de Chamonix-Mont-Blanc

Government
  - Mayor (2020–2026): Nicolas Évrard
- Area^{1}: 13.47 km^{2} (5.20 sq mi)
- Highest elevation: 2,324 m (7,625 ft)
- Lowest elevation: 758 m (2,487 ft)
- Population (2023): 1,169
  - Density: 86.79/km^{2} (224.8/sq mi)
- Time zone: UTC+01:00 (CET)
  - Summer (DST): UTC+02:00 (CEST)
- INSEE/Postal code: 74266 /74310
- ^{1} French Land Register data, which excludes lakes, ponds, glaciers > 1 km^{2} (0.386 sq mi or 247 acres) and river estuaries.

Servoz (Franco-Provençal pronunciation: [ˈsɛr.vo]; Savoyard: Sarvô), but pronounced by inhabitants, and people of the region, by sounding the terminal “z”, is a commune in the Haute-Savoie department in the Auvergne-Rhône-Alpes region in south-eastern France.

Servoz has a railway station on the Saint-Gervais–Vallorcine railway and the section between Les Houches and Servoz holds the world record gradient for an adhesion railway at a 9% gradient over a distance of 2,000 m (6,562 ft).

== Climate ==
On average, Servoz experiences 111.6 days per year with a minimum temperature below 0 °C (32.0 °F), 8.8 days per year with a minimum temperature below −10 °C (14.0 °F), 10.9 days per year with a maximum temperature below 0 °C (32.0 °F), and 17.4 days per year with a maximum temperature above 30 °C (86.0 °F). The record high temperature was 37.8 °C (100.0 °F) on 11 July 2023, while the record low temperature was −21.3 °C (−6.3 °F) on 5 February 2012.

Climate data for Servoz (1991–2020 normals, extremes 1992–present)
Month	Jan	Feb	Mar	Apr	May	Jun	Jul	Aug	Sep	Oct	Nov	Dec	Year
Record high °C (°F)	17.8 (64.0)	21.6 (70.9)	24.1 (75.4)	27.4 (81.3)	33.3 (91.9)	36.7 (98.1)	37.8 (100.0)	37.0 (98.6)	32.3 (90.1)	29.1 (84.4)	25.1 (77.2)	16.6 (61.9)	37.8 (100.0)
Mean daily maximum °C (°F)	4.7 (40.5)	6.9 (44.4)	11.9 (53.4)	16.1 (61.0)	20.1 (68.2)	24.2 (75.6)	26.0 (78.8)	25.5 (77.9)	20.8 (69.4)	16.0 (60.8)	9.1 (48.4)	4.6 (40.3)	15.5 (59.9)
Daily mean °C (°F)	0.3 (32.5)	1.6 (34.9)	5.7 (42.3)	9.4 (48.9)	13.5 (56.3)	17.2 (63.0)	19.1 (66.4)	18.7 (65.7)	14.6 (58.3)	10.5 (50.9)	4.6 (40.3)	0.8 (33.4)	9.7 (49.4)
Mean daily minimum °C (°F)	−4.1 (24.6)	−3.6 (25.5)	−0.5 (31.1)	2.8 (37.0)	6.9 (44.4)	10.3 (50.5)	12.1 (53.8)	11.9 (53.4)	8.5 (47.3)	5.0 (41.0)	0.2 (32.4)	−3.1 (26.4)	3.9 (38.9)
Record low °C (°F)	−18.3 (−0.9)	−21.3 (−6.3)	−16.0 (3.2)	−6.8 (19.8)	−3.2 (26.2)	−1.1 (30.0)	4.0 (39.2)	1.4 (34.5)	−1.0 (30.2)	−6.7 (19.9)	−12.7 (9.1)	−17.5 (0.5)	−21.3 (−6.3)
Average precipitation mm (inches)	138.0 (5.43)	106.3 (4.19)	107.0 (4.21)	104.8 (4.13)	132.5 (5.22)	123.3 (4.85)	127.7 (5.03)	127.1 (5.00)	100.4 (3.95)	110.8 (4.36)	115.9 (4.56)	152.0 (5.98)	1,445.8 (56.91)
Average precipitation days (≥ 1.0 mm)	10.8	9.4	9.6	10.2	13.3	12.1	11.5	11.8	10.1	10.5	10.3	11.2	130.8
Source: Meteociel

== See also ==
- Communes of the Haute-Savoie department
