= Passy, Haute-Savoie =

Passy Pachi (Savoyard)
- Commune
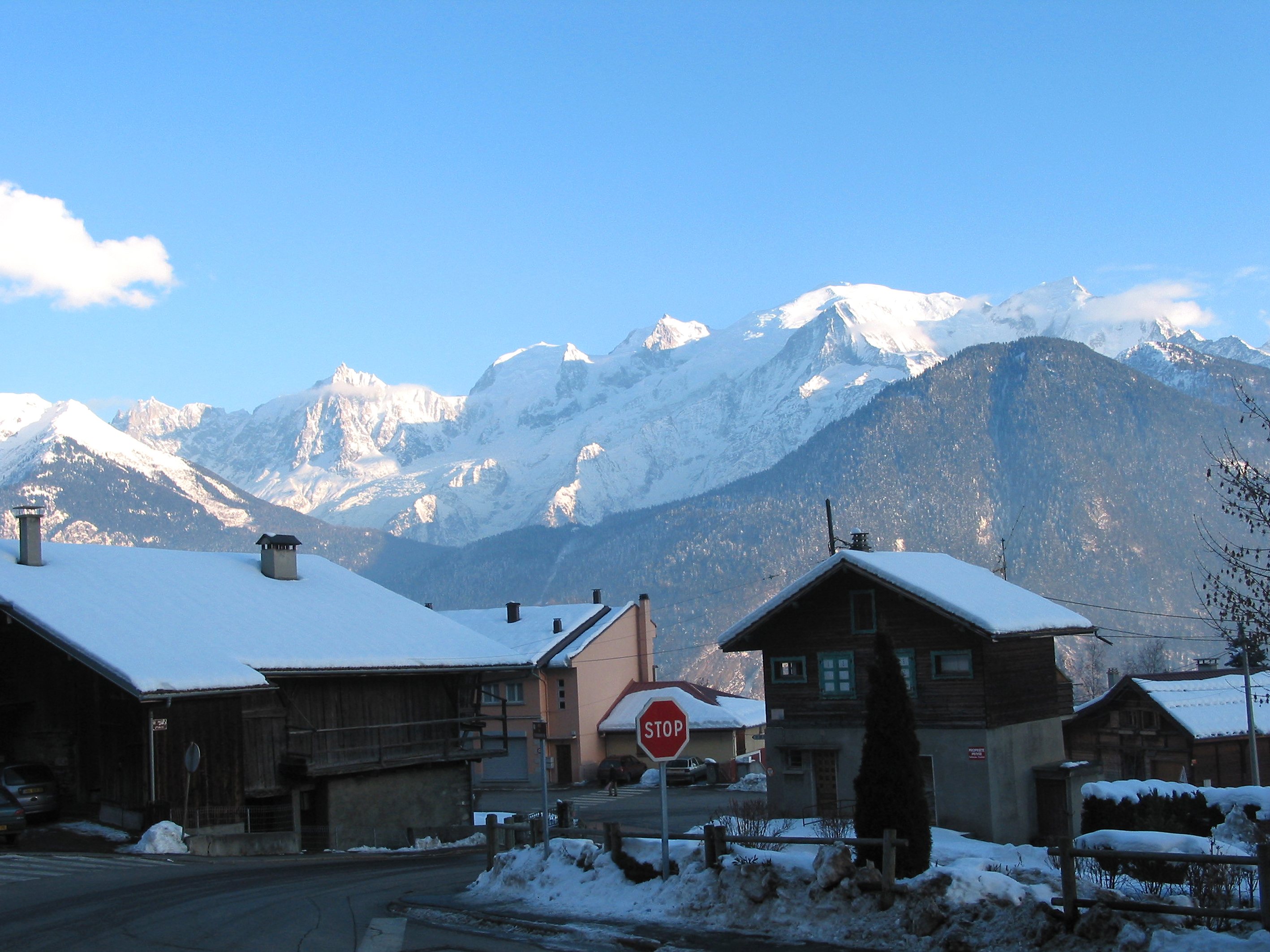
- A view of Mont Blanc from the village

- Coat of arms
- Location of Passy
- Location within France Location within Auvergne-Rhône-Alpes
- Coordinates: 45°55′28″N 6°41′14″E
- Country: France
- Region: Auvergne-Rhône-Alpes
- Department: Haute-Savoie
- Arrondissement: Bonneville
- Canton: Le Mont-Blanc
- Intercommunality: Pays du Mont-Blanc

Government
  - Mayor (2020–2026): Raphaël Castéra
- Area^{1}: 80.03 km^{2} (30.90 sq mi)
- Highest elevation: 2,880 m (9,450 ft)
- Lowest elevation: 542 m (1,778 ft)
- Population (2023): 10,856
  - Density: 135.6/km^{2} (351.3/sq mi)
- Demonym: Passerand / Passerande
- Time zone: UTC+01:00 (CET)
  - Summer (DST): UTC+02:00 (CEST)
- INSEE/Postal code: 74208 /74190
- Website: www.ville-passy-mont-blanc.fr
- ^{1} French Land Register data, which excludes lakes, ponds, glaciers > 1 km^{2} (0.386 sq mi or 247 acres) and river estuaries.

Passy (French pronunciation: [pasi]; Savoyard: Pachi) is a commune in the Haute-Savoie department in the Auvergne-Rhône-Alpes region in south-eastern France. It is part of the urban area of Sallanches.

Located there is the Sancellemoz sanatorium, where Professor Marie Skłodowska-Curie died in 1934.

Lac Vert is located in the commune. The commune has a railway station, Chedde, on the Saint-Gervais–Vallorcine line.

On 4 July 1934, at the age of 66, Marie Curie died due to Aplastic anaemia here.

== Demographics ==
Historical population
| Year | Pop. | ±% p.a. |
|---|---|---|
| 1968 | 8,891 | — |
| 1975 | 8,554 | −0.55% |
| 1982 | 8,722 | +0.28% |
| 1990 | 9,235 | +0.72% |
| 1999 | 10,104 | +1.00% |
| 2007 | 11,144 | +1.23% |
| 2012 | 11,214 | +0.13% |
| 2017 | 10,902 | −0.56% |
| 2023 | 10,856 | −0.07% |
Source: INSEE

== See also ==
- Communes of the Haute-Savoie department
