= Les Houches =

Les Houches Les Ouches (Arpitan)
- Commune
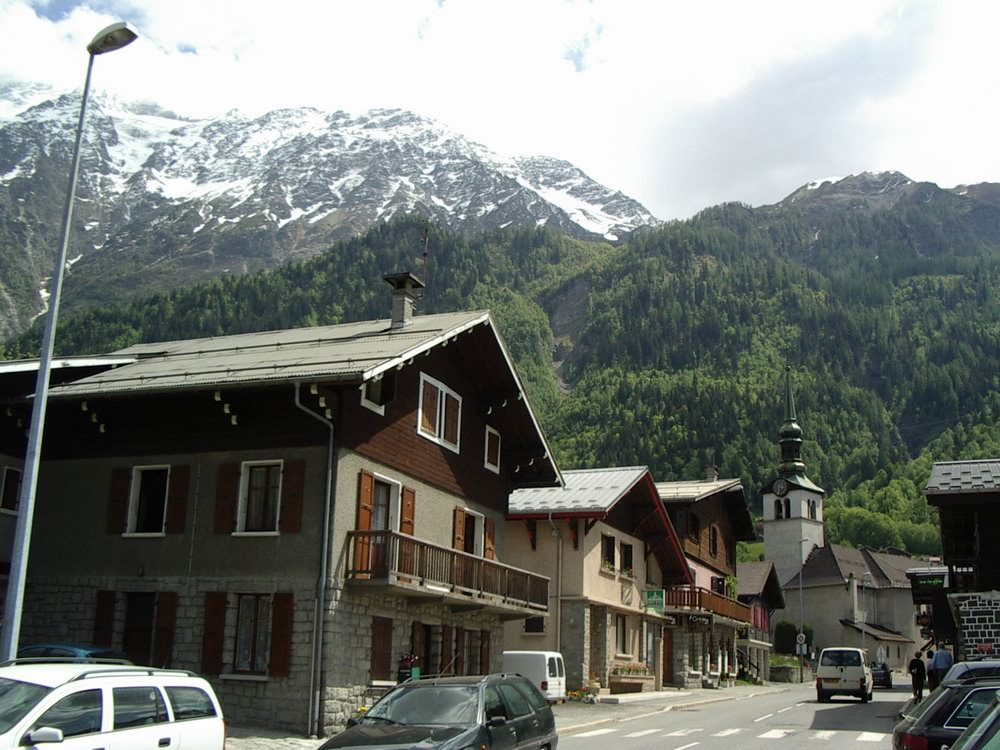
- Les Houches: the village centre

- Coat of arms
- Location of Les Houches
- Location within France Location within Auvergne-Rhône-Alpes
- Coordinates: 45°53′27″N 6°47′57″E
- Country: France
- Region: Auvergne-Rhône-Alpes
- Department: Haute-Savoie
- Arrondissement: Bonneville
- Canton: Le Mont-Blanc
- Intercommunality: CC de la Vallée de Chamonix-Mont-Blanc

Government
  - Mayor (2020–2026): Ghislaine Bossonney
- Area^{1}: 43.07 km^{2} (16.63 sq mi)
- Elevation: 1,008 m (3,307 ft)
- Highest elevation: 1,950 m (6,400 ft)
- Lowest elevation: 796 m (2,612 ft)
- Population (2023): 3,515
  - Density: 81.61/km^{2} (211.4/sq mi)
- Demonym: Houchards
- Time zone: UTC+01:00 (CET)
  - Summer (DST): UTC+02:00 (CEST)
- INSEE/Postal code: 74143 /74310
- Website: www.leshouches.fr
- ^{1} French Land Register data, which excludes lakes, ponds, glaciers > 1 km^{2} (0.386 sq mi or 247 acres) and river estuaries.

Les Houches (French pronunciation: [le.z‿uʃ]; Arpitan: Les Ouches or Les Oucies) is an alpine commune in the Haute-Savoie department in the Auvergne-Rhône-Alpes region in Southeastern France. It is located just west of Chamonix-Mont-Blanc, in the larger canton of Le Mont-Blanc.

== Overview ==
Les Houches, located 6 kilometres from Chamonix, is a ski resort with a domain which extends from an altitude of 950 metres up to 1900 metres. Long descents through tree-lined slopes are combined with impressive views of the Mont Blanc massif and the Chamonix valley.

Les Houches used to be twinned with the Russian village of Krasnaya Polyana (Sochi) and was chosen by the International Olympic Committee to assist in the organization of the 2014 Winter Olympic Games.

Les Houches is the starting- and finishing-point of the popular Tour du Mont Blanc, a 7- to 10-day hike around the base of the Mont-Blanc Massif which takes in France, Italy, and Switzerland.

Les Houches has four railway stations (Taconnaz, Les Houches, Viaduc-Sainte-Marie, and Vaudagne) on the Saint-Gervais–Vallorcine railway and the section from Les Houches to Servoz holds the world record gradient for an adhesion railway at a 9% gradient over a distance of 2,000 m (6,562 ft).

On average, Les Houches experiences 136.4 days per year with a minimum temperature below 0 °C (32.0 °F), 16.0 days per year with a minimum temperature below −10 °C (14.0 °F), 33.1 days per year with a maximum temperature below 0 °C (32.0 °F), and 5.7 days per year with a maximum temperature above 30 °C (86.0 °F). The record high temperature was 35.4 °C (95.7 °F) on 11 July 2023, while the record low temperature was −22.1 °C (−7.8 °F) on 5 February 2012.

Climate data for Les Houches, 1004m (1991–2020 normals, extremes 1991–present)
Month	Jan	Feb	Mar	Apr	May	Jun	Jul	Aug	Sep	Oct	Nov	Dec	Year
Record high °C (°F)	12.5 (54.5)	18.1 (64.6)	23.0 (73.4)	25.5 (77.9)	31.5 (88.7)	34.8 (94.6)	35.4 (95.7)	34.5 (94.1)	29.0 (84.2)	25.0 (77.0)	20.1 (68.2)	14.5 (58.1)	35.4 (95.7)
Mean daily maximum °C (°F)	1.2 (34.2)	5.0 (41.0)	9.8 (49.6)	14.0 (57.2)	18.0 (64.4)	21.8 (71.2)	23.9 (75.0)	23.4 (74.1)	18.8 (65.8)	14.1 (57.4)	6.9 (44.4)	0.7 (33.3)	13.1 (55.6)
Daily mean °C (°F)	−2.2 (28.0)	0.1 (32.2)	4.1 (39.4)	8.0 (46.4)	12.1 (53.8)	15.6 (60.1)	17.5 (63.5)	17.0 (62.6)	13.2 (55.8)	9.0 (48.2)	3.0 (37.4)	−2.0 (28.4)	8.0 (46.3)
Mean daily minimum °C (°F)	−5.6 (21.9)	−4.8 (23.4)	−1.5 (29.3)	2.0 (35.6)	6.1 (43.0)	9.4 (48.9)	11.1 (52.0)	10.7 (51.3)	7.5 (45.5)	3.9 (39.0)	−0.9 (30.4)	−4.6 (23.7)	2.8 (37.0)
Record low °C (°F)	−19.0 (−2.2)	−22.1 (−7.8)	−16.0 (3.2)	−7.0 (19.4)	−3.8 (25.2)	−1.5 (29.3)	3.0 (37.4)	0.5 (32.9)	−1.5 (29.3)	−7.0 (19.4)	−13.0 (8.6)	−19.0 (−2.2)	−22.1 (−7.8)
Average precipitation mm (inches)	97.2 (3.83)	77.3 (3.04)	77.8 (3.06)	86.8 (3.42)	121.6 (4.79)	122.1 (4.81)	121.1 (4.77)	125.7 (4.95)	96.9 (3.81)	101.4 (3.99)	93.7 (3.69)	111.1 (4.37)	1,232.7 (48.53)
Average precipitation days (≥ 1.0 mm)	9.8	8.5	9.4	9.9	13.1	12.1	11.2	11.7	9.4	10.0	10.0	10.3	125.4
Source: Meteociel

== Population ==
Historical population
Year	Pop.	±% p.a.
1968	1,243	—
1975	1,474	+2.46%
1982	1,766	+2.62%
1990	1,947	+1.23%
1999	2,706	+3.73%
2007	3,060	+1.55%
2012	2,967	−0.62%
2017	2,943	−0.16%
2023	3,515	+3.00%
Source: INSEE

== Skiing ==
The Les Houches pistes are regularly used for international events, most notably the 'Kandahar' run, which is used annually for the Men's Downhill World Cup Ski Championships. Les Houches provides a training ground for the French National Ski Team and the Ski Club of Great Britain. The skiing area consists of one international black run, 12 red runs, five blue runs, and four green runs as well as cross-country trails and two snow parks. It is served by one cable car (Bellevue), one gondola lift (Prarion), eight chair lifts (all four-person), three drag lifts, a rope pull and a moving carpet, as well as two further drag lifts in the "Le Tourchet" village-centre ski area.

Extensive artificial snow coverage is provided by a new network of 67 snow canons covering 19 hectares. There are nursery slopes at Le Tourchet in the centre of the village itself, a Jardin du Neige for very young children skiers next to Lac de Chavants, and a new nursery area at the top of the Prarion lift.

== École de Physique des Houches ==
The village is home to a famous physics summer school (the Les Houches School of Physics), founded by Cécile DeWitt-Morette. It has been attended by two dozen Nobel prize laureates, either as teachers or as students before they received their prizes. Additionally, the Les Houches Accords, which are important in high energy physics, were written here.

== Coupeau and La Flatière ==
Opposite Les Houches (across the River Arve, but forming part of the commune) is the small village of Coupeau. A circuitous road climbs high through the village and leads for some three miles all the way up to the foot of its own mountain, l'Aiguillette, at the foot of which lies another small village, La Flatière, well known across the valley for its panoramic views, and a little Christian hermitage. From here many paths wander through the mountains. One scenic path leads to an old sheepfold, called Chailloux.

Coupeau has sun all year round, whereas Les Houches for the most part, remains in the shade in the winter. At the heart of the village of Coupeau is the Merlet animal park, which draws many visitors each year. Here visitors can see llamas as well as local types of deer, rams, and marmots. Below the animal park, a four-storey high statue of Jesus Christ overlooks the valley, its right arm outstretched as if greeting newcomers entering the valley below.

== Sister town ==
- Krasnaya Polyana, Sochi, Russia (until 2024)

== Notable people ==
- Itamar Biran (born 1998) – Israeli Olympic alpine ski racer, lives and trains in Les Houches.
- Professor Jean Delumeau, historian, stays frequently in Les Houches, where he practises mountaineering.
- Catherine Destivelle, mountaineer.
- Marie Paradis (1778–1839), the first woman to climb Mont Blanc (in July 1808).

== Sights and attractions ==
- The Bellevue chair lift (entered service in 1936)
- The Statue of Jesus Christ (inaugurated 19 August 1934)
- The Musée Montagnard, housed in an 18th-century building, which has as its theme of the traditional mountain habitat

== Gallery ==
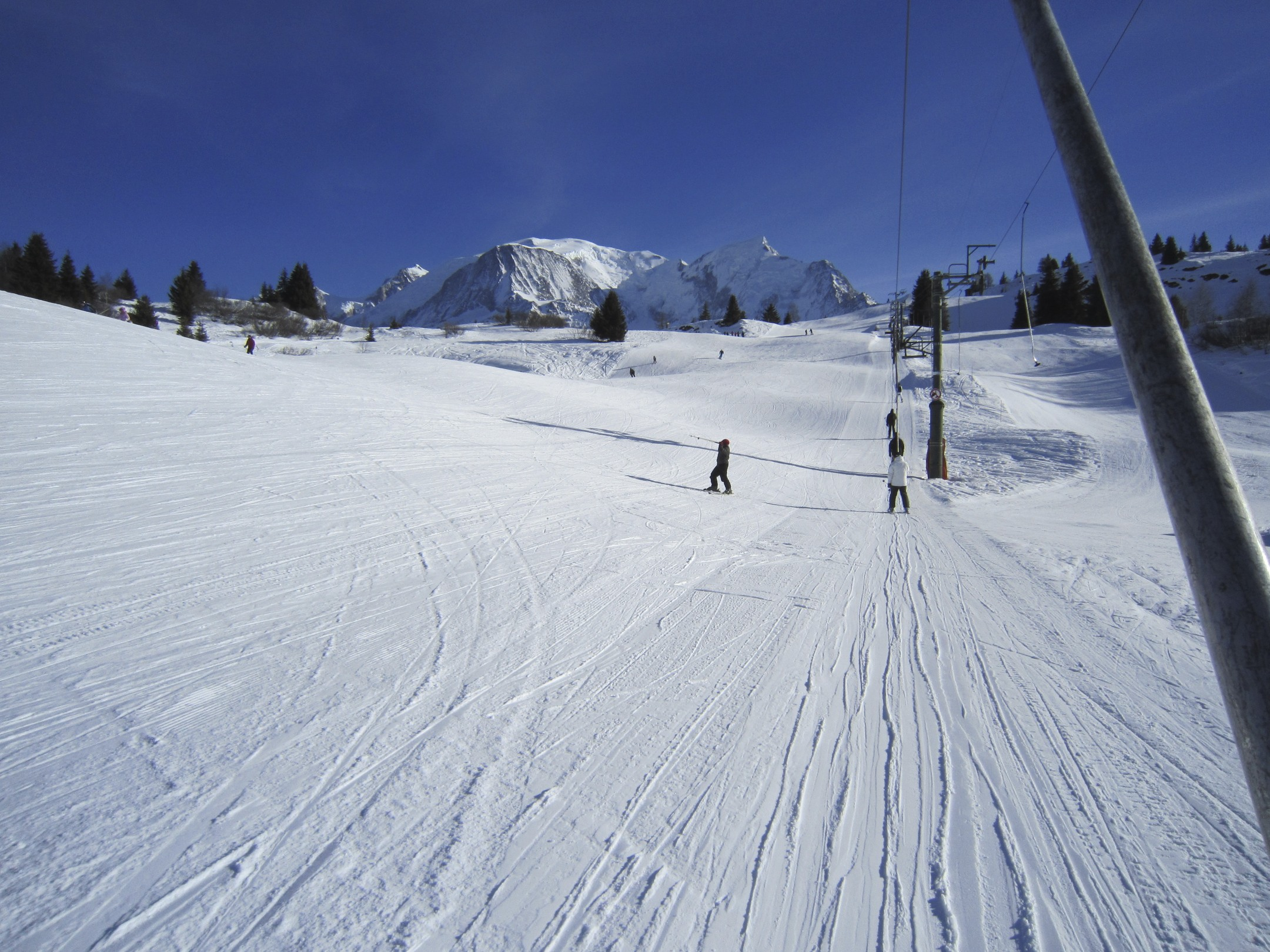
Old Poma drag lift at Les Houches (no longer in use)

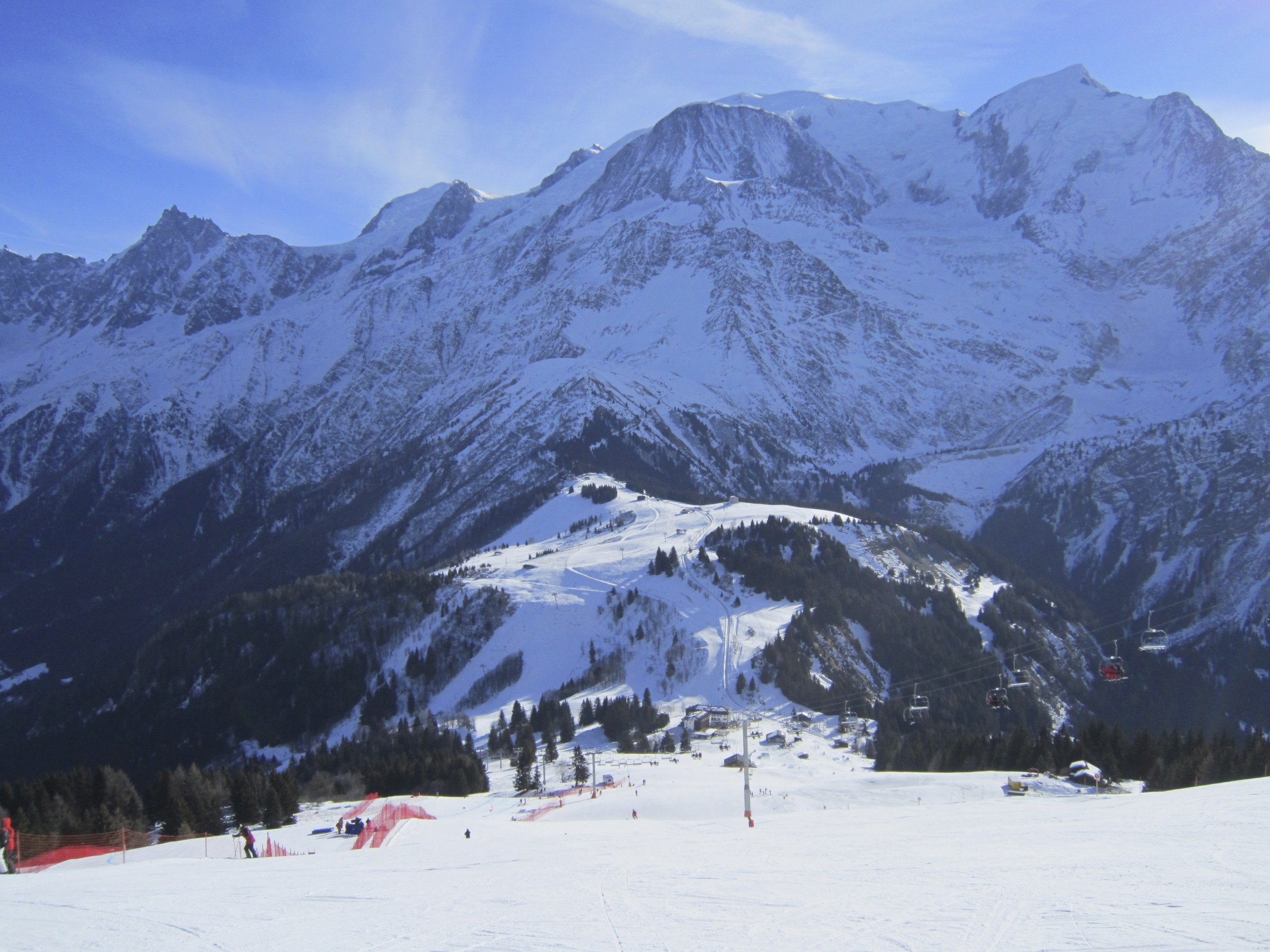
Top of the Voza Prarion chair lift, from Prarion

== See also ==
- Communes of the Haute-Savoie department
- Les Houches Accords
