= De Roy (disambiguation) =

De Roy or Deroy is a surname.

De Roy or variants may also refer to:

- De Roy (crater) on the Moon
- Lac de Roy, a lake in Haute-Savoie, France
- Prentis Building and DeRoy Auditorium Complex, Detroit, Michigan, United States
