= Cathubodua =

Gaulish deity

Cathubodua (Proto-Celtic: *Katu-bodwā, "battle crow") is an ancient Celtic god attested in a single votive inscription found near Mieussy in Haute Savoie, eastern France. Following the discovery of the inscription in 1867, reconstruction of the etymology of their name by Adolphe Pictet led him to speculate a connection to the Badb, a goddess who appears in Irish mythology, and interpret Cathubodua similarly as a war goddess. Other scholars have since alternatively interpreted Cathubodua as a god of victory, comparable to the Greek goddess Nike.

== Etymology ==
In the Gaulish language, the name Cathubodua is believed to mean battle-crow. Etymological lexical forms reconstructed in the University of Wales' Proto-Celtic lexicon, suggest that the name is likely to be ultimately derived from the Proto-Celtic *Katu-bodwā (*katu meaning "war, battle" and *bodwā meaning "crow"), a word that could be interpreted as ‘battle-fighting’. Jufer and Luginbühl offer an alternative etymology, connecting -bodua to *boudi- / bodio- ("victory, advantage").

== Mieussy Inscription ==
The inscription found near Mieussy is engraved in a badly worn stone altar dated to the time of Roman Gaul. Carved in the Latin script, the inscription reads:

[...]ATHVBODVAE AVG SERVILIA TERENTIA S L M

— Inscription from Mieussy

Several of the letters are the initials for a Latin phrase commonly inscribed into Roman altars, shrines, statues and other items dedicated to a deity in fulfillment of a vow (known as VSLM inscriptions). In full, the text reads:

[C]ATHVBODVAE AVG(VSTAE) SERVILIA TERENTIA (VOTVM) S(OLVIT) L(IBENS) M(ERITO)

The text's restitution as Cathubodua depends on the assumptions that an initial C has been lost and that the personal names ATEBODVAE, ATEBODVVS and ATEBODVI in 3 other inscriptions in modern Austria and Slovenia are unrelated.

== Bibliography ==
- Dottin, Georges (1918). La Langue Gauloise, Grammaire, Textes et Glossaire. Paris: Librairie C. Klincksieck. p. 235, 244.
- W. M. Hennessey (1870). The Ancient Irish Goddess of War.
- Pictet, Adolphe (1868). "SUR UNE NOUVELLE DÉESSE GAULOISE DE LA GUERRE". Revue Archéologique. 18: 1–17. ISSN 0035-0737. JSTOR 41733071.
- Jufer, Nicole; Luginbühl, Thierry (2001). dieux gaulois: répertoire des noms de divinités celtiques connus par l'épigraphie, les textes antiques et la toponymie. Errance. ISBN 9782877722001.
