= Roy Lake =

Roy Lake may refer to:

- Roy Lake, Minnesota, an unincorporated community
- Roy Lake State Park, a state park in South Dakota
- Lac de Roy, a lake in France
