= Praz de Lys-Sommand =

Ski resort in France

Praz de Lys - Sommand
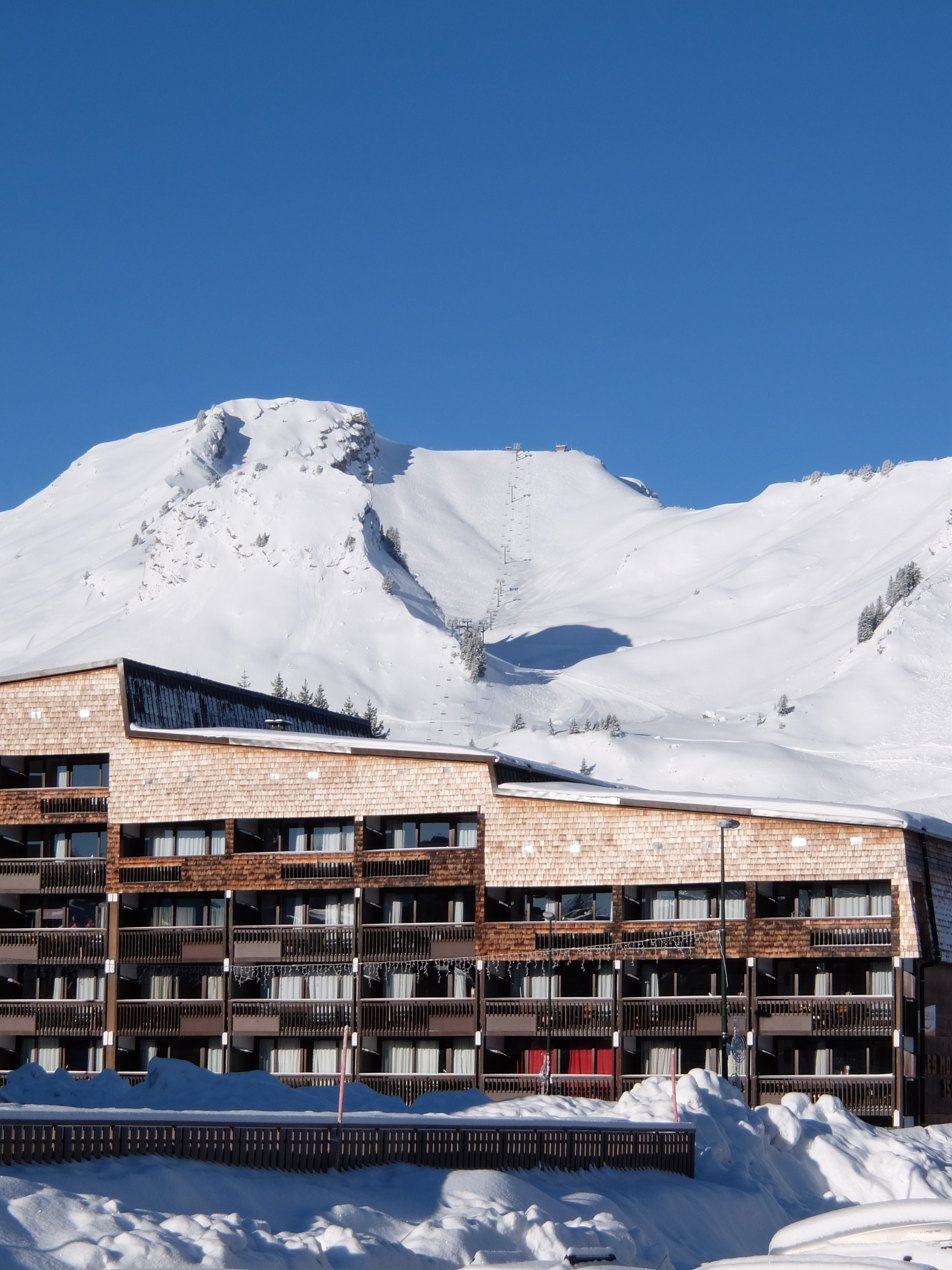
- One of the main buildings in the centre of Praz de Lys. With the resort's highest point, Haut Fleury, and the chairlift leading up to it, in the background.

- Location within Alps
- Location: Sommand
- Nearest city: Mieussy
- Coordinates: 46.146956°N 6.590595°E
- Vertical: 600 m (2,000 ft)
- Top elevation: 2,000 m (6,600 ft)
- Base elevation: 1,500 m (4,900 ft)
- Trails: 53
- Website: www.prazdelys-sommand.com

Praz de Lys - Sommand is a ski resort in Mieussy and Taninges France consisting of Sommand resort and Praz de Lys resort both linked by ski trails and chair lifts over and around their dividing mountains. The ski resort of Les Gets is also nearby Praz de Lys, about 15 minutes drive. It was opened in approximately 1978.

There are 24 ski lifts, 6 chairlifts, beginner's areas in both sides with a child-safe moving carpet lift, and a Snowpark and Boarder cross ski areas on the Sommand side.

Sommand and Praz de Lys permit only low impact minimal infrastructure development to preserve the natural environment and views. The focus is on enjoyment of nature, and new permitted development uses traditional savoyard chalet construction and is within zoned areas naturally screened by pine forests.

Downhill skiing is available at all levels from black runs through gentle family runs. The area also offers cross country ski trails, and walking trails, and maintains a family-oriented focus.

== Winter ==
=== Ski area ===
==== Alpine skiing ====
===== Praz de Lys =====
| Trail | Name | Length | Lifts |
|---|---|---|---|
| H1 | Chevaly | 650 m | Téléskis de Chevaly |
| H2 | Chevaly | 300 m | Tapis de Beuloz |
| I1 | Jora | 520 m | Téléski de Jora |
| A1 | Les Têtras | 3380 m | Télésiège de Praz l'Évêque |
| A4 | Les Prèses | 600 m | Télésiège de Praz l'Évêque |
| B2 | Retour Hôtel | 260 m | Téléski de Hôtel |
| B3 | Accès Planey | 260 m | Téléski de Planey |
| C1 | Hôtel | 1050 m | Téléski de Hôtel |
| F1 | Piste du Lac | 4160 m | Télésiège du Haut Fleury |
| J1 | Brésy | 1200 m | Téléski de Brésy |
| K2 | Marmotte | 2600 m | Télésiège de Véran |
| L3 | La Traverse | 1100 m | Télésiège de Brésy |
| L4 | Accès Véran | 500 m | Télésiège de Roy |
| M1 | Les Betex | 550 m | Téléski de Betex |
| A2 | Les Mouflons | 3120 m | Télésiège de Praz l'Évêque |
| A3 | Les Chamois | 1430 m | Télésiège de Praz l'Évêque |
| J2 | Brésy | 1300 m | Téléski de Brésy |
| K1 | Véran | 1430 m | Télésiège de Véran |
| L1 | Roy | 1820 m | Télésiège de Roy |
| L2 | La Face | 1500 m | Télésiège de Roy |
| B1 | Planey | 1000 m | Téléski de Planey |

===== Sommand =====
| Piste | Name | Length | Lifts |
|---|---|---|---|
| O3 | Retour Station - Retour Fleury | | Téléskis de Fleury |
| S1 | Tapis de la Mary | 90 m | Tapis de la Mary |
| U3 | Retour Station | | Téléski de Mouille Noire |
| D1 | Pierres Rouges | 1200 m | Télésiège de Pierres Rouges |
| K3 | Accès Sommand | | Télésiège de Pierres Rouges |
| N1 | Buchilles 1 | 600 m | Téléski de Buchilles |
| 02 | Les Flattes | 600 m | Téléski de Fleury |
| P2 | Accès Fleury | | Téléski de Crinta |
| Q1 | Farquet 1 | 300 m | Téléski de Farquet |
| Q2 | Farquet 2 | 300 m | Téléski de Farquet |
| T1 | Col de Sommand | 2000 m | Télésiège du Col de Sommand |
| T2 | Les Mottes | 2100 m | Télésiège du Col de Sommand |
| T3 | Liaison | | Télésiège du Col de Sommand |
| U2 | Les Sapins | 700 m | Téléski de Mouille Noire |
| V2 | Ima | 1500 m | Téléski de Platière |
| W3 | Les Granges | 1200 m | Téléski d'Echeru |
| D2 | Boarder Cross | 600 m | Télésiège de Pierres Rouges |
| N2 | Buchilles 2 | 520 m | Téléski de Buchilles |
| O1 | Fleury | 400 m | Téléski de Fleury |
| P1 | Snow Park | 500 m | Téléski de Crinta |
| U1 | Mouille Noire | 580 m | Téléski de Mouille Noire |
| V1 | La Platière | 1350 m | Téléski de Platière |
| W1 | Roche Pallud | 1000 m | Téléski d'Echeru |
| F4 | Le Vélard | 2000 m | Télésiège du Haut Fleury |
| F5 | La Combe Perret | 1500 m | Télésiège du Haut Fleury |
| W2 | Echeru | 800 m | Téléski d'Echeru |

==== Nordic skiing ====
===== Praz de Lys =====
| Trail | Name | Length | Notes |
|---|---|---|---|
| A | Piste d'initiation | 1200 m | |
| C | Le Jora | 5000 m | |
| B | Les Betex | 2500 m | |
| D | La Savolière | 5000 m | |
| E | Les Lys | 10 000 m | |
| F | Molly | 8000 m | |
| N | Les Lys | 10 500 m | Jonction de Praz de Lys à Sommand |

- Maintained cross country ski run Nordic Skiing

- 2 pistes d'initiation - 3 pistes vertes - 3 pistes bleus - 4 pistes rouges - 3 pistes noires

60 km of cross country skiing.

- Winter snow shoeing trails

30 km of snow trails

=== Nearby peaks and their distances ===
- Haute-Pointe (1,958 m)
- Pointe de Rovagne (1,795 m)
- Pointe de Chavannais (1,851 m)
- Pointe de Chavasse (2,012 m)
- Pointe de Chalune (2,116 m)
- Roc d'Enfer (2,244 m)
- Pointe d'Uble (1,963 m)
- Pointe de Marcelly (1,999 m)
- Pointe de la Couennasse (1,980 m)
- Pointe de Perret (,1941 m)
- Pointe du Haut-Fleury (1,981 m)
- Pointe de Véran (1,892 m)

== Summer activities ==
In summer the twinned station often sees road cycle racing including the Tour de France. The annual Col du Ramaz is a race to the top of the pass that lies between the two resorts starting at Mieussy. In winter there is a cross country ski race of the same name.

The area is a protected development nature reserve known for its views to Mont Blanc Massif range. Many hiking trails are available through maps distributed by the tourist offices based in Mieussy or Taninges. Some of the walks include the easy family walk to lac de Roy, the mountain peak of pic de Marcelly, the pointe Chalune, Pointe d'Uble.

In summertime the main chairlift is open to the Haute Fleury for walking and further hiking.

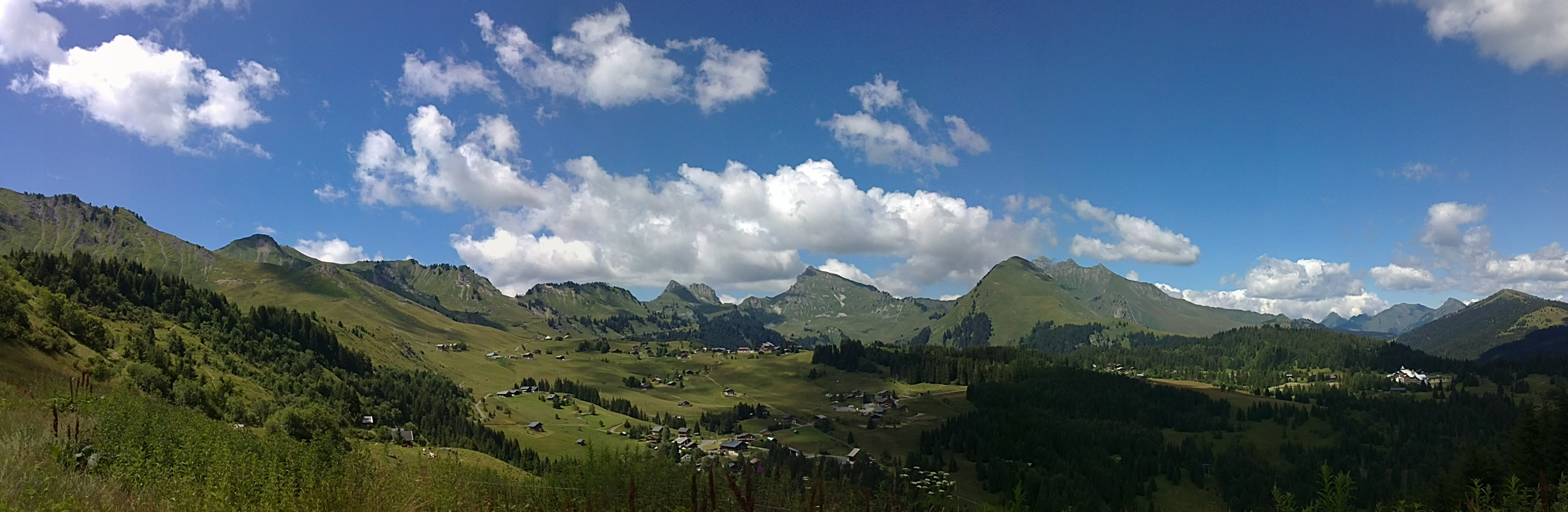
Panoramic view of the plateau of Praz-de-Lys, seen from Planey

=== External links ===
- Official website
- Sommand - Praz de Lys, photographic view
