= Boudiga =

The name Boudiga may refer to:

- Boudica (also spelled "Boudiga") (died 60 or 61 CE), the Brythonic queen (or chieftainess) of the Icenes
- Boudiga or Tutela Boudiga, a Gaulish war goddess thought to be related to Cathubodua
