= Mieussy =

Mieussy Miœci (Savoyard)
- Commune
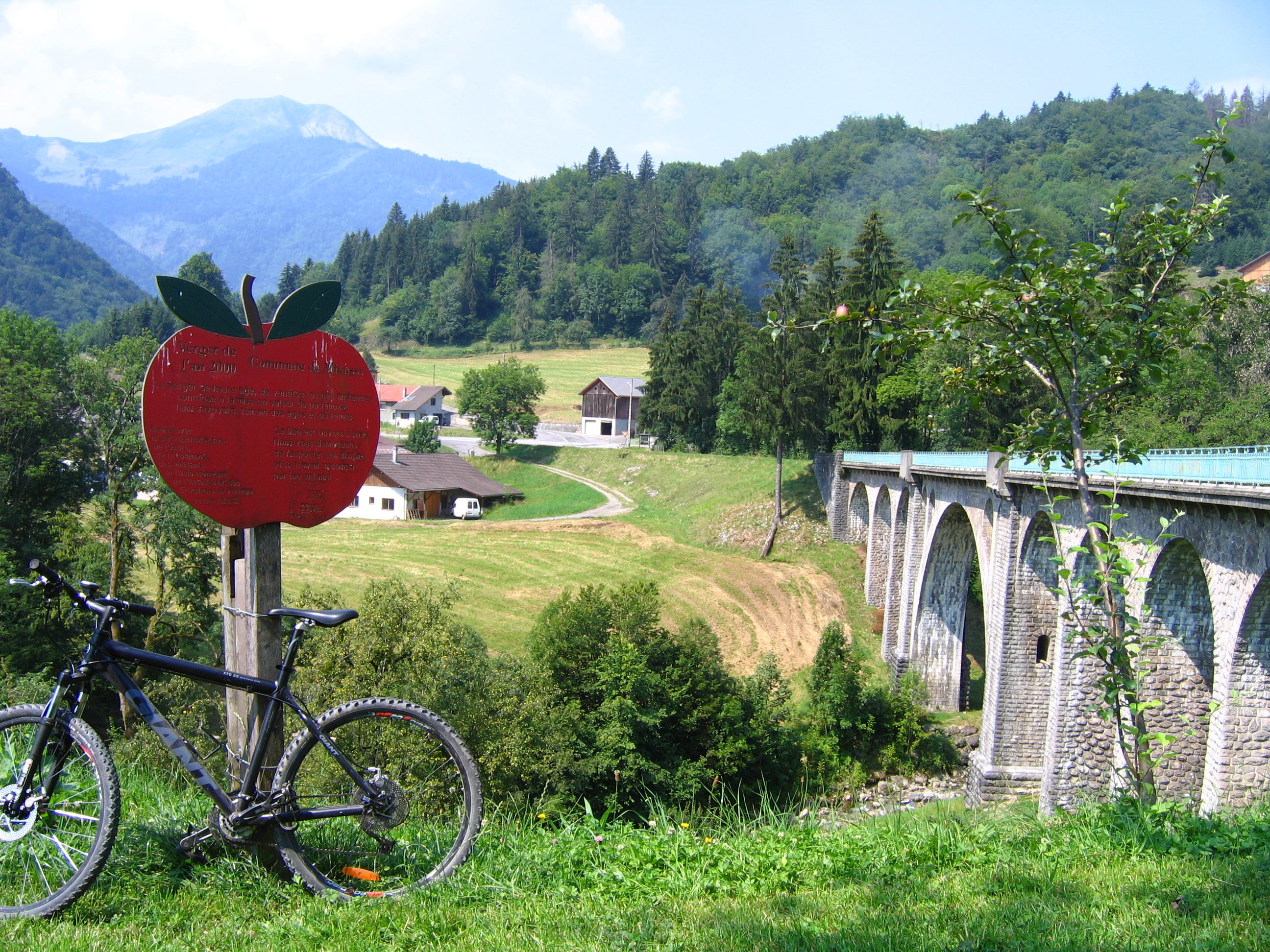
- A view of the bridge of Mieussy

- Coat of arms
- Location of Mieussy
- Location within France Location within Auvergne-Rhône-Alpes
- Coordinates: 46°08′05″N 6°31′24″E
- Country: France
- Region: Auvergne-Rhône-Alpes
- Department: Haute-Savoie
- Arrondissement: Bonneville
- Canton: Cluses

Government
  - Mayor (2020–2026): Régis Forestier
- Area^{1}: 44.45 km^{2} (17.16 sq mi)
- Highest elevation: 2,011 m (6,598 ft)
- Lowest elevation: 571 m (1,873 ft)
- Population (2023): 2,530
  - Density: 56.9/km^{2} (147/sq mi)
- Time zone: UTC+01:00 (CET)
  - Summer (DST): UTC+02:00 (CEST)
- INSEE/Postal code: 74183 /74440
- Website: Mieussy.eu
- ^{1} French Land Register data, which excludes lakes, ponds, glaciers > 1 km^{2} (0.386 sq mi or 247 acres) and river estuaries.

Mieussy (French pronunciation: [mjøsi]; Savoyard: Miœci) is a commune in the Haute-Savoie department in the Auvergne-Rhône-Alpes region of France. It is a traditional Alpine farming village in the Vallée du Giffre, around 35 kilometers east of Geneva. The area is known for its scenic views, skiing, and local foods. It is host to the "Foire d' Automne", a harvest festival which runs for two days in October.

== Population ==
Historical population
Year	Pop.	±% p.a.
1968	1,141	—
1975	1,167	+0.32%
1982	1,169	+0.02%
1990	1,346	+1.78%
1999	1,739	+2.89%
2007	2,052	+2.09%
2012	2,118	+0.64%
2017	2,340	+2.01%
2023	2,530	+1.31%
Source: INSEE

== Winter skiing ==
Mieussy has its own high-altitude ski resort, Sommand, starting at 1,500 metres (4,900 ft) and with 60 kilometres (37 mi) of downhill runs suitable for all levels. This is integrated over and around the surrounding mountains to the neighboring ski resort of Praz de Lys.

== Summer ==
Mieussy has one of the largest commune areas with many traditional chalet farm hamlets. These small rural farms continue the traditions with the passing of century, making a range of savoyard products, including reblochon. The Fruitiere in the village sells locally made farm produce, including reblochon.

In the summer, maps of the surrounding hiking trails lead through meadows and forests up into the mountains and are available from the Mieussy tourist office.

Each year the village is host to the traditional farmers harvest market, Mieussy "Foire d' Automne", when thousands spill into its streets to buy sweet chestnuts, fresh pressed apple juice, Savoyard meats and cheeses in a general celebration of the harvest. The festival runs for two days in October and is the largest authentic farmers festival in the region.

== Paragliding ==
Mieussy became known as the birthplace of paragliding when in June 1978 three friends, Jean-Claude Bétemps, André Bohn, and Gérard Bosson, were inspired by an article on ‘slope soaring’ in the Parachute Manual magazine. They calculated that on a suitable slope, a square parachute could be inflated by running down a slope; Bétemps launched from Pointe du Pertuiset, Mieussy, and flew 100 metres (330 ft). Andre Bohn followed him and glided down to the football pitch in the valley 1,000 metres (3,300 ft) below. ‘Parapente’ was born (pente being French for slope).

A paragliding school and introductory tandem flights are offered by the Mieussy football pitch.

== Transport ==
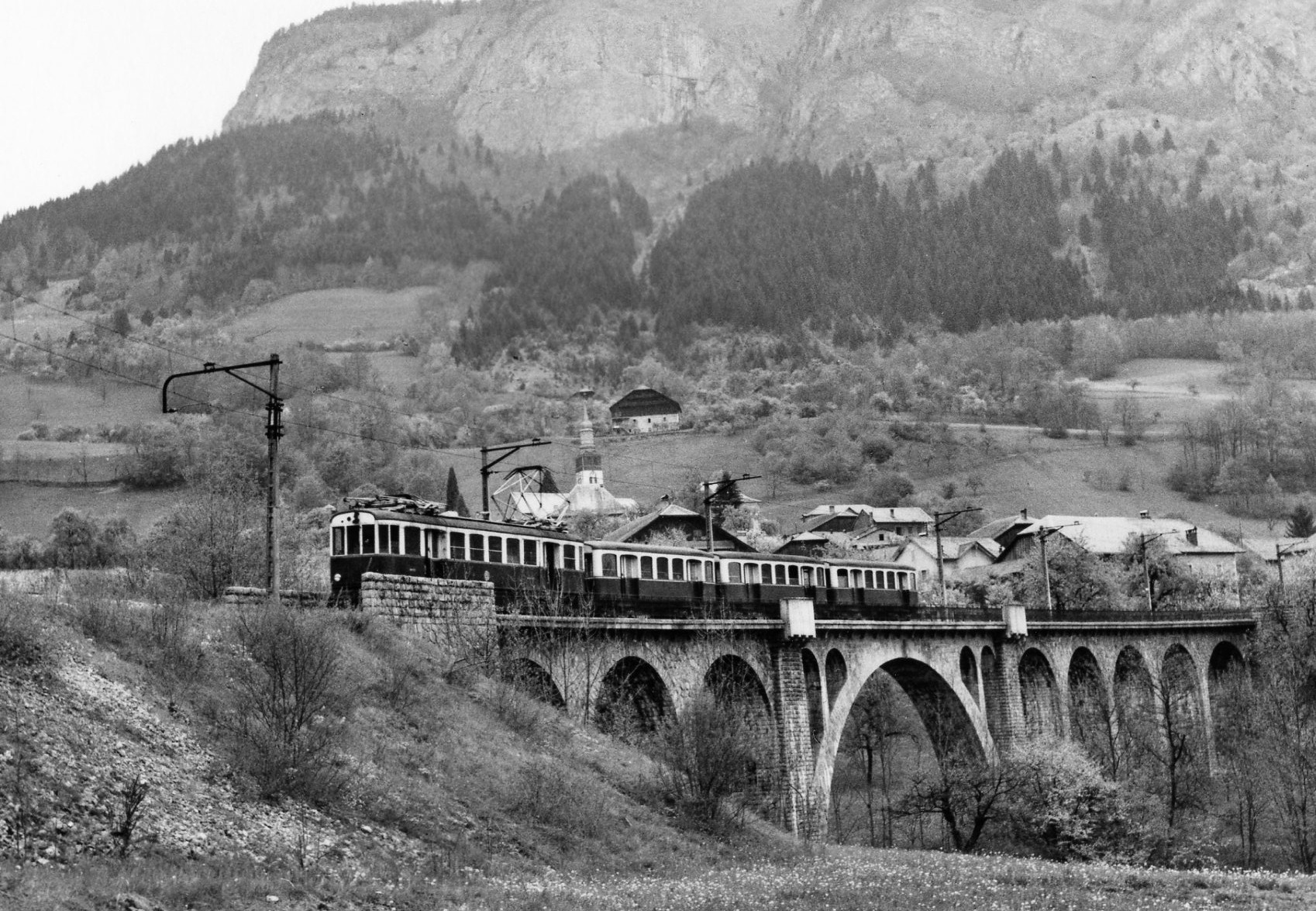
The viaduct in Mieussy in 1955

A 44 kilometres (27 mi) tramway from Annemasse to Samoëns operated by CEN Réseau de la Haute-Savoie started services in 1891. Four services per day were operated using steam tramway engines.

On 24 August 1932 a 10 kilometres (6.2 mi) extension to Sixt-Fer-à-Cheval was opened and at the same time the whole line was converted to electric traction.

All services were closed on 15 May 1959.

== See also ==
- Communes of the Haute-Savoie department
- Praz de Lys-Sommand
