= Pointe de Chalune =

Mountain in Haute-Savoie, France

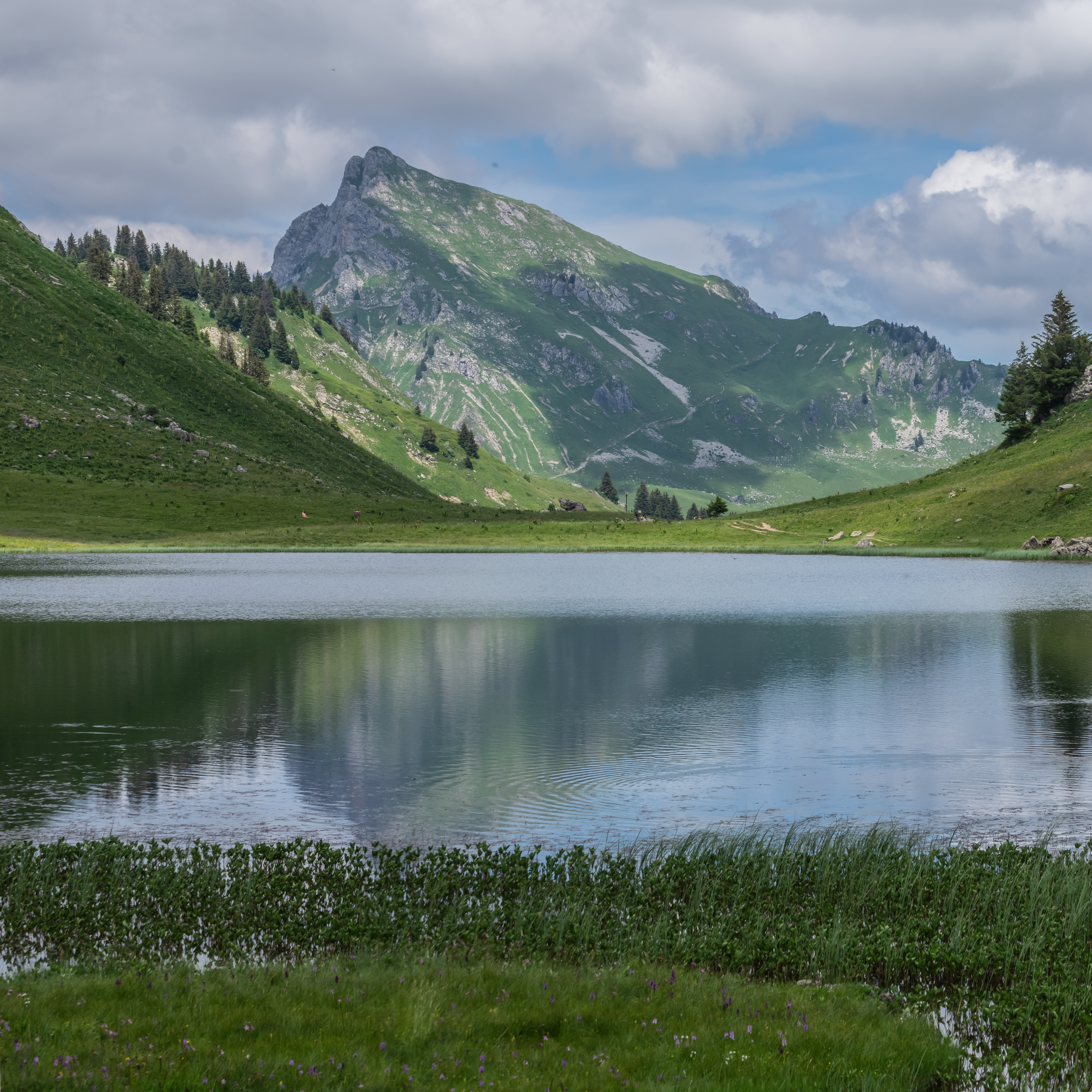

Highest point
- Elevation: 2,116 m (6,942 ft)
- Coordinates: 46°10′48″N 06°34′53″E

Geography
- Location within France
- Location: Haute-Savoie, France
- Parent range: Chablais Alps

The Pointe de Chalune (French pronunciation: [pwɛ̃t də ʃalyn]; 2,116 m) is a mountain in the Chablais Alps in Haute-Savoie, France.
