= Georges Dottin =

French philologist

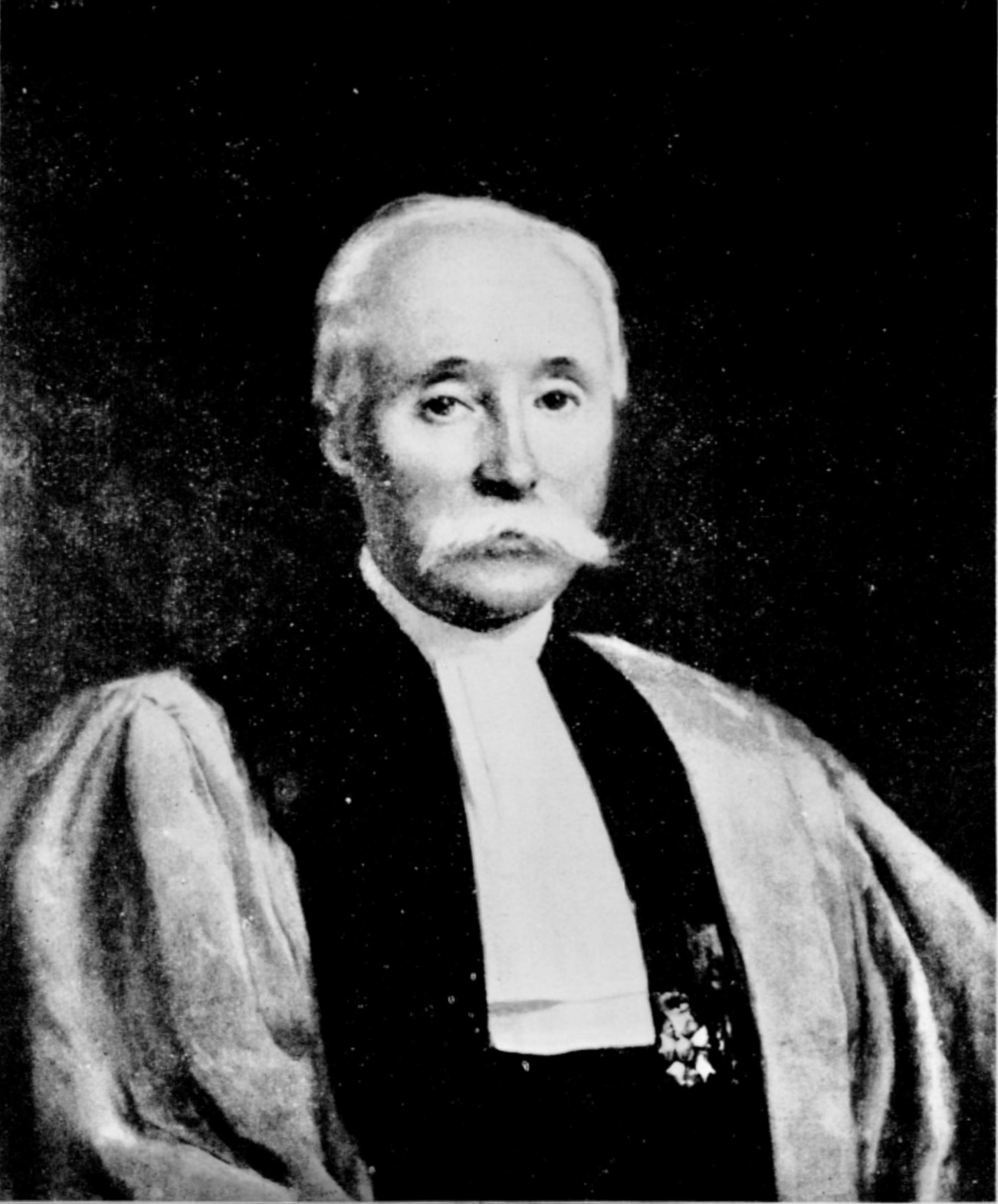
- Born: 29 October 1863; Liancourt, Oise
- Died: 11 January 1928 (aged 64); Rennes, Ille-et-Vilaine
- Citizenship: French
- Occupation: Philologist

Academic background
- Education: University of Rennes; Sorbonne University; École Pratique des Hautes Études

Academic work
- Institutions: University of Rennes
- Notable works: La langue gauloise (1918)

Henri-Georges Dottin (29 October 1863 – 11 January 1928) was a French philologist, Celtic scholar, and politician. His magnum opus, La langue gauloise (1918), remained the reference introduction to the Gaulish language until the publication of Pierre-Yves Lambert's La langue gauloise in 1994. It is still widely used today as a textbook in Celtic linguistic studies.

== Biography ==
Henri-Georges Dottin was born on 29 October 1863 in Liancourt, Oise, the son of Charles-Henri Dottin, a tax collector and poet from Liancourt, and Marie-Cléophée-Mathilde Pourcelle, the daughter of Nicolas Florimond Pourcelle (1789–1858), a court bailiff and magistrate from Breteuil, Oise. The family established itself in Laval, Mayenne, where Dottin attended the lycée of Laval. He studied at the University of Rennes, from where he graduated (1884), then at Sorbonne University and the École Pratique des Hautes Études.

In 1891, Dottin was awarded the post of lecturer at the University of Dijon. From November 1892, he lectured in Ancient Greek at the University of Rennes in Brittany, at that time a deeply clericalist and conservative region. He married Marie Delaunay on 20 November 1894. In 1896, Dottin became Doctor of Literature, then was appointed Professor of Celtic languages in 1903 at the University of Rennes. Here, he met Victor Basch et Henri Sée, who became his friends and fellow political activists.

A left-wing Republican, Dottin took the side of Alfred Dreyfus, a French Jewish officer wrongly convicted of treason in 1894. In January 1899, he exposed "the situation of the proletariat abroad" to the activists of the Rennes Bourse du Travail, and in May of the same year presided over a meeting devoted to the Dreyfus Affair during which several professors from the University of Rennes expressed themselves.

In May 1908, Dottin was elected first deputy-mayor of Rennes on the Liste d'Entente des Comités Républicains, a coalition of Republicans, Socialists and anti-clericalists led by Jean Janvier, mayor of Rennes from 1908 to 1923. In 1910, Dottin was nominated as dean of the University of Rennes, succeeding Joseph Loth, and he subsequently left his position as first deputy-mayor after another municipal election in May 1912. He nonetheless remained a municipal councillor until his death in 1928. As president of the Comité Radical et Radical-Socialiste de Rennes, Dottin was elected mayor of Rennes in the municipal election of 1925, but chose to leave the position to his friend Carle Bahon, who became the first Socialist mayor of the city. In 1919 he was awarded the Legion of Honour and was made correspondent of the Académie des Inscriptions et Belles Lettres.

Dottin opposed both the "reactionaries" who, in his words, tried to "maintain the Bretons in ancient prejudices", and the bourgeois and urban elite of Brittany who dismissed education in the Breton language as old-fashioned and as a fertile ground to separatism and nationalism. Instead, he considered that Breton culture and language should not be opposed to Republicanism and French patriotism, and called for the teaching of Breton in elementary schools, high schools, and universities.

Georges Dottin died in Rennes on the night of 11–12 January 1928, at the age of 64, having contracted typhoid fever during his convalescence following a prostate operation. His son, Paul Dottin (1895–1965), was a linguist.

== Publications ==
- La Croyance à l'immortalité de l'âme chez les anciens Irlandais, Ernest Leroux, Paris, 1886
- Notes sur le patois de Montjean (Mayenne), Revue des patois gallo-romans vol. 1 (1887)
- Les désinences verbales en r en sanskrit, en italique et en celtique, Plihon et Hervé, Rennes, 1896
- Glossaire des parlers du Bas-Maine (département de la Mayenne), Welter, Paris, 1899
- Glossaire du parler de Pléchâtel (Bain, Ille-et-Vilaine), précédé d'une étude sur les parlers de la Haute-Bretagne et suivi d'un relevé des usages et des traditions de Pléchâtel, Rees, 1901
- La Religion des Celtes, 1904
- Manuel d'Irlandais Moyen, Slatkine, Paris, 1913
- Manuel pour servir a l'étude de l'antiquité celtique, Champion, 2nd ed., Paris, 1915
- La Langue Gauloise : Grammaire, Textes et Glossaire, preface by François Falc'hun, C. Klincksieck, Paris, 1918
- Les littératures celtique, Collection Payot, Paris, 1924
- with J. Ollivier, Anatole Le Braz : Biographie et essai de bibliographie, Champion, Paris, 1928
- Les Celtes, Minerva, Genève, 1977
- L'Épopée irlandaise, revised ed., 2006
