= Lac de Roy =

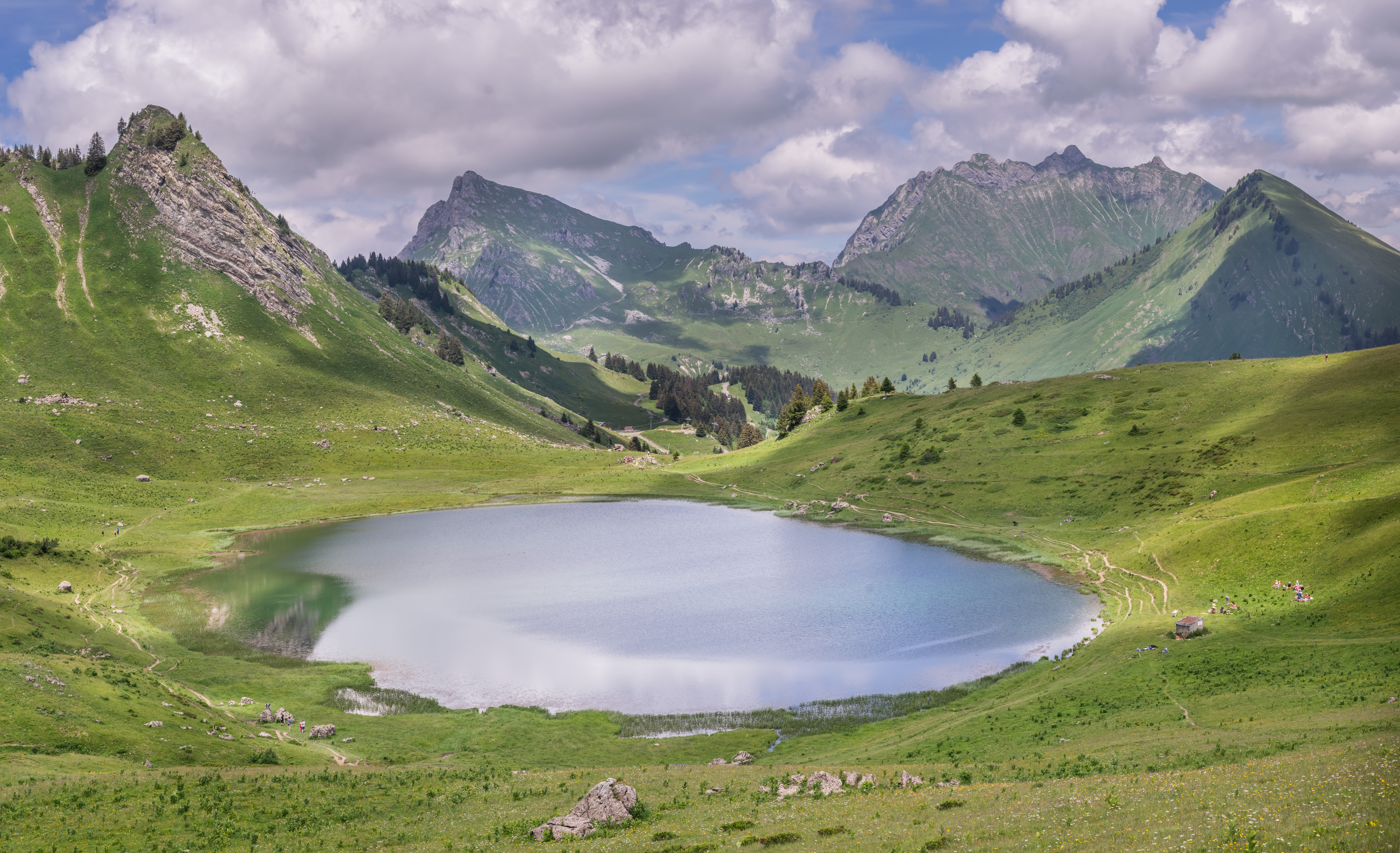

- Location within France
- Location: Haute-Savoie
- Coordinates: 46°8′36″N 6°34′25″E
- Type: Natural freshwater lake
- Basin countries: France
- Max. length: 265 m (869 ft)
- Max. width: 155 m (509 ft)
- Surface elevation: 1,680 m (5,510 ft)

Lac de Roy is a lake in Haute-Savoie, France. It is located 2 km west of le Praz de Lys (Praz de Lys-Sommand?) ski resort, in the commune of Taninges.

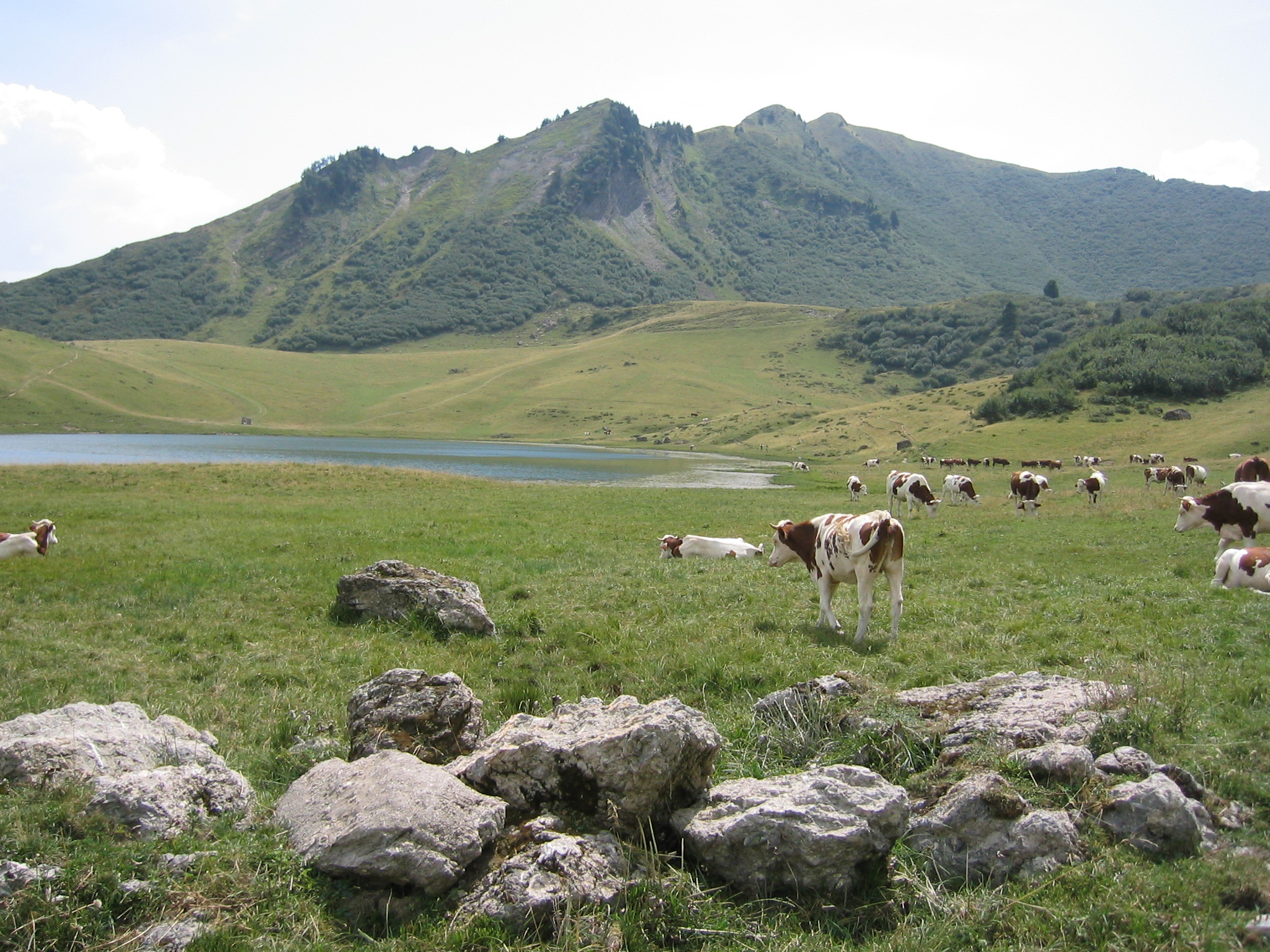
