= Savigny, Haute-Savoie =

Savigny Savnyi (Savoyard)
- Commune
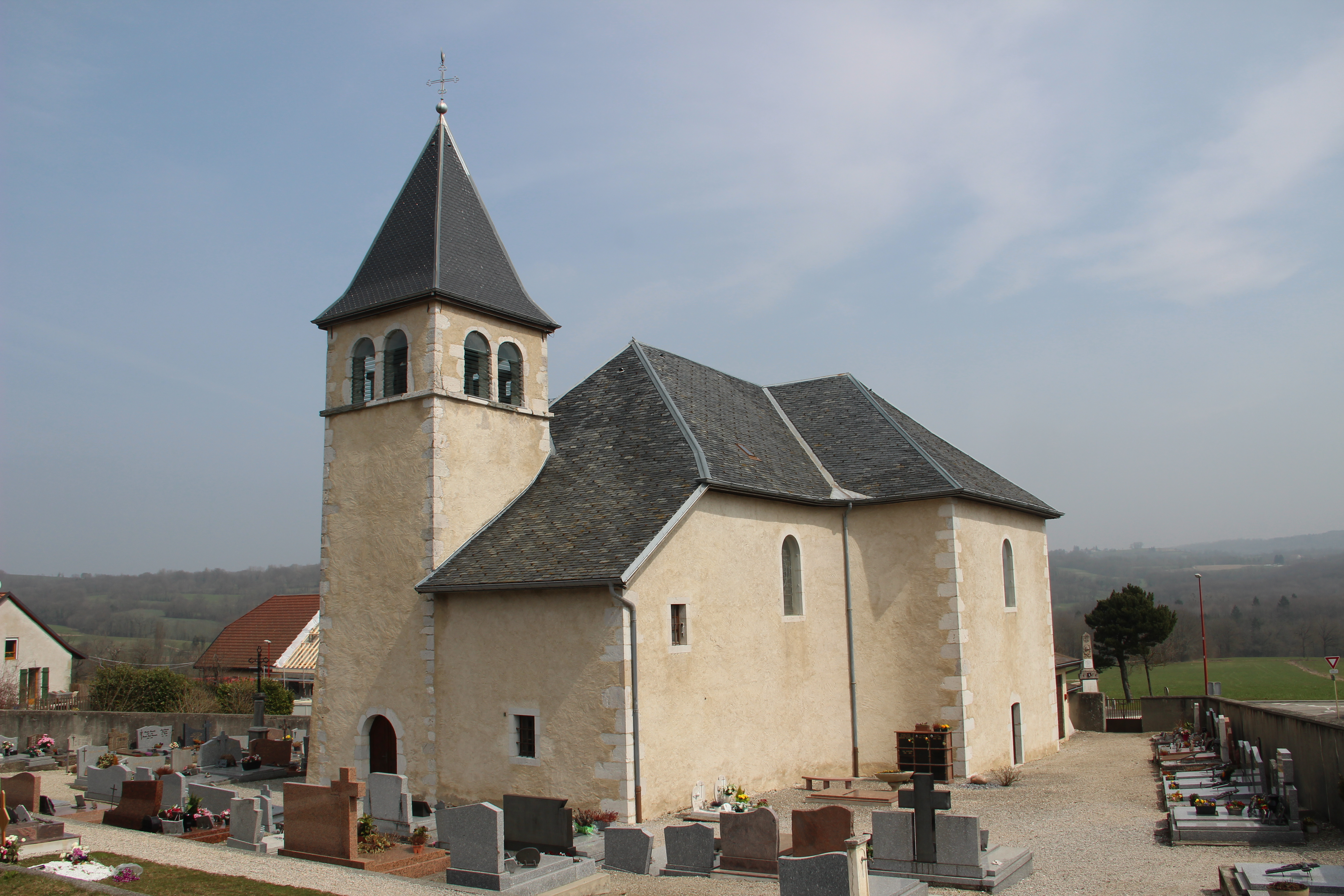
- The church in Savigny

- Coat of arms
- Location of Savigny
- Location within France Location within Auvergne-Rhône-Alpes
- Coordinates: 46°04′36″N 5°57′28″E
- Country: France
- Region: Auvergne-Rhône-Alpes
- Department: Haute-Savoie
- Arrondissement: Saint-Julien-en-Genevois
- Canton: Saint-Julien-en-Genevois
- Intercommunality: Genevois

Government
  - Mayor (2020–2026): Béatrice Fol
- Area^{1}: 10.52 km^{2} (4.06 sq mi)
- Highest elevation: 1,112 m (3,648 ft)
- Lowest elevation: 489 m (1,604 ft)
- Population (2023): 1,041
  - Density: 98.95/km^{2} (256.3/sq mi)
- Time zone: UTC+01:00 (CET)
  - Summer (DST): UTC+02:00 (CEST)
- INSEE/Postal code: 74260 /74520
- ^{1} French Land Register data, which excludes lakes, ponds, glaciers > 1 km^{2} (0.386 sq mi or 247 acres) and river estuaries.

Savigny (French pronunciation: [saviɲi]; Savoyard: Savnyi) is a commune in the Haute-Savoie department in the Auvergne-Rhône-Alpes region in south-eastern France.

== Geography ==
Savigny is located at an altitude of 568 m, approximately 22 km north-west of the city of Annecy. The dispersed settlement commune is located on the eastern foot of the Vuache near the wide valley of the Fornant in the Genevois.

The 10.52 km^{2} large communal area covers part of the Genevois. The eastern part of the area covers the valley of the Fornant, a right affluent of the Usses. From there, the commune area stretches over the fields and grasslands of Savigny up to the forested ridge of the Vuache where at an altitude of 1101 m the highest point of Savigny is reached. The northern border is formed by the wide mountain crest of the Montagne de Sion.

Apart from the actual village of Savigny, the commun covers various hamlets and farms. Among these are:

- Nyoux (510 m) in the Fornant valley
- Murcier (596 m) at the transition between the Vuache and the Montagne de Sion
- Cortagy (630 m) at the eastern slope of the Vuache
- Olliet (680 m) at the eastern slope of the Vuache
- Cessens (730 m) at the eastern slope of the Vuache

Neighbouring communes of Savigny are Dingy-en-Vuache in the north, Jonzier-Épagny in the east, Minzier in the southeast and Chaumont in the west.

== History ==
The area of Savigny was already populated in the Neolithic and during Roman times. First documented evidence of the village occurs in the 15th century. The village's name goes back to the Roman name Sabinus and means Estate of Sabinus.

== Places of interest ==
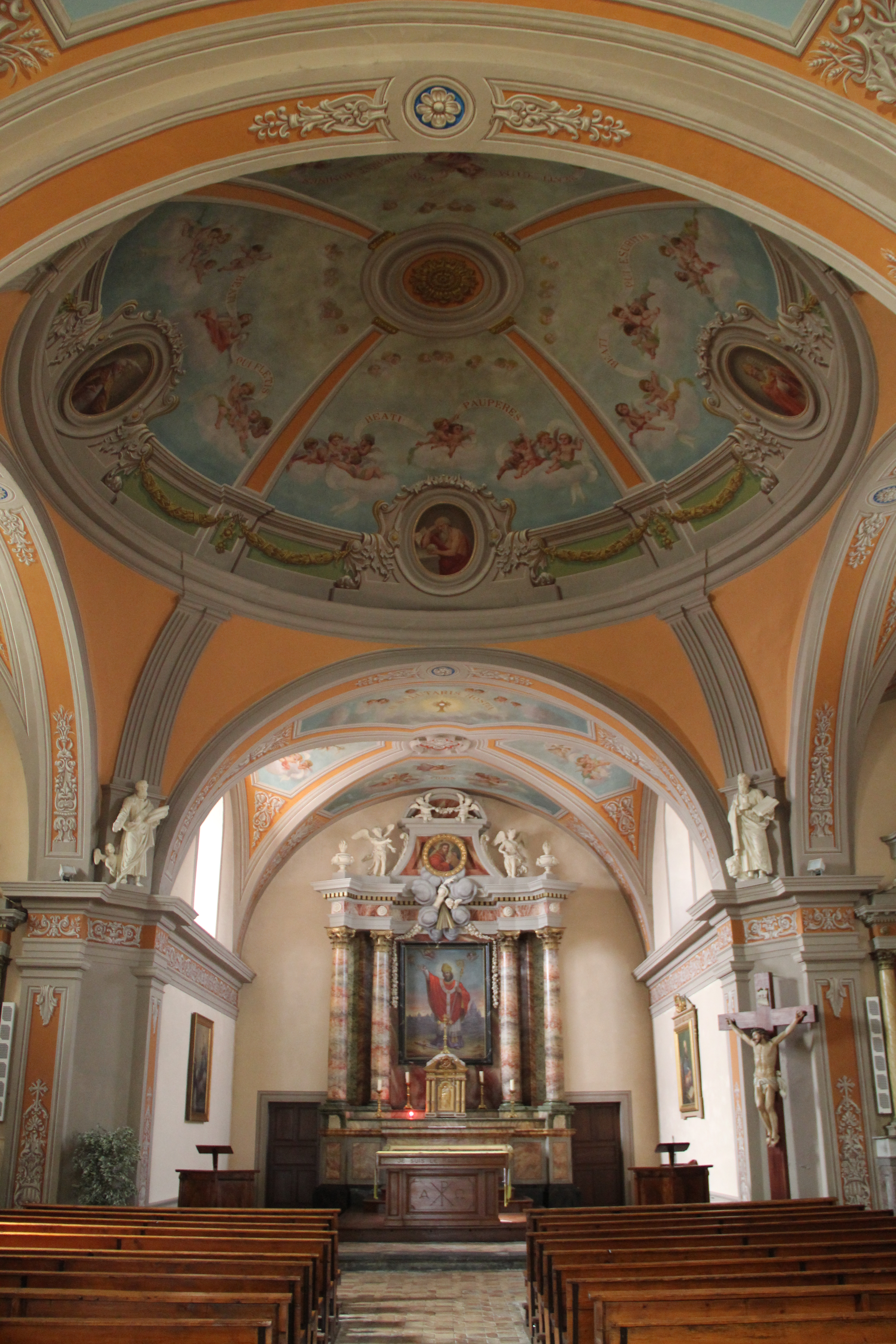
Interior of the church of Savigny

The church of Savigny was built in the 19th century and has a cupola in Sardinian style.

== Population ==
With a population of 736 inhabitants (January 2010), Savigny is one of the smaller communes in the departement Haute-Savoie. During the course of the 19th and 20th century, the population constantly declined due to strong emigration. In 1861, Savigny only had 595 inhabitants left. Since the beginning of the 1980s, a constant increase in population has taken place.

== Economy and Infrastructure ==
Savigny is still mostly dominated by agriculture. In addition, there are some small businesses. Many employees are commuters who work in the bigger villages of the surrounding as well as in the area of Annecy and Geneva-Annemasse.

The village is located on the departement road that leads from Vulbens to Chaumont. Additional road connections exist to Jonzier-Épagny and Minzier.

== See also ==
- Communes of the Haute-Savoie department
