= Vulbens =

Vulbens Vulbin (Savoyard)
- Commune
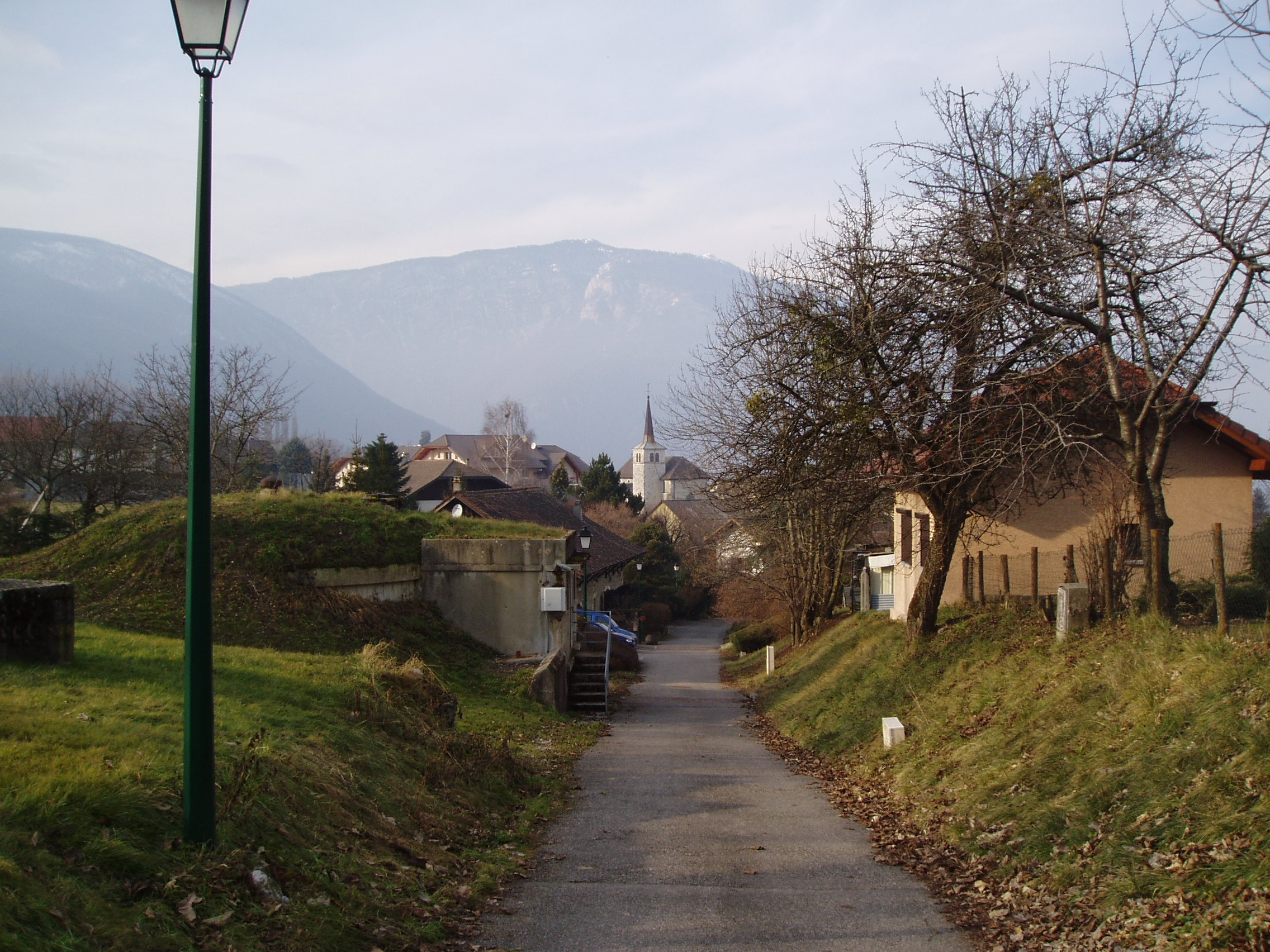
- A view within Vulbens

- Coat of arms
- Location of Vulbens
- Location within France Location within Auvergne-Rhône-Alpes
- Coordinates: 46°06′08″N 5°55′52″E
- Country: France
- Region: Auvergne-Rhône-Alpes
- Department: Haute-Savoie
- Arrondissement: Saint-Julien-en-Genevois
- Canton: Saint-Julien-en-Genevois
- Intercommunality: Genevois

Government
  - Mayor (2020–2026): Florent Benoit
- Area^{1}: 12.53 km^{2} (4.84 sq mi)
- Highest elevation: 920 m (3,020 ft)
- Lowest elevation: 327 m (1,073 ft)
- Population (2023): 1,783
  - Density: 142.3/km^{2} (368.6/sq mi)
- Time zone: UTC+01:00 (CET)
  - Summer (DST): UTC+02:00 (CEST)
- INSEE/Postal code: 74314 /74520
- Website: http://www.vulbens.fr
- ^{1} French Land Register data, which excludes lakes, ponds, glaciers > 1 km^{2} (0.386 sq mi or 247 acres) and river estuaries.

Vulbens (French pronunciation: [vylbɛ̃s]; Savoyard: Vulbin) is a commune in the Haute-Savoie department in the Auvergne-Rhône-Alpes region in south-eastern France.

Vulbens is located 20 kilometres southwest of Geneva, on the hills of the Vuache. Vulbens has a border with Switzerland, the commune of Chancy. Other neighbouring municipalities are Chevrier, Pougny, Valleiry, Viry and Dingy-en-Vuache.

== History ==
Vulbens was part of the former province Genevois of the Duchy of Savoy.

Templars moved in 1196 to Vulbens, near the place called "Port of the Isles" (near Collogny) and controlled the passage of the Rhone by people crossing by ferry Traille. The area of the Knights Templar later became the property of the hospital and then was transformed into a farm to the Revolution. Today, riding stables, the only visible remnant of his past is a portal which is engraved on the cross of Malta on the keystone.

During the French Revolution, the Savoy region was conquered by France and Vulbens became attached to the département of Léman, of which capital was Geneva. After the Bourbon Restoration in 1815, it was returned to the Kingdom of Sardinia (heir of the Duchy of Savoy). When Savoy was annexed to France in 1860, it became part of the new département of Haute-Savoie.

== Population ==
The inhabitants of Vulbens are called Vulbanaises and Vulbanais in French.

Historical population
Year	Pop.	±% p.a.
1968	511	—
1975	552	+1.11%
1982	667	+2.74%
1990	751	+1.49%
1999	784	+0.48%
2007	835	+0.79%
2012	1,161	+6.81%
2017	1,588	+6.46%
2023	1,783	+1.95%
Source: INSEE

== See also ==
- Communes of the Haute-Savoie department
