= Arrondissement of Saint-Julien-en-Genevois =

Coordinates: 46°08′32″N 6°04′39″E

Saint-Julien-en-Genevois
- Arrondissement
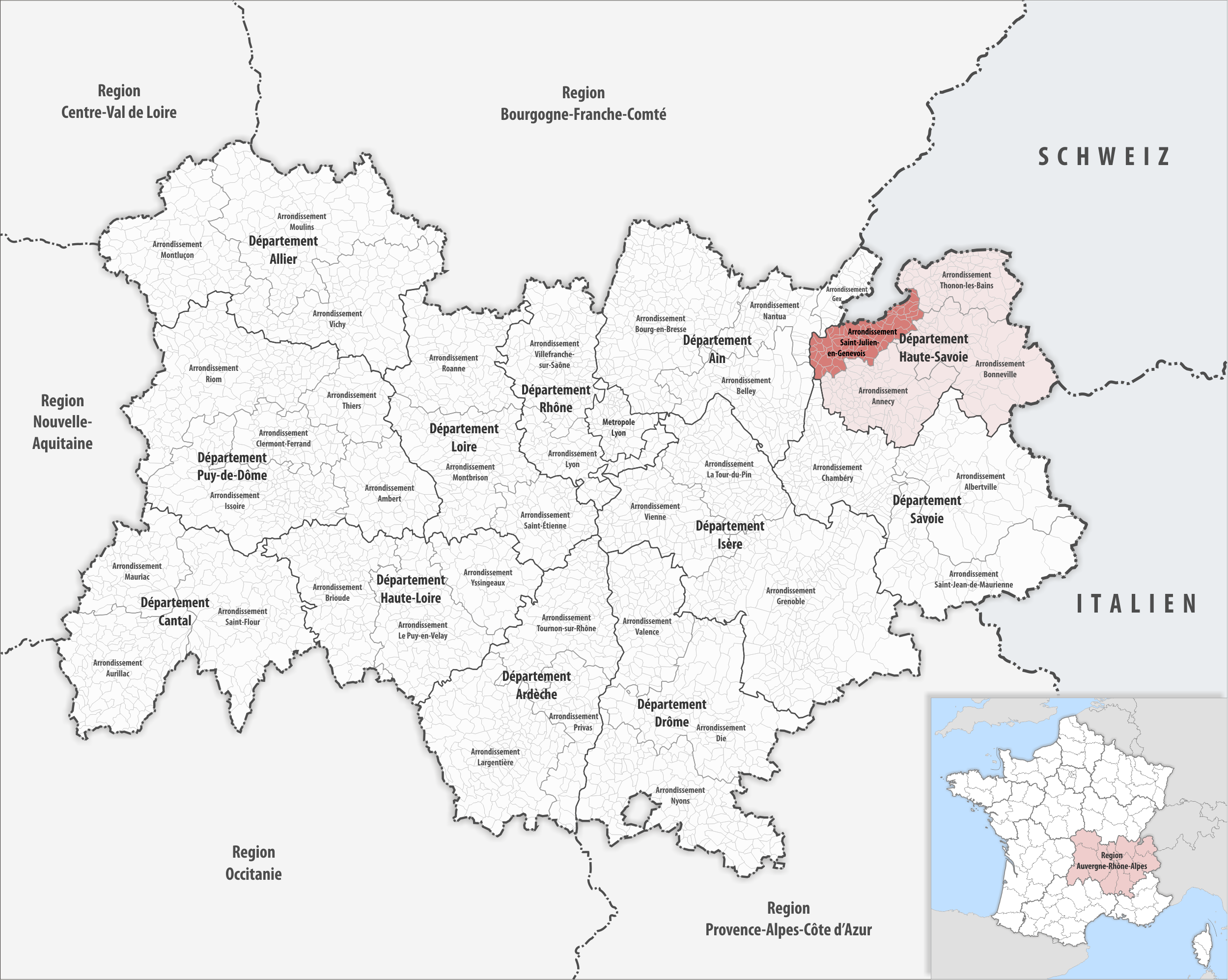
- Location within the region Auvergne-Rhône-Alpes
- Country: France
- Region: Auvergne-Rhône-Alpes
- Department: Haute-Savoie
- No. of communes: {{{nbcomm}}}
- Area: 656.3 km^{2} (253.4 sq mi)
- Population (2023): 204,177
  - Density: 311.1/km^{2} (805.8/sq mi)
- INSEE code: 743

The arrondissement of Saint-Julien-en-Genevois is an arrondissement of France in the Haute-Savoie department in the Auvergne-Rhône-Alpes region. It has 73 communes. Its population is 196,943 (2021), and its area is 656.3 km^{2} (253.4 sq mi).

== Composition ==
The communes of the arrondissement of Saint-Julien-en-Genevois, and their INSEE codes, are:

1. Allonzier-la-Caille (74006)
2. Ambilly (74008)
3. Andilly (74009)
4. Annemasse (74012)
5. Arbusigny (74015)
6. Archamps (74016)
7. Arthaz-Pont-Notre-Dame (74021)
8. Bassy (74029)
9. Beaumont (74031)
10. Bonne (74040)
11. Bossey (74044)
12. Cercier (74051)
13. Cernex (74052)
14. Challonges (74055)
15. Chaumont (74065)
16. Chavannaz (74066)
17. Chêne-en-Semine (74068)
18. Chênex (74069)
19. Chessenaz (74071)
20. Chevrier (74074)
21. Chilly (74075)
22. Clarafond-Arcine (74077)
23. Clermont (74078)
24. Collonges-sous-Salève (74082)
25. Contamine-Sarzin (74086)
26. Copponex (74088)
27. Cranves-Sales (74094)
28. Cruseilles (74096)
29. Cuvat (74098)
30. Desingy (74100)
31. Dingy-en-Vuache (74101)
32. Droisy (74107)
33. Éloise (74109)
34. Étrembières (74118)
35. Feigères (74124)
36. Franclens (74130)
37. Frangy (74131)
38. Gaillard (74133)
39. Jonzier-Épagny (74144)
40. Juvigny (74145)
41. Lucinges (74153)
42. Machilly (74158)
43. Marlioz (74168)
44. Menthonnex-en-Bornes (74177)
45. Menthonnex-sous-Clermont (74178)
46. Minzier (74184)
47. Monnetier-Mornex (74185)
48. La Muraz (74193)
49. Musièges (74195)
50. Nangy (74197)
51. Neydens (74201)
52. Pers-Jussy (74211)
53. Présilly (74216)
54. Reignier-Esery (74220)
55. Saint-Blaise (74228)
56. Saint-Cergues (74229)
57. Saint-Germain-sur-Rhône (74235)
58. Saint-Julien-en-Genevois (74243)
59. Le Sappey (74259)
60. Savigny (74260)
61. Scientrier (74262)
62. Seyssel (74269)
63. Usinens (74285)
64. Valleiry (74288)
65. Vanzy (74291)
66. Vers (74296)
67. Vétraz-Monthoux (74298)
68. Ville-la-Grand (74305)
69. Villy-le-Bouveret (74306)
70. Villy-le-Pelloux (74307)
71. Viry (74309)
72. Vovray-en-Bornes (74313)
73. Vulbens (74314)

== History ==
The arrondissement of Saint-Julien-en-Genevois was created in 1860, disbanded in 1926 and restored in 1933. In June 2023 it lost one commune to the arrondissement of Bonneville, and it gained two from the arrondissement of Annecy.

As a result of the reorganisation of the cantons of France which came into effect in 2015, the borders of the cantons are no longer related to the borders of the arrondissements. The cantons of the arrondissement of Saint-Julien-en-Genevois were, as of January 2015:

1. Annemasse-Nord
2. Annemasse-Sud
3. Cruseilles
4. Frangy
5. Reignier-Esery
6. Saint-Julien-en-Genevois
7. Seyssel
