= Droisy =

Droisy is the name of several communes in France:

- Droisy, Eure
- Droisy, Haute-Savoie
