= Desingy =

Desingy Dzinzhi (Savoyard)
- Commune
- Location of Desingy
- Location within France Location within Auvergne-Rhône-Alpes
- Coordinates: 45°59′46″N 5°53′27″E
- Country: France
- Region: Auvergne-Rhône-Alpes
- Department: Haute-Savoie
- Arrondissement: Saint-Julien-en-Genevois
- Canton: Saint-Julien-en-Genevois
- Intercommunality: Usses et Rhône

Government
  - Mayor (2020–2026): André Bouchet
- Area^{1}: 18.93 km^{2} (7.31 sq mi)
- Highest elevation: 661 m (2,169 ft)
- Lowest elevation: 260 m (850 ft)
- Population (2023): 764
  - Density: 40.4/km^{2} (105/sq mi)
- Time zone: UTC+01:00 (CET)
  - Summer (DST): UTC+02:00 (CEST)
- INSEE/Postal code: 74100 /74270
- ^{1} French Land Register data, which excludes lakes, ponds, glaciers > 1 km^{2} (0.386 sq mi or 247 acres) and river estuaries.

Desingy (French pronunciation: [dəzɛ̃ʒi]; Savoyard: Dzinzhi) is a commune in the Haute-Savoie department in the Auvergne-Rhône-Alpes region in south-eastern France.

== See also ==
- Communes of the Haute-Savoie department
