= Beaumont, Haute-Savoie =

Beaumont
- Commune
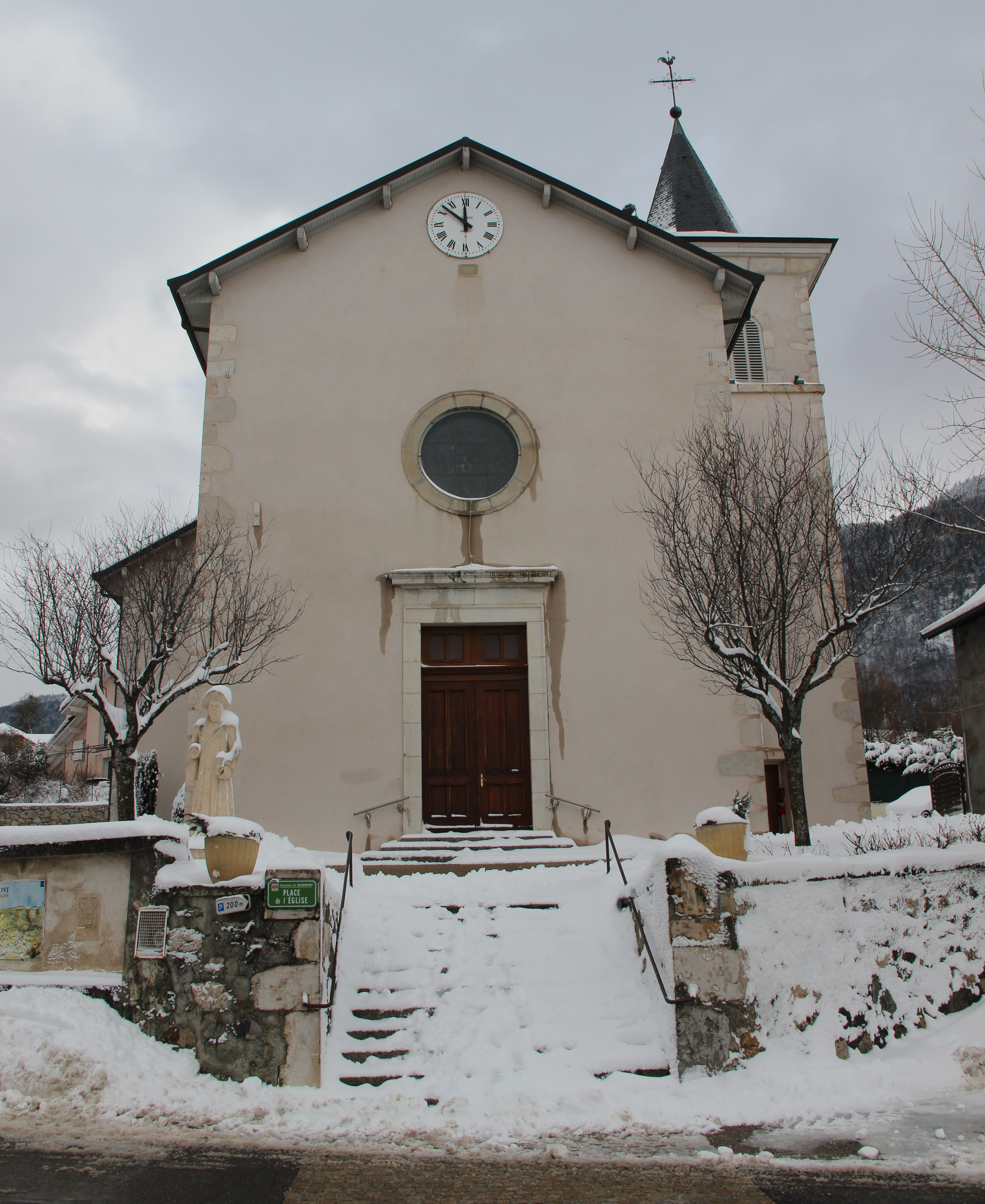
- Saint-Etienne church

- Coat of arms
- Location of Beaumont
- Location within France Location within Auvergne-Rhône-Alpes
- Coordinates: 46°05′44″N 6°06′07″E
- Country: France
- Region: Auvergne-Rhône-Alpes
- Department: Haute-Savoie
- Arrondissement: Saint-Julien-en-Genevois
- Canton: Saint-Julien-en-Genevois
- Intercommunality: Genevois

Government
  - Mayor (2020–2026): Marc Genoud
- Area^{1}: 9.74 km^{2} (3.76 sq mi)
- Highest elevation: 1,380 m (4,530 ft)
- Lowest elevation: 596 m (1,955 ft)
- Population (2023): 3,097
  - Density: 318/km^{2} (824/sq mi)
- Time zone: UTC+01:00 (CET)
  - Summer (DST): UTC+02:00 (CEST)
- INSEE/Postal code: 74031 /74160
- ^{1} French Land Register data, which excludes lakes, ponds, glaciers > 1 km^{2} (0.386 sq mi or 247 acres) and river estuaries.

Beaumont (French pronunciation: [bomɔ̃]; Arpitan: Bômon) is a commune in the Haute-Savoie department and the Auvergne-Rhône-Alpes region, southeastern France.

== Geography ==
Beaumont is a village situated in Haute-Savoie, in the Savoyard region of Geneva.

It is located at the foot of Salève, a mountain in the Pre-Alps whose highest point (the Grand Piton: 1,357 meters) is on the territory of the commune.

The commune is made up of three former communes: Beaumont, Jussy and Le Châble.

The municipality is organized into two distinct parts:

- the “Haut”, located on the first slopes of the Salève, and which corresponds to the capital of Beaumont, with the church and the cemetery, and all the surrounding localities (Jussy, le Fond de Beaumont, les Travers, Chez Marmoux, etc.);

- the “Bas”, located really at the foot of Salève, made up of the hamlet Le Châble, which is larger and more populated than Beaumont itself. There is the primary school (the Beaupré school group), the Beaumont town hall, the post office, the press, the pharmacy, playgrounds, small shops (bakery, Petit Casino, bank, hairdressers, butcher, etc.).

Le Châble is divided into three districts: Grand Châble (the heart of the village, and even of the entire commune), Les Eplanes (rather residential district, where there is a sports complex (football/tennis)), and le Martinet, which only includes the Juge-Guerin activity zone.

Beaumont is located approximately 8 km from Saint-Julien-en-Genevois, 15 km from Geneva, and 30 km from Annecy.

== Population ==
Historical population
| Year | Pop. | ±% p.a. |
|---|---|---|
| 1968 | 711 | — |
| 1975 | 757 | +0.90% |
| 1982 | 843 | +1.55% |
| 1990 | 1,018 | +2.39% |
| 1999 | 1,293 | +2.69% |
| 2007 | 1,968 | +5.39% |
| 2012 | 2,260 | +2.81% |
| 2017 | 2,838 | +4.66% |
| 2023 | 3,097 | +1.47% |
Source: INSEE

== See also ==
- Communes of the Haute-Savoie department
