= Challonges =

Challonges Chalonjo (Savoyard)
- Commune
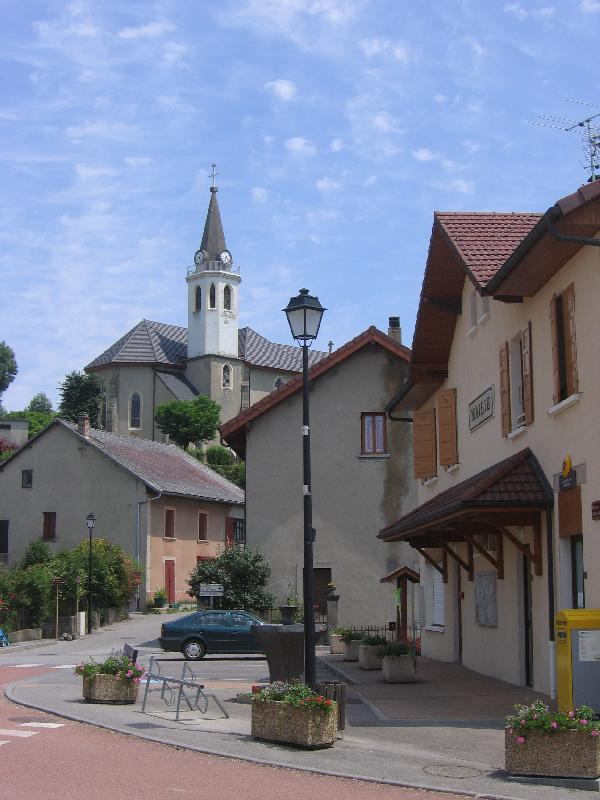
- The centre of Challonges
- Location of Challonges
- Location within France Location within Auvergne-Rhône-Alpes
- Coordinates: 46°01′14″N 5°49′54″E
- Country: France
- Region: Auvergne-Rhône-Alpes
- Department: Haute-Savoie
- Arrondissement: Saint-Julien-en-Genevois
- Canton: Saint-Julien-en-Genevois
- Intercommunality: Usses et Rhône

Government
  - Mayor (2020–2026): Sophie Colas
- Area^{1}: 7.9 km^{2} (3.1 sq mi)
- Highest elevation: 534 m (1,752 ft)
- Lowest elevation: 263 m (863 ft)
- Population (2023): 610
  - Density: 77/km^{2} (200/sq mi)
- Time zone: UTC+01:00 (CET)
  - Summer (DST): UTC+02:00 (CEST)
- INSEE/Postal code: 74055 /74910
- ^{1} French Land Register data, which excludes lakes, ponds, glaciers > 1 km^{2} (0.386 sq mi or 247 acres) and river estuaries.

Challonges (French pronunciation: [ʃalɔ̃ʒ]; Savoyard: Chalonjo) is a commune in the Haute-Savoie department in the Auvergne-Rhône-Alpes region in south-eastern France.

== See also ==
- Communes of the Haute-Savoie department
