= Présilly, Haute-Savoie =

Présilly Prézlyi (Savoyard)
- Commune
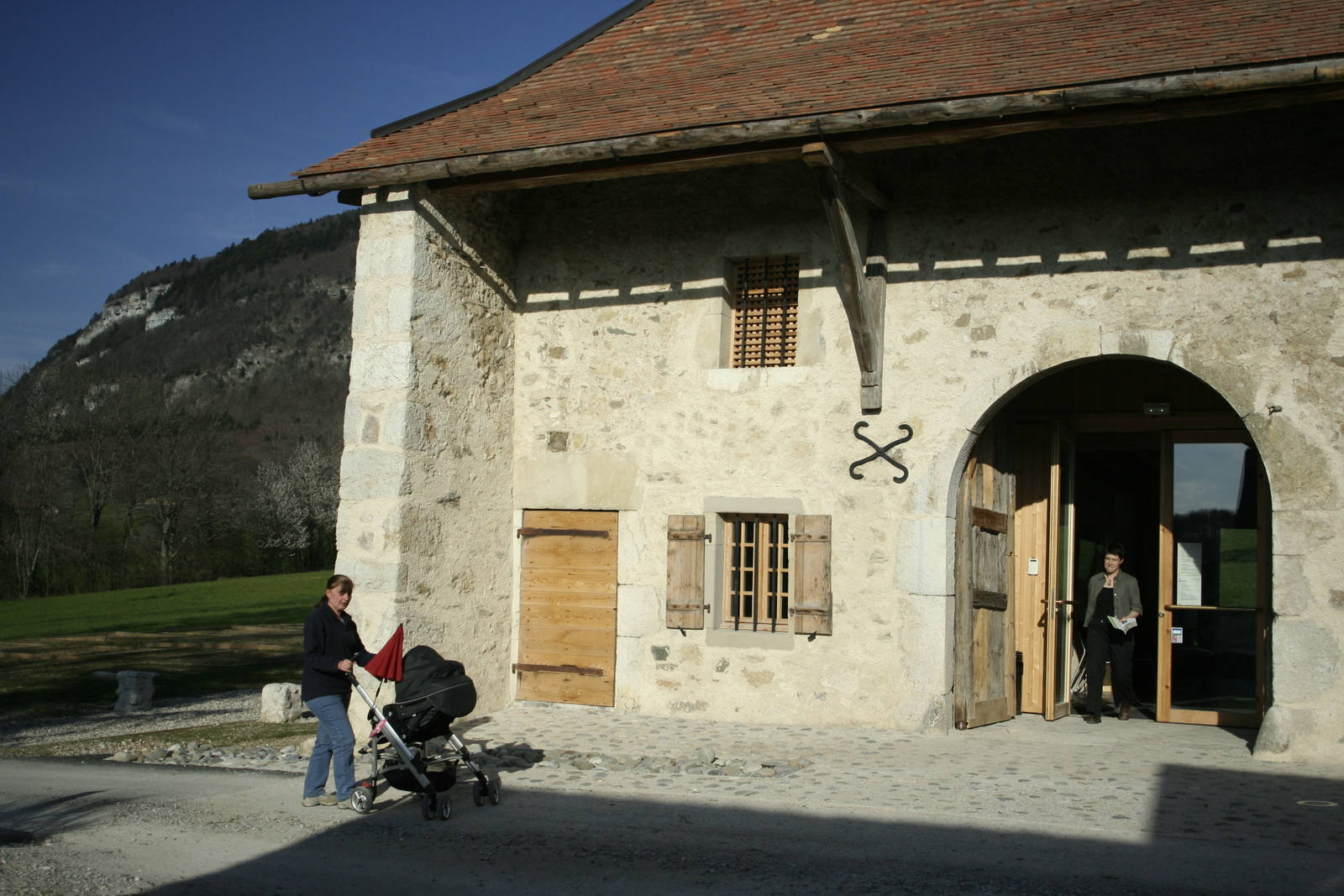
- The house of the Salève, in Présilly

- Coat of arms
- Location of Présilly
- Location within France Location within Auvergne-Rhône-Alpes
- Coordinates: 46°05′38″N 6°04′43″E
- Country: France
- Region: Auvergne-Rhône-Alpes
- Department: Haute-Savoie
- Arrondissement: Saint-Julien-en-Genevois
- Canton: Saint-Julien-en-Genevois
- Intercommunality: Genevois

Government
  - Mayor (2020–2026): Nicolas Duperret
- Area^{1}: 8.66 km^{2} (3.34 sq mi)
- Highest elevation: 1,311 m (4,301 ft)
- Lowest elevation: 594 m (1,949 ft)
- Population (2023): 1,116
  - Density: 129/km^{2} (334/sq mi)
- Demonym: Présilliens / Présilliennes
- Time zone: UTC+01:00 (CET)
  - Summer (DST): UTC+02:00 (CEST)
- INSEE/Postal code: 74216 /74160
- ^{1} French Land Register data, which excludes lakes, ponds, glaciers > 1 km^{2} (0.386 sq mi or 247 acres) and river estuaries.

Présilly (French pronunciation: [pʁeziji]; Savoyard: Prézlyi) is a commune in the Haute-Savoie department in the Auvergne-Rhône-Alpes region in south-eastern France.

== See also ==
- Communes of the Haute-Savoie department
