= Chêne-en-Semine =

Chêne-en-Semine Châno-en-Semena (Arpitan)
- Commune
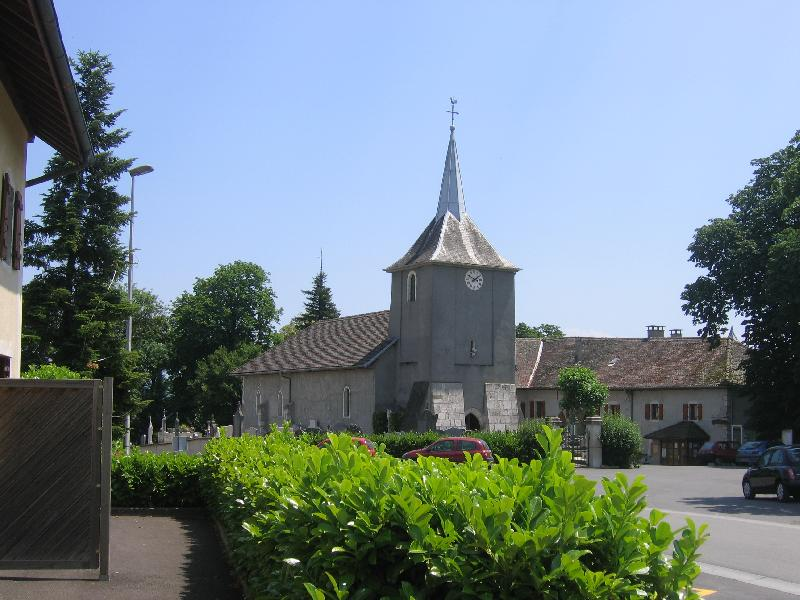
- The church and the village
- Location of Chêne-en-Semine
- Location within France Location within Auvergne-Rhône-Alpes
- Coordinates: 46°02′51″N 5°51′34″E
- Country: France
- Region: Auvergne-Rhône-Alpes
- Department: Haute-Savoie
- Arrondissement: Saint-Julien-en-Genevois
- Canton: Saint-Julien-en-Genevois
- Intercommunality: CC Usses et Rhône

Government
  - Mayor (2020–2026): Paul Rannard
- Area^{1}: 9.46 km^{2} (3.65 sq mi)
- Highest elevation: 553 m (1,814 ft)
- Lowest elevation: 320 m (1,050 ft)
- Population (2023): 544
  - Density: 57.5/km^{2} (149/sq mi)
- Time zone: UTC+01:00 (CET)
  - Summer (DST): UTC+02:00 (CEST)
- INSEE/Postal code: 74068 /74270
- ^{1} French Land Register data, which excludes lakes, ponds, glaciers > 1 km^{2} (0.386 sq mi or 247 acres) and river estuaries.

Chêne-en-Semine (French: [ʃɛːn ɑ̃ səmin]; Arpitan: Châno-en-Semena) is a commune in the Haute-Savoie department in the Auvergne-Rhône-Alpes region in south-eastern France.

== See also ==
- Communes of the Haute-Savoie department
