= Usinens =

Usinens Uzinin (Savoyard)
- Commune
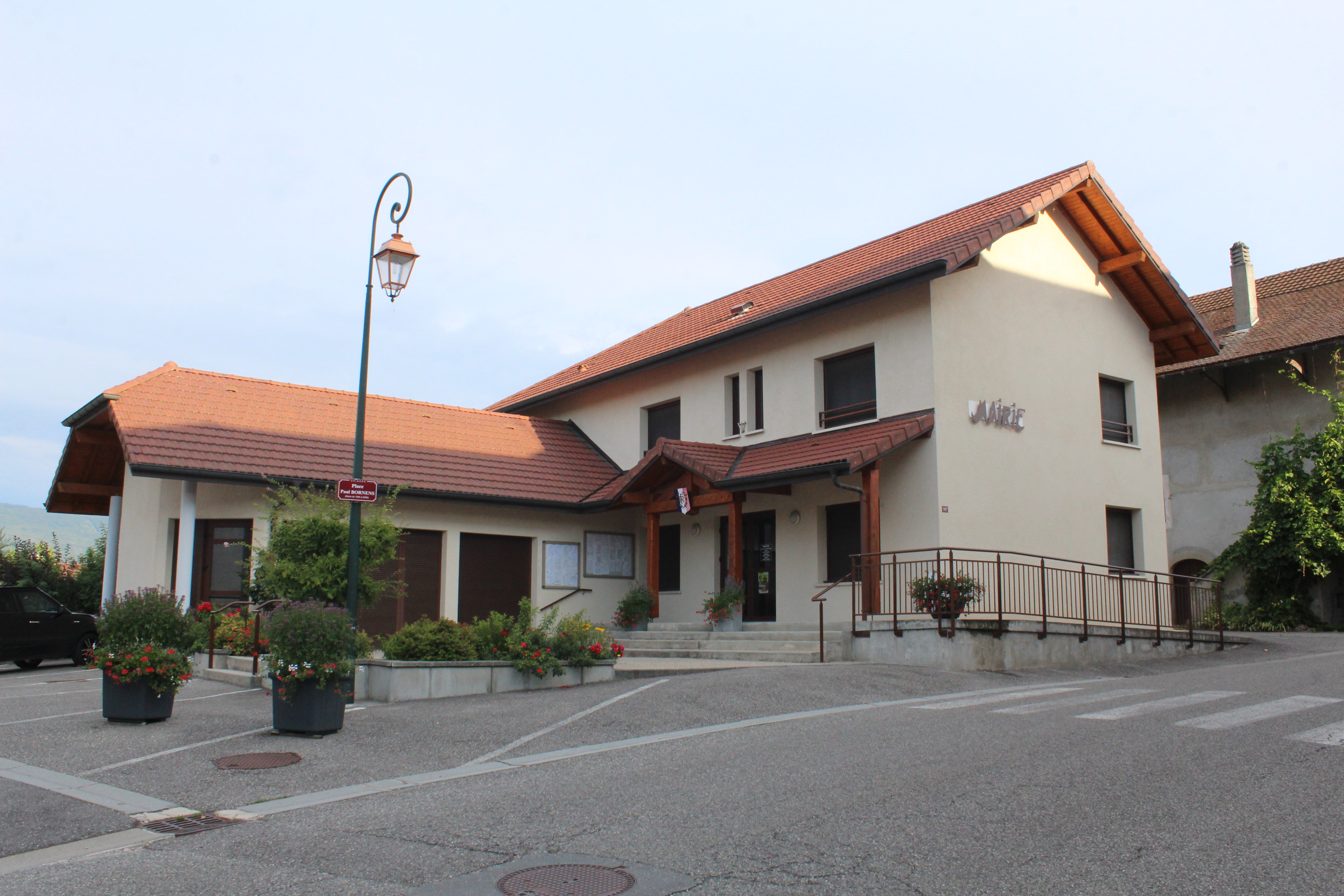
- Town hall
- Location of Usinens
- Location within France Location within Auvergne-Rhône-Alpes
- Coordinates: 46°00′35″N 5°50′31″E
- Country: France
- Region: Auvergne-Rhône-Alpes
- Department: Haute-Savoie
- Arrondissement: Saint-Julien-en-Genevois
- Canton: Saint-Julien-en-Genevois
- Intercommunality: Usses et Rhône

Government
  - Mayor (2020–2026): François Seve
- Area^{1}: 7.63 km^{2} (2.95 sq mi)
- Highest elevation: 528 m (1,732 ft)
- Lowest elevation: 260 m (850 ft)
- Population (2023): 433
  - Density: 56.7/km^{2} (147/sq mi)
- Time zone: UTC+01:00 (CET)
  - Summer (DST): UTC+02:00 (CEST)
- INSEE/Postal code: 74285 /74910
- ^{1} French Land Register data, which excludes lakes, ponds, glaciers > 1 km^{2} (0.386 sq mi or 247 acres) and river estuaries.

Usinens (Savoyard: Uzinin) is a commune in the Haute-Savoie department in the Auvergne-Rhône-Alpes region in south-eastern France.

== See also ==
- Communes of the Haute-Savoie department
