= Contamine-Sarzin =

Contamine-Sarzin Kontamnà (Savoyard)
- Commune
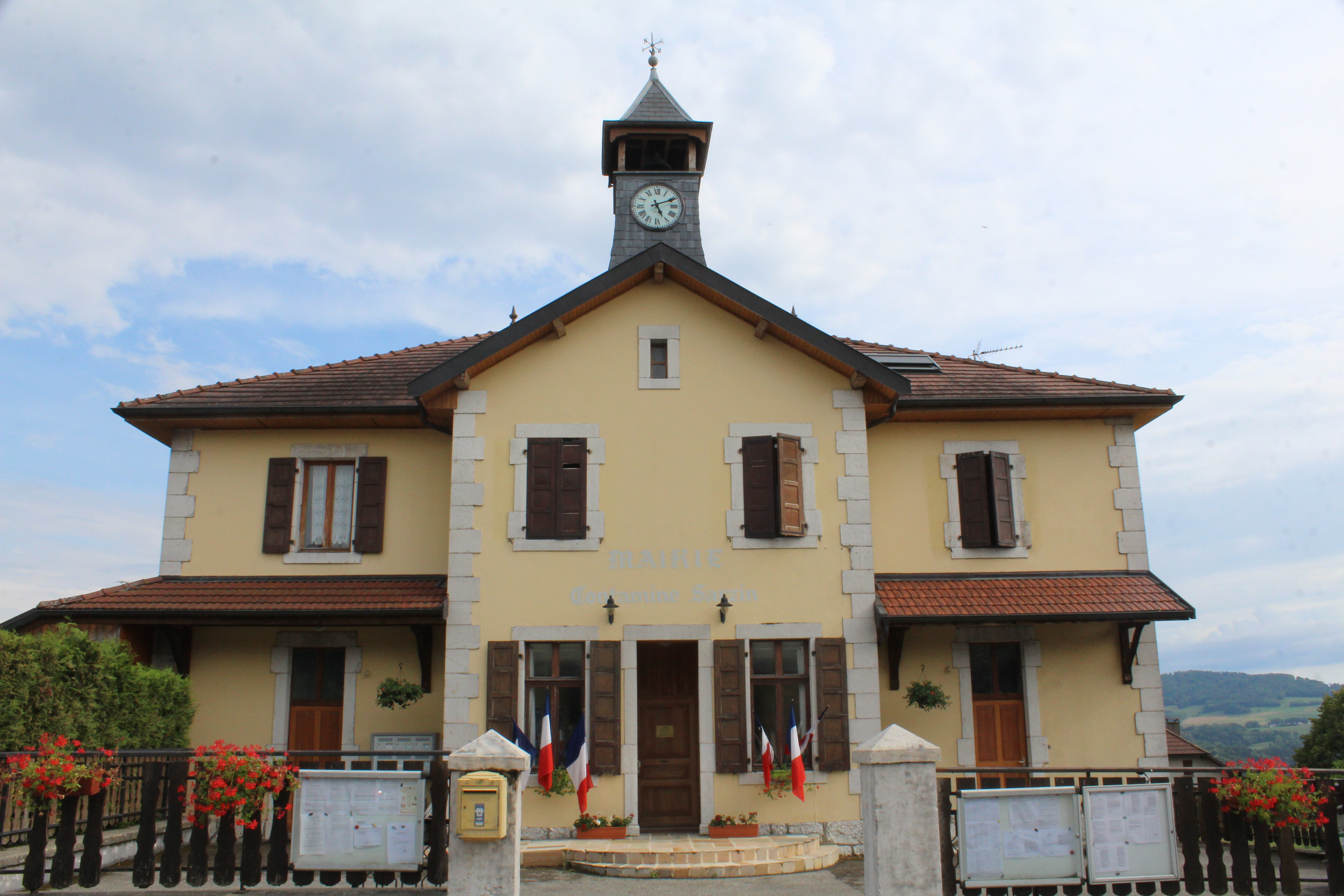
- Town hall

- Coat of arms
- Location of Contamine-Sarzin
- Location within France Location within Auvergne-Rhône-Alpes
- Coordinates: 46°01′31″N 5°58′59″E
- Country: France
- Region: Auvergne-Rhône-Alpes
- Department: Haute-Savoie
- Arrondissement: Saint-Julien-en-Genevois
- Canton: Saint-Julien-en-Genevois
- Intercommunality: CC Usses et Rhône

Government
  - Mayor (2020–2026): Georges Canicatti
- Area^{1}: 6.86 km^{2} (2.65 sq mi)
- Highest elevation: 705 m (2,313 ft)
- Lowest elevation: 342 m (1,122 ft)
- Population (2023): 733
  - Density: 107/km^{2} (277/sq mi)
- Demonym: Contaminois
- Time zone: UTC+01:00 (CET)
  - Summer (DST): UTC+02:00 (CEST)
- INSEE/Postal code: 74086 /74270
- ^{1} French Land Register data, which excludes lakes, ponds, glaciers > 1 km^{2} (0.386 sq mi or 247 acres) and river estuaries.

Contamine-Sarzin (French pronunciation: [kɔ̃tamin saʁzɛ̃]; Savoyard: Kontamnà) is a commune in the Haute-Savoie department in the Auvergne-Rhône-Alpes region in south-eastern France.

== See also ==
- Communes of the Haute-Savoie department
