= Chessenaz =

Chessenaz Shèsnâ (Savoyard)
- Commune
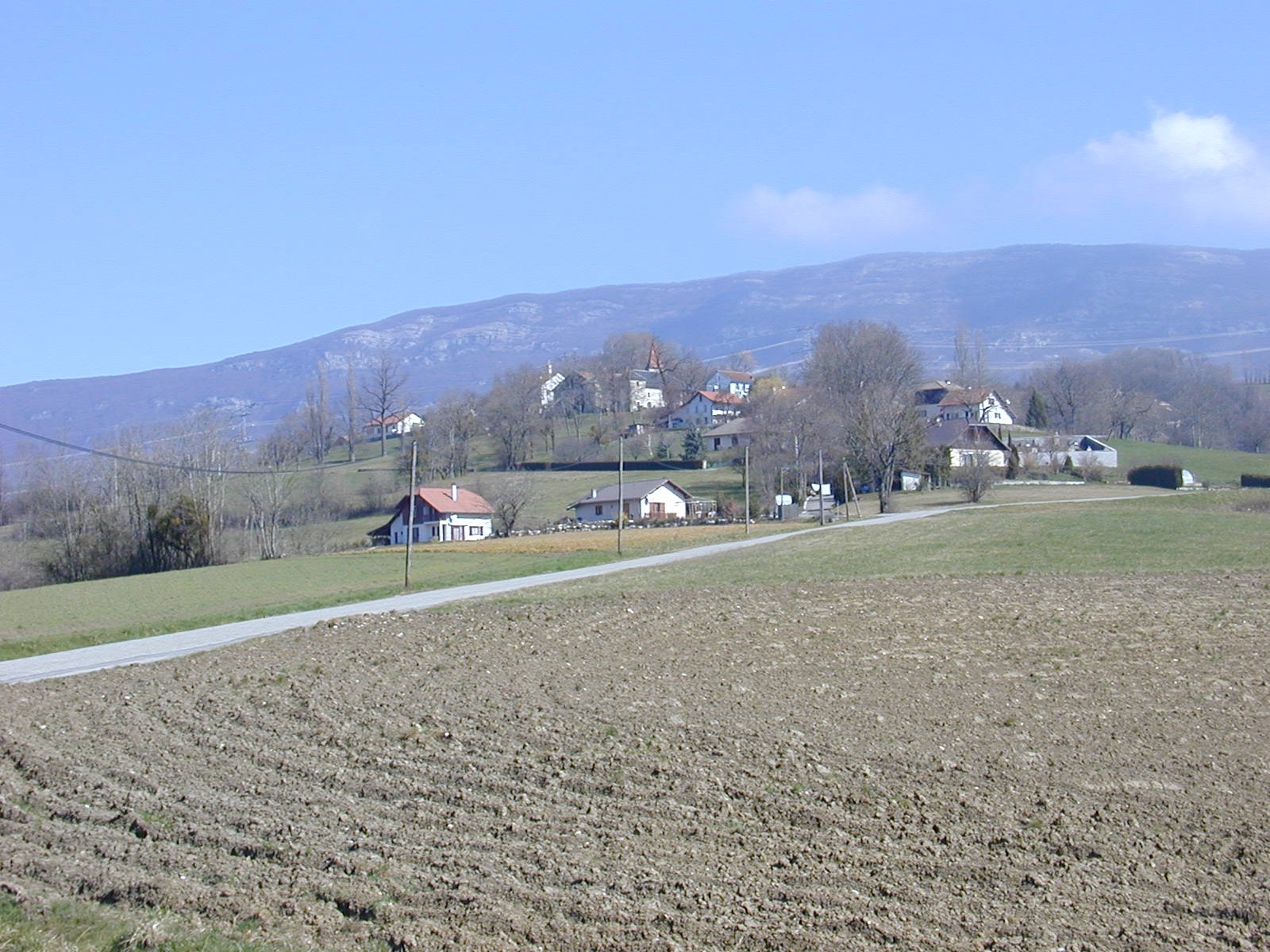
- A general view of Chessenaz

- Coat of arms
- Location of Chessenaz
- Location within France Location within Auvergne-Rhône-Alpes
- Coordinates: 46°02′05″N 5°53′58″E
- Country: France
- Region: Auvergne-Rhône-Alpes
- Department: Haute-Savoie
- Arrondissement: Saint-Julien-en-Genevois
- Canton: Saint-Julien-en-Genevois
- Intercommunality: CC Usses et Rhône

Government
  - Mayor (2020–2026): Philippe Jacqueson
- Area^{1}: 5.23 km^{2} (2.02 sq mi)
- Highest elevation: 595 m (1,952 ft)
- Lowest elevation: 290 m (950 ft)
- Population (2023): 239
  - Density: 45.7/km^{2} (118/sq mi)
- Demonym: Chesseniens
- Time zone: UTC+01:00 (CET)
  - Summer (DST): UTC+02:00 (CEST)
- INSEE/Postal code: 74071 /270
- ^{1} French Land Register data, which excludes lakes, ponds, glaciers > 1 km^{2} (0.386 sq mi or 247 acres) and river estuaries.

Chessenaz (Savoyard: Shèsnâ) is a commune in the Haute-Savoie department and Auvergne-Rhône-Alpes region of eastern France.

== Toponymy ==
As with many polysyllabic Arpitan toponyms or anthroponyms, the final -x marks oxytonic stress (on the last syllable), whereas the final -z indicates paroxytonic stress (on the penultimate syllable) and should not be pronounced, although in French it is often mispronounced due to hypercorrection.

== See also ==
- Communes of the Haute-Savoie department
