= Feigères =

Feigères Fiogiéres (Arpitan)
- Commune
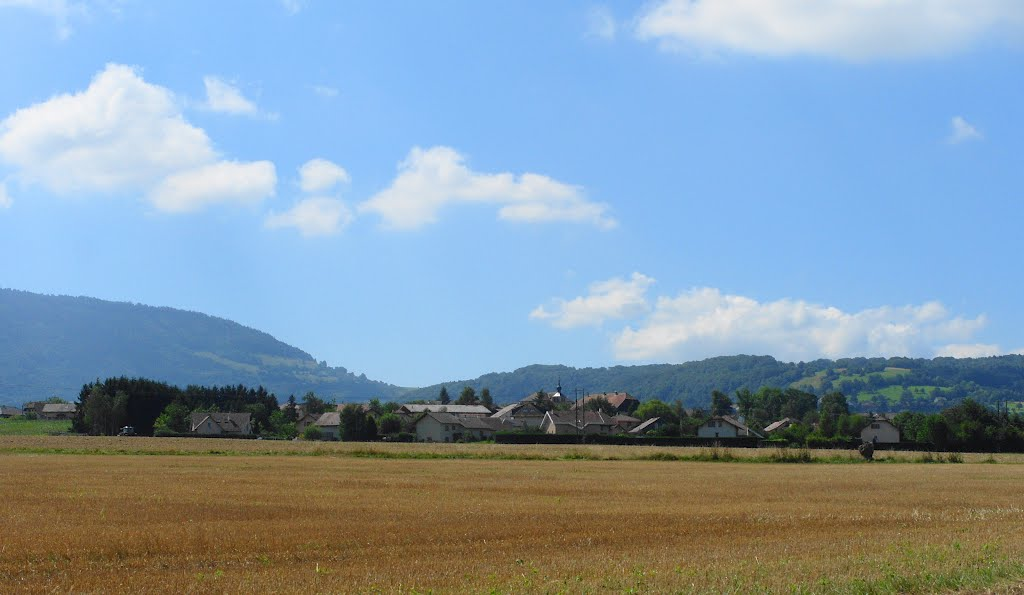
- A general view of Feigères

- Coat of arms
- Location of Feigères
- Location within France Location within Auvergne-Rhône-Alpes
- Coordinates: 46°06′49″N 6°04′53″E
- Country: France
- Region: Auvergne-Rhône-Alpes
- Department: Haute-Savoie
- Arrondissement: Saint-Julien-en-Genevois
- Canton: Saint-Julien-en-Genevois
- Intercommunality: CC du Genevois

Government
  - Mayor (2020–2026): Myriam Grats
- Area^{1}: 7.66 km^{2} (2.96 sq mi)
- Highest elevation: 680 m (2,230 ft)
- Lowest elevation: 453 m (1,486 ft)
- Population (2023): 1,879
  - Density: 245/km^{2} (635/sq mi)
- Time zone: UTC+01:00 (CET)
  - Summer (DST): UTC+02:00 (CEST)
- INSEE/Postal code: 74124 /74160
- ^{1} French Land Register data, which excludes lakes, ponds, glaciers > 1 km^{2} (0.386 sq mi or 247 acres) and river estuaries.

Feigères (French pronunciation: [fɛʒɛʁ]; Arpitan: Fiogiéres) is a commune in the Haute-Savoie department in the Auvergne-Rhône-Alpes region in south-eastern France.

== See also ==
- Communes of the Haute-Savoie department
