= Éloise =

Éloise Élouéze (Savoyard)
- Commune
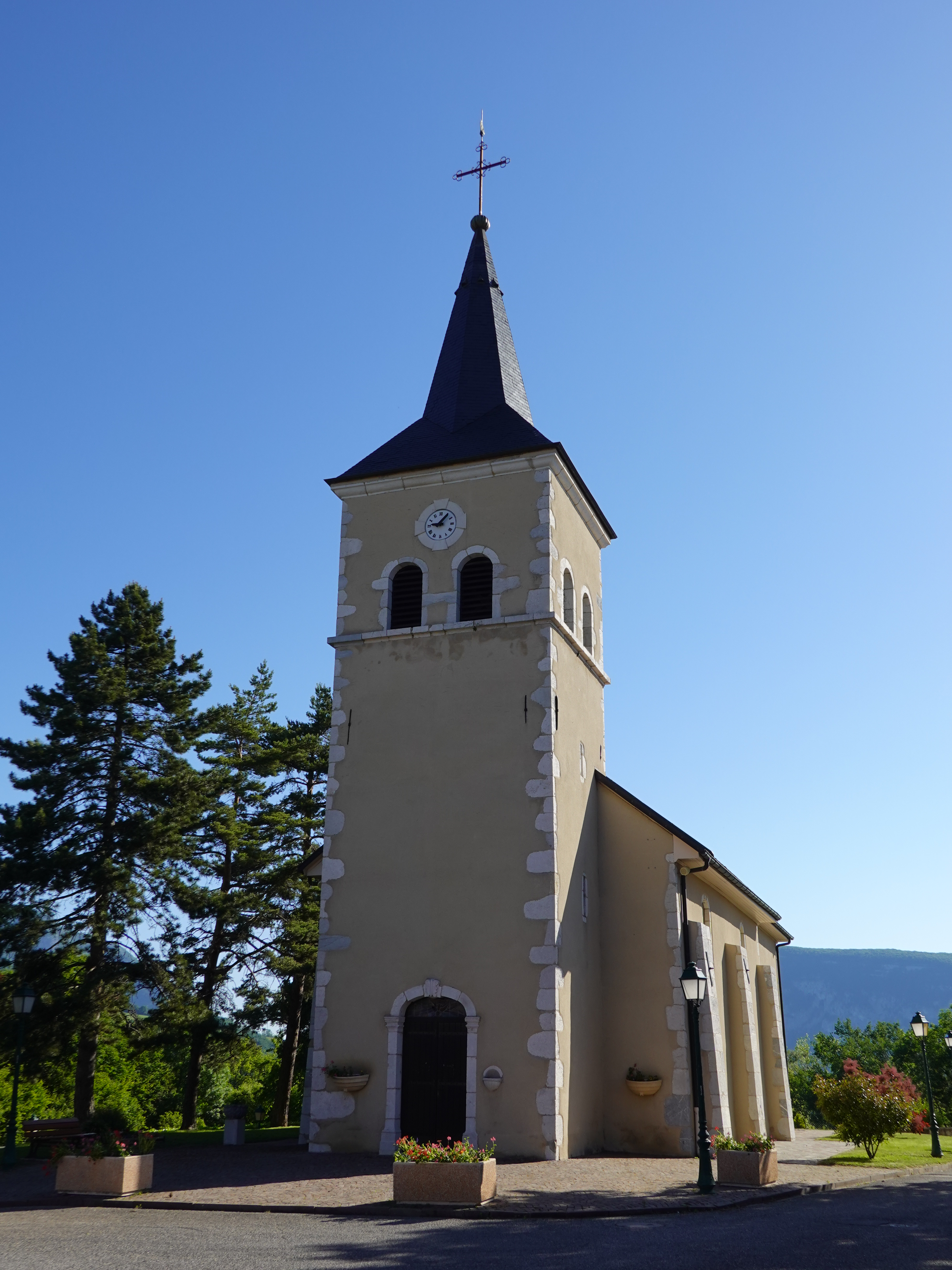
- Church of Saint-Vincent

- Coat of arms
- Location of Éloise
- Location within France Location within Auvergne-Rhône-Alpes
- Coordinates: 46°04′51″N 5°51′33″E
- Country: France
- Region: Auvergne-Rhône-Alpes
- Department: Haute-Savoie
- Arrondissement: Saint-Julien-en-Genevois
- Canton: Saint-Julien-en-Genevois
- Intercommunality: CC Usses et Rhône

Government
  - Mayor (2020–2026): Didier Clerc
- Area^{1}: 8.95 km^{2} (3.46 sq mi)
- Highest elevation: 533 m (1,749 ft)
- Lowest elevation: 330 m (1,080 ft)
- Population (2023): 931
  - Density: 104/km^{2} (269/sq mi)
- Time zone: UTC+01:00 (CET)
  - Summer (DST): UTC+02:00 (CEST)
- INSEE/Postal code: 74109 /01200
- ^{1} French Land Register data, which excludes lakes, ponds, glaciers > 1 km^{2} (0.386 sq mi or 247 acres) and river estuaries.

Éloise (French pronunciation: [elwaz]; Savoyard: Élouéze) is a commune in the Haute-Savoie department in the Auvergne-Rhône-Alpes region in south-eastern France.

== See also ==
- Communes of the Haute-Savoie department
