= Archamps =

Archamps Arshan (Savoyard)
- Commune
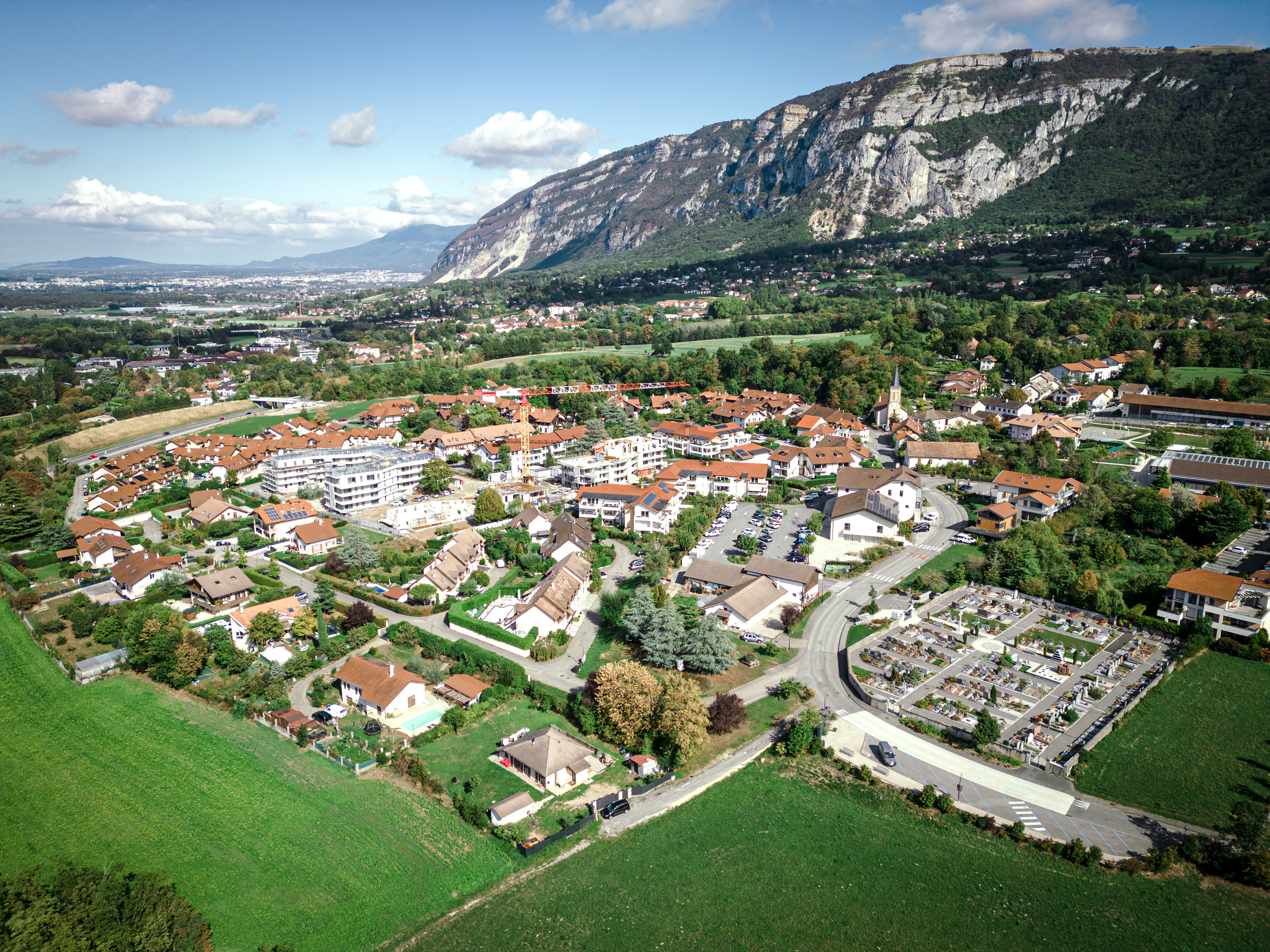
- Aerial view of Archamps

- Coat of arms
- Location of Archamps
- Location within France Location within Auvergne-Rhône-Alpes
- Coordinates: 46°08′11″N 6°07′59″E
- Country: France
- Region: Auvergne-Rhône-Alpes
- Department: Haute-Savoie
- Arrondissement: Saint-Julien-en-Genevois
- Canton: Saint-Julien-en-Genevois
- Intercommunality: CC du Genevois

Government
  - Mayor (2020–2026): Anne Riesen
- Area^{1}: 10.69 km^{2} (4.13 sq mi)
- Highest elevation: 1,350 m (4,430 ft)
- Lowest elevation: 482 m (1,581 ft)
- Population (2023): 2,375
  - Density: 222.2/km^{2} (575.4/sq mi)
- Demonym: Archampois / Archampoise
- Time zone: UTC+01:00 (CET)
  - Summer (DST): UTC+02:00 (CEST)
- INSEE/Postal code: 74016 /74160
- ^{1} French Land Register data, which excludes lakes, ponds, glaciers > 1 km^{2} (0.386 sq mi or 247 acres) and river estuaries.

Archamps (French pronunciation: [aʁʃɑ̃]; Savoyard: Arshan) is a commune in the Haute-Savoie department in the Auvergne-Rhône-Alpes region in south-eastern France. As of 2020, it is the commune with the second highest median per capita income (€53,330 per year) in France.

== Population ==
Historical population
| Year | Pop. | ±% p.a. |
|---|---|---|
| 1968 | 724 | — |
| 1975 | 874 | +2.73% |
| 1982 | 1,005 | +2.02% |
| 1990 | 1,070 | +0.79% |
| 1999 | 1,235 | +1.61% |
| 2007 | 1,693 | +4.02% |
| 2012 | 2,472 | +7.86% |
| 2017 | 2,556 | +0.67% |
| 2023 | 2,375 | −1.22% |
Source: INSEE

== See also ==
- Communes of the Haute-Savoie department
