= Marlioz =

Marlioz Marlyo (Savoyard)
- Commune
- Coat of arms
- Location of Marlioz
- Location within France Location within Auvergne-Rhône-Alpes
- Coordinates: 46°01′59″N 6°00′15″E
- Country: France
- Region: Auvergne-Rhône-Alpes
- Department: Haute-Savoie
- Arrondissement: Saint-Julien-en-Genevois
- Canton: Saint-Julien-en-Genevois
- Intercommunality: CC Usses et Rhône

Government
  - Mayor (2020–2026): Vincent Dutoit
- Area^{1}: 8.12 km^{2} (3.14 sq mi)
- Highest elevation: 630 m (2,070 ft)
- Lowest elevation: 366 m (1,201 ft)
- Population (2023): 1,062
  - Density: 131/km^{2} (339/sq mi)
- Time zone: UTC+01:00 (CET)
  - Summer (DST): UTC+02:00 (CEST)
- INSEE/Postal code: 74168 /74270
- ^{1} French Land Register data, which excludes lakes, ponds, glaciers > 1 km^{2} (0.386 sq mi or 247 acres) and river estuaries.

Marlioz (Savoyard: Marlyo) is a commune in the Haute-Savoie department in the Auvergne-Rhône-Alpes region in south-eastern France.

== Toponymy ==
As with many polysyllabic Arpitan toponyms or anthroponyms, the final -x marks oxytonic stress (on the last syllable), whereas the final -z indicates paroxytonic stress (on the penultimate syllable) and should not be pronounced, although in French it is often mispronounced due to hypercorrection.

== See also ==
- Communes of the Haute-Savoie department
