= Bassy =

Bassy Bassi (Savoyard)
- Commune
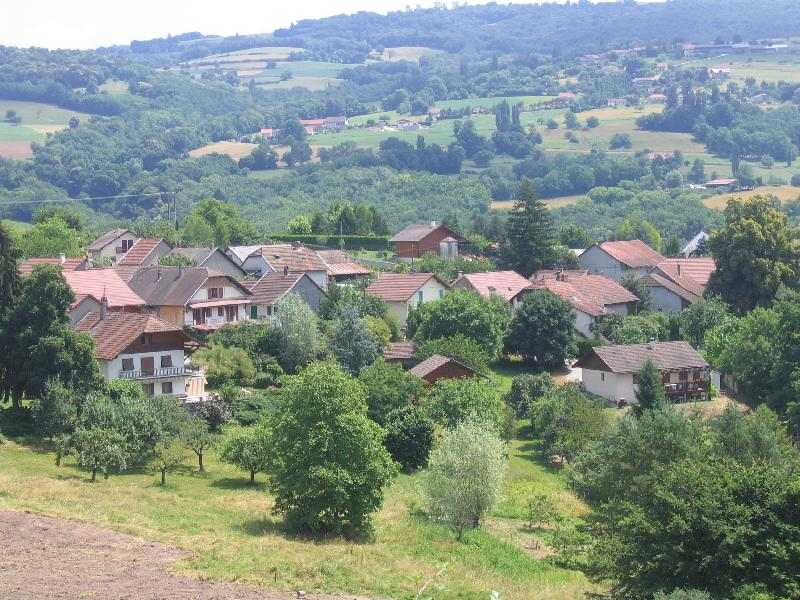
- The village of Bassy
- Location of Bassy
- Location within France Location within Auvergne-Rhône-Alpes
- Coordinates: 45°58′54″N 5°49′49″E
- Country: France
- Region: Auvergne-Rhône-Alpes
- Department: Haute-Savoie
- Arrondissement: Saint-Julien-en-Genevois
- Canton: Saint-Julien-en-Genevois
- Intercommunality: Usses et Rhône

Government
  - Mayor (2020–2026): Rémi Poncet
- Area^{1}: 7.57 km^{2} (2.92 sq mi)
- Highest elevation: 442 m (1,450 ft)
- Lowest elevation: 260 m (850 ft)
- Population (2023): 423
  - Density: 55.9/km^{2} (145/sq mi)
- Time zone: UTC+01:00 (CET)
  - Summer (DST): UTC+02:00 (CEST)
- INSEE/Postal code: 74029 /74910
- ^{1} French Land Register data, which excludes lakes, ponds, glaciers > 1 km^{2} (0.386 sq mi or 247 acres) and river estuaries.

Bassy (French pronunciation: [basi]; Savoyard: Bassi) is a commune in the Haute-Savoie department in the Auvergne-Rhône-Alpes region in south-eastern France.

== See also ==
- Communes of the Haute-Savoie department
