= Franclens =

Franclens Franklyin (Savoyard)
- Commune
- Location of Franclens
- Location within France Location within Auvergne-Rhône-Alpes
- Coordinates: 46°02′36″N 5°49′49″E
- Country: France
- Region: Auvergne-Rhône-Alpes
- Department: Haute-Savoie
- Arrondissement: Saint-Julien-en-Genevois
- Canton: Saint-Julien-en-Genevois
- Intercommunality: CC Usses et Rhône

Government
  - Mayor (2020–2026): Jean-Louis Magnin
- Area^{1}: 5.37 km^{2} (2.07 sq mi)
- Elevation: 483 m (1,585 ft)
- Highest elevation: 544 m (1,785 ft)
- Lowest elevation: 268 m (879 ft)
- Population (2023): 541
  - Density: 101/km^{2} (261/sq mi)
- Time zone: UTC+01:00 (CET)
  - Summer (DST): UTC+02:00 (CEST)
- INSEE/Postal code: 74130 /74910
- ^{1} French Land Register data, which excludes lakes, ponds, glaciers > 1 km^{2} (0.386 sq mi or 247 acres) and river estuaries.

Franclens (Savoyard: Franklyin) is a commune in the Haute-Savoie department in the Auvergne-Rhône-Alpes region in south-eastern France.

== See also ==
- Communes of the Haute-Savoie department
