= Saint-Germain-sur-Rhône =

Saint-Germain-sur-Rhône San-Zharmin (Savoyard)
- Commune
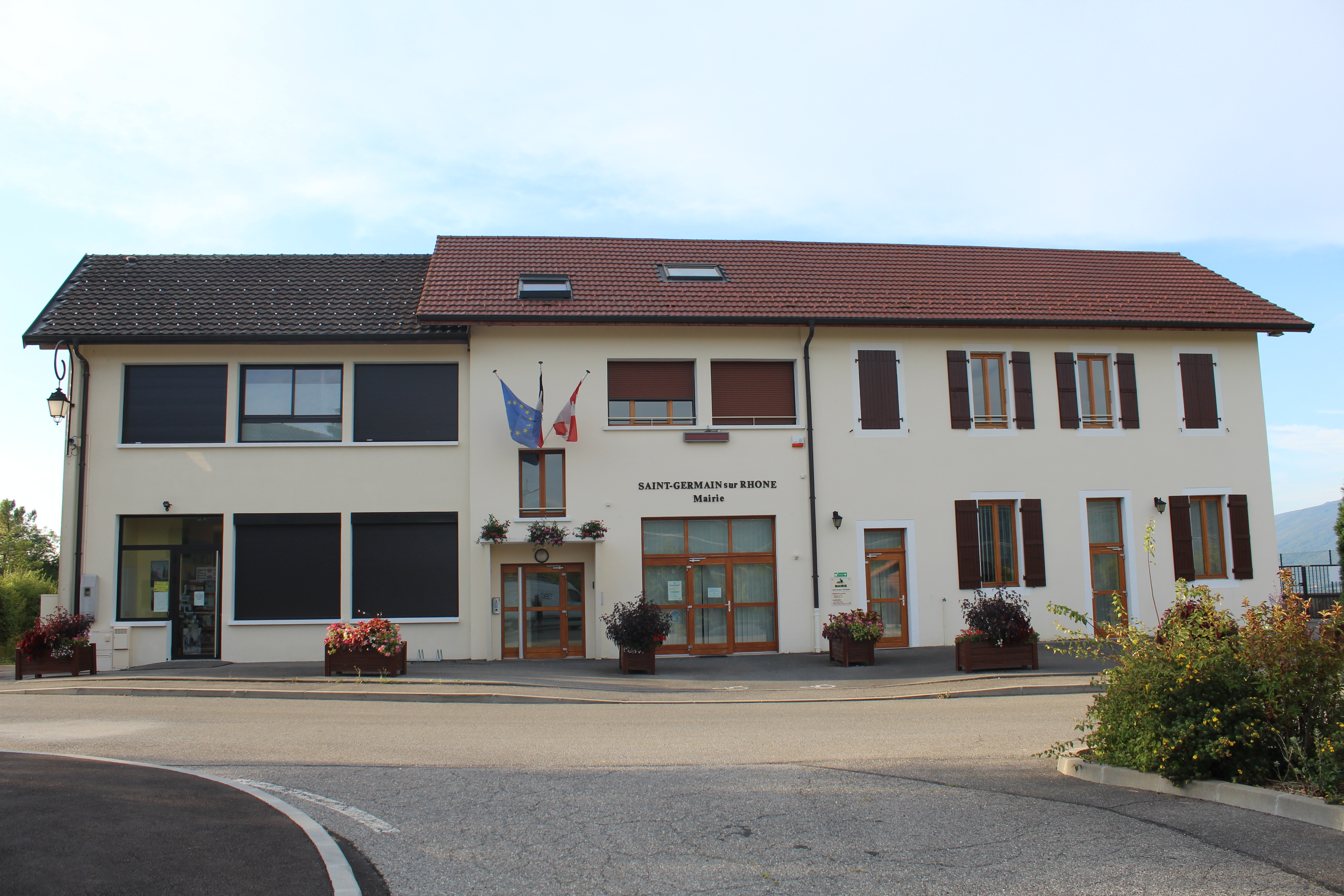
- Town hall
- Location of Saint-Germain-sur-Rhône
- Location within France Location within Auvergne-Rhône-Alpes
- Coordinates: 46°04′03″N 5°48′54″E
- Country: France
- Region: Auvergne-Rhône-Alpes
- Department: Haute-Savoie
- Arrondissement: Saint-Julien-en-Genevois
- Canton: Saint-Julien-en-Genevois
- Intercommunality: CC Usses et Rhône

Government
  - Mayor (2020–2026): Alain Lambert
- Area^{1}: 7.85 km^{2} (3.03 sq mi)
- Highest elevation: 537 m (1,762 ft)
- Lowest elevation: 322 m (1,056 ft)
- Population (2023): 646
  - Density: 82.3/km^{2} (213/sq mi)
- Time zone: UTC+01:00 (CET)
  - Summer (DST): UTC+02:00 (CEST)
- INSEE/Postal code: 74235 /74910
- ^{1} French Land Register data, which excludes lakes, ponds, glaciers > 1 km^{2} (0.386 sq mi or 247 acres) and river estuaries.

Saint-Germain-sur-Rhône (French pronunciation: [sɛ̃ ʒɛʁmɛ̃ syʁ ʁon], literally Saint-Germain on Rhône; Savoyard: San-Zharmin) is a commune in the Haute-Savoie department and Auvergne-Rhône-Alpes region of eastern France.

== See also ==
- Communes of the Haute-Savoie department
