= Chavannaz =

Chavannaz Shavana (Savoyard)
- Commune
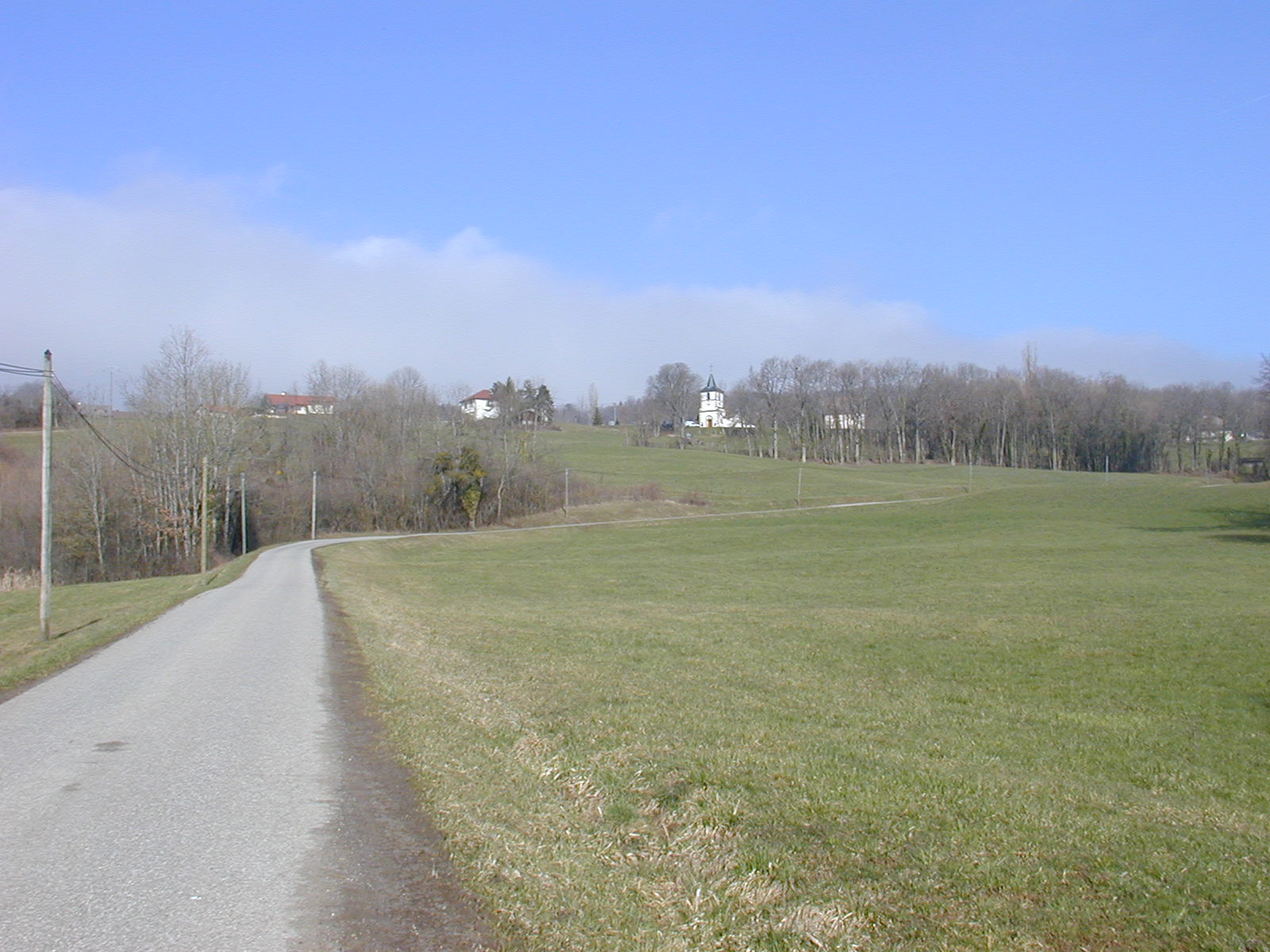
- A general view of Chavannaz

- Coat of arms
- Location of Chavannaz
- Location within France Location within Auvergne-Rhône-Alpes
- Coordinates: 46°03′05″N 6°01′01″E
- Country: France
- Region: Auvergne-Rhône-Alpes
- Department: Haute-Savoie
- Arrondissement: Saint-Julien-en-Genevois
- Canton: Saint-Julien-en-Genevois
- Intercommunality: CC Usses et Rhône

Government
  - Mayor (2020–2026): Alain Camp
- Area^{1}: 3.17 km^{2} (1.22 sq mi)
- Highest elevation: 703 m (2,306 ft)
- Lowest elevation: 438 m (1,437 ft)
- Population (2023): 249
  - Density: 78.5/km^{2} (203/sq mi)
- Time zone: UTC+01:00 (CET)
  - Summer (DST): UTC+02:00 (CEST)
- INSEE/Postal code: 74066 /74270
- ^{1} French Land Register data, which excludes lakes, ponds, glaciers > 1 km^{2} (0.386 sq mi or 247 acres) and river estuaries.

Chavannaz (Savoyard: Shavana) is a commune in the Haute-Savoie department in the Auvergne-Rhône-Alpes region in south-eastern France.

== Toponymy ==
As with many polysyllabic Arpitan toponyms or anthroponyms, the final -x marks oxytonic stress (on the last syllable), whereas the final -z indicates paroxytonic stress (on the penultimate syllable) and should not be pronounced, although in French it is often mispronounced due to hypercorrection.

== See also ==
- Communes of the Haute-Savoie department
