= Neydens =

Neydens Nédin (Savoyard)
- Commune
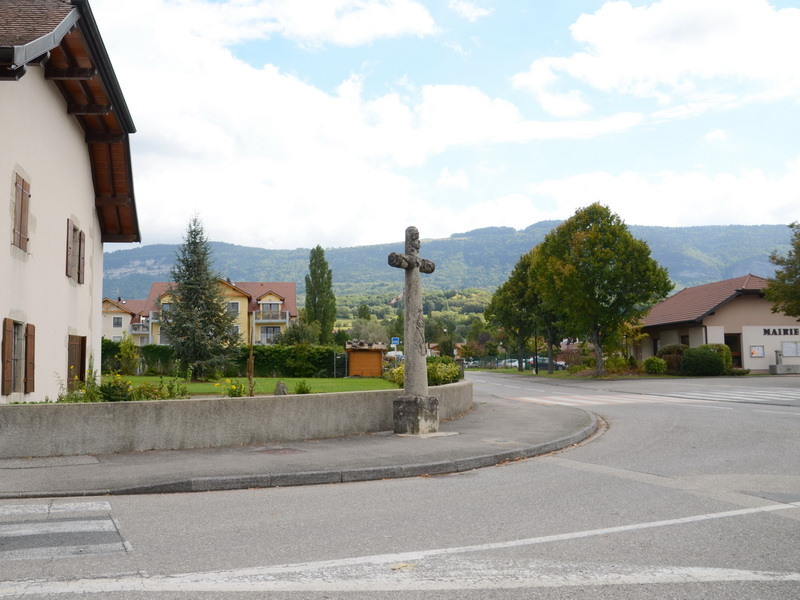
- The Cross of Verrières, in Neydens

- Coat of arms
- Location of Neydens
- Location within France Location within Auvergne-Rhône-Alpes
- Coordinates: 46°07′20″N 6°06′18″E
- Country: France
- Region: Auvergne-Rhône-Alpes
- Department: Haute-Savoie
- Arrondissement: Saint-Julien-en-Genevois
- Canton: Saint-Julien-en-Genevois
- Intercommunality: CC du Genevois

Government
  - Mayor (2020–2026): Carole Vincent
- Area^{1}: 6.96 km^{2} (2.69 sq mi)
- Highest elevation: 871 m (2,858 ft)
- Lowest elevation: 500 m (1,600 ft)
- Population (2023): 2,250
  - Density: 323/km^{2} (837/sq mi)
- Time zone: UTC+01:00 (CET)
  - Summer (DST): UTC+02:00 (CEST)
- INSEE/Postal code: 74201 /74160
- ^{1} French Land Register data, which excludes lakes, ponds, glaciers > 1 km^{2} (0.386 sq mi or 247 acres) and river estuaries.

Neydens (French pronunciation: [nɛdɑ̃]; Savoyard: Nédin) is a commune in the Haute-Savoie department in the Auvergne-Rhône-Alpes region in south-eastern France.

Due to its close proximity to Geneva (Switzerland), Neydens is a popular tourist destination.

== Population ==
Historical population
Year	Pop.	±% p.a.
1968	455	—
1975	714	+6.65%
1982	840	+2.35%
1990	957	+1.64%
1999	1,100	+1.56%
2007	1,431	+3.34%
2012	1,617	+2.47%
2017	1,915	+3.44%
2023	2,250	+2.72%
Source: INSEE

== See also ==
- Communes of the Haute-Savoie department
