= Musièges =

- Commune
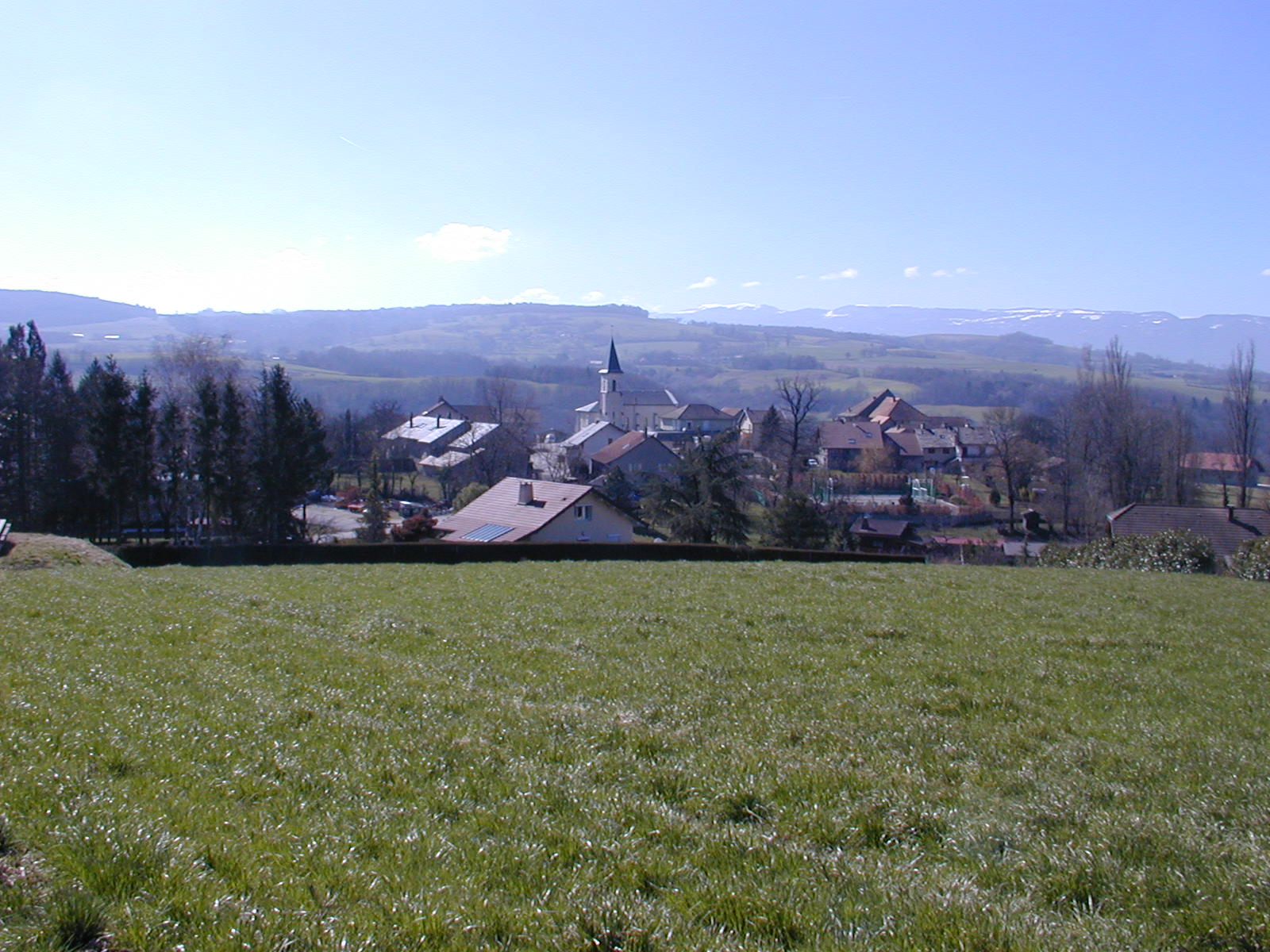
- View from the slopes of Mont de Musièges

- Coat of arms
- Location of Musièges
- Location within France Location within Auvergne-Rhône-Alpes
- Coordinates: 46°00′58″N 5°57′14″E
- Country: France
- Region: Auvergne-Rhône-Alpes
- Department: Haute-Savoie
- Arrondissement: Saint-Julien-en-Genevois
- Canton: Saint-Julien-en-Genevois
- Intercommunality: CC Usses et Rhône

Government
  - Mayor (2020–2026): Pascal Coulloux
- Area^{1}: 2.98 km^{2} (1.15 sq mi)
- Highest elevation: 705 m (2,313 ft)
- Lowest elevation: 323 m (1,060 ft)
- Population (2023): 422
  - Density: 142/km^{2} (367/sq mi)
- Demonym: Musiègeois / Musiègeoise
- Time zone: UTC+01:00 (CET)
  - Summer (DST): UTC+02:00 (CEST)
- INSEE/Postal code: 74195 /74270
- ^{1} French Land Register data, which excludes lakes, ponds, glaciers > 1 km^{2} (0.386 sq mi or 247 acres) and river estuaries.

Musièges (French pronunciation: [myzjɛʒ]; Arpitan: Mozêzho) is a commune in the Haute-Savoie department in the Auvergne-Rhône-Alpes region in south-eastern France.

== See also ==
- Communes of the Haute-Savoie department
