= Clermont, Haute-Savoie =

Clermont Klyarmon (Savoyard)
- Commune
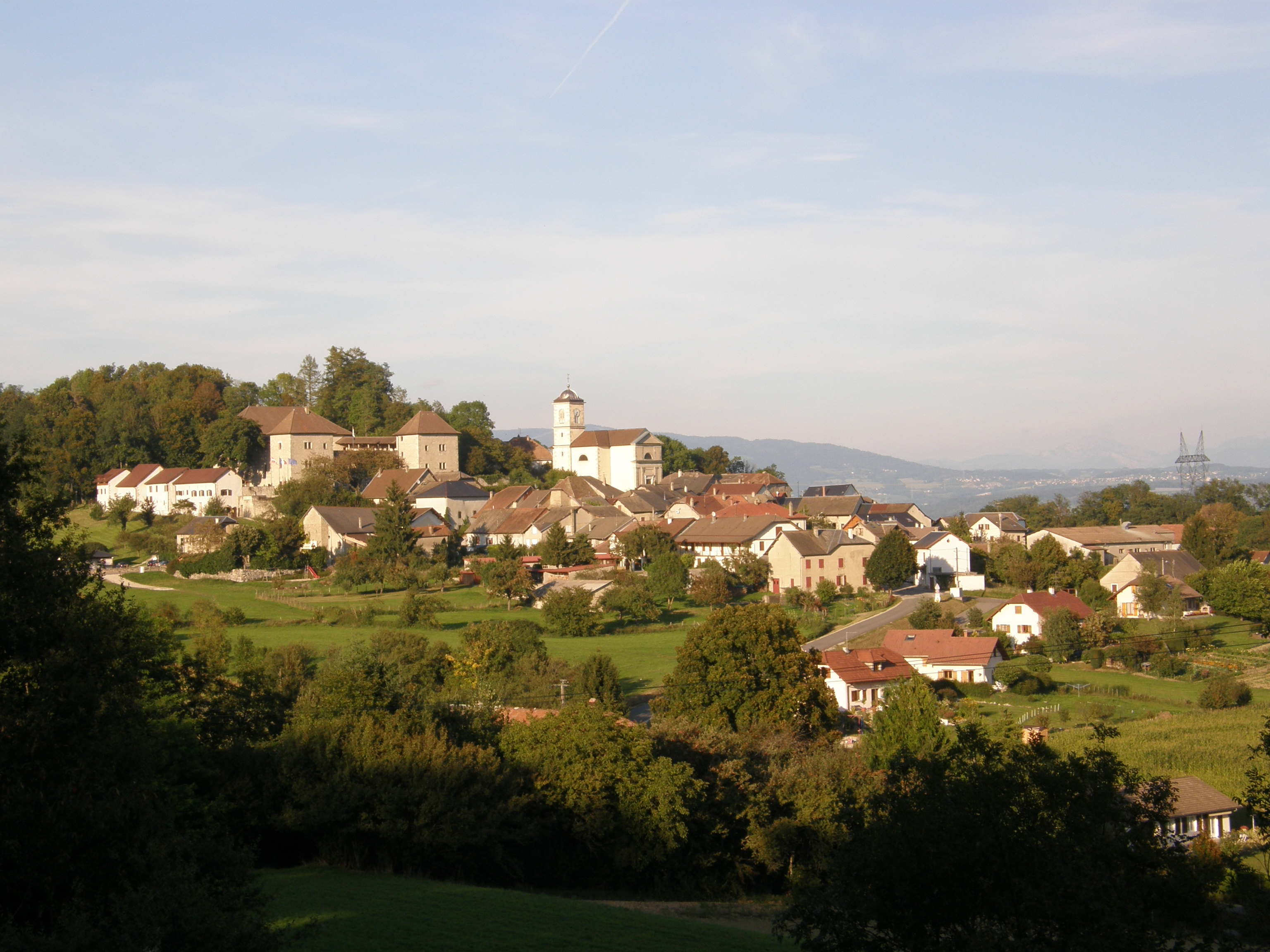
- A panoramic view of the village of Clermont

- Coat of arms
- Location of Clermont
- Location within France Location within Auvergne-Rhône-Alpes
- Coordinates: 45°58′22″N 5°54′32″E
- Country: France
- Region: Auvergne-Rhône-Alpes
- Department: Haute-Savoie
- Arrondissement: Saint-Julien-en-Genevois
- Canton: Saint-Julien-en-Genevois
- Intercommunality: Usses et Rhône

Government
  - Mayor (2020–2026): Christian Vermelle
- Area^{1}: 6.98 km^{2} (2.69 sq mi)
- Highest elevation: 699 m (2,293 ft)
- Lowest elevation: 500 m (1,600 ft)
- Population (2023): 474
  - Density: 67.9/km^{2} (176/sq mi)
- Time zone: UTC+01:00 (CET)
  - Summer (DST): UTC+02:00 (CEST)
- INSEE/Postal code: 74078 /74270
- ^{1} French Land Register data, which excludes lakes, ponds, glaciers > 1 km^{2} (0.386 sq mi or 247 acres) and river estuaries.

Clermont en Genevois (French pronunciation: [klɛʁmɔ̃]; Savoyard: Klyarmon) is a commune in the Haute-Savoie department in the Auvergne-Rhône-Alpes region in south-eastern France.

== See also ==
- Communes of the Haute-Savoie department
