= Vers, Haute-Savoie =

Vers Vé (Savoyard)
- Commune
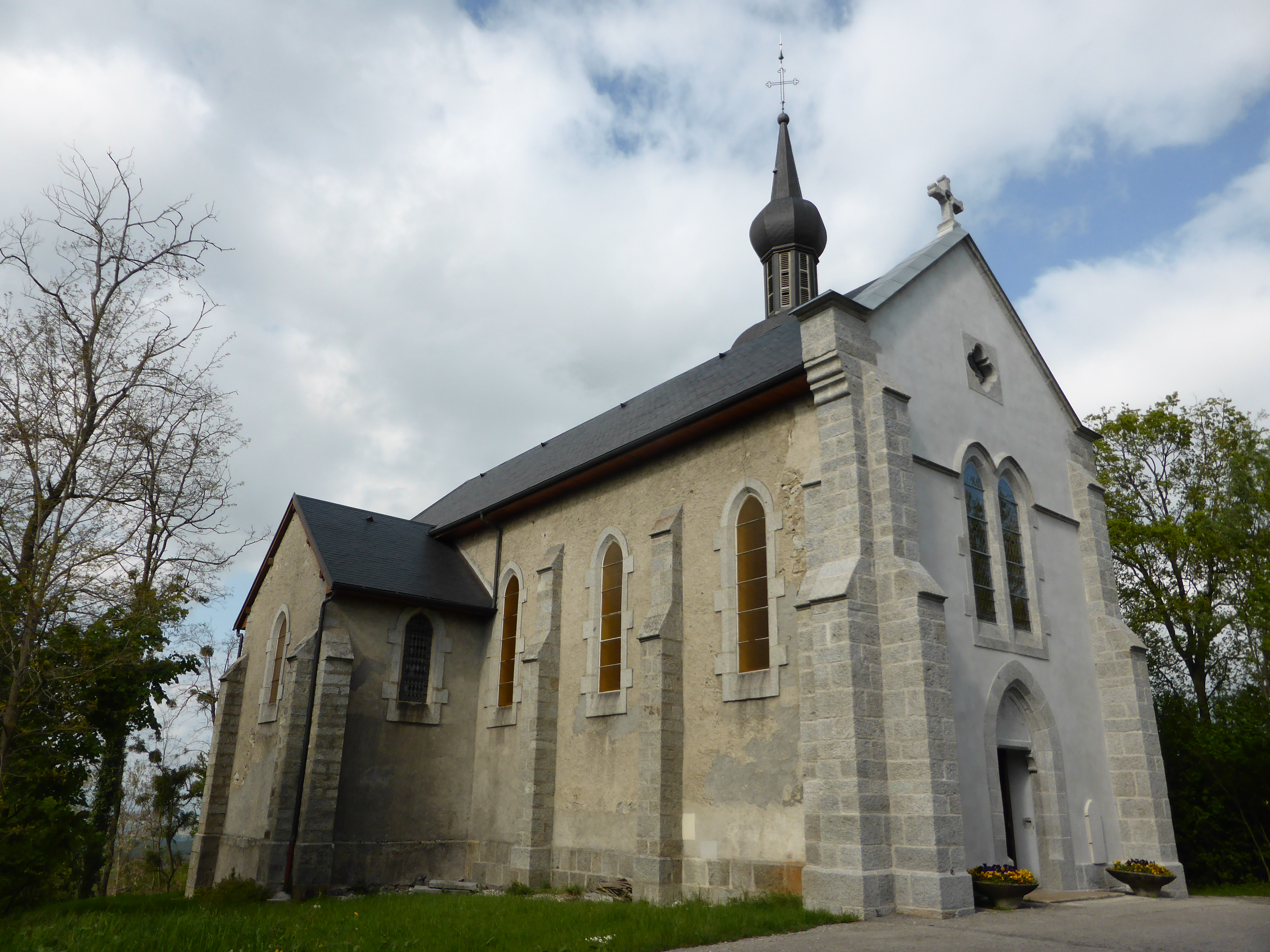
- The church in Vers

- Coat of arms
- Location of Vers
- Location within France Location within Auvergne-Rhône-Alpes
- Coordinates: 46°05′31″N 6°01′21″E
- Country: France
- Region: Auvergne-Rhône-Alpes
- Department: Haute-Savoie
- Arrondissement: Saint-Julien-en-Genevois
- Canton: Saint-Julien-en-Genevois
- Intercommunality: CC du Genevois

Government
  - Mayor (2020–2026): Joëlle Lavorel
- Area^{1}: 5.91 km^{2} (2.28 sq mi)
- Elevation: 635 m (2,083 ft)
- Highest elevation: 821 m (2,694 ft)
- Lowest elevation: 530 m (1,740 ft)
- Population (2023): 975
  - Density: 165/km^{2} (427/sq mi)
- Time zone: UTC+01:00 (CET)
  - Summer (DST): UTC+02:00 (CEST)
- INSEE/Postal code: 74296 /74160
- ^{1} French Land Register data, which excludes lakes, ponds, glaciers > 1 km^{2} (0.386 sq mi or 247 acres) and river estuaries.

Vers (Savoyard: Vé) is a commune in the Haute-Savoie department in the Auvergne-Rhône-Alpes region in south-eastern France.

== See also ==
- Communes of the Haute-Savoie department
