= Clarafond-Arcine =

- Commune
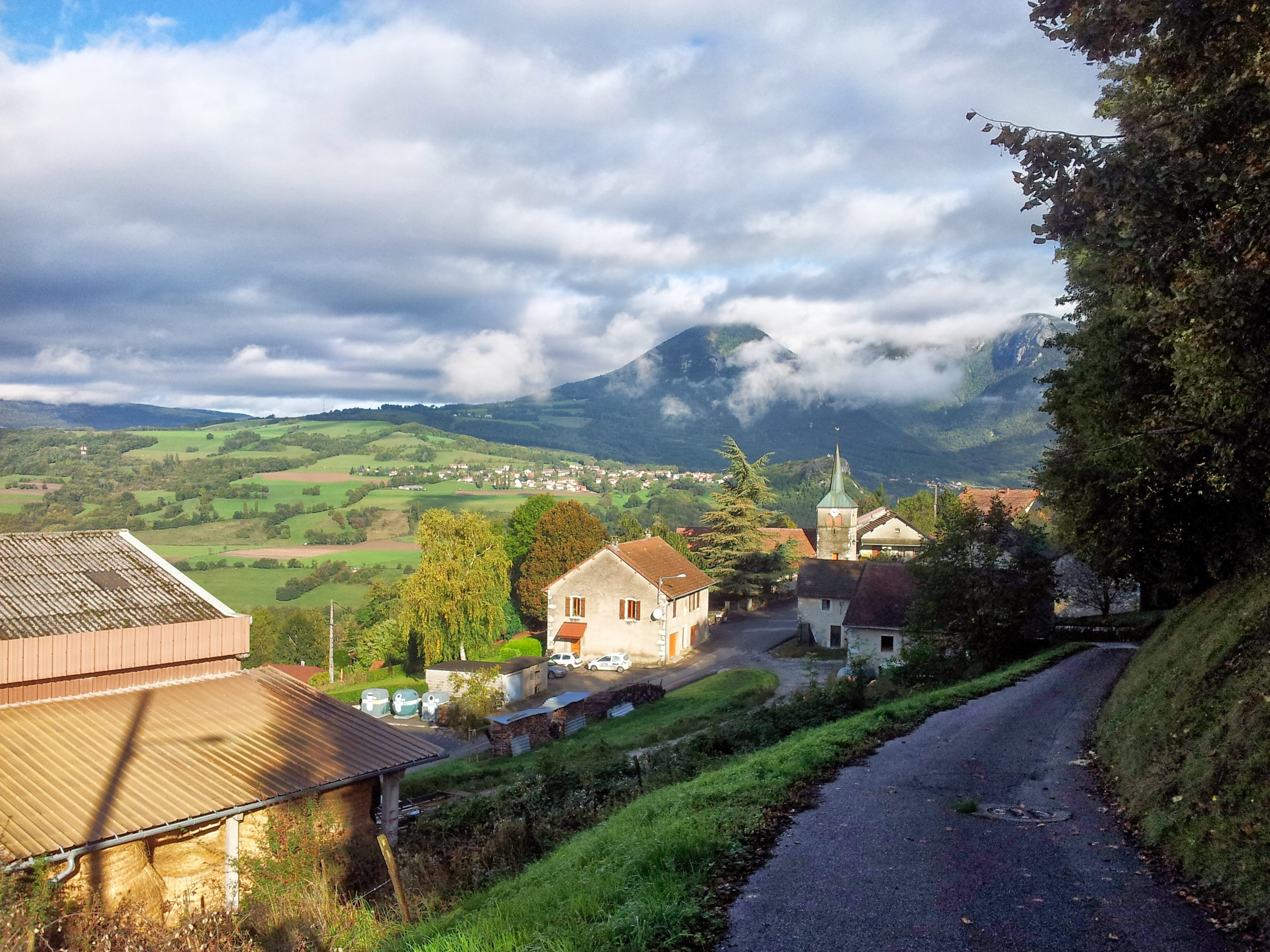
- Location of Clarafond-Arcine
- Location within France Location within Auvergne-Rhône-Alpes
- Coordinates: 46°03′54″N 5°53′40″E
- Country: France
- Region: Auvergne-Rhône-Alpes
- Department: Haute-Savoie
- Arrondissement: Saint-Julien-en-Genevois
- Canton: Saint-Julien-en-Genevois
- Intercommunality: CC Usses et Rhône

Government
  - Mayor (2020–2026): Sylvie Taragon
- Area^{1}: 16.88 km^{2} (6.52 sq mi)
- Highest elevation: 1,000 m (3,300 ft)
- Lowest elevation: 330 m (1,080 ft)
- Population (2023): 1,068
  - Density: 63.27/km^{2} (163.9/sq mi)
- Demonym: Clarcinois
- Time zone: UTC+01:00 (CET)
  - Summer (DST): UTC+02:00 (CEST)
- INSEE/Postal code: 74077 /74270
- ^{1} French Land Register data, which excludes lakes, ponds, glaciers > 1 km^{2} (0.386 sq mi or 247 acres) and river estuaries.

Clarafond-Arcine (French pronunciation: [klaʁafɔ̃ aʁsin]; Arpitan: Klyarafon) is a commune in the Haute-Savoie department in the Auvergne-Rhône-Alpes region in south-eastern France. It was created in 1974 by the merger of two former communes: Clarafond and Arcine. Prior to 1 July 2005, it was known as Clarafond.

== See also ==
- Communes of the Haute-Savoie department
