= Chilly, Haute-Savoie =

Chilly
- Commune
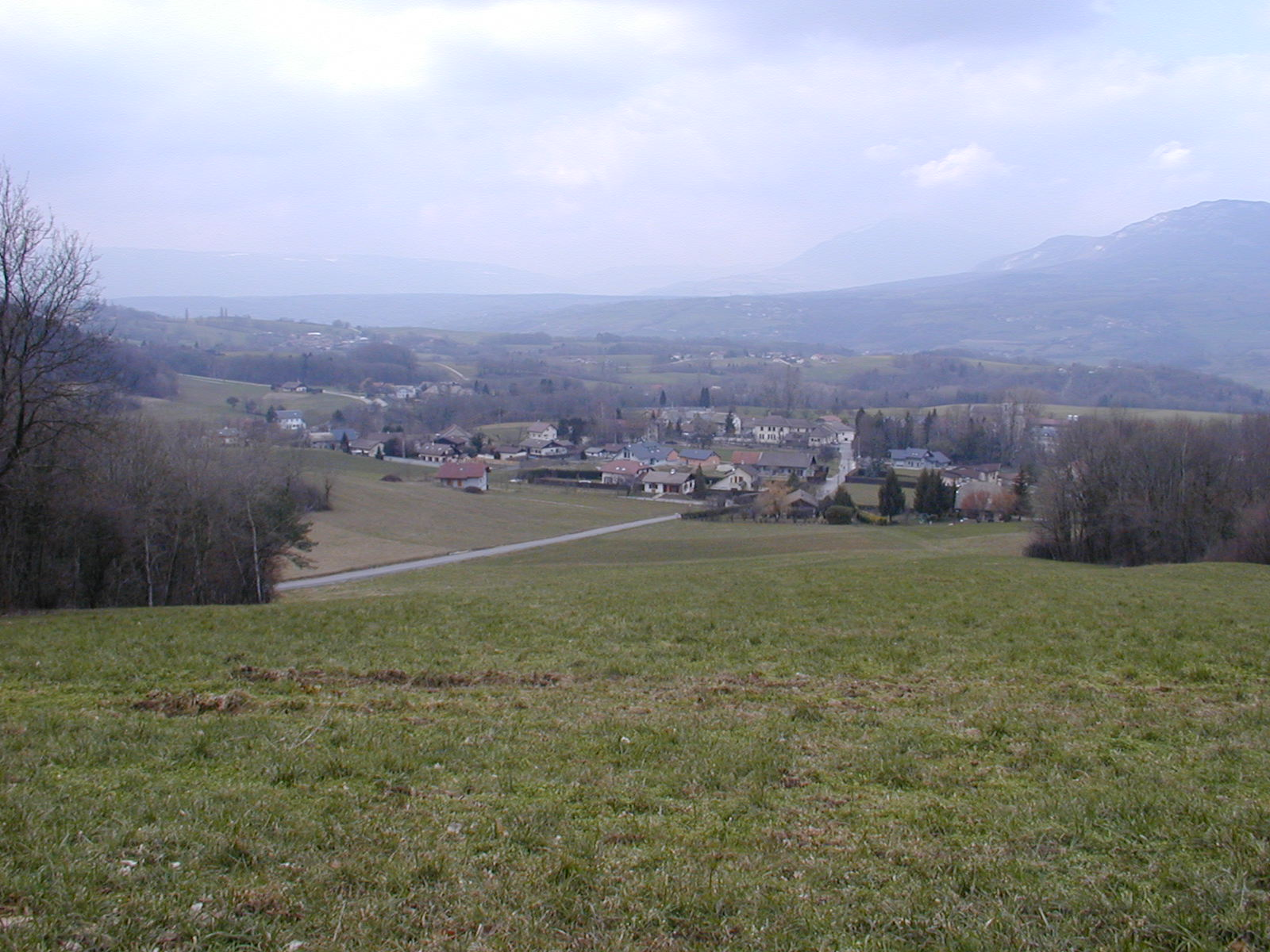
- A general view of Chilly
- Location of Chilly
- Location within France Location within Auvergne-Rhône-Alpes
- Coordinates: 45°59′33″N 5°57′13″E
- Country: France
- Region: Auvergne-Rhône-Alpes
- Department: Haute-Savoie
- Arrondissement: Saint-Julien-en-Genevois
- Canton: Saint-Julien-en-Genevois
- Intercommunality: CC Usses et Rhône

Government
  - Mayor (2020–2026): Emmanuel Georges
- Area^{1}: 18.58 km^{2} (7.17 sq mi)
- Highest elevation: 730 m (2,400 ft)
- Lowest elevation: 327 m (1,073 ft)
- Population (2023): 1,705
  - Density: 91.77/km^{2} (237.7/sq mi)
- Demonym: Chylliens
- Time zone: UTC+01:00 (CET)
  - Summer (DST): UTC+02:00 (CEST)
- INSEE/Postal code: 74075 /74270
- ^{1} French Land Register data, which excludes lakes, ponds, glaciers > 1 km^{2} (0.386 sq mi or 247 acres) and river estuaries.

Chilly (French pronunciation: [ʃiji]; Arpitan: Chelyi) is a commune in the Haute-Savoie department in the Auvergne-Rhône-Alpes region in south-eastern France.

The commune includes the hamlets of Botilly, Coucy, Curnillex, Darogne, Ferraz, Grange bouillet, Lacry, Les Vernays, Mannecy, Mougny, Novéry, planaise, Quincy et Vers grange.

== See also ==
- Communes of the Haute-Savoie department
