= Canton of Saint-Julien-en-Genevois =

Administrative division of Haute-Savoie, France

Coordinates: 46.14°N 6.08°E

A map of the canton of Saint-Julien-en-Genevois in Haute-Savoie since 2015

The canton of Saint-Julien-en-Genevois (French: Canton de Saint-Julien-en-Genevois) is a canton (an administrative division) in the western part of the Haute-Savoie department in Southeastern France.

Its seat is Saint-Julien-en-Genevois; the canton is located on the Swiss border southwest of Geneva. Its borders were modified at the canton reorganisation that came into effect in March 2015. Since then, it elects two members of the Departmental Council of Haute-Savoie.

== Composition ==
The canton of Saint-Julien-en-Genevois consists of the following communes:

1. Archamps
2. Bassy
3. Beaumont
4. Bossey
5. Challonges
6. Chaumont
7. Chavannaz
8. Chêne-en-Semine
9. Chênex
10. Chessenaz
11. Chevrier
12. Chilly
13. Clarafond-Arcine
14. Clermont
15. Collonges-sous-Salève
16. Contamine-Sarzin
17. Desingy
18. Dingy-en-Vuache
19. Droisy
20. Éloise
21. Feigères
22. Franclens
23. Frangy
24. Jonzier-Épagny
25. Marlioz
26. Menthonnex-sous-Clermont
27. Minzier
28. Musièges
29. Neydens
30. Présilly
31. Saint-Germain-sur-Rhône
32. Saint-Julien-en-Genevois
33. Savigny
34. Seyssel
35. Usinens
36. Valleiry
37. Vanzy
38. Vers
39. Viry
40. Vulbens
