= Minzier =

Minzier Minzî (Savoyard)
- Commune
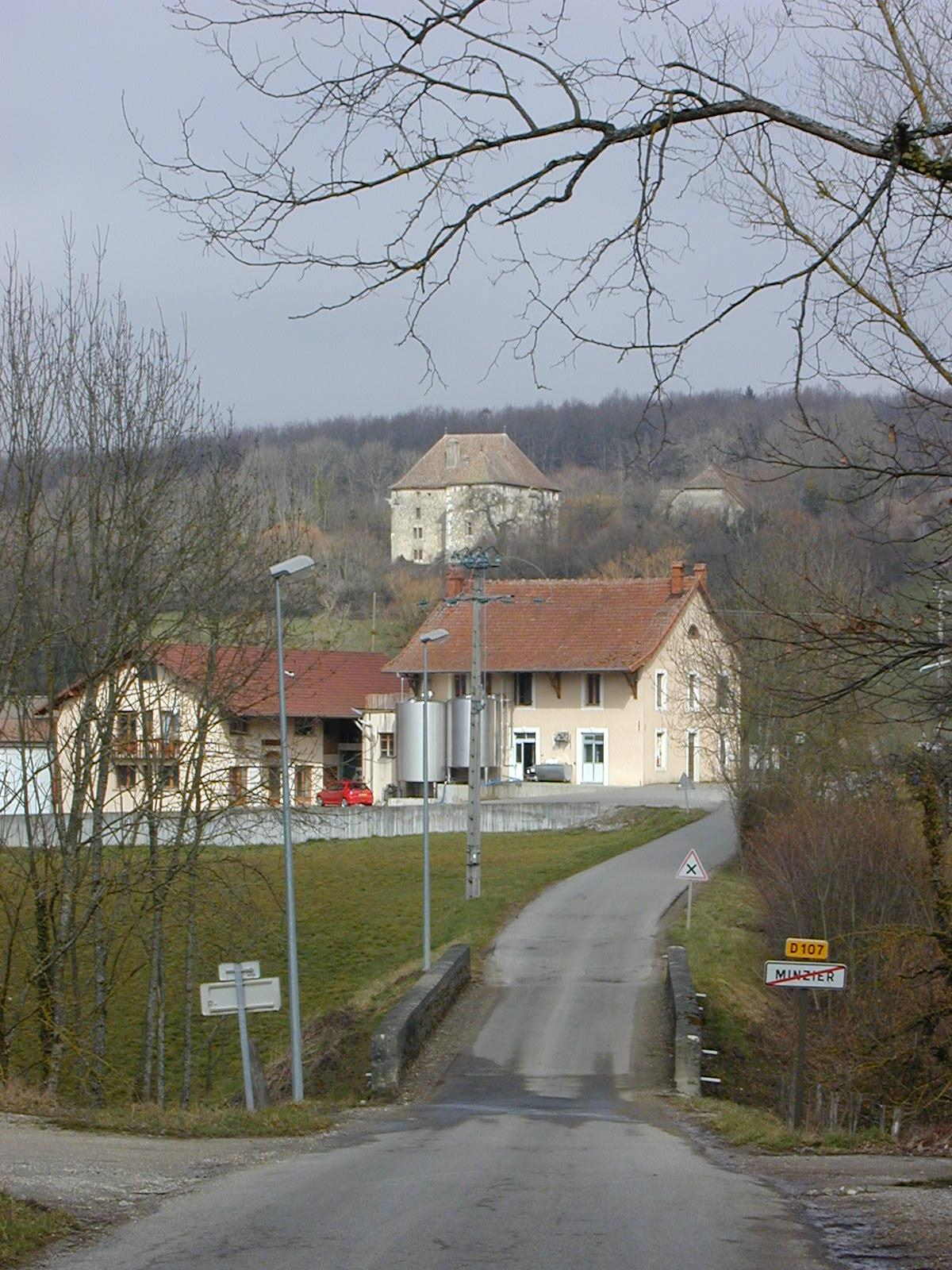
- A view at the edge of Minzier on the D107 road
- Location of Minzier
- Location within France Location within Auvergne-Rhône-Alpes
- Coordinates: 46°03′12″N 5°59′22″E
- Country: France
- Region: Auvergne-Rhône-Alpes
- Department: Haute-Savoie
- Arrondissement: Saint-Julien-en-Genevois
- Canton: Saint-Julien-en-Genevois
- Intercommunality: CC Usses et Rhône

Government
  - Mayor (2020–2026): Jérémie Courlet
- Area^{1}: 8.79 km^{2} (3.39 sq mi)
- Highest elevation: 750 m (2,460 ft)
- Lowest elevation: 456 m (1,496 ft)
- Population (2023): 1,090
  - Density: 124/km^{2} (321/sq mi)
- Demonym: Minziérois / Minziéroises
- Time zone: UTC+01:00 (CET)
  - Summer (DST): UTC+02:00 (CEST)
- INSEE/Postal code: 74184 /74270
- ^{1} French Land Register data, which excludes lakes, ponds, glaciers > 1 km^{2} (0.386 sq mi or 247 acres) and river estuaries.

Minzier (French pronunciation: [mɛ̃zje]; Savoyard: Minzî) is a commune in the Haute-Savoie department, in the Auvergne-Rhône-Alpes region, in south-eastern France.

== See also ==
- Communes of the Haute-Savoie department
