= Chevrier =

Chevrier Shèvrî (Savoyard)
- Commune
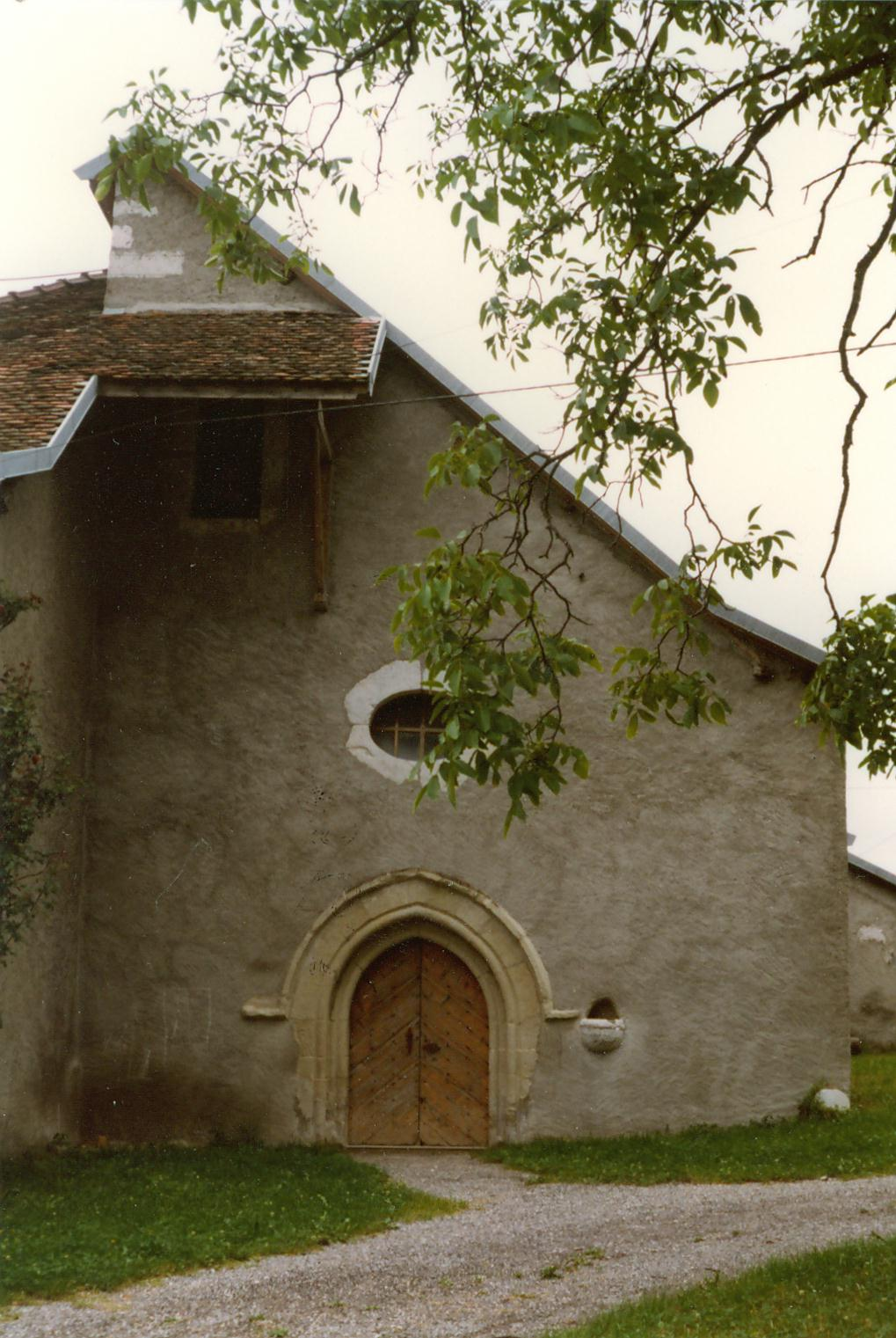
- The church in Chevrier
- Location of Chevrier
- Location within France Location within Auvergne-Rhône-Alpes
- Coordinates: 46°06′34″N 5°55′00″E
- Country: France
- Region: Auvergne-Rhône-Alpes
- Department: Haute-Savoie
- Arrondissement: Saint-Julien-en-Genevois
- Canton: Saint-Julien-en-Genevois
- Intercommunality: Genevois

Government
  - Mayor (2020–2026): Agnès Cuzin
- Area^{1}: 5.35 km^{2} (2.07 sq mi)
- Highest elevation: 932 m (3,058 ft)
- Lowest elevation: 332 m (1,089 ft)
- Population (2023): 757
  - Density: 141/km^{2} (366/sq mi)
- Time zone: UTC+01:00 (CET)
  - Summer (DST): UTC+02:00 (CEST)
- INSEE/Postal code: 74074 /74520
- ^{1} French Land Register data, which excludes lakes, ponds, glaciers > 1 km^{2} (0.386 sq mi or 247 acres) and river estuaries.

Chevrier (Savoyard: Shèvrî) is a commune in the Haute-Savoie department in the Auvergne-Rhône-Alpes region in south-eastern France.

== See also ==
- Communes of the Haute-Savoie department
