= Droisy, Haute-Savoie =

Droisy Drouêzi (Savoyard)
- Commune
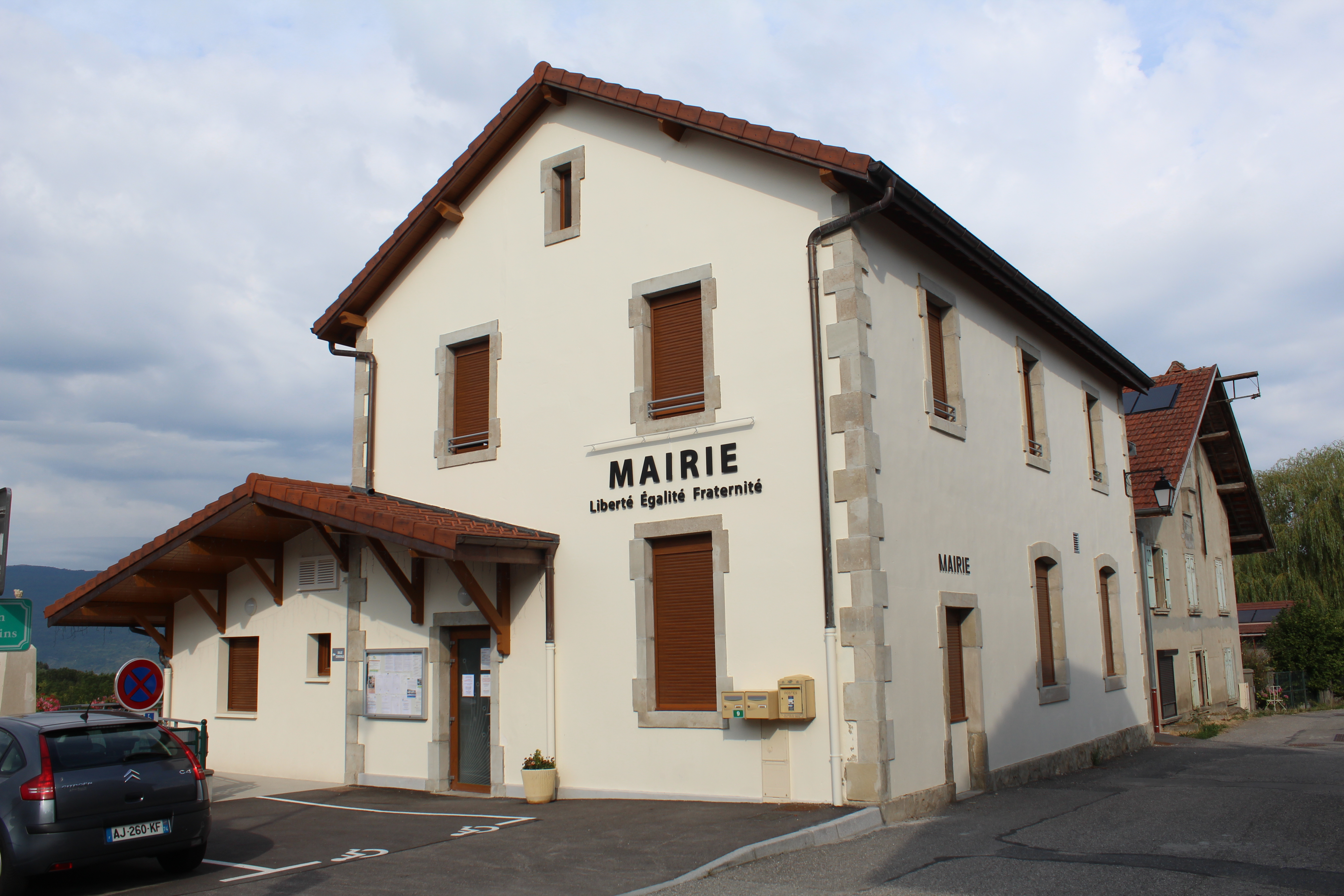
- Town hall
- Location of Droisy
- Location within France Location within Auvergne-Rhône-Alpes
- Coordinates: 45°57′57″N 5°53′01″E
- Country: France
- Region: Auvergne-Rhône-Alpes
- Department: Haute-Savoie
- Arrondissement: Saint-Julien-en-Genevois
- Canton: Saint-Julien-en-Genevois
- Intercommunality: Usses et Rhône

Government
  - Mayor (2020–2026): Jean-Paul Forestier
- Area^{1}: 4.55 km^{2} (1.76 sq mi)
- Highest elevation: 941 m (3,087 ft)
- Lowest elevation: 558 m (1,831 ft)
- Population (2023): 155
  - Density: 34.1/km^{2} (88.2/sq mi)
- Time zone: UTC+01:00 (CET)
  - Summer (DST): UTC+02:00 (CEST)
- INSEE/Postal code: 74107 /74270
- ^{1} French Land Register data, which excludes lakes, ponds, glaciers > 1 km^{2} (0.386 sq mi or 247 acres) and river estuaries.

Droisy (French pronunciation: [dʁwazi]; Savoyard: Drouêzi) is a commune in the Haute-Savoie department in the Auvergne-Rhône-Alpes region in south-eastern France.

== See also ==
- Communes of the Haute-Savoie department
