= Jonzier-Épagny =

Jonzier-Épagny Zhonvi-Épanyi (Savoyard)
- Commune
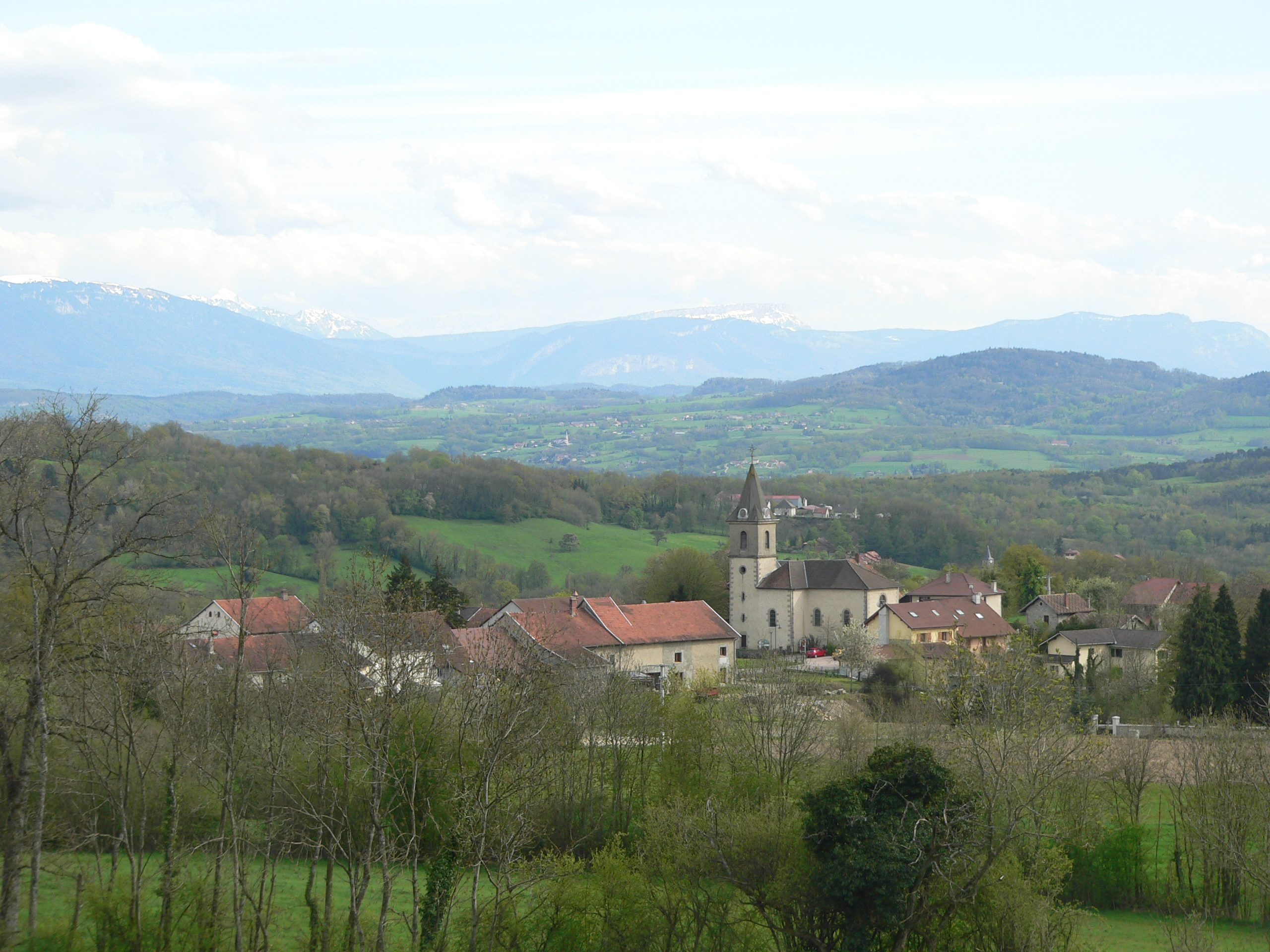
- A general view of Jonzier-Épagny

- Coat of arms
- Location of Jonzier-Épagny
- Location within France Location within Auvergne-Rhône-Alpes
- Coordinates: 46°04′17″N 5°59′26″E
- Country: France
- Region: Auvergne-Rhône-Alpes
- Department: Haute-Savoie
- Arrondissement: Saint-Julien-en-Genevois
- Canton: Saint-Julien-en-Genevois
- Intercommunality: CC du Genevois

Government
  - Mayor (2020–2026): Michel Mermin
- Area^{1}: 7.16 km^{2} (2.76 sq mi)
- Highest elevation: 733 m (2,405 ft)
- Lowest elevation: 518 m (1,699 ft)
- Population (2023): 942
  - Density: 132/km^{2} (341/sq mi)
- Time zone: UTC+01:00 (CET)
  - Summer (DST): UTC+02:00 (CEST)
- INSEE/Postal code: 74144 /74520
- ^{1} French Land Register data, which excludes lakes, ponds, glaciers > 1 km^{2} (0.386 sq mi or 247 acres) and river estuaries.

Jonzier-Épagny (French pronunciation: [ʒɔ̃zje epaɲi]; Savoyard: Zhonvi-Épanyi) is a commune in the Haute-Savoie department in the Auvergne-Rhône-Alpes region in south-eastern France.

The commune comprises three hamlets (Les Barraques, Épagny, Vigny) and a place named Mont-Sion.

== Geography ==
The commune covers 716 ha of glacial moraine from the Rhône, deposited about 10,000 years ago, and called the Montagne de Sion. The highest point in the commune is at 733 m.

== See also ==
- Communes of the Haute-Savoie department
