= Chaumont, Haute-Savoie =

Chaumont Shômon (Savoyard)
- Commune
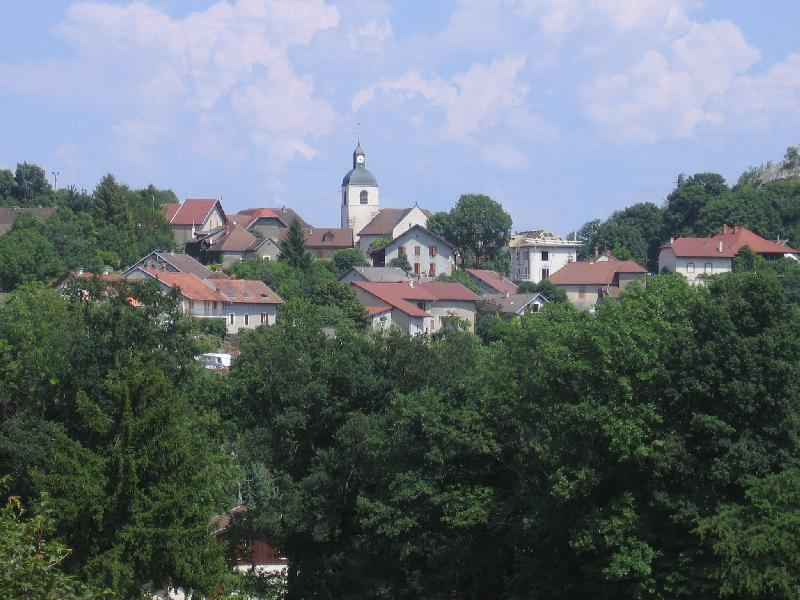
- A general view of the village of Chaumont

- Coat of arms
- Location of Chaumont
- Location within France Location within Auvergne-Rhône-Alpes
- Coordinates: 46°02′09″N 5°57′33″E
- Country: France
- Region: Auvergne-Rhône-Alpes
- Department: Haute-Savoie
- Arrondissement: Saint-Julien-en-Genevois
- Canton: Saint-Julien-en-Genevois
- Intercommunality: CC Usses et Rhône

Government
  - Mayor (2020–2026): André-Gilles Chatagnat
- Area^{1}: 12.38 km^{2} (4.78 sq mi)
- Highest elevation: 1,112 m (3,648 ft)
- Lowest elevation: 338 m (1,109 ft)
- Population (2023): 555
  - Density: 44.8/km^{2} (116/sq mi)
- Time zone: UTC+01:00 (CET)
  - Summer (DST): UTC+02:00 (CEST)
- INSEE/Postal code: 74065 /74270
- ^{1} French Land Register data, which excludes lakes, ponds, glaciers > 1 km^{2} (0.386 sq mi or 247 acres) and river estuaries.

Chaumont (French pronunciation: [ʃomɔ̃]; Savoyard: Shômon) is a commune in the Haute-Savoie department in the Auvergne-Rhône-Alpes region in south-eastern France.

== See also ==
- Communes of the Haute-Savoie department
