= Valleiry =

Valleiry Valéri (Savoyard)
- Commune
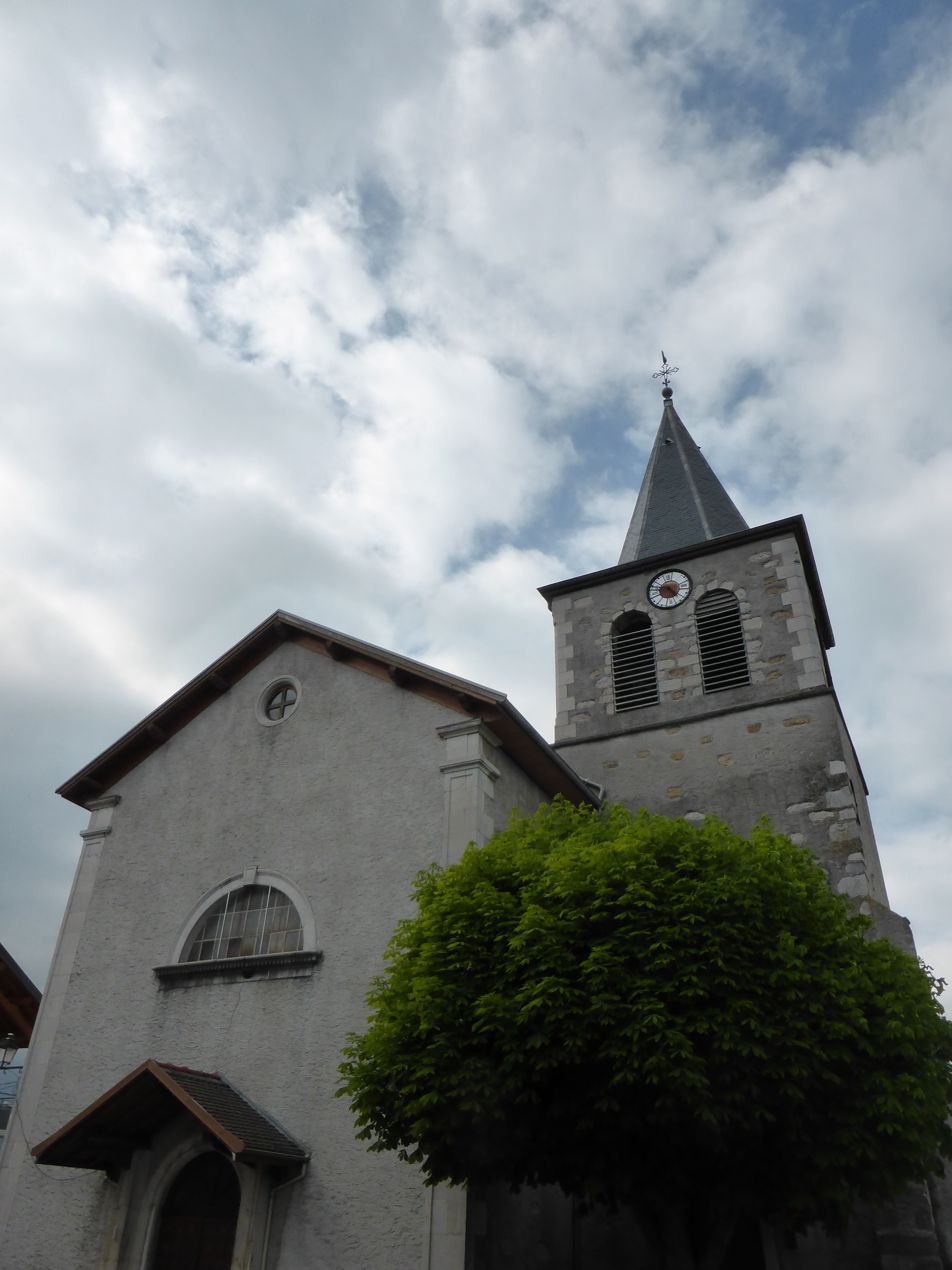
- The church in Valleiry

- Coat of arms
- Location of Valleiry
- Location within France Location within Auvergne-Rhône-Alpes
- Coordinates: 46°06′32″N 5°58′07″E
- Country: France
- Region: Auvergne-Rhône-Alpes
- Department: Haute-Savoie
- Arrondissement: Saint-Julien-en-Genevois
- Canton: Saint-Julien-en-Genevois
- Intercommunality: CC du Genevois

Government
  - Mayor (2020–2026): Alban Magnin
- Area^{1}: 6.95 km^{2} (2.68 sq mi)
- Highest elevation: 560 m (1,840 ft)
- Lowest elevation: 355 m (1,165 ft)
- Population (2023): 5,264
  - Density: 757/km^{2} (1,960/sq mi)
- Time zone: UTC+01:00 (CET)
  - Summer (DST): UTC+02:00 (CEST)
- INSEE/Postal code: 74288 /74520
- Website: www.valleiry.fr
- ^{1} French Land Register data, which excludes lakes, ponds, glaciers > 1 km^{2} (0.386 sq mi or 247 acres) and river estuaries.

Valleiry (French pronunciation: [valɛʁi]; Savoyard: Valéri) is a commune in the Haute-Savoie department in the Auvergne-Rhône-Alpes region in south-eastern France. It is located 23 kilometres (14 mi) by road from Geneva, Switzerland. It is home to some of the offices of the Fédération Internationale de l'Automobile (FIA), the association representing the interests of motoring organisations and motor car users.

== Population ==
Historical population
Year	Pop.	±% p.a.
1968	807	—
1975	1,249	+6.44%
1982	1,371	+1.34%
1990	1,748	+3.08%
1999	2,197	+2.57%
2007	2,962	+3.81%
2012	3,615	+4.06%
2017	4,697	+5.38%
2023	5,264	+1.92%
Source: INSEE

== See also ==
- Communes of the Haute-Savoie department
