= Dingy-en-Vuache =

Dingy-en-Vuache Dinzhi (Savoyard)
- Commune
- Coat of arms
- Location of Dingy-en-Vuache
- Location within France Location within Auvergne-Rhône-Alpes
- Coordinates: 46°05′34″N 5°56′43″E
- Country: France
- Region: Auvergne-Rhône-Alpes
- Department: Haute-Savoie
- Arrondissement: Saint-Julien-en-Genevois
- Canton: Saint-Julien-en-Genevois
- Intercommunality: Genevois

Government
  - Mayor (2020–2026): Éric Rosay
- Area^{1}: 7.18 km^{2} (2.77 sq mi)
- Highest elevation: 1,002 m (3,287 ft)
- Lowest elevation: 510 m (1,670 ft)
- Population (2023): 819
  - Density: 114/km^{2} (295/sq mi)
- Time zone: UTC+01:00 (CET)
  - Summer (DST): UTC+02:00 (CEST)
- INSEE/Postal code: 74101 /74520
- ^{1} French Land Register data, which excludes lakes, ponds, glaciers > 1 km^{2} (0.386 sq mi or 247 acres) and river estuaries.

Dingy-en-Vuache (French pronunciation: [dɛ̃ʒi ɑ̃ vɥaʃ]; Savoyard: Dinzhi) is a commune in the Haute-Savoie department in the Auvergne-Rhône-Alpes region in south-eastern France.

== See also ==
- Communes of the Haute-Savoie department
