= Menoge =

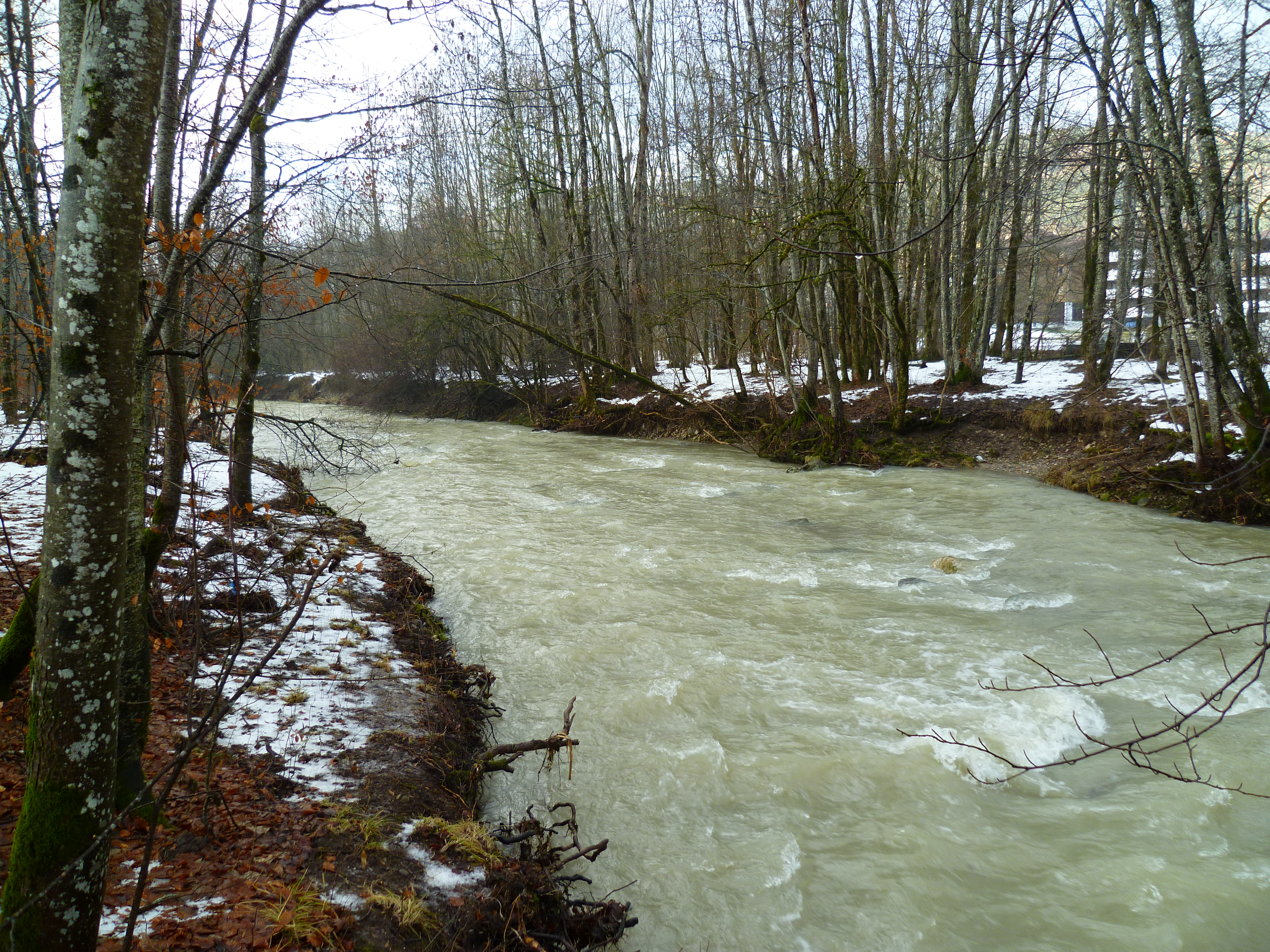

- Location within France Location within Auvergne-Rhône-Alpes

Location
- Country: France

Physical characteristics
- Mouth: Arve
  - coordinates: 46°10′11″N 6°14′45″E
- Length: 30 km (19 mi)

Basin features
- Progression: Arve→ Rhône→ Mediterranean Sea

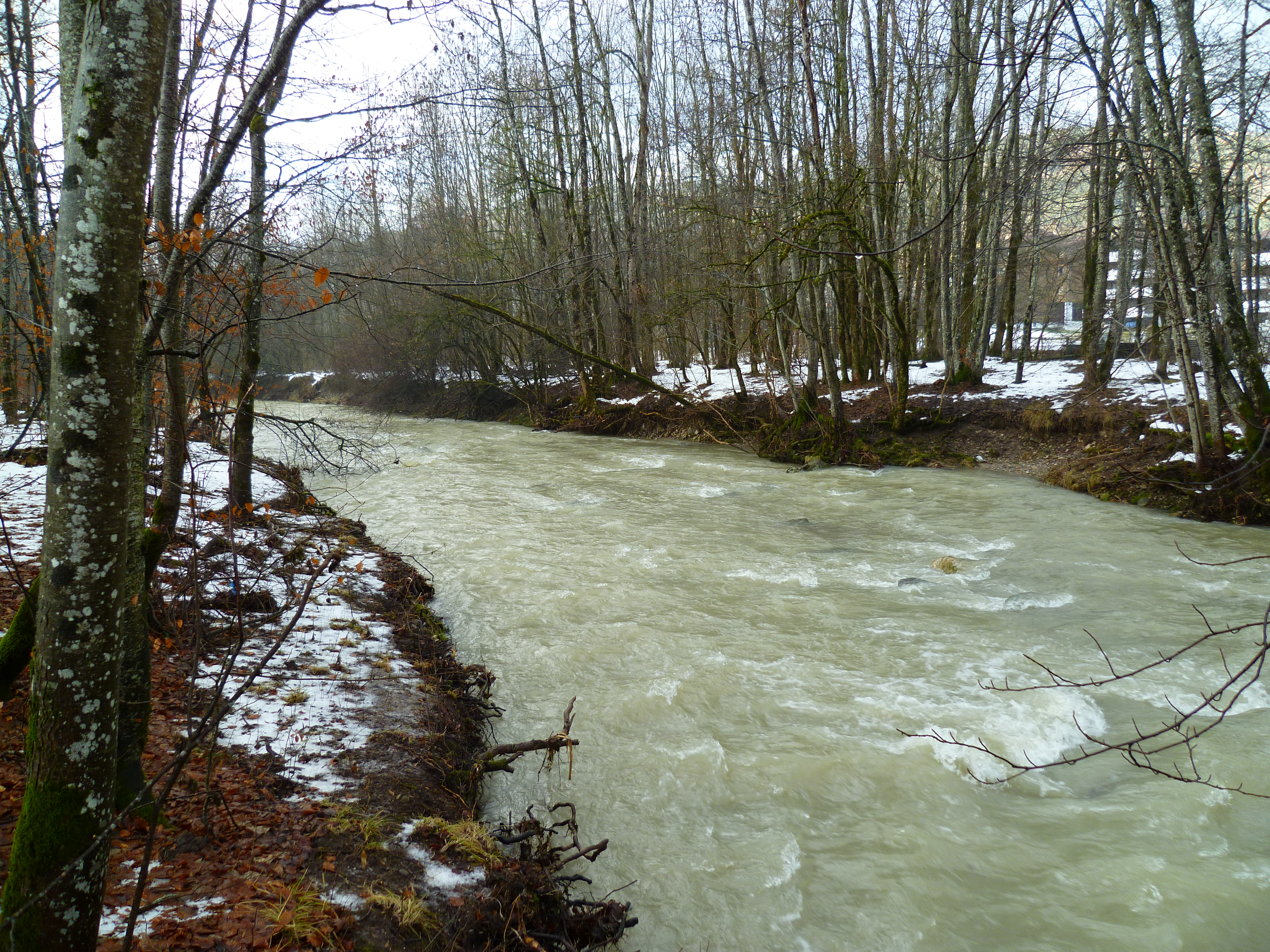
Menoge River

The Menoge is a French river found in the Haute-Savoie department. Its source is near the Col des Moise, and flows through Vallée Verte, into the Arve just before Annemasse. It is 30.2 km (18.8 mi) long.

Its tributaries are: Brevon de Saxel (confluence at Boëge) Le Foron de Fillinges (confluence at Bonne), Ruisseau du Nantet (confluence at Vétraz-Montoux).

Settlements along its length include: Habère-Poche, Habère-Lullin, Villard, Burdignin, Boëge, Saint-André-de-Boëge, Fillinges, Bonne, Arthaz-Pont-Notre-Dame, Cranves-Sales and Vetraz-Monthoux.
