= Maison Malfroy =

- Company type: Private
- Industry: Textiles; Fashion; Silk
- Founded: 1939; 87 years ago
- Founder: André Malfroy; Jean Million
- Headquarters: Lyon, France
- Area served: Worldwide
- Key people: Henri Malfroy (CEO)
- Products: Silk scarves, stoles, shawls, fabrics
- Owner: Malfroy family
- Website: malfroy.com

Maison Malfroy is a French silk scarf manufacturer based in Lyon, known as the French center for silk.

== History ==
Maison Malfroy was founded in 1939 by André Malfroy and Jean Million, who opened a workshop dedicated to creating silk scarves, printed using screen printing. Before founding Maison Malfroy, the Malfroy family had been working in the silk industry since the late 19th century. It initially used the “impression au cadre” frame screen-printing method to produce silk scarves.

Over the years, Maison Malfroy became known both domestically and internationally for silk-scarf production. The company remained family-owned, with each generation preserving the core practices while broadening technical expertise. In subsequent decades, Maison Malfroy expanded its product range to include wool and cotton alongside silk in its textiles.

In 1991, Maison Malfroy relocated its operations to Saint-Genis-Laval (a suburb of Lyon) to expand its operations.

In 1993, Maison Malfroy acquired Delacquis, a weaving atelier specializing in wool and jacquard textiles, adding jacquard weaving to its manufacturing.

In 2000, Maison Malfroy sold its fabric-printing plant, SIB, to the Hermès group. During the same time, Maison Malfroy established a design studio.

During the late 20th century, Maison Malfroy upgraded its manufacturing processes while maintaining traditional artisanal methods, such as hand-rolled finishing. In the 2000s, the third generation assumed leadership and introduced new printing techniques, broadening its color range and improving the precision of detailed silk designs.

Maison Malfroy regularly exhibits at international fairs such as Première Vision (Paris), Mode (Tokyo) and The London Textile Fair.

Over several decades, Maison Malfroy's studio produced silk scarves for luxury fashion houses such as Givenchy, Guy Laroche, Moschino and Sonia Rykiel, while also developing its in-house collections.

A third-generation family member currently heads the company.

== Production ==
Maison Malfroy produces silk scarves (foulards) and related accessories, including carré scarves, stoles and shawls. Items are designed in-house and primarily manufactured in France or Italy, typically featuring hand-rolled hems using the French "roulotté" technique. Its “Collection Musée” reproduces works by painters such as Gauguin, Monet, van Gogh, Cézanne, Klimt and Toulouse-Lautrec. Maison Malfroy designs original patterns for its collections each year, inspired by various cultural influences.
