= André Devigny =

French soldier and member of the Résistance (1916-1999)

Director of Action Division
- In office 1971–1976
- Preceded by: position established
- Succeeded by: Gaigneron de Marolles

Personal details
- Born: 25 May 1916 Habère-Lullin, Haute-Savoie, France
- Died: 12 February 1999 (aged 82) Hauteville-sur-Fier, Haute-Savoie, France
- Awards: Grand Officier de la Légion d'Honneur; Ordre de la Libération; Croix de Guerre (×8); Croix de la Valeur Militaire (×4); Médaille des Évadés; Commandeur du Mérite Sportif; Military Cross (UK); Croix de Guerre (Belgium); Ordre de la Couronne (Belgium)

Military service
- Allegiance: France
- Branch/service: French Army
- Years of service: 1939–1971
- Rank: Général de brigade
- Battles/wars: World War II; Algerian War

André Devigny (25 May 1916 – 12 February 1999) was a French soldier and member of the Résistance.

== Biography ==
Devigny was a schoolteacher who joined the French Army just before the outbreak of World War II in 1939. He was part of the fighting in 1940 as an infantry and light tank officer and wounded in June. Like many officers of the French military, he became part of the anti-Nazi resistance movement after the occupation of the country. He operated in the Lyon region under the code-name Valentin. He worked with the British Special Operations Executive (SOE) giving them information about the Germans by travelling to Spanish Morocco. In October 1942, he joined the resistance group known as the Gilbert Network. He became one of three commanders of the group, alongside Gilbert Groussard, its namesake, and Jean Cambus. The group helped refugees flee to Switzerland, sent information to the British via their consul in Geneva, and sabotaged German materiel.

== Arrest and prison escape ==
In April 1943, Robert Moog infiltrated the group and turned several of its members over to the German authorities. Among them was Edmée Delétraz, who was then observed by the Gestapo. She was later suspected of having betrayed Jean Moulin, one of the best-known members of the French Resistance, but Devigny always defended her vehemently against this charge. After Devigny met her, he was arrested and sent to the formidable Montluc prison, which was considered escape-proof. There he was tortured by Klaus Barbie and his men, but he gave them no valuable information. He did, however, make an unsuccessful series of attempts to escape, and was punished after each one. He was sentenced to death on 20 August 1943, the execution to be carried out on 28 August. However, Devigny had discovered a way to remove his handcuffs with a safety pin. He ground the end of a spoon to a point on his cell's concrete floor and used it to remove the wooden slats near the bottom of the cell door and squeeze through the opening. At night, he was able to leave the cell and speak with other prisoners. On the night of 24–25 August, when conditions for escape were optimal, Devigny and another prisoner who had recently been placed in his cell climbed out a skylight, using a rope made from a blanket and a mattress cover and a grappling hook fashioned from the frame of an old lantern, made their way across a roof and descended to the courtyard. Devigny threw a sentry to the ground and stabbed him with his own bayonet. The two inmates climbed an inner perimeter wall and, after a guard patrolling the perimeter corridor on bicycle had passed by, flung the end of the rope with the grappling hook across a 15-ft gap to the outer wall. They swung across the gap on the rope and leapt to the ground, gaining the freedom of the streets. Devigny eluded German search parties and fled to Switzerland with the help of comrades in the Resistance.

The Germans took revenge on Devigny by arresting two of his cousins and sending them to death camps. Leaving Switzerland, he went to Spain, where he was arrested again and escaped again. After re-joining the French Army, he participated in the Liberation of Alsace. After the war, President Charles de Gaulle honoured him with the prestigious Cross of the Liberation. Later he was appointed a senior official in France's foreign-intelligence organisation. While serving in Algeria, Devigny wrote a memoir of his escape from Montluc prison, published in 1956 as Un condamné à mort s'est échappé ("A Man Condemned to Death has Escaped"). Robert Bresson, who had himself been held by the Germans as a prisoner of war, used the memoir as the basis for a film of the same name (the English-language version was released as A Man Escaped); it won a prize at the Cannes Film Festival. In 1964, Devigny was recalled to France to assist with the secret re-organization of the French military. He retired in 1971 after President Georges Pompidou appointed Alexandre de Marenches as head of the intelligence services. He considered entering politics, but decided not to "when I realized the backstabbing was far worse than anything I'd ever encountered in secret warfare". Devigny died in 1999.
