= Saint-Genis-Laval massacre =

1944 German police massacre in France

Coordinates: 45.6986°N 4.7838°E

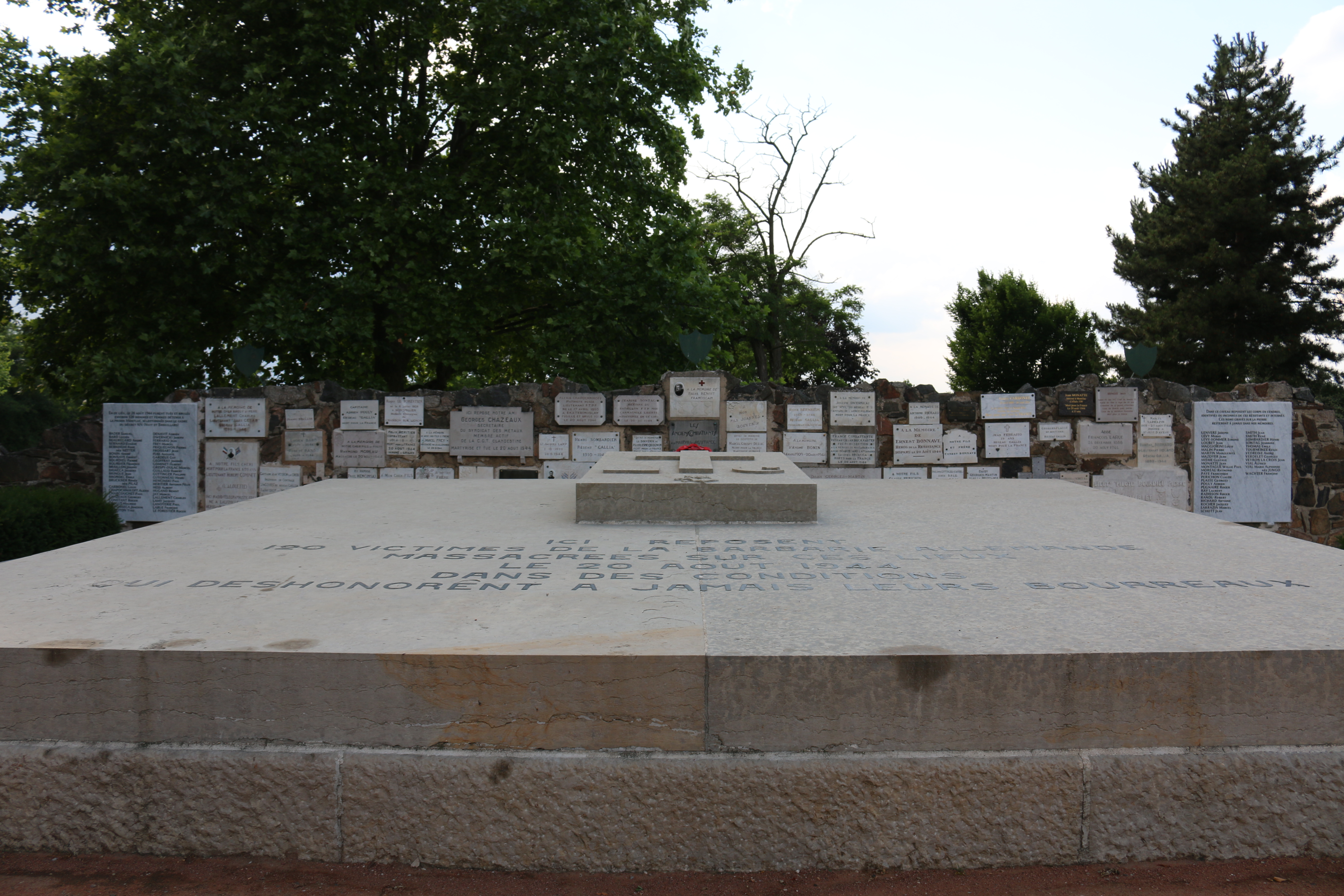

The Saint-Genis-Laval Massacre or Fort de Côte-Lorette Massacre was the execution of about 120 French citizens, mostly members of the Resistance, by German security police at Fort de Côte-Lorette, Saint-Genis-Laval, on 20 August 1944.

== Context ==
After the Normandy landings on 6 June 1944 and the Allied invasion of Provence on 15 August, the defeat of the Third Reich was imminent and the violence of the Nazi occupying forces intensified. According to Henri Amouroux, Montluc prison was a favoured place for the German forces to bring prisoners for execution. In the months preceding the liberation of Lyon, hundreds of prisoners were arbitrarily executed, including about a hundred Jews at Bron airfield.

== Events ==
On the morning of 20 August 1944 the Lyon Sicherheitspolizei, under the direction of Werner Knab and Klaus Barbie, took about 120 prisoners (mostly members of the Resistance) from Montluc prison. They were brought in two buses, accompanied by six cars containing Germans and members of the Milice française. They went to Fort de Côte-Lorette, where they arrived at 8:30 AM. The prisoners were shot in small groups inside the house. According to French Nazi collaborator Max Payot, toward the end of the massacre the piles of bodies were 6 feet in height; the perpetrators stood on these piles to silence the victims' groaning. René Wehrlen, one of the prisoners and a malgre-nous, was able to escape and was not recaptured.

After the shooting, the executioners burned the house down using gasoline and phosphorus, and blew up what remained. Many of the victims were local members of the French Resistance, including Daisy Georges-Martin, François Boursier, and Roger Radisson.

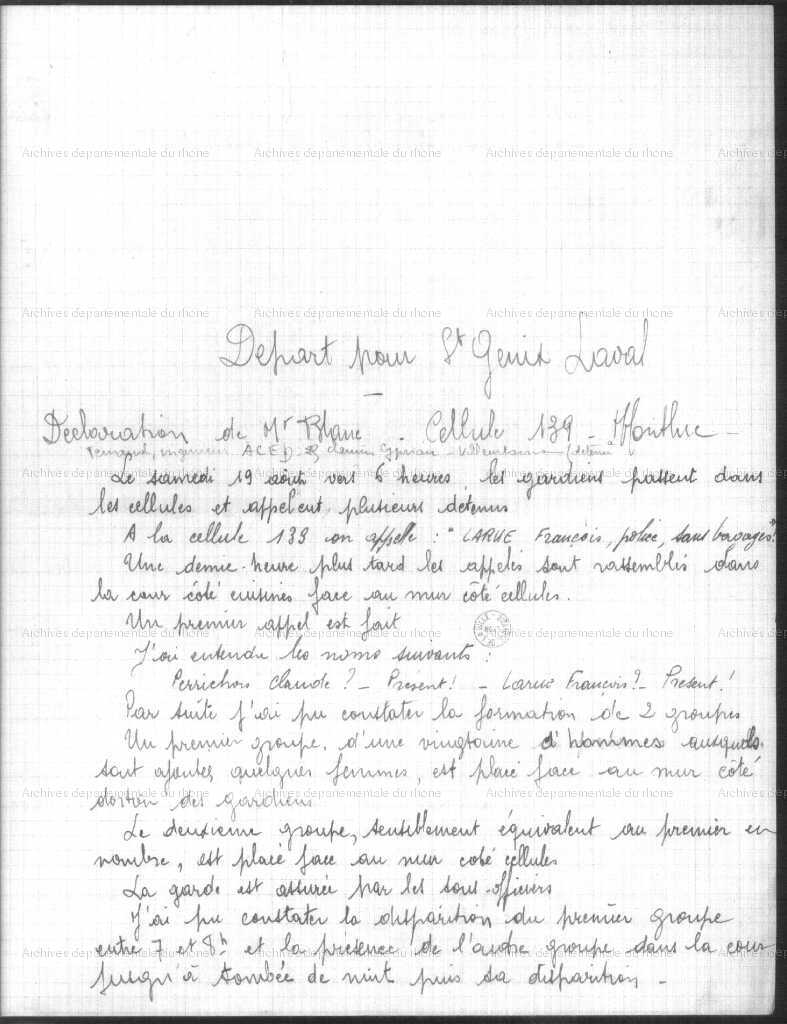
Statement of a prisoner in Montluc prison before the massacre (page 1)

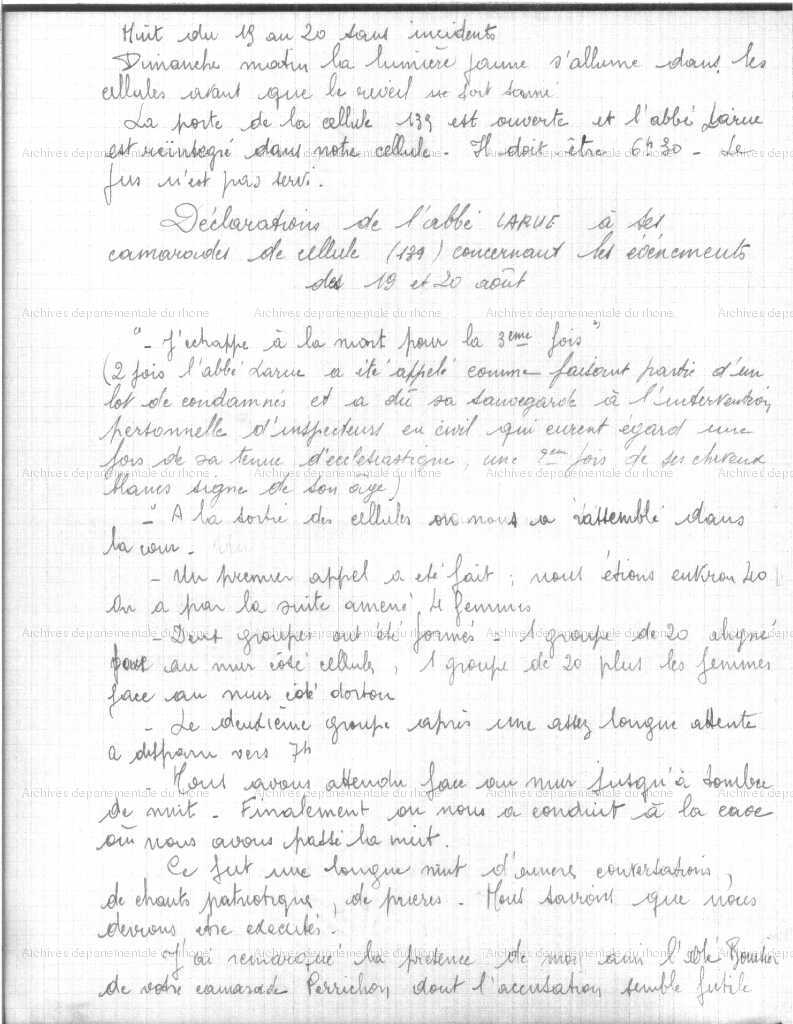
Statement of a prisoner in Montluc prison before the massacre (page 2)

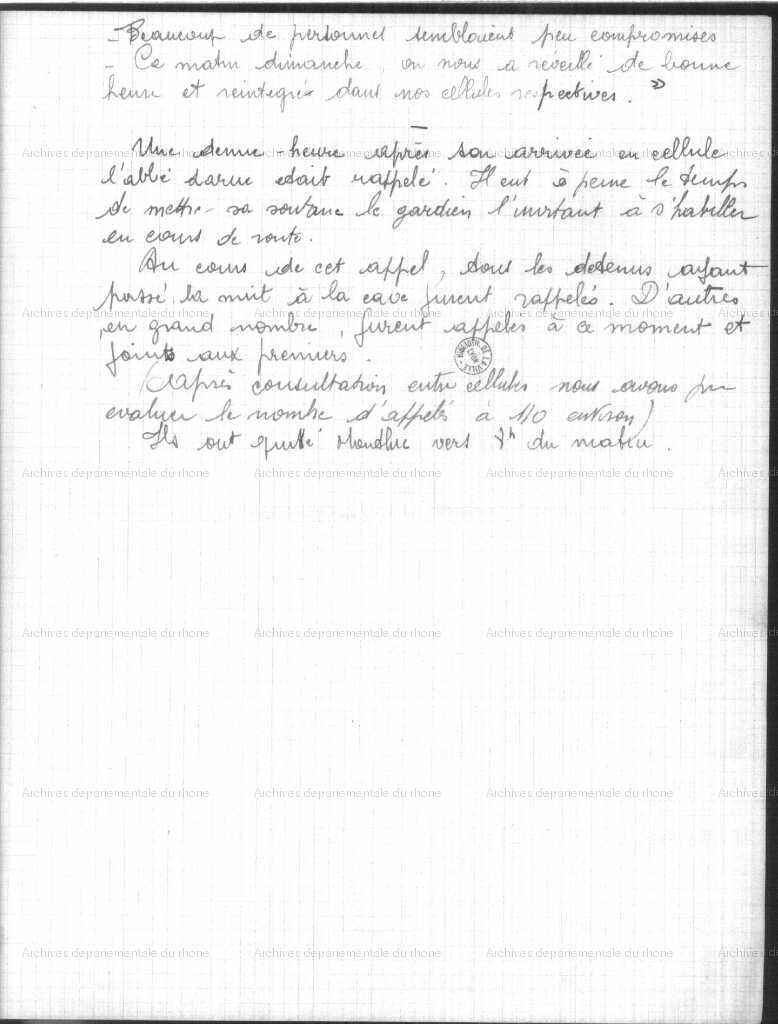
Statement of a prisoner in Montluc prison before the massacre (page 3)

== Aftermath ==
In retaliation, and with the goal of saving the thousand or so prisoners at Montluc prison, Yves Farge, Commissioner of the Republic, ordered the execution of 84 German prisoners being held by the French Forces of the Interior in Haute-Savoie. A letter was sent to Werner Knab to make it known that any further execution of French prisoners would be met with the execution of more German prisoners, including a chief of police who was captured by the French Forces of the Interior in Loire.

On the evening of 23 August the prefect André Boutemy handed the keys to Montluc prison to Yves Farge. The prison was liberated eleven hours before the liberation of Lyon, which happened on 3 September 1944. 44 German prisoners were executed at Annecy on 28 August, and 40 more at a house in Habère-Lullin on 2 September; the latter execution happened in the place where the Nazis had killed 25 youths on Christmas Eve in the Habère-Lullin Massacre.

On 21 August a team of morticians from the French Red Cross arrived to remove and identify the bodies from the massacre. They laid 88 coffins to rest, but the exact number of victims is not known; some of the coffins contained only bone fragments and debris. As of 2014, the work of identifying the bodies is still ongoing; a little more than 80 bodies have been identified.

On 22 August Cardinal Gerlier expressed his indignation to Knab in a letter where he called it an "indignity to Christian society and to simple humanity to put people to death in this manner", and said that "whoever bore the responsibility would be forever dishonoured in the eyes of humanity". The funeral was held at Saint-Genis-Laval on 23 August in the presence of Cardinal Gerlier, even though the Germans still occupied the town.

Each year, the Commune of Saint-Genis-Laval commemorates the massacre at the end of August in an official ceremony.

== Notes ==
1.Original French: "indigne d’une civilisation chrétienne ou simplement humaine, de mettre à mort de cette manière"
2.Original French: "ceux qui en portent la responsabilité sont à jamais déshonorés aux yeux de l’humanité"
