= Joséphine Fodor =

French opera singer (1789/93–1870)

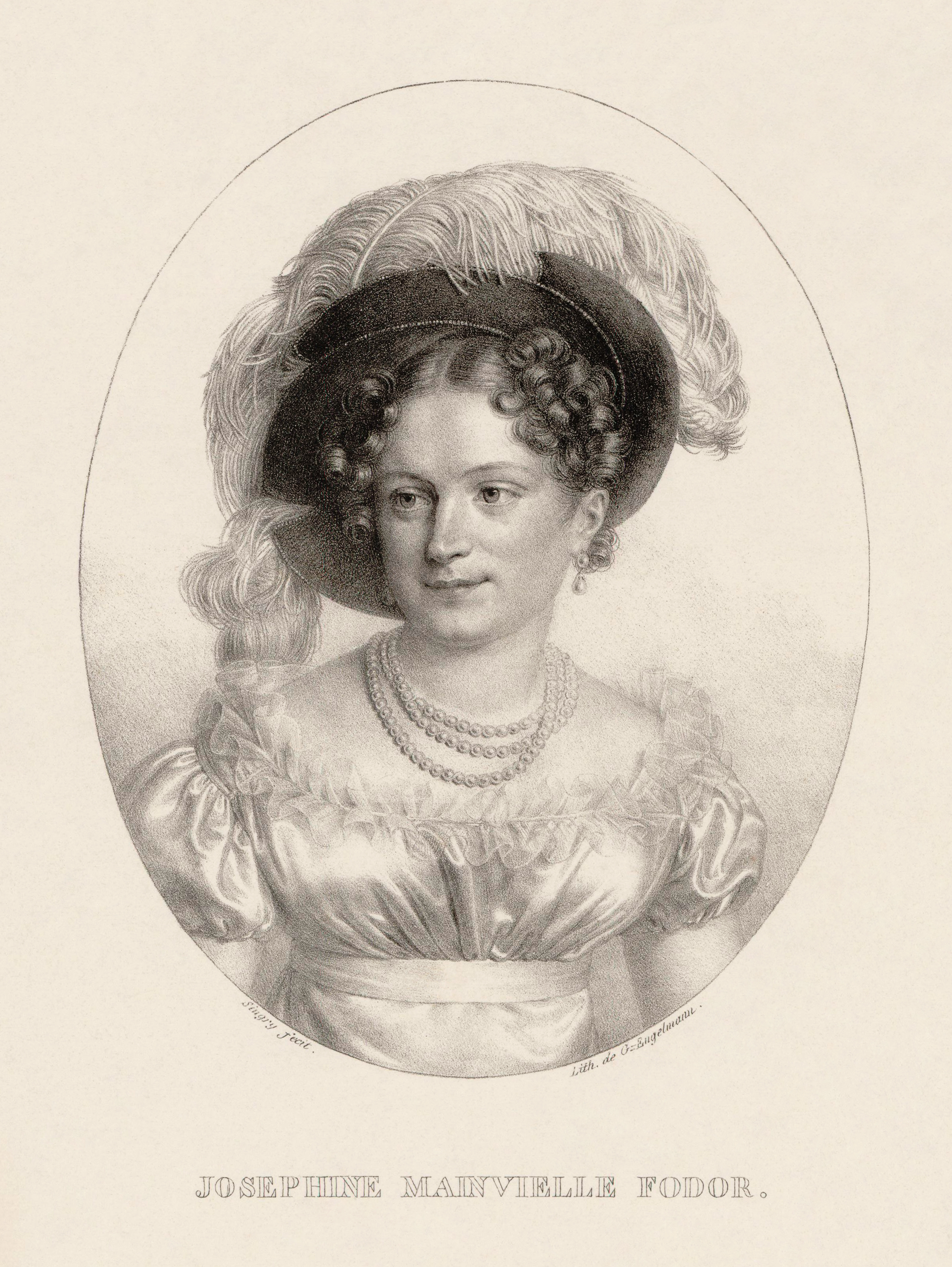
Joséphine Fodor c. 1815

Geneviève Joséphine Fodor (13 October 1789 or 1793 – 10 August 1870), also known as Joséphine Fodor-Mainvielle, was a French opera soprano.

== Biography ==
Geneviève Joséphine Fodor, the daughter of composer and violinist Josephus Andreas Fodor (1751–1828) and Louise Edme Marmet, was born in Paris in 1789 or 1793. Her parents left France for Russia when she was only a few months old, emigrating probably because of the French Revolution. She grew up in Saint Petersburg where her father, a teacher of the imperial children, taught her the harp and piano.

In 1810, she made her debut in Fioravanti's (1770–1837) opera Le cantatrici villane at the Impérial Opera of Saint Petersburg, singing in both Russian and French.

In 1812, she married Jean-Baptiste Tharaud-Mainvielle, an actor at the French theatre of Saint Petersburg. Shortly afterwards, the couple left St. Petersburg, which was under attack during the French invasion of Russia and went to France via Finland.

After a few performances at the Opéra comique in Paris, she was engaged by the Comédie-Italienne and made her debut on 16 November 1814 in Griselda (by Ferdinando Paer). She performed in London and Venice afterwards, before her return to the Comédie-Italienne in 1819 to sing in Il matrimonio segreto, Don Giovanni, Le Barbier de Séville and La gazza ladra.

She went to Italy for her health, and toured to Naples where she triumphed in Otello and Vienna before returning to Paris in 1825 for further performances at the Comédie Italienne. Shortly afterwards, she suffered from vocal difficulties, gradually ended her operatic career and withdrew from the stage. She stayed for a while in Passy. where she worked for charities, then in Limoges. A widow, she moved to Lyon where her son Martial Tharaud-Mainvielle lived.

In 1857, she published Réflexions et conseils sur l'art du chant.

She died in Saint-Genis-Laval on 10 August 1870, in the country house of her daughter-in-law.

Her daughter Henriette, who was also a singer, was engaged by the Königsstädtisches Theater in Berlin between 1846 and 1849.

== Bibliography ==
- Annuaire administratif, biographique, statistique, industriel et commercial de la ville de Passy, 1858, Read online
- Camille Dreyfus, La Grande encyclopédie, inventaire raisonné des sciences, des lettres et des arts, volume 22, Read online.
- François Joseph Fétis, Biographie universelle des musiciens, et bibliographie générale de la musique, 1883, Read online
- Charles Unger, Joséphine Mainvielle-Fodor, Précis historique, Vienna, 1823
