= Montluc prison =

Monument historique prison building in Lyon, France

Montluc
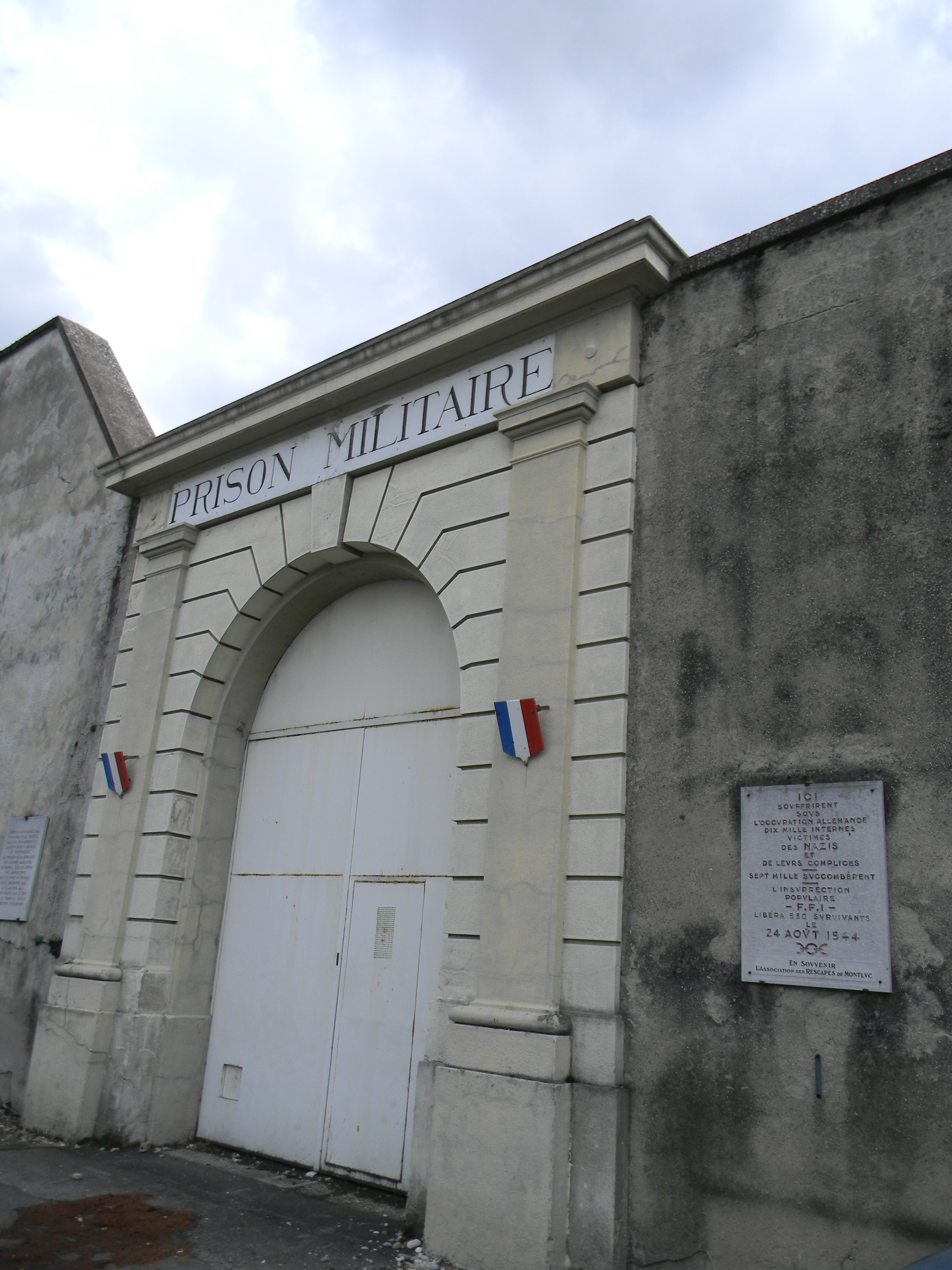
- Entrance to the prison
- Interactive map of Montluc
- Location: Lyon, France; 45°45′1.37″N 4°51′42.61″E
- Status: Museum
- Opened: 1921
- Closed: 1997

Montluc prison (French pronunciation: [mɔ̃lyk]) is a former prison located on rue Jeanne Hachette in the 3rd arrondissement of Lyon, France. It was known for being an internment, torture and killing place by the Gestapo during the occupation of France by Nazi Germany.

== History ==
Built in 1921 for use as a military prison, after the invasion of the unoccupied zone of Vichy France in November 1942, the Gestapo used it as a prison, interrogation centre and internment camp for those waiting for transfer to concentration camps. It is estimated that over 15,000 people were imprisoned in Montluc, and over 900 of them were executed within it.

In mid-August 1944, prisoners from Montluc were taken to Bron Airfield where 109 of them, including 72 Jews, were killed in what would become known as Le Charnier de Bron ("The Charnel house of Bron").

On 20 August about 120 prisoners were taken to Fort de Côte-Lorette in Saint-Genis-Laval and shot. This event is known as the Saint-Genis-Laval massacre.

Montluc was liberated on 24 August 1944 by FFI troops, when resistance leader Colonel Köenig, profiting from the chaos reigning in Lyon at the time, entered the prison in a stolen German Army car disguised as a Gestapo officer and persuaded the Commandant to free the prisoners, saying that the order had come from the Gestapo Commander in Lyon, Klaus Barbie.

In 1947, Montluc became a civil prison once again, finally closing in 1997, though the female maison d'arrêt was not closed until May 2009.

== Current status ==
In 2009, most of the prison, including the walls, the stairs and the courtyard, were classified as a monument historique. Since September 2010 the prison has been open to the public for guided tours organized by the National Office of Veterans and War Victims (l’Office national des Anciens combattants et Victimes de guerre).

== Notable prisoners ==
- Raymond Aubrac, resistance leader (1943)
- Antoine Avinin, French businessman, army officer and resistance leader, later a deputy and senator (1942)
- Francis Basin, French SOE organiser of URCHIN network (1942)
- Anthony Brooks, British SOE officer (1944)
- Marc Bloch, historian and resister (1944)
- Habib Bourguiba, Tunisian nationalist, later 1st President of Tunisia (1943)
- André Devigny, soldier and resister who escaped (1943)
- Salomon Gluck, physician and resister (1944)
- Maurice Joyeux, anarchist (1940–44)
- Jean de Lattre de Tassigny, later commander of 1st French Army during the invasion of Southern France (1942–43)
- Jean Moulin, soldier and resistance leader (1943)
- Roland de Pury, Calvinist minister and resistance leader (1943)
- Élise Rivet, nun and resister (1944)
- Andre Frossard, French journalist and essayist, interned in the "Jew Booths" of Fort Montluc; one of seven survivors of Bron Massacre (1943–44)
- Alice Vansteenberghe, physician and resister (1944)

== See also ==
- A Man Escaped
- Hôtel Terminus
- Fort Montluc
