= Agglomeration community of Annemasse – Les Voirons =

Coordinates: 46.19°N 6.24°E

Annemasse – Les Voirons
- Communauté d'agglomération
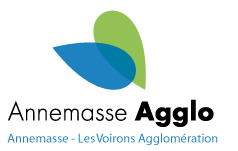
- Country: France
- Region: Auvergne-Rhône-Alpes
- Department: Haute-Savoie
- No. of communes: {{{nbcomm}}}
- Established: 1 January 2002

Government
  - President (2020–2026): Gabriel Doublet (UDI)
- Area: 78.2 km^{2} (30.2 sq mi)
- Population (2018): 90,378
  - Density: 1,160/km^{2} (2,990/sq mi)
- Website: www.annemasse-agglo.fr

The agglomeration community Annemasse – Les Voirons is an intercommunal structure located in Haute-Savoie, France. It consists of the town Annemasse and 11 neighbouring communes. It is located at the Swiss border, east of Geneva, between the mountains Salève and Voirons. Its area is 78.2 km^{2}. Its population was 90,378 in 2018, of which 36,250 in Annemasse proper.

== History ==
In 1966, the communes of Ambilly, Annemasse, Etrembières, Gaillard, Ville-la-Grand and Vétraz-Monthoux formed the syndicat intercommunal à vocations multiples of the Annemasse agglomeration. This cooperation became a communauté de communes on January 1, 2002. The communauté de communes of the Annemasse agglomeration and the communauté de communes of the Voirons merged to form the present agglomeration community in 2008.

=== Communes ===
The communauté d'agglomération consists of the following 12 communes:

- Annemasse
- Ambilly
- Bonne
- Cranves-Sales
- Étrembières
- Gaillard
- Juvigny
- Lucinges
- Machilly
- Saint-Cergues
- Vétraz-Monthoux
- Ville-la-Grand

== Politics ==
=== Community council ===
The council is composed of 79 delegates of municipal councils of member communes.

Commune	Number of delegates
Ambilly	6
Annemasse	19
Bonne	4
Cranves-Sales	4
Etrembières	6
Gaillard	4
Juvigny	9
Lucinges	4
Machilly	4
Saint-Cergues	4
Vétraz-Monthoux	4
Ville-La-Grand	7
