= Juvigny, Haute-Savoie =

Juvigny Zheuvnyi (Savoyard)
- Commune
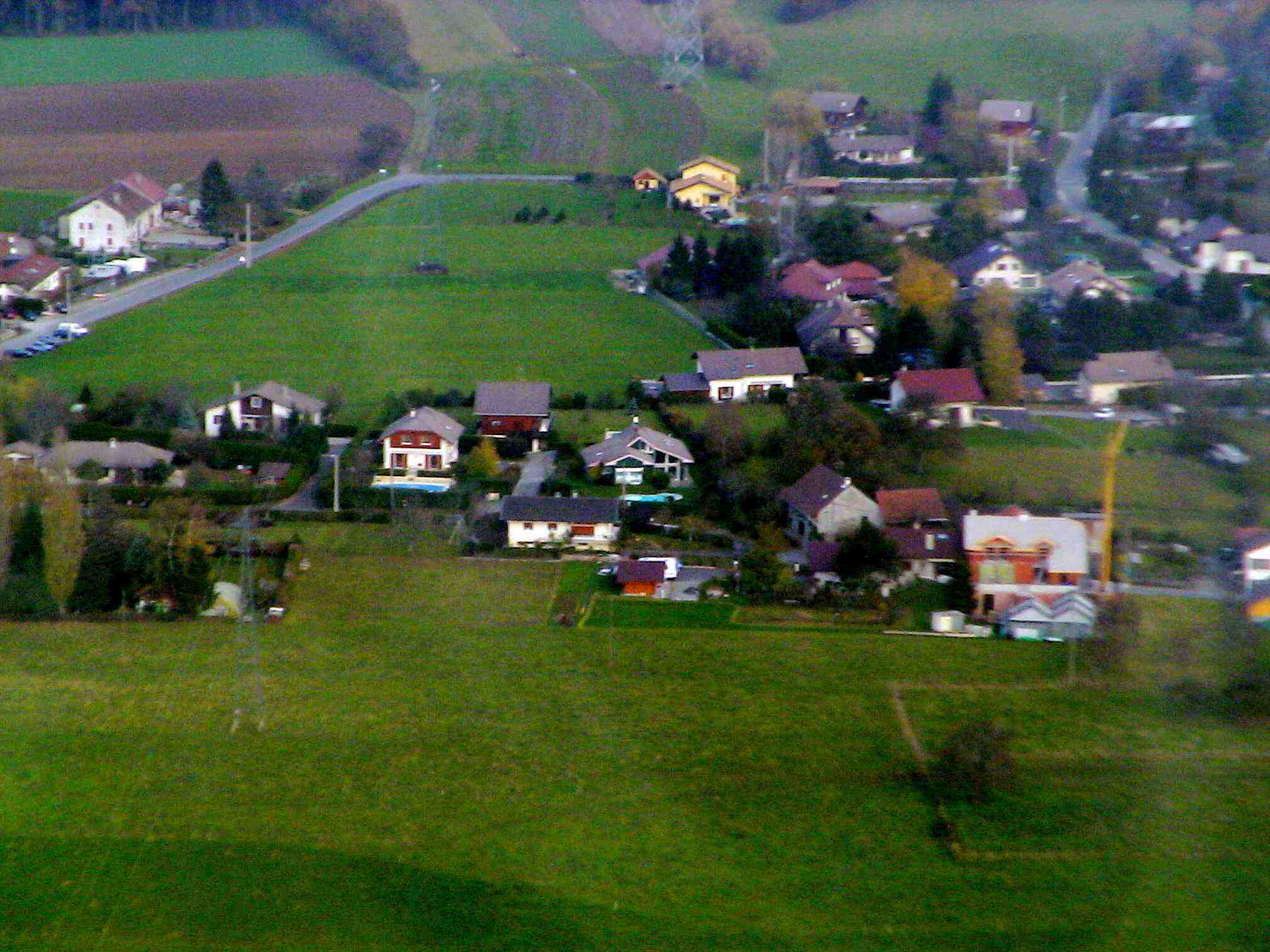
- An aerial view of Juvigny
- Location of Juvigny
- Location within France Location within Auvergne-Rhône-Alpes
- Coordinates: 46°12′51″N 6°16′52″E
- Country: France
- Region: Auvergne-Rhône-Alpes
- Department: Haute-Savoie
- Arrondissement: Saint-Julien-en-Genevois
- Canton: Gaillard
- Intercommunality: Annemasse - Les Voirons Agglomération

Government
  - Mayor (2020–2026): Denis Maire
- Area^{1}: 2.71 km^{2} (1.05 sq mi)
- Highest elevation: 520 m (1,710 ft)
- Lowest elevation: 430 m (1,410 ft)
- Population (2023): 639
  - Density: 236/km^{2} (611/sq mi)
- Time zone: UTC+01:00 (CET)
  - Summer (DST): UTC+02:00 (CEST)
- INSEE/Postal code: 74145 /74100
- ^{1} French Land Register data, which excludes lakes, ponds, glaciers > 1 km^{2} (0.386 sq mi or 247 acres) and river estuaries.

Juvigny (French pronunciation: [ʒyviɲi]; Savoyard: Zheuvnyi) is a commune in the Haute-Savoie department in the Auvergne-Rhône-Alpes region in south-eastern France.

== See also ==
- Communes of the Haute-Savoie department
