= Étrembières =

Étrembières Étranbîre (Savoyard)
- Commune
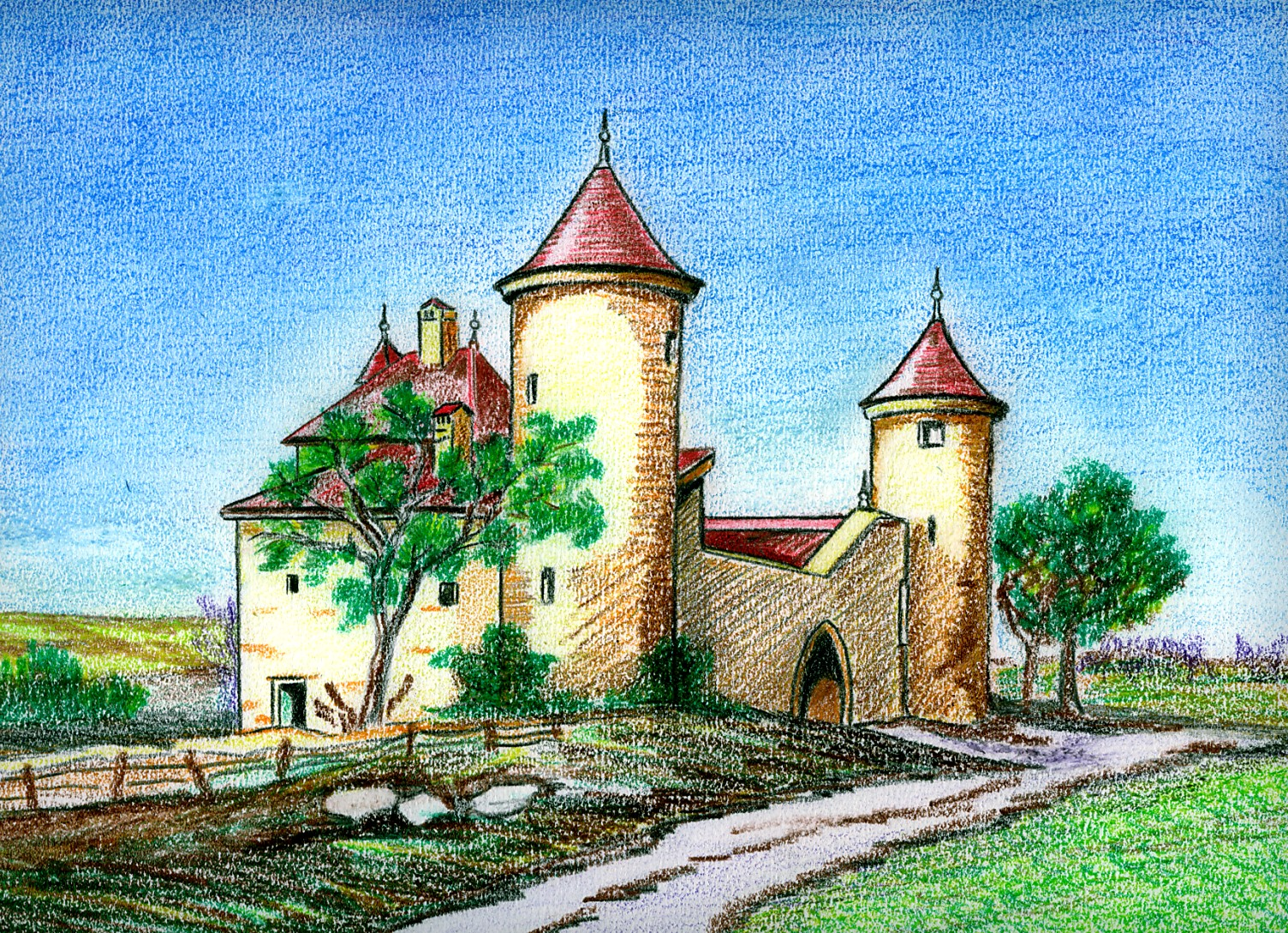
- The Château d'Etrembières

- Flag Coat of arms
- Location of Étrembières
- Location within France Location within Auvergne-Rhône-Alpes
- Coordinates: 46°10′42″N 6°13′36″E
- Country: France
- Region: Auvergne-Rhône-Alpes
- Department: Haute-Savoie
- Arrondissement: Saint-Julien-en-Genevois
- Canton: Gaillard
- Intercommunality: Annemasse – Les Voirons

Government
  - Mayor (2020–2026): Anny Martin
- Area^{1}: 5.43 km^{2} (2.10 sq mi)
- Highest elevation: 860 m (2,820 ft)
- Lowest elevation: 393 m (1,289 ft)
- Population (2023): 2,679
  - Density: 493/km^{2} (1,280/sq mi)
- Time zone: UTC+01:00 (CET)
  - Summer (DST): UTC+02:00 (CEST)
- INSEE/Postal code: 74118 /74100
- ^{1} French Land Register data, which excludes lakes, ponds, glaciers > 1 km^{2} (0.386 sq mi or 247 acres) and river estuaries.

Étrembières (French pronunciation: [etʁɑ̃bjɛʁ]; Savoyard: Étranbîre) is a commune in the Haute-Savoie department in the Auvergne-Rhône-Alpes region in south-eastern France.

== Geography ==
Étrembières territory is a land extension of 8 kilometres (5 mi)long (5 miles), located at foot of mount Salève, and at banks of Arve River, between Annemasse, Gaillard and Bossey communes. The commune has a population of 1600 inhabitants (2006). The Sàleve mount surges at a steep cliff at west producing an inclination to the Arve's river valley. Sàleve mount is composed of two parts. The great Salève (1318 m.) and the small Salève (902 m.) apart from one of the other by the collar of Monnetier.

== History ==
=== Prehistory ===
The region had a prehistoric occupation revealed by excavations, where upper Magdalenian period tools were found, such as stone tools, decorated with otters and Alpine ibex figures.

=== Ancient history ===
The Roman road Genava crossed the Arve river to Etrembières, at the closest area between the banks of the river. A wooden bridge was built to improve the transportation between the two sides; although there is no mention of this bridge in the ancient period, it is mentioned in a 1304 agreement between the Count of Genevois and sire of Faucigny.

=== Middle Ages ===
From the 11th to the 15th centuries, Étrembières, and principally its bridge, was a strategic point of control of the Counts of Genève. During this time the social life of the inhabitants was affected by the frequent battles between the lords and the vassals of Gex, Mornex and Faucigny.

=== L'Escalade ===
After the Calvinist reform in Genovia, an important part of catholic population existed in the small communes of the area. Étrembières is considered a catholic village. After Charles-Emmanuel, the duke of Savoie built the château des Terreaux, in 1602 started a military action to Genève, to recover part of the provinces caused by the signing of Lyon Treaty, in 1601, and to reestablish the Catholicism is the city. The expedition turned into a military disaster that ended with the signing of Saint-Julien treaty in 1603. Genève commemorated the victory with a celebration known as L'Escalade.

=== Turin Treaties ===
After the Turin treaty, in 1754, signed between the Republic of Genoa and the Kingdom of Sardinia, Étrembières formed part of Caroug province, governed by the count of Veyrier. The town became again French in 1792 during the Italian campaign of Napoleon Bonaparte, ending in the Turin treaty of 1816 that reintegrated Étrembières to Kingdom of Sardinia.

=== French annexion ===
On 24 March 1860 by the signing of the Franco-sardinian treaty Savoie was annexed to France, despite Étrembières after a popular plebiscite was favorable to be annexed with Switzerland. As many communes finally integrated the Haute-Savoie department.

=== Modern history ===
In 1875, the plans for building a railway from Annecy to Annemasse were approved, and the following year it was attached to Collonges-Annemasse railway. The joining of this two railways was made at Étrembières. In 1879 a town hall and a school were constructed. In 1891 a Rack railway was built that connected the town to Salève. In 1906 a school was created at l'Échelle pass and in 1922 the village was supplied with electricity. In 1932 the Salève Aerial tramway was inaugurated for replace the Rack Railway that was decommissioned in 1935. In 1960 the commune restored the Étrembières Chapel. It was reopened on 9 April 1972 despite a new church was built at l'Échelle pass on 30 April 1967.

== Demography ==
Historical population
Year	Pop.	±% p.a.
1968	1,187	—
1975	1,314	+1.46%
1982	1,200	−1.29%
1990	1,374	+1.71%
1999	1,430	+0.44%
2007	1,784	+2.80%
2012	2,036	+2.68%
2017	2,453	+3.80%
2023	2,679	+1.48%
Source: INSEE

== Landmarks and monuments ==
=== Castle of Étrembières ===
The Castle of Étrembières was constructed during the 13th century and was inaugurated in the 14th century. In 1328 was owned by a Genoan family, the Compey's. In 1539 the owner of the castle was Marin de Montchenu. In 1589 was used as barracks by the Geonan Troops that invaded Savoie. In 1606 was property of the Annecy hospital. During the 19th century, Daniel Colladon used the castle grounds for test a compressed air drill, used later in the construction of Mont-Cenis tunnel.

=== Castle des Terreaux ===
The château des Terreaux, or "Châtillon Castle", was constructed between the 14th century and the 15th century, located behind the Étrembières castle. In 1474 was ceded to Pierre de Châtillon in occasion of his marriage with Marguerite de Gerbais. Without any descendants, the castle was in 1530 owned by Marius d'Arenthon. In 1654 (and not in 1684 like is indicated in wrong versions), was ceded to François-Marie de la Fléchère, that married with Marie-Claudine d'Arenthon, niece of Genoa Prince Jean d'Arenthon. the last owner was Pierre-Claude de la Fléchère, that lived in the castle in 1722. After he abandoned the Terreaux it turned with the passage of time in ruins.

=== Symond Castle ===
Constructed after the 14th century, the Symond fortress commanded the access to l'Échelle pass, the roads of Salèvand the access to Monnetier village. In 1304 the castle was the property of the Villette family, vassals of Genoa Counts, Later in 1565 owned by Cluses Marquess, Martin du Fresnoy. In 1722, was acquired by Louis de Portes that sold it again, in 1743, to de la Fléchère family. After the death of Veyrier count, the castle was owned by François Diday that lived in it until 1847, the year in which he sold it to a religious congregation, the "Fidèles Compagnes de Jésus". During this period it was a pension until 1901. With any use in 1917, it was used by the red cross during the World War I. After the war, it was used as pension for sons of soldiers defunct during the war, and again was closed in 1932. It was reopened again during World War II for sons of soldiers. After the end of the war the S.N.C.F was property owner until 1957. In 2003 the facilities were closed for not meeting the security rules. Recently, the castle is under repairs.

== See also ==
- Communes of the Haute-Savoie department
