= Hôtel de Ville, Saint-Genis-Laval =

Town hall in Saint-Genis-Laval, France

Hôtel de Ville
- The main frontage of the Hôtel de Ville in April 2023
- Interactive map of the Hôtel de Ville area

General information
- Type: City hall
- Architectural style: Neoclassical style
- Location: Saint-Genis-Laval, France
- Coordinates: 45.6985°N 4.7940°E
- Completed: c.1605

The Hôtel de Ville (French pronunciation: [otɛl də vil], City Hall) is a municipal building in Saint-Genis-Laval, Metropolis of Lyon, in eastern France, standing on Avenue Georges Clemenceau.

== History ==
Villa Chapuis

Following the French Revolution, the new council initially met in the palace of the chanoines-comtes (canon-counts) of Lyon, just to the south of the Church of Saint-Genis. In 1821, the council moved to the former rectory on what is now Rue Pierre-Penel.

In 1888, the council established a municipal office in the old wallpaper factory of Auguste Pignet & Sons on the east side of Grand Rue (now Avenue Georges Clemenceau). The company had sold its wallpaper products, which included panoramic scenes, across France and abroad, before closing in 1840.

In the mid-1930s, the council led by the mayor, Charles Girard, decided to establish a more substantial town hall. The building they selected was the Villa Chapuis, also on the east side of the Grand Rue, just to the north of the previous town hall. The villa had been designed in the Châteauesque style, built in ashlar stone and completed in the 1820s. The design involved a symmetrical main frontage of five bays facing onto the Grand Rue. The central bay featured a square-headed doorway which was surmounted by a balustraded balcony. The building was fenestrated by plain casement windows on the ground floor, by casement windows with pediments on the first floor and by casement windows with cornices on the second floor. The steep roof was surmounted by cresting. It became the home of the composer, Michel Chapuis, whose works included "Le joli mois de mai" (The Lovely Month of May), in the late 19th century. Following Chapuis's death in 1934, the building was acquired by the council in 1937.

In the mid-1970s, following significant population growth, the council led by the mayor, Henri Fillot, again decided to establish a more substantial town hall. The property they selected was the former Couvent des Récollets (Convent of the Recollects) which had been established by the local seigneur, Claude de Gadagne, in 1605. During the French Revolution, the convent was seized by the state, and the friars were driven out. After several changes in ownership, the surviving buildings were acquired by the council in 1977.
