= Machilly =

Machilly Maschlyi (Savoyard)
- Commune
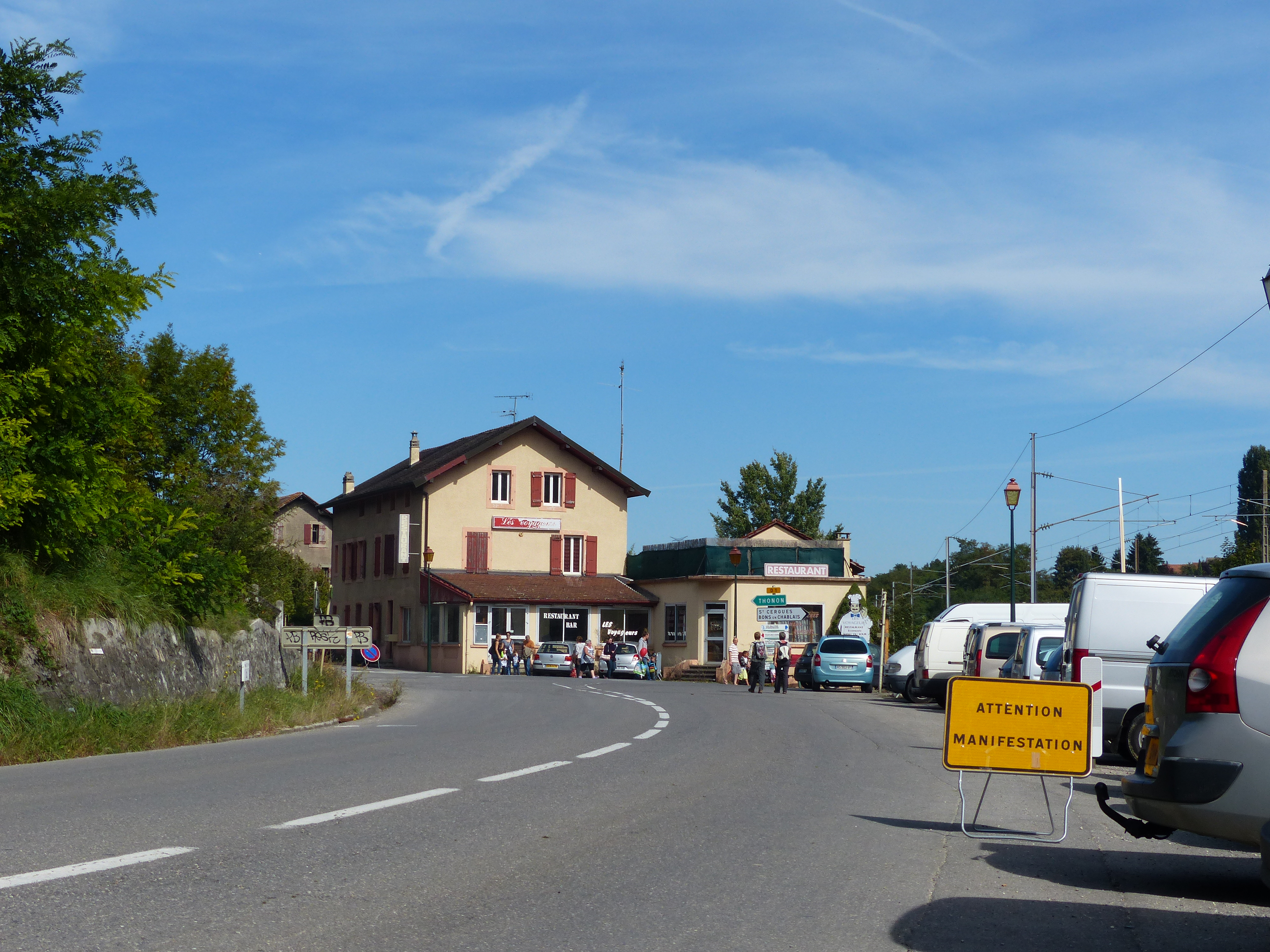
- The road in Machilly

- Coat of arms
- Location of Machilly
- Location within France Location within Auvergne-Rhône-Alpes
- Coordinates: 46°15′08″N 6°19′51″E
- Country: France
- Region: Auvergne-Rhône-Alpes
- Department: Haute-Savoie
- Arrondissement: Saint-Julien-en-Genevois
- Canton: Gaillard
- Intercommunality: Annemasse - Les Voirons Agglomération

Government
  - Mayor (2020–2026): Pauline Plagnat-Cantoreggi
- Area^{1}: 5.76 km^{2} (2.22 sq mi)
- Highest elevation: 1,129 m (3,704 ft)
- Lowest elevation: 459 m (1,506 ft)
- Population (2023): 1,152
  - Density: 200/km^{2} (518/sq mi)
- Demonym: Machillien
- Time zone: UTC+01:00 (CET)
  - Summer (DST): UTC+02:00 (CEST)
- INSEE/Postal code: 74158 /74140
- Website: Machilly.fr
- ^{1} French Land Register data, which excludes lakes, ponds, glaciers > 1 km^{2} (0.386 sq mi or 247 acres) and river estuaries.

Machilly (French pronunciation: [maʃiji]; Savoyard: Maschlyi) is a commune in the Haute-Savoie department in the Auvergne-Rhône-Alpes region in south-eastern France.

== See also ==
- Communes of the Haute-Savoie department
