= A Man Escaped =

1956 French film by Robert Bresson

- Directed by: Robert Bresson
- Written by: Robert Bresson
- Based on: a memoir by André Devigny
- Produced by: Alain Poiré; Jean Thuillier
- Starring: François Leterrier; Charles Le Clainche; Maurice Beerblock; Roland Monod
- Cinematography: Léonce-Henri Burel
- Edited by: Raymond Lamy
- Music by: Wolfgang Amadeus Mozart
- Production company: Société Nouvelle des Établissements Gaumont
- Distributed by: Gaumont Distribution
- Release date: 11 November 1956
- Running time: 99 minutes
- Country: France
- Languages: French, German

A Man Escaped, also known as A Man Escaped or The Wind Bloweth Where It Listeth (French: Un condamné à mort s'est échappé ou Le Vent souffle où il veut), is a 1956 French prison film directed by Robert Bresson. The film is loosely based on the memoir of André Devigny, a member of the French Resistance who was imprisoned by the occupying German forces at Montluc prison during World War II. Although the protagonist's name is altered in the film, it is inspired by Devigny's real-life escape.

A Man Escaped was screened in competition at the 1957 Cannes Film Festival and remains one of Bresson's most acclaimed and influential works.

== Plot ==
In Lyon, in 1943, Fontaine, a member of the French Resistance, jumps out of the car that is taking him to Montluc prison. He is immediately apprehended, and his German captors handcuff him, beat him, and lock him up. Throughout his time in prison, Fontaine regularly hears gunfire as other inmates are executed.

At first, Fontaine is placed in a cell on the ground floor of Montluc. He communicates with his neighbor by tapping on the wall and is regularly able to talk through his window to Terry, a member of a small group allowed to exercise unsupervised in a courtyard. Terry takes Fontaine's letters to his family and superiors in the Resistance and gets him a safety pin so he can remove his handcuffs.

After fifteen days, Fontaine is moved to a cell on the top floor of Montluc, and he is no longer required to wear handcuffs. His new neighbor, Blanchet, is an elderly man who refuses to respond to his taps on the wall. Fontaine gets to know several other inmates on his daily trips to empty his slop bucket and wash his face, even though the guards regularly admonish them for talking. After Blanchet faints while emptying his slop bucket, he and Fontaine begin to talk to each other at their windows.

Fontaine notices that the wooden door of his cell is made up of thick boards joined together by a softer wood. He sharpens the end of a spoon and begins chiseling away at the joints. After weeks of slow, silent, and meticulous work—which involves keeping track of and disposing of every wood shaving, as well as camouflaging the damage he is doing to the door—he is able to get out of his cell into the hallway at will. He makes some rope using most of his linens and the wire from his bed frame.

Some of Fontaine's fellow inmates begin to believe he may have found a way to escape from Montluc. Orsini, who helped alert Fontaine to approaching guards while he was chiseling at his door, asks to join the escape. Fontaine shares his plan with Orsini, but Orsini thinks it is too complicated. Instead, he tries to make a run for it one day as the inmates walk outside to empty their slop buckets. He is caught and returned to his cell to await execution. He tells Fontaine to fashion hooks to scale the prison walls from the frame of the lighting fixture in his cell.

Fontaine makes more rope out of some cloth items he receives in a package, and Blanchet donates a blanket to his escape effort. However, as time goes on, the other inmates begin to doubt that Fontaine will ever really try to escape. One prisoner refuses to join his plan, calling it unrealistic.

Shortly after learning that he has been sentenced to death, Fontaine is given a cellmate. The young soldier, François Jost, says he has been convicted of desertion, but Fontaine suspects he may have been planted by the Nazis to gather information. Fontaine spends time assessing Jost and ultimately decides to trust the boy and escape with him, knowing he would have to kill him otherwise.

One day, Fontaine says his goodbyes and reveals his plan to Jost. Jost realizes he has no real choice and agrees, helping to make more rope. That night, the pair go into the hallway and reach the roof via a skylight. Fontaine slowly leads the way across the roof, taking advantage of the auditory cover provided by passing trains. They descend into a courtyard, where Fontaine kills a German guard. The two climb a building and hook a rope across the gap between the inner and outer walls of the prison compound, but Fontaine loses his nerve and just sits there. Hours later, he finally shimmies across the rope and drops down into the streets of Lyon. He and Jost walk away from Montluc undetected.

== Cast ==
- François Leterrier as Lieutenant Fontaine
- Charles Le Clainche as François Jost
- Maurice Beerblock as Blanchet
- Roland Monod as Pastor Deleyris
- Jacques Ertaud as Orsini
- Jean-Paul Delhumeau as Hebrard
- Roger Treherne as Terry
- Jean-Philippe Delamarre as Prisoner 110
- César Gattegno as Prisoner X
- Jacques Oerlemans as the head guard
- Klaus Detlef Grevenhorst as the Abwehr officer
- Leonhard Schmidt as the escort guard

== Production ==
The film is based on the memoirs of André Devigny, a member of the French Resistance and Compagnon de la Libération who escaped from Montluc prison in Lyon in 1943. Bresson had also been held by the Germans during WWII, though as a prisoner of war.

In an interview, Bresson said that, with A Man Escaped, he "wanted to achieve a great purity, a greater asceticism than in Diary of a Country Priest", noting his use of nonprofessional actors. The music that appears several times in the film is the Kyrie from Mozart's Great Mass in C minor, K. 427.

== Reception and legacy ==
Bresson won Best Director at the 1957 Cannes Film Festival. The film was named by the National Board of Review as one of the best foreign films of 1956.

Today, the work is sometimes considered Bresson's masterpiece. It was ranked 69th in the 2012 Sight & Sound critics' poll. Roger Ebert wrote: "Watching a film like A Man Escaped is like a lesson in the cinema. It teaches by demonstration all the sorts of things that are not necessary in a movie. By implication, it suggests most of the things we're accustomed to are superfluous. I can't think of a single unnecessary shot in A Man Escaped."

Polish filmmaker Krzysztof Kieślowski was influenced by the film and ranked it as one of the top ten films that "affected" him the most. British-American filmmaker Christopher Nolan was influenced by the film (along with Pickpocket) when making Dunkirk (2017).

Benny Safdie of the Safdie Brothers named the film as his favorite of all time. American-British singer Scott Walker also listed the film as one of his all-time favorites.

On the review aggregator website Rotten Tomatoes, 100% of 41 critics' reviews are positive, with an average rating of 9.6/10. The website's consensus reads: "A Man Escaped is blockbuster Bresson, a well-acted POW drama that builds with subtle, seat-gripping tension."

== Home video releases ==
New Yorker Video released the film on Region 1 DVD in 2004 (this release is out of print). Artificial Eye put out a Region 2 release in the UK in April 2008, which contains a superior audio/video presentation and features the 1984 Dutch documentary The Road to Bresson as an extra. Madman Entertainment released a Region 4 Australian DVD in July 2009, which contains a scholarly audio commentary by Professor Ross Gibson of the Sydney College of the Arts, University of Sydney.

Gaumont released the film on Blu-ray in France in November 2010.

The film was released by the Criterion Collection in March 2013 on Region A Blu-ray and Region 1 DVD. Supplementary features included with this release include "Bresson: Without a Trace", the 1965 episode of the French television program Cinéastes de notre temps that features the director's first on-camera interview; The Road to Bresson, which features interviews with filmmakers Andrei Tarkovsky, Louis Malle, and Paul Schrader; The Essence of Forms, a 2010 French documentary in which collaborators and admirers of Bresson, including actor François Leterrier and director Bruno Dumont, share their thoughts about the director and his work; and "Functions of Film Sound", a visual essay on the use of sound in A Man Escaped, which features narration taken from a chapter about the film in Film Art: An Introduction by film scholars David Bordwell and Kristin Thompson.
