= Gaillard =

Gaillard Guèlyâr (Savoyard)
- Commune
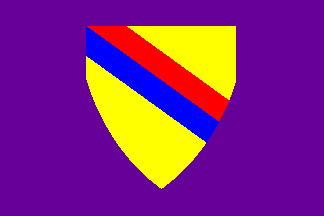
- Flag Coat of arms
- Location of Gaillard
- Location within France Location within Auvergne-Rhône-Alpes
- Coordinates: 46°11′09″N 6°12′30″E
- Country: France
- Region: Auvergne-Rhône-Alpes
- Department: Haute-Savoie
- Arrondissement: Saint-Julien-en-Genevois
- Canton: Gaillard
- Intercommunality: Annemasse – Les Voirons

Government
  - Mayor (2023–2026): Antoine Blouin
- Area^{1}: 4.02 km^{2} (1.55 sq mi)
- Elevation: 420 m (1,380 ft)
- Highest elevation: 425 m (1,394 ft)
- Lowest elevation: 392 m (1,286 ft)
- Population (2023): 11,423
  - Density: 2,840/km^{2} (7,360/sq mi)
- Time zone: UTC+01:00 (CET)
  - Summer (DST): UTC+02:00 (CEST)
- INSEE/Postal code: 74133 /74240
- ^{1} French Land Register data, which excludes lakes, ponds, glaciers > 1 km^{2} (0.386 sq mi or 247 acres) and river estuaries.

Gaillard (French pronunciation: [ɡajaʁ]; Savoyard: Guèlyâr) is a commune in the Haute-Savoie department in the Auvergne-Rhône-Alpes region in south-eastern France.

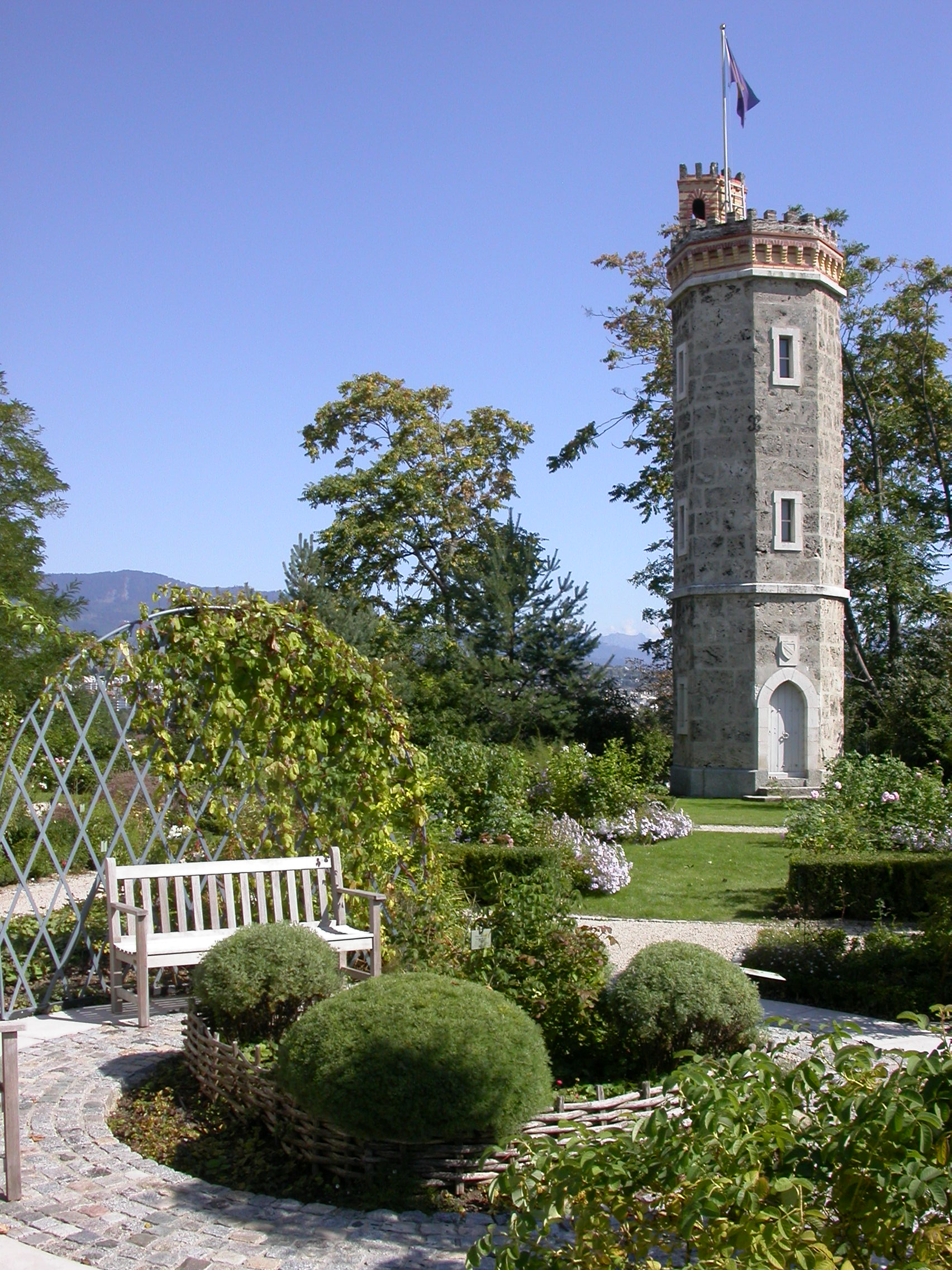
Roseraie et Tour de Naz

Gaillard lies on the border with Switzerland, 5 km east of the city centre of Geneva. The biggest border crossing is called Moillesulaz and the second one is Fossard.

== Population ==
Historical population
Year	Pop.	±% p.a.
1968	6,233	—
1975	9,027	+5.43%
1982	9,079	+0.08%
1990	9,592	+0.69%
1999	9,949	+0.41%
2007	11,397	+1.71%
2012	11,303	−0.17%
2017	10,619	−1.24%
2023	11,423	+1.22%
Source: INSEE

== Climate ==
Climate data for Gaillard, elevation 399 m (1,309 ft), (1991–2020 normals, extremes 1987–present)
Month	Jan	Feb	Mar	Apr	May	Jun	Jul	Aug	Sep	Oct	Nov	Dec	Year
Record high °C (°F)	19.2 (66.6)	21.0 (69.8)	26.0 (78.8)	29.9 (85.8)	33.9 (93.0)	37.3 (99.1)	38.8 (101.8)	40.0 (104.0)	34.1 (93.4)	27.9 (82.2)	24.3 (75.7)	19.9 (67.8)	40.0 (104.0)
Mean daily maximum °C (°F)	5.7 (42.3)	7.9 (46.2)	13.0 (55.4)	17.1 (62.8)	21.2 (70.2)	25.2 (77.4)	27.6 (81.7)	27.2 (81.0)	22.1 (71.8)	16.5 (61.7)	10.0 (50.0)	6.1 (43.0)	16.6 (61.9)
Daily mean °C (°F)	2.3 (36.1)	3.3 (37.9)	7.2 (45.0)	10.8 (51.4)	15.0 (59.0)	18.8 (65.8)	20.9 (69.6)	20.5 (68.9)	16.2 (61.2)	11.7 (53.1)	6.2 (43.2)	2.9 (37.2)	11.3 (52.3)
Mean daily minimum °C (°F)	−1.1 (30.0)	−1.2 (29.8)	1.4 (34.5)	4.5 (40.1)	8.8 (47.8)	12.3 (54.1)	14.1 (57.4)	13.7 (56.7)	10.3 (50.5)	6.9 (44.4)	2.4 (36.3)	−0.3 (31.5)	6.0 (42.8)
Record low °C (°F)	−12.5 (9.5)	−13.0 (8.6)	−10.6 (12.9)	−5.5 (22.1)	−0.7 (30.7)	2.5 (36.5)	6.0 (42.8)	5.0 (41.0)	1.0 (33.8)	−4.6 (23.7)	−9.0 (15.8)	−12.8 (9.0)	−13.0 (8.6)
Average precipitation mm (inches)	63.0 (2.48)	54.4 (2.14)	63.1 (2.48)	75.5 (2.97)	89.3 (3.52)	87.4 (3.44)	82.8 (3.26)	88.0 (3.46)	96.0 (3.78)	97.5 (3.84)	87.6 (3.45)	82.0 (3.23)	966.6 (38.06)
Average precipitation days (≥ 1.0 mm)	10.0	8.7	9.3	9.0	11.0	9.5	9.1	8.7	8.4	10.3	10.5	11.0	115.4
Source: Meteociel

== See also ==
- Communes of the Haute-Savoie department
