= Bossey =

Bossey Bossè (Arpitan)
- Commune
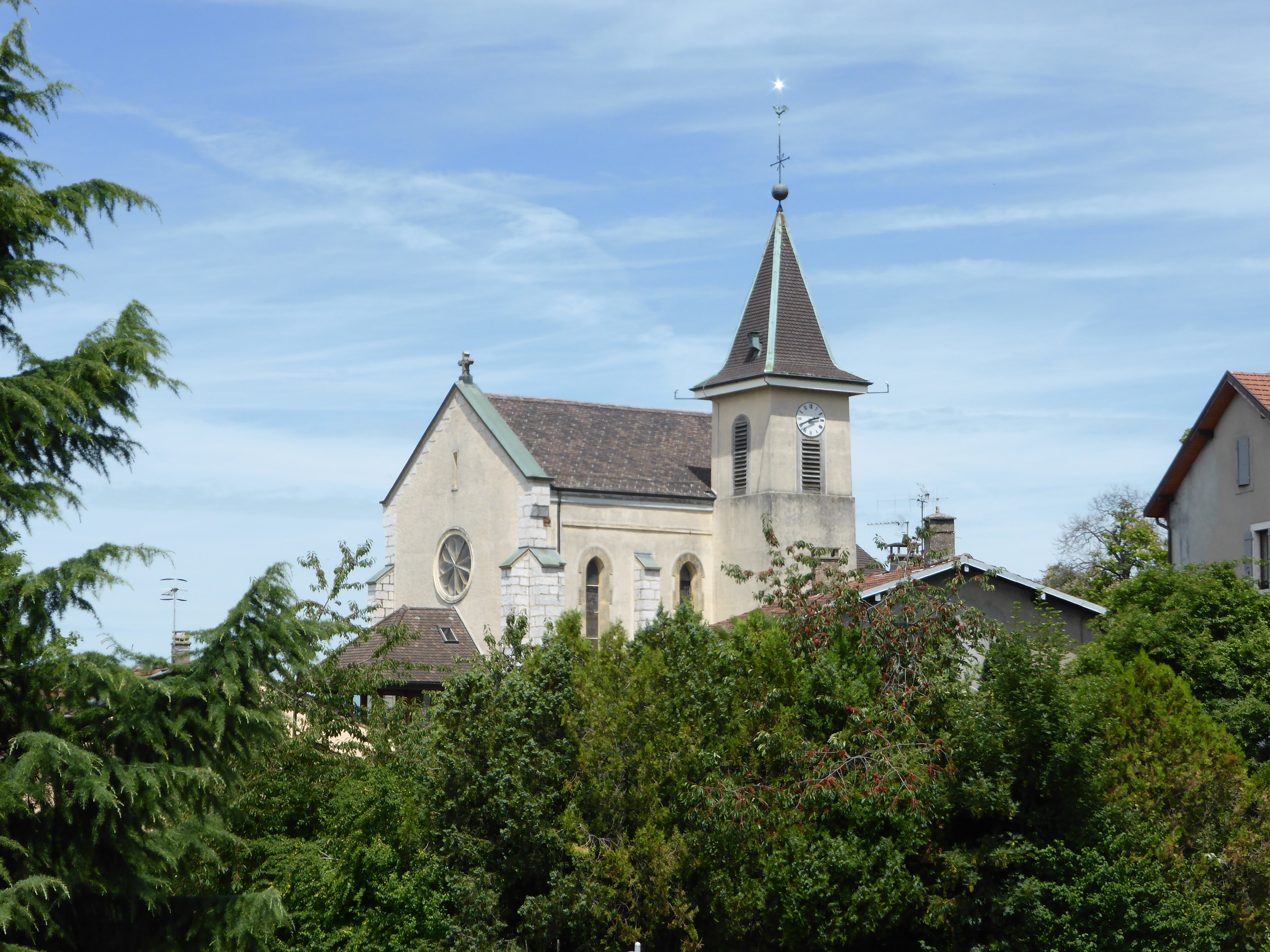
- The church in Bossey
- Location of Bossey
- Location within France Location within Auvergne-Rhône-Alpes
- Coordinates: 46°09′09″N 6°09′36″E
- Country: France
- Region: Auvergne-Rhône-Alpes
- Department: Haute-Savoie
- Arrondissement: Saint-Julien-en-Genevois
- Canton: Saint-Julien-en-Genevois
- Intercommunality: CC du Genevois

Government
  - Mayor (2020–2026): Jean-Luc Pecorini
- Area^{1}: 3.88 km^{2} (1.50 sq mi)
- Highest elevation: 1,251 m (4,104 ft)
- Lowest elevation: 430 m (1,410 ft)
- Population (2023): 941
  - Density: 243/km^{2} (628/sq mi)
- Time zone: UTC+01:00 (CET)
  - Summer (DST): UTC+02:00 (CEST)
- INSEE/Postal code: 74044 /74160
- Website: www.bossey74.fr
- ^{1} French Land Register data, which excludes lakes, ponds, glaciers > 1 km^{2} (0.386 sq mi or 247 acres) and river estuaries.

Bossey (French pronunciation: [bɔsɛ]; Arpitan: Bossè) is a commune in the Haute-Savoie department in the Auvergne-Rhône-Alpes region in Eastern France. It is located on the Swiss border. As of 2023, the population of the commune was 941.

== Personalities ==
Bossey is the birthplace of poet Jean-Vincent Verdonnet (1923–2013). Philosopher and political theorist Jean-Jacques Rousseau (1712–1778) lived in the village between 1722 and 1724.

== See also ==
- Communes of the Haute-Savoie department
