= Lucinges =

Lucinges Leçinjos (Arpitan)
- Commune
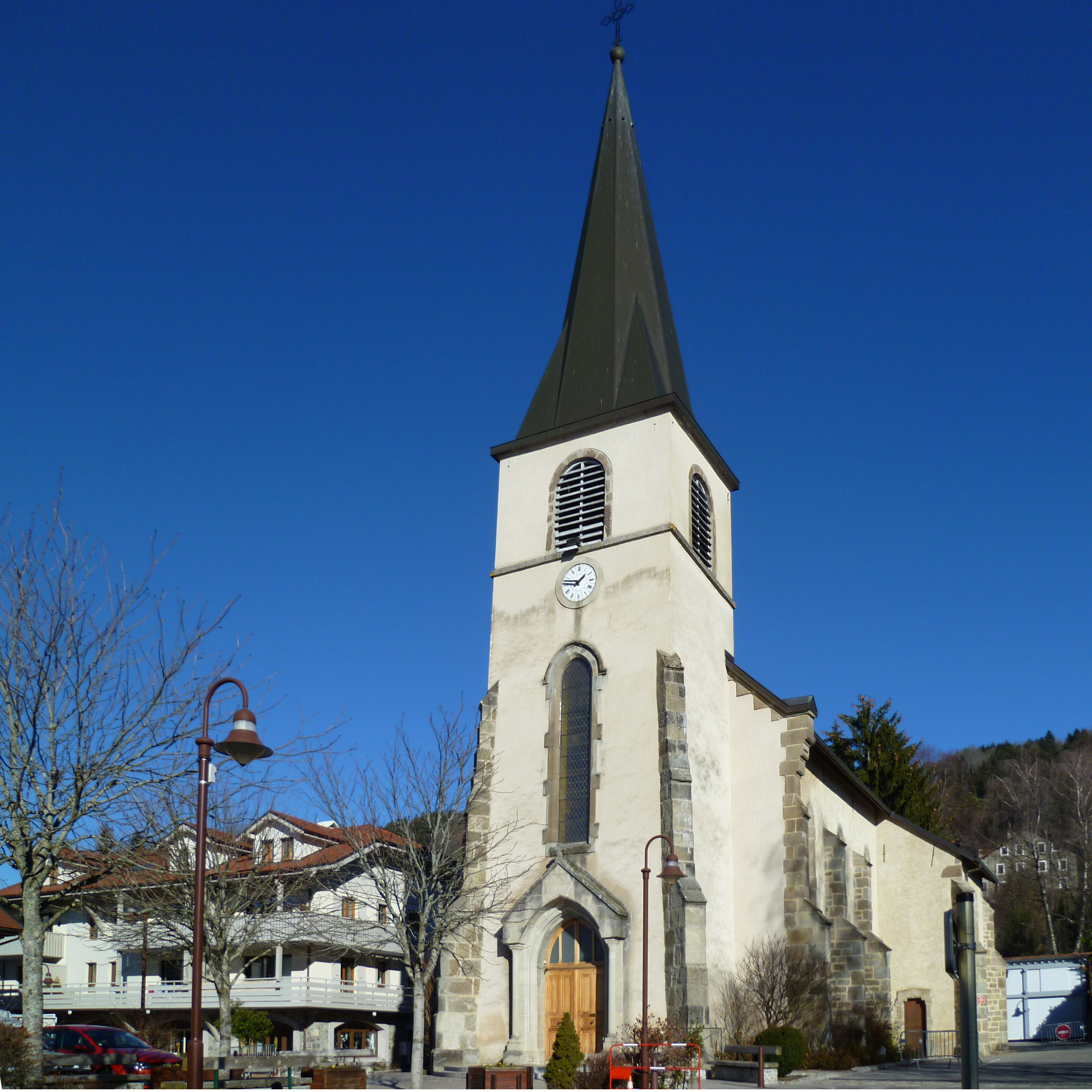
- The church in Lucinges

- Coat of arms
- Location of Lucinges
- Location within France Location within Auvergne-Rhône-Alpes
- Coordinates: 46°11′26″N 6°19′08″E
- Country: France
- Region: Auvergne-Rhône-Alpes
- Department: Haute-Savoie
- Arrondissement: Saint-Julien-en-Genevois
- Canton: Gaillard
- Intercommunality: Annemasse - Les Voirons Agglomération

Government
  - Mayor (2020–2026): Jean-Luc Soulat
- Area^{1}: 7.69 km^{2} (2.97 sq mi)
- Highest elevation: 1,400 m (4,600 ft)
- Lowest elevation: 525 m (1,722 ft)
- Population (2023): 1,819
  - Density: 237/km^{2} (613/sq mi)
- Time zone: UTC+01:00 (CET)
  - Summer (DST): UTC+02:00 (CEST)
- INSEE/Postal code: 74153 /74380
- Website: Lucinges.fr
- ^{1} French Land Register data, which excludes lakes, ponds, glaciers > 1 km^{2} (0.386 sq mi or 247 acres) and river estuaries.

Lucinges (French pronunciation: [lysɛ̃ʒ]; Arpitan: Leçinjos) is a commune in the Haute-Savoie department in the Auvergne-Rhône-Alpes region in south-eastern France.

== Geography ==
Lucinges is located 8 kilometres (5.0 mi) of Annemasse.

== See also ==
- Communes of the Haute-Savoie department
