= Saint-Cergues =

Saint-Cergues San-Fargo (Savoyard)
- Commune
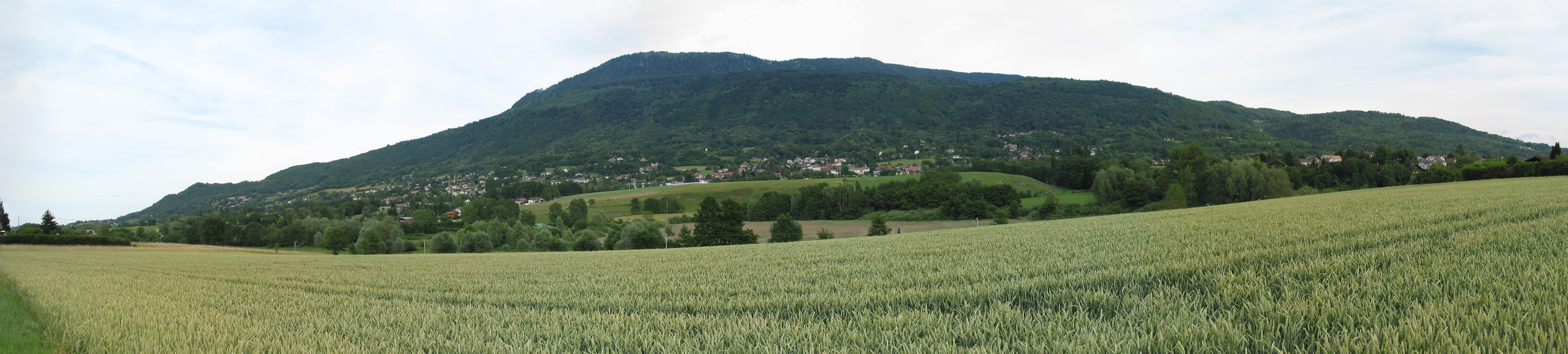
- The landscape around Saint-Cergues

- Coat of arms
- Location of Saint-Cergues
- Location within France Location within Auvergne-Rhône-Alpes
- Coordinates: 46°14′08″N 6°19′18″E
- Country: France
- Region: Auvergne-Rhône-Alpes
- Department: Haute-Savoie
- Arrondissement: Saint-Julien-en-Genevois
- Canton: Gaillard
- Intercommunality: Annemasse – Les Voirons

Government
  - Mayor (2020–2026): Gabriel Doublet
- Area^{1}: 12.55 km^{2} (4.85 sq mi)
- Highest elevation: 1,480 m (4,860 ft)
- Lowest elevation: 486 m (1,594 ft)
- Population (2023): 3,869
  - Density: 308.3/km^{2} (798.5/sq mi)
- Demonym: Saint-cerguois
- Time zone: UTC+01:00 (CET)
  - Summer (DST): UTC+02:00 (CEST)
- INSEE/Postal code: 74229 /74140
- ^{1} French Land Register data, which excludes lakes, ponds, glaciers > 1 km^{2} (0.386 sq mi or 247 acres) and river estuaries.

Saint-Cergues (French pronunciation: [sɛ̃ sɛʁɡ]; Savoyard: San-Fargo) is a commune in the Haute-Savoie department in the Auvergne-Rhône-Alpes region in south-eastern France.

== Population ==
Historical population
| Year | Pop. | ±% p.a. |
|---|---|---|
| 1968 | 1,291 | — |
| 1975 | 1,830 | +5.11% |
| 1982 | 2,088 | +1.90% |
| 1990 | 2,337 | +1.42% |
| 1999 | 2,513 | +0.81% |
| 2007 | 3,001 | +2.24% |
| 2012 | 3,297 | +1.90% |
| 2017 | 3,613 | +1.85% |
| 2023 | 3,869 | +1.15% |
Source: INSEE

== See also ==
- Communes of the Haute-Savoie department
