= Jean-Vincent Verdonnet =

French poet

- Born: 19 April 1923; Bossey, Haute-Savoie, France
- Died: 16 September 2013 (aged 90); Vétraz-Monthoux, France
- Writing career
- Language: French
- Years active: 1951–2009
- Notable awards: Prix Guillaume Apollinaire, Prix Paul Verlaine of the Académie française, Prix des Gens de lettres, Grand Prix du Mont-Saint-Michel

Jean-Vincent Verdonnet (French pronunciation: [ʒɑ̃ vɛ̃sɑ̃ vɛʁdɔnɛ]; 19 April 1923 in Bossey Haute-Savoie – 16 September 2013 in Vétraz-Monthoux) was a French poet, close to the École de Rochefort.

He received numerous literary prizes including

- 1985: the prix Guillaume Apollinaire
- 1995: the Prix Paul Verlaine of the Académie française
- the Prix des Gens de lettres
- the Grand Prix du Mont-Saint-Michel

== Works ==
- 1951: Attente du jour, Les Cahiers du Nouvel Humanisme
- 1952: Noël avec les morts réconciliés, Cahiers de Rochefort
- 1966: Album d'avril, Hautebise
- 1967: Le Temps de vivre, Club du poème
- 1971: Lanterne sourde, Formes et Langages, Prix Archon-Despérouses of the Académie française
- 1972: Cairn, Formes et Langages
- 1974: L'Écorce écrit son testament, Formes et Langages
- 1974: S'il neige dans ta voix, Saint-Germain-des-Prés
- 1976: Arc-en-ciel, Henry Fagne (Belgium)
- 1976: D'Ailleurs, Saint-Germain-des-Prés
- 1977: Pénombre mûre, Rougerie
- 1979: La Faille où la mémoire hiverne, Saint-Germain-des-Prés
- 1979: Pour tout viatique, Verticales 12
- 1980: Au temps profils furtifs, Rougerie
- 1981: Espère et tremble, Rougerie
- 1984: Ce qui demeure, Rougerie
- 1984: La Quête inachevée, pour une approche de Gustave Roud, Éditions des Voirons
- 1984: Poèmes-missives, Guilde du Poème
- 1987: Fugitif éclat de l'être, Rougerie
- 1990: Dans l'intervalle, L'Arbre à paroles
- 1992: À chaque pas prenant congé, Rougerie
- 1994: Où s'anime une trace (tome I), Rougerie
- 1995: Copeaux, éditions Voix d'encre
- 1995: À l'espère tu me rejoins, Rougerie
- 1996: Où s'anime une trace (tome II), Rougerie
- 1997: Où s'anime une trace (tome III), Rougerie
- 1999: Où s'anime une trace (tome IV), Rougerie
- 2001: D'un temps soucieux d'éternité, drawings by Yves Mairot, Voix d'encre
- 2002: Ce battement de la parole, Rougerie
- 2003: Droit d'asile, calligraphies by Henri Renoux, Voix d'encre
- 2005: Ombre aux doigts de sourcier, illustrations by Claire Nicole, Voix d'encre
- 2006: Jours déchaux, Rougerie
- 2008: Mots en maraude, illustrations by Marie-Claire Enevoldsen-Bussat, Voix d'encre
- 2009: Jean-Vincent Verdonnet, l'art de vivre en poésie. Lecture by Marie-Claire Enevoldsen-Bussat followed by unpublished poems by Jean-Vincent Verdonnet, Éditions Le Tour
