= Canton of Gaillard =

Coordinates: 46.19°N 6.21°E

The canton of Gaillard is an administrative division of the Haute-Savoie department, southeastern France. It was created at the French canton reorganisation which came into effect in March 2015. Its seat is in Gaillard.

It consists of the following communes:

1. Arthaz-Pont-Notre-Dame
2. Bonne
3. Cranves-Sales
4. Étrembières
5. Gaillard
6. Juvigny
7. Lucinges
8. Machilly
9. Saint-Cergues
10. Vétraz-Monthoux
