= Boëge =

Boëge Bouèjo (Arpitan)
- Commune
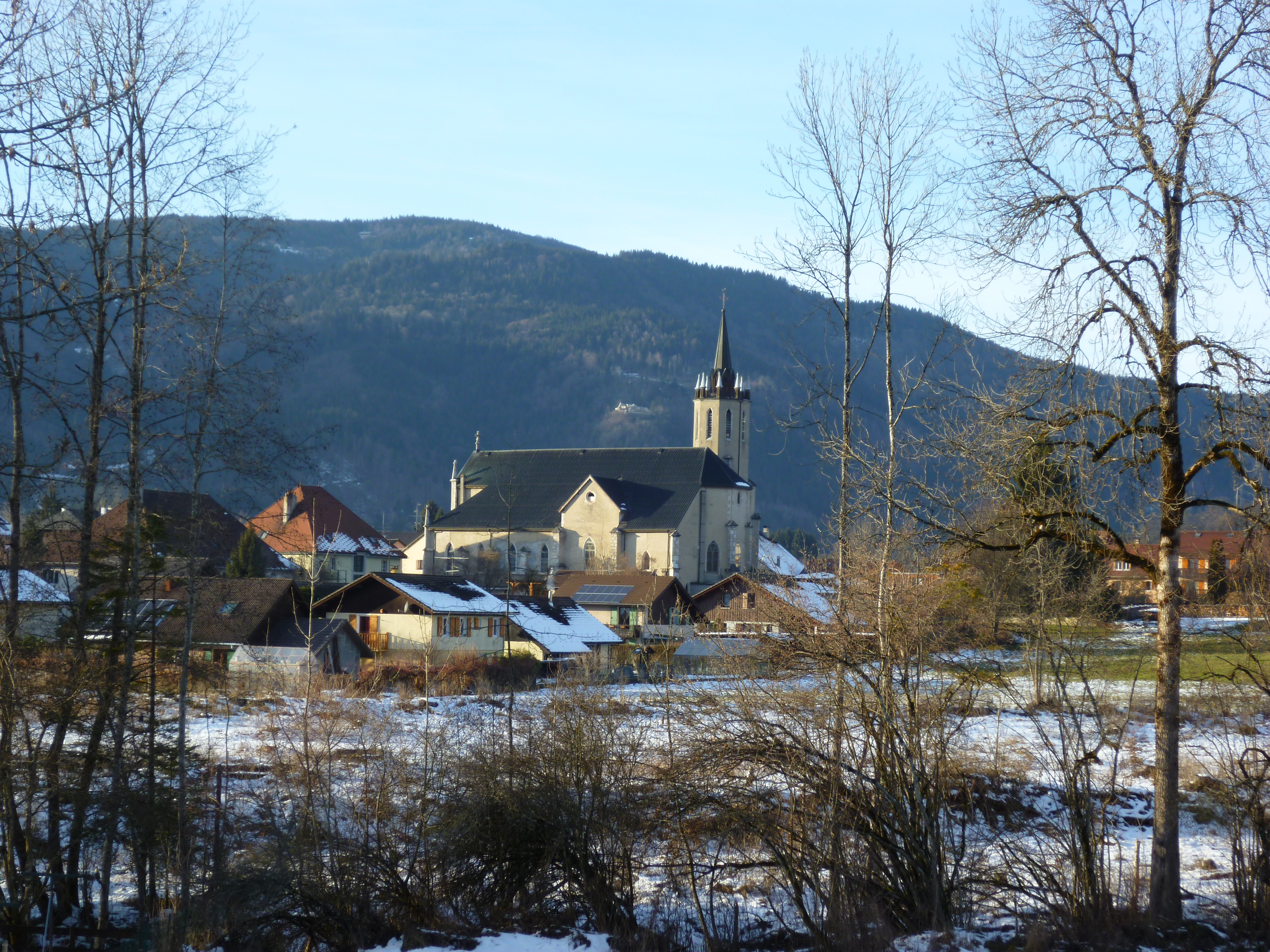
- The church in Boëge

- Coat of arms
- Location of Boëge
- Location within France Location within Auvergne-Rhône-Alpes
- Coordinates: 46°12′35″N 6°24′20″E
- Country: France
- Region: Auvergne-Rhône-Alpes
- Department: Haute-Savoie
- Arrondissement: Thonon-les-Bains
- Canton: Sciez

Government
  - Mayor (2020–2026): Fabienne Scherrer
- Area^{1}: 16 km^{2} (6.2 sq mi)
- Highest elevation: 1,480 m (4,860 ft)
- Lowest elevation: 713 m (2,339 ft)
- Population (2023): 1,983
  - Density: 120/km^{2} (320/sq mi)
- Time zone: UTC+01:00 (CET)
  - Summer (DST): UTC+02:00 (CEST)
- INSEE/Postal code: 74037 /74420
- ^{1} French Land Register data, which excludes lakes, ponds, glaciers > 1 km^{2} (0.386 sq mi or 247 acres) and river estuaries.

Boëge (French pronunciation: [bɔɛʒ]; Arpitan: Bouèjo) is a commune in the Haute-Savoie department in the Auvergne-Rhône-Alpes region in south-eastern France.

== Population ==
Historical population
Year	Pop.	±% p.a.
1968	843	—
1975	724	−2.15%
1982	1,025	+5.09%
1990	1,267	+2.68%
1999	1,415	+1.24%
2007	1,540	+1.06%
2012	1,714	+2.16%
2017	1,765	+0.59%
2023	1,983	+1.96%
Source: INSEE

== See also ==
- Communes of the Haute-Savoie department
