= Cranves-Sales =

Cranves-Sales Cranges (Arpitan)
- Commune
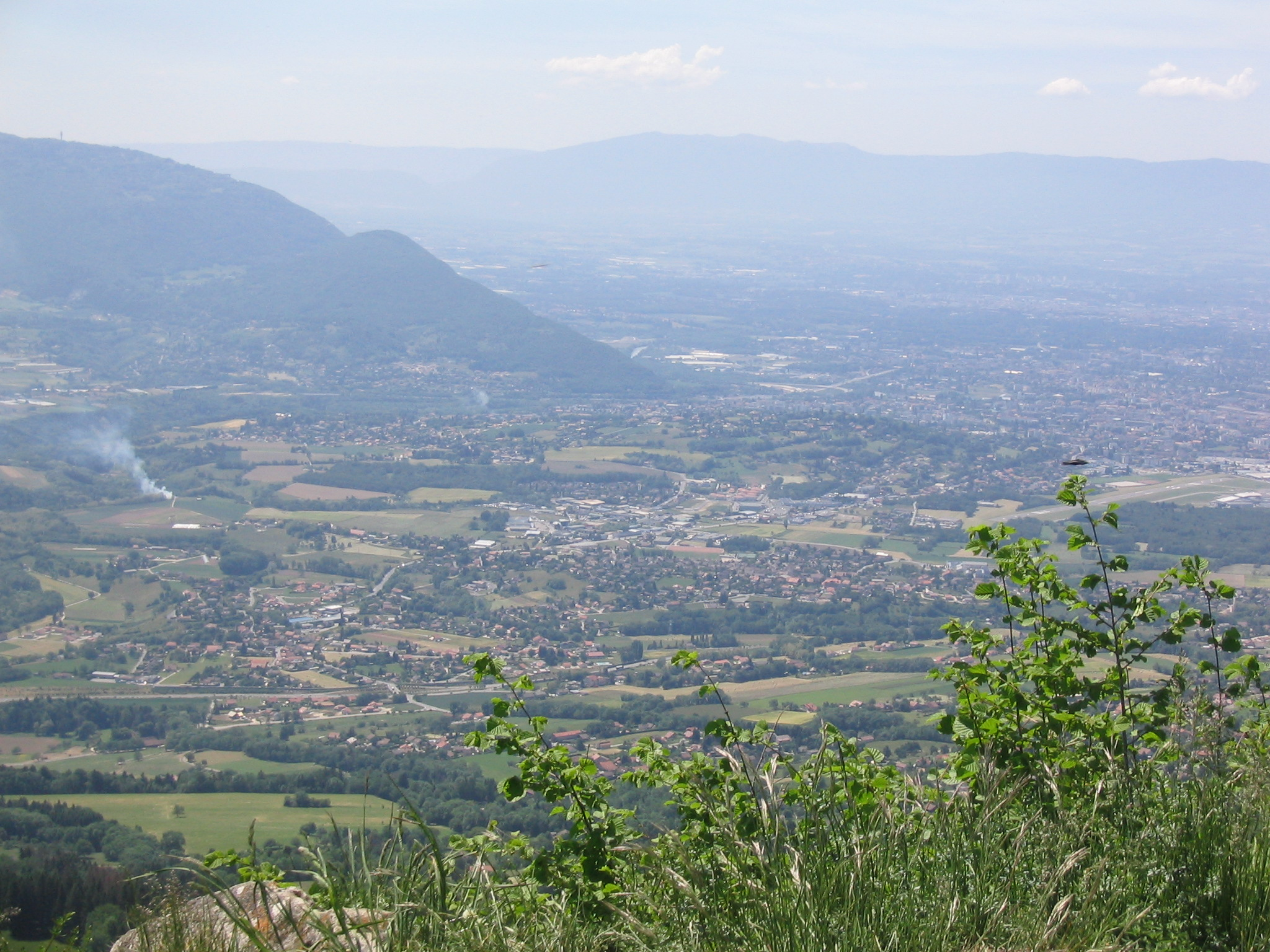
- An aerial view of Cranves-Sales

- Coat of arms
- Location of Cranves-Sales
- Location within France Location within Auvergne-Rhône-Alpes
- Coordinates: 46°11′15″N 6°17′31″E
- Country: France
- Region: Auvergne-Rhône-Alpes
- Department: Haute-Savoie
- Arrondissement: Saint-Julien-en-Genevois
- Canton: Gaillard
- Intercommunality: Annemasse - Les Voirons Agglomération

Government
  - Mayor (2020–2026): Bernard Boccard
- Area^{1}: 13.6 km^{2} (5.3 sq mi)
- Highest elevation: 1,440 m (4,720 ft)
- Lowest elevation: 439 m (1,440 ft)
- Population (2023): 7,762
  - Density: 571/km^{2} (1,480/sq mi)
- Time zone: UTC+01:00 (CET)
  - Summer (DST): UTC+02:00 (CEST)
- INSEE/Postal code: 74094 /74380
- Website: http://www.cranves-sales.fr/
- ^{1} French Land Register data, which excludes lakes, ponds, glaciers > 1 km^{2} (0.386 sq mi or 247 acres) and river estuaries.

Cranves-Sales (French pronunciation: [kʁɑ̃v sal]; Arpitan: Cranges) is a commune in the Haute-Savoie department in the Auvergne-Rhône-Alpes region in south-eastern France.

== Population ==
Historical population
Year	Pop.	±% p.a.
1968	1,296	—
1975	2,001	+6.40%
1982	2,753	+4.66%
1990	3,931	+4.55%
1999	4,358	+1.15%
2007	5,059	+1.88%
2012	5,976	+3.39%
2017	6,793	+2.60%
2023	7,762	+2.25%
Source: INSEE

== See also ==
- Communes of the Haute-Savoie department
