= Vallée Verte =

Valley on the French side of the Chablais Alps

Coordinates: 46°13′N 6°26′E

The Vallée Verte (literally: Green Valley) is a valley in the Chablais Alps, about 15 kilometres south of Thonon-les-Bains in the Haute-Savoie area of France. The river Menoge flows through it. It has as south-southwest orientation and a length of about 20 kilometres. Many of its inhabitants work near Geneva or Annemasse. Tourism is important to the local economy; though once important, agriculture and forestry have declined since the end of the 20th century.
