= Josephus Andreas Fodor =

Dutch violinist and composer

Josephus Andreas Fodor (21 January 1751 – 3 October 1828) was a Dutch violinist and composer of the Classical era.

== Life ==
Josephus Andreas Fodor was born in Venlo, the son of a squire who had been stationed in Hanover, and his wife Maria Elisabeth Messemaecker, who came from a musical family. He first learned the violin in Venlo before being sent to Berlin for further study with Franz Benda. In 1780, he moved to Paris, where he made his successful debut at the Concert Spirituel on 8 June 1791. After this, he traveled as a virtuoso performer on the violin, and also taught in Paris. In his Six Duos à deux Violons, Op. 10 (Published Amsterdam: J.J. Hummel, n.d. [1784]), he described himself as the Premier Violon de la Musique de Monseigneur le Duc de Montmorency. In 1792, he began working at the imperial court in Saint Petersburg where he remained for the rest of his life.

His brothers Carel Emanuel (1759 – ca. 1799) and Carel Anton (1768–1846) both found success as composers and keyboard players.

== Works ==
A large number of works by Fodor were published during his lifetime, including violin concertos, duos for 2 violins, string quartets, airs with variations, violin sonatas and arrangements of works by other composers.
