= Bonne, Haute-Savoie =

Bonne
- Commune
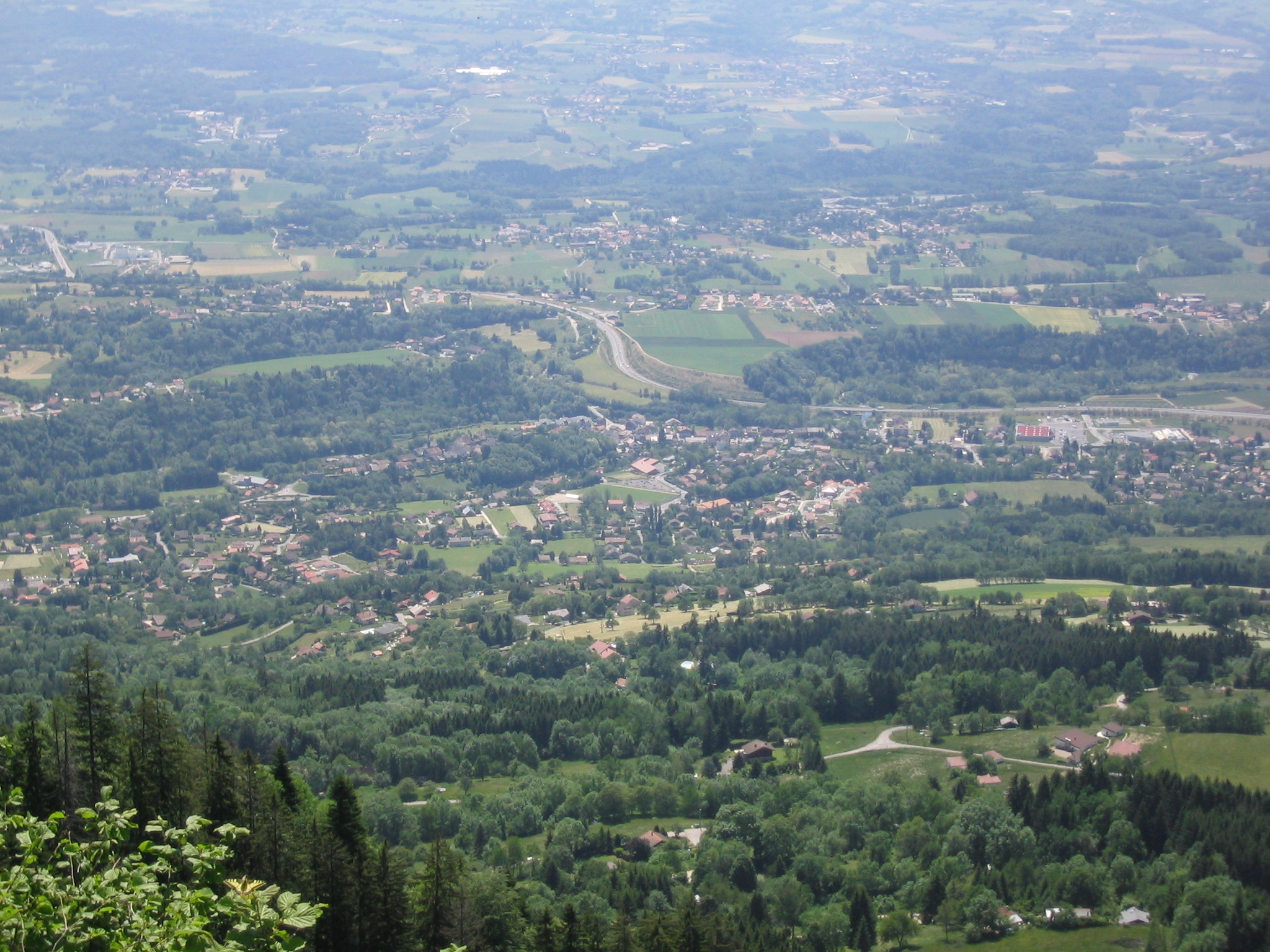
- An aerial view of Bonne

- Coat of arms
- Location of Bonne
- Location within France Location within Auvergne-Rhône-Alpes
- Coordinates: 46°10′10″N 6°19′17″E
- Country: France
- Region: Auvergne-Rhône-Alpes
- Department: Haute-Savoie
- Arrondissement: Saint-Julien-en-Genevois
- Canton: Gaillard
- Intercommunality: Annemasse - Les Voirons Agglomération

Government
  - Mayor (2020–2026): Yves Cheminal
- Area^{1}: 8.58 km^{2} (3.31 sq mi)
- Highest elevation: 1,303 m (4,275 ft)
- Lowest elevation: 459 m (1,506 ft)
- Population (2023): 3,267
  - Density: 381/km^{2} (986/sq mi)
- Time zone: UTC+01:00 (CET)
  - Summer (DST): UTC+02:00 (CEST)
- INSEE/Postal code: 74040 /74380
- ^{1} French Land Register data, which excludes lakes, ponds, glaciers > 1 km^{2} (0.386 sq mi or 247 acres) and river estuaries.

Bonne (French pronunciation: [bɔn]) is a commune in the Haute-Savoie department and Auvergne-Rhône-Alpes region of eastern France.

== Population ==
Historical population
Year	Pop.	±% p.a.
1968	1,016	—
1975	1,314	+3.74%
1982	1,598	+2.83%
1990	1,815	+1.60%
1999	2,098	+1.62%
2007	2,599	+2.71%
2012	3,038	+3.17%
2017	3,218	+1.16%
2023	3,267	+0.25%
Source: INSEE

== See also ==
- Communes of the Haute-Savoie department
