= Vétraz-Monthoux =

Vétraz-Monthoux Vtrâ (Savoyard)
- Commune
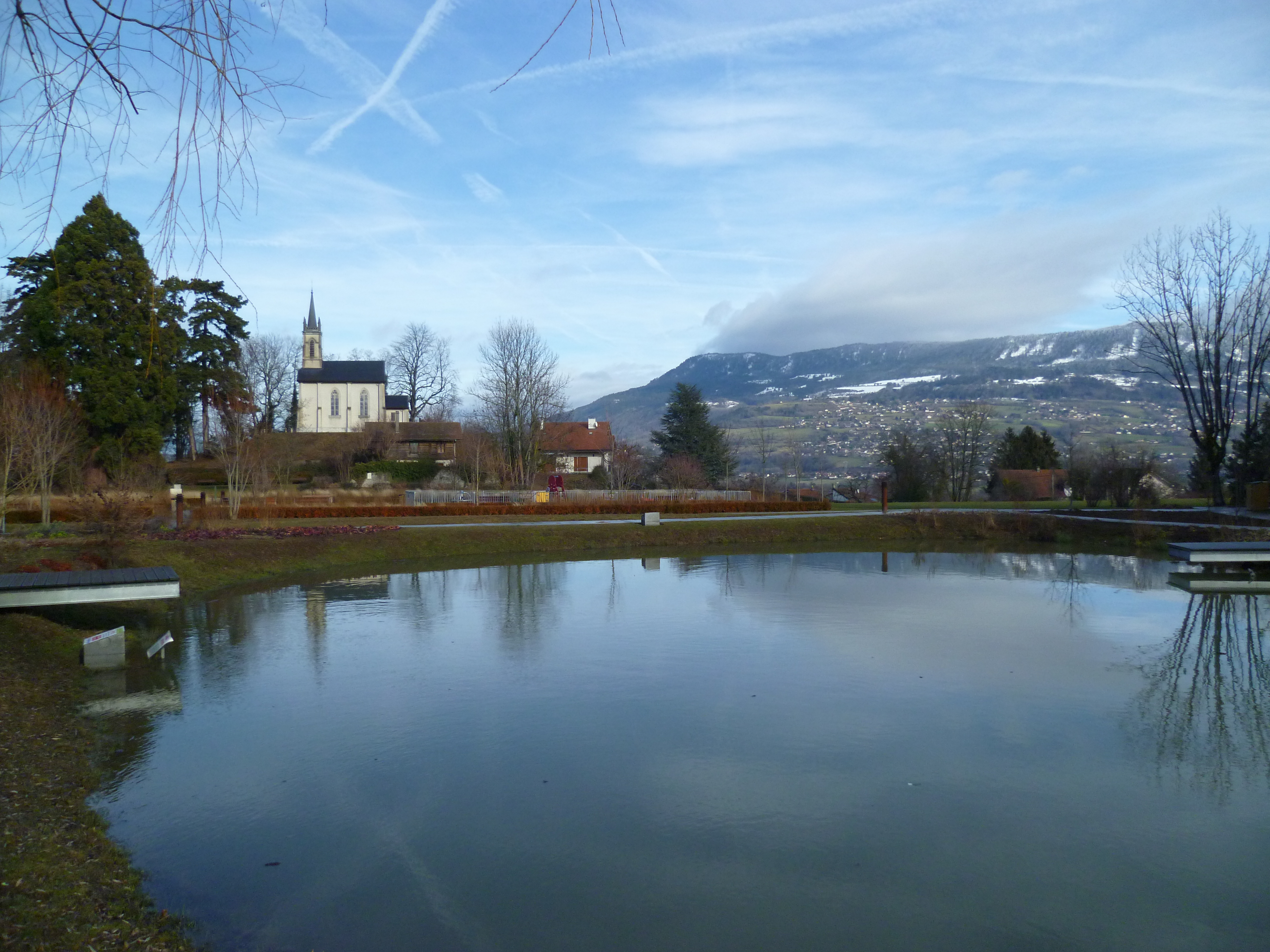
- A view across the lake in Vétraz-Montoux
- Location of Vétraz-Monthoux
- Location within France Location within Auvergne-Rhône-Alpes
- Coordinates: 46°10′27″N 6°15′29″E
- Country: France
- Region: Auvergne-Rhône-Alpes
- Department: Haute-Savoie
- Arrondissement: Saint-Julien-en-Genevois
- Canton: Gaillard
- Intercommunality: Annemasse - Les Voirons Agglomération

Government
  - Mayor (2020–2026): Patrick Antoine
- Area^{1}: 7.11 km^{2} (2.75 sq mi)
- Elevation: 470 m (1,540 ft)
- Highest elevation: 573 m (1,880 ft)
- Lowest elevation: 400 m (1,300 ft)
- Population (2023): 10,949
  - Density: 1,540/km^{2} (3,990/sq mi)
- Time zone: UTC+01:00 (CET)
  - Summer (DST): UTC+02:00 (CEST)
- INSEE/Postal code: 74298 /74100
- ^{1} French Land Register data, which excludes lakes, ponds, glaciers > 1 km^{2} (0.386 sq mi or 247 acres) and river estuaries.

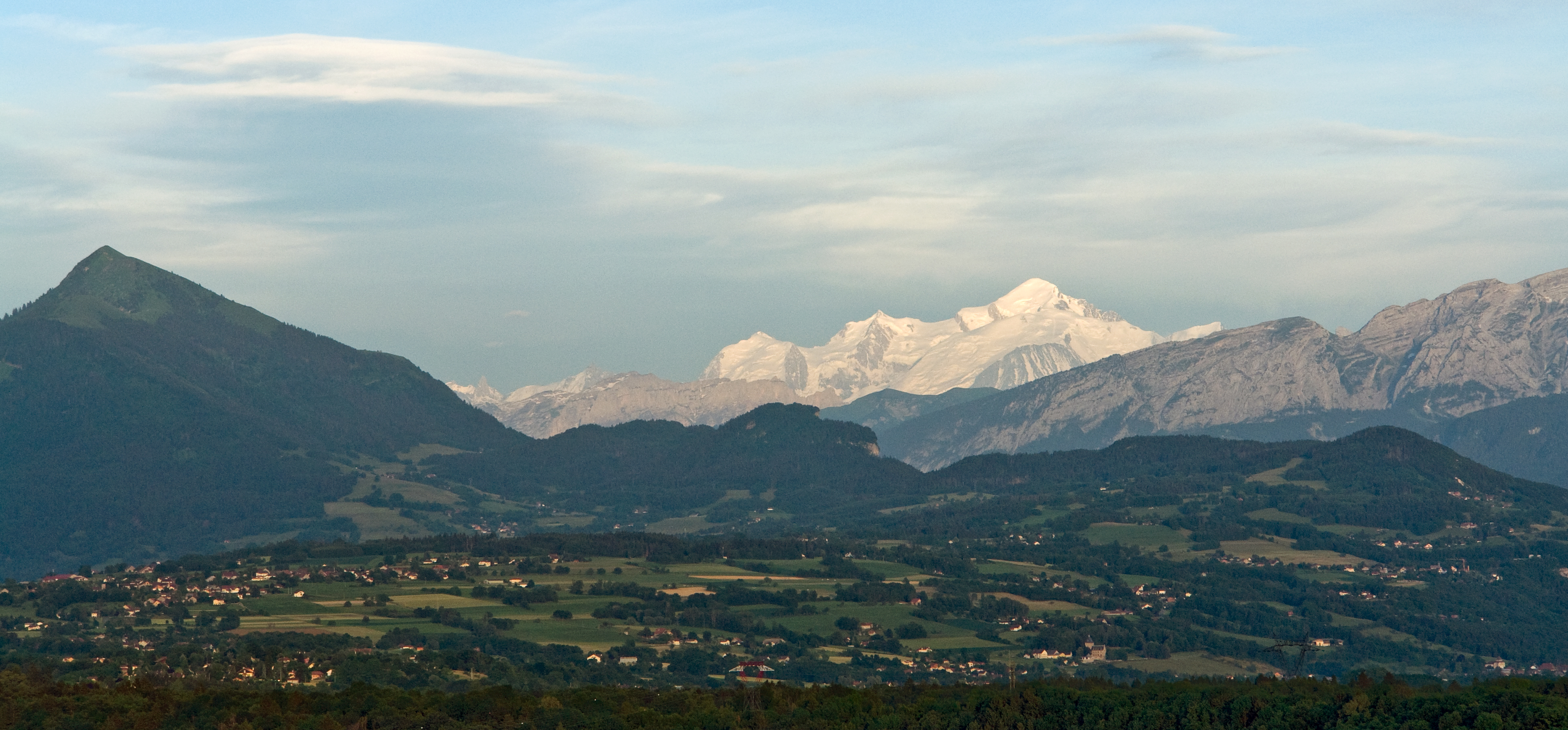
Mont Blanc from Vétraz-Monthoux

Vétraz-Monthoux (French pronunciation: [vetʁa mɔ̃tu]; Savoyard: Vtrâ) is a commune in the Haute-Savoie department in the Auvergne-Rhône-Alpes region in south-eastern France.

It is in the northern part of Haute-Savoie and right next to the Swiss border.

The poet Jean-Vincent Verdonnet (1923–2013) died in Vétraz-Monthoux.

== Population ==
Historical population
Year	Pop.	±% p.a.
1968	2,231	—
1975	2,908	+3.86%
1982	3,413	+2.31%
1990	4,311	+2.96%
1999	5,297	+2.31%
2007	6,262	+2.11%
2012	7,562	+3.84%
2017	8,900	+3.31%
2023	10,949	+3.51%
Source: INSEE

== See also ==
- Communes of the Haute-Savoie department
