= Arthaz-Pont-Notre-Dame =

Arthaz-Pont-Notre-Dame Artâ (Savoyard)
- Commune
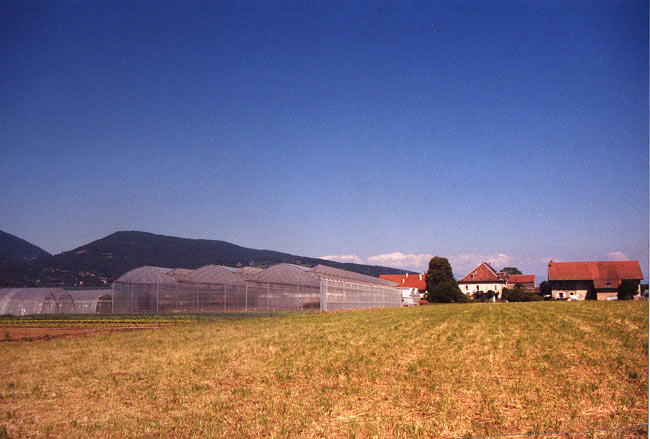
- A view within Arthaz

- Coat of arms
- Location of Arthaz-Pont-Notre-Dame
- Location within France Location within Auvergne-Rhône-Alpes
- Coordinates: 46°09′34″N 6°16′04″E
- Country: France
- Region: Auvergne-Rhône-Alpes
- Department: Haute-Savoie
- Arrondissement: Saint-Julien-en-Genevois
- Canton: Gaillard
- Intercommunality: CC Arve Salève

Government
  - Mayor (2020–2026): Régine Mayoraz
- Area^{1}: 5.96 km^{2} (2.30 sq mi)
- Highest elevation: 513 m (1,683 ft)
- Lowest elevation: 405 m (1,329 ft)
- Population (2023): 1,713
  - Density: 287/km^{2} (744/sq mi)
- Time zone: UTC+01:00 (CET)
  - Summer (DST): UTC+02:00 (CEST)
- INSEE/Postal code: 74021 /74380
- ^{1} French Land Register data, which excludes lakes, ponds, glaciers > 1 km^{2} (0.386 sq mi or 247 acres) and river estuaries.

Arthaz-Pont-Notre-Dame (French pronunciation: [aʁta pɔ̃ nɔtʁ dam]; Savoyard: Artâ) is a commune in the Haute-Savoie department in the Auvergne-Rhône-Alpes region in south-eastern France. It was formed by merging two small settlements in 1813.

== Population ==
Historical population
Year	Pop.	±% p.a.
1968	691	—
1975	850	+3.00%
1982	957	+1.71%
1990	1,139	+2.20%
1999	1,169	+0.29%
2007	1,257	+0.91%
2012	1,307	+0.78%
2017	1,577	+3.83%
2023	1,713	+1.39%
Source: INSEE

== See also ==
- Communes of the Haute-Savoie department
