= Habère-Lullin =

Habère-Lullin Âbèro d'Avâl (Savoyard)
- Commune
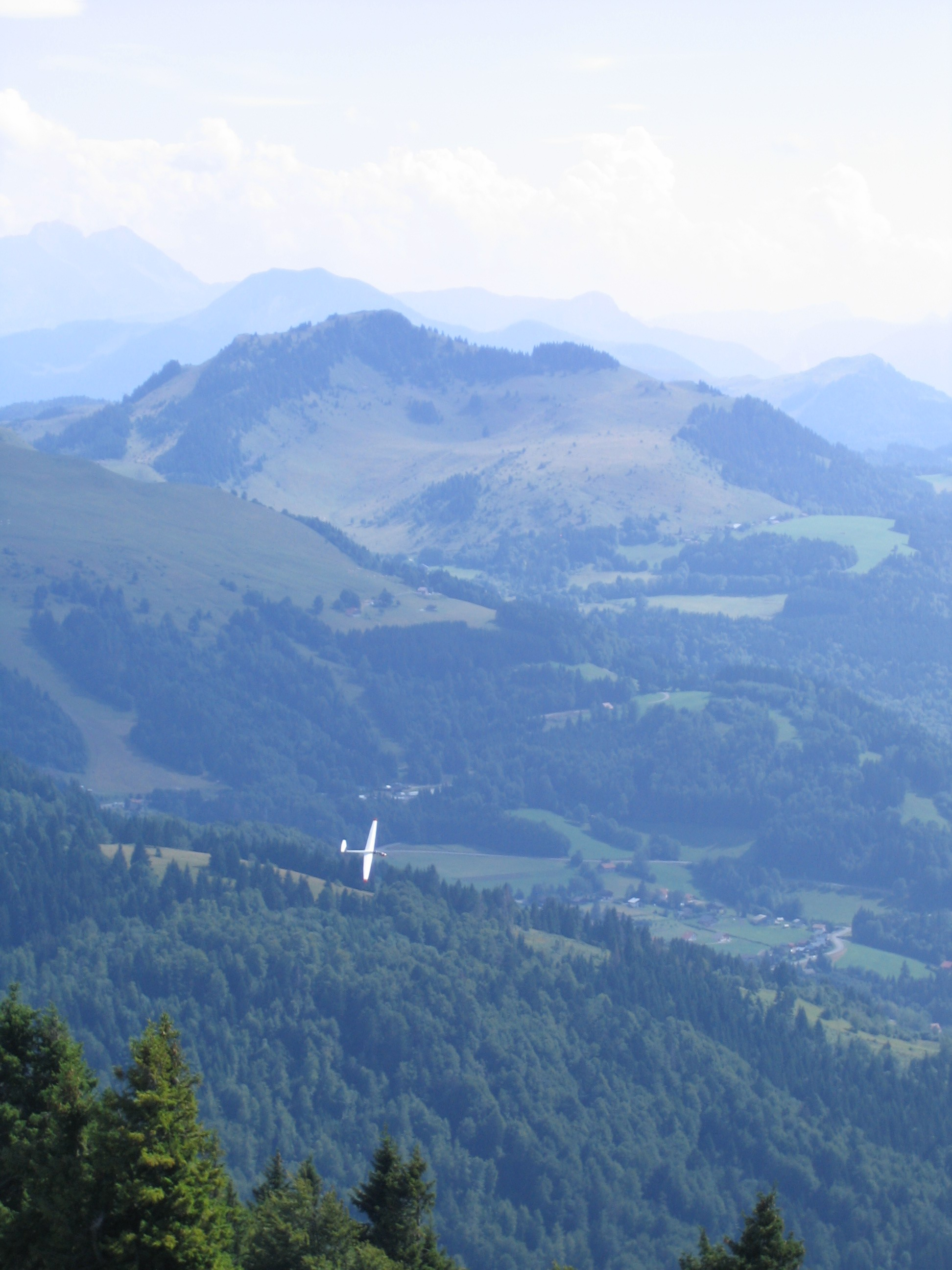
- The Pointe de Miribel, the highest point in Habère-Lullin, seen from Mont Forchat
- Location of Habère-Lullin
- Location within France Location within Auvergne-Rhône-Alpes
- Coordinates: 46°14′04″N 6°27′11″E
- Country: France
- Region: Auvergne-Rhône-Alpes
- Department: Haute-Savoie
- Arrondissement: Thonon-les-Bains
- Canton: Sciez
- Intercommunality: CC Vallée Verte

Government
  - Mayor (2020–2026): Laurent Desbiolles
- Area^{1}: 8.86 km^{2} (3.42 sq mi)
- Highest elevation: 1,597 m (5,240 ft)
- Lowest elevation: 790 m (2,590 ft)
- Population (2023): 1,122
  - Density: 127/km^{2} (328/sq mi)
- Time zone: UTC+01:00 (CET)
  - Summer (DST): UTC+02:00 (CEST)
- INSEE/Postal code: 74139 /74420
- ^{1} French Land Register data, which excludes lakes, ponds, glaciers > 1 km^{2} (0.386 sq mi or 247 acres) and river estuaries.

Habère-Lullin (French pronunciation: [abɛʁ lylɛ̃];Savoyard: Âbèro d'Avâl) is a commune in the Haute-Savoie department in the Auvergne-Rhône-Alpes region in south-eastern France. It lies on the river Menoge, in the Vallée Verte.

== Population ==
Historical population
Year	Pop.	±% p.a.
1968	374	—
1975	370	−0.15%
1982	395	+0.94%
1990	514	+3.35%
1999	634	+2.36%
2007	795	+2.87%
2012	883	+2.12%
2017	1,010	+2.72%
2023	1,122	+1.77%
Source: INSEE

== See also ==
- Communes of the Haute-Savoie department
