= Saint-Genis-Laval =

- Commune
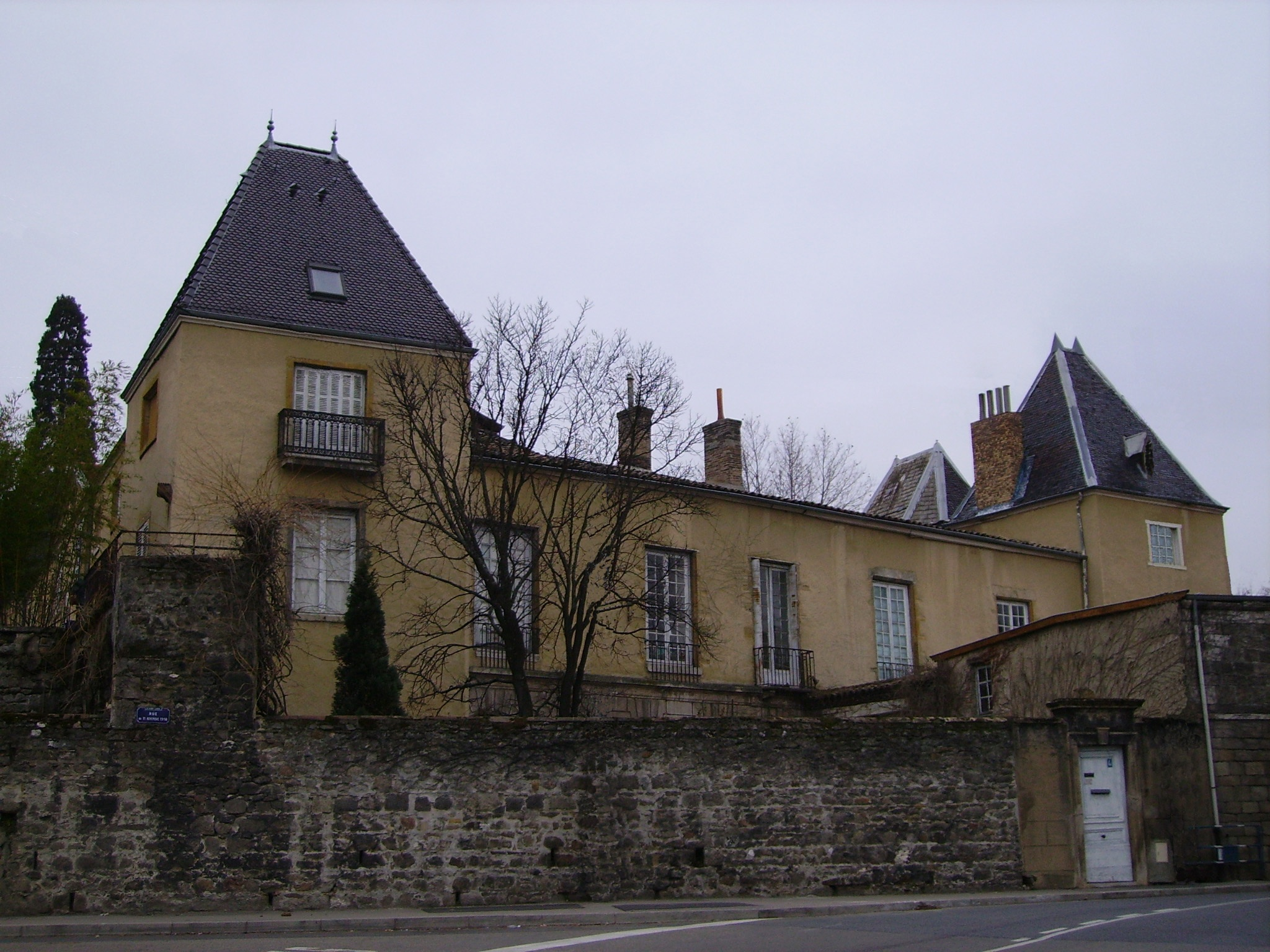
- The Château de La Tour

- Coat of arms
- Location of Saint-Genis-Laval
- Location within France Location within Auvergne-Rhône-Alpes
- Coordinates: 45°41′46″N 4°47′35″E
- Country: France
- Region: Auvergne-Rhône-Alpes
- Metropolis: Lyon Metropolis
- Arrondissement: Lyon

Government
  - Mayor (2020–2026): Marylène Millet
- Area^{1}: 12.92 km^{2} (4.99 sq mi)
- Elevation: 270 m (890 ft)
- Highest elevation: 307 m (1,007 ft)
- Lowest elevation: 169 m (554 ft)
- Population (2023): 21,212
  - Density: 1,642/km^{2} (4,252/sq mi)
- Time zone: UTC+01:00 (CET)
  - Summer (DST): UTC+02:00 (CEST)
- INSEE/Postal code: 69204 /69230
- ^{1} French Land Register data, which excludes lakes, ponds, glaciers > 1 km^{2} (0.386 sq mi or 247 acres) and river estuaries.

Saint-Genis-Laval (French pronunciation: [sɛ̃ ʒəni laval]) is a commune in the metropolis of Lyon in the Auvergne-Rhône-Alpes region of eastern France.

The Lyon Observatory is located in this commune.

== History ==
The Hôtel de Ville

Saint-Genis-Laval draws its name from Saint Genis or Genest, a Roman actor tortured under Diocletian. At the beginning of the 13th century, to differentiate it of other villages of the same name, the town added a qualitative to its name, «of the valley», which in the 15th century became "Laval".

The first mention of the settlement of Saint-Genis dates back to 807, a year the archbishop Leidrade donated to the hospitals of Saint-Roman and Saint-Genis. In 984 the parish of Saint-Genis was first mentioned as part of properties of the archbishop of Lyon, in the census of the 52 parishes of the metropolitan Church in Lyon. Little by little, the archbishop assigned his belongings to the Canons of the Lyon Cathedral. The canons would go on to build a castle on the highest part of the village, where the church now stands. In the 13th century they fortified the village, and in 1447 they rebuilt the surrounding wall. The current layout of the city center still features an ancient tower in the garden of the vicarage (for a long time a prison) between the edge of the medieval village and the remnants of the wall.

The canons of Saint-Jean held a fortified manor, in the territory of Laye, where Pope Clement V went to repose in 1306, after his coronation in the Church of Saint-Just à Lyon. Nothing remains of the manor. From the 13th century onward the pilgrimage to Notre-Dame-de-Beaunant attracted crowds: there remains a chapel there, rebuilt at the end of the previous century at the site of the miraculous spring. In November 1434, Saint-Genis was occupied by the Burgundians. The castle of Beauregard, the residence of Thomas de Gedagne, a Florentine banker, received King Charles IX of France and his court in 1564. Of the castle, only a few parts of the wall remain, but the gardens, terraces, and Nymphaeum still suggest an idea of the place's beauty. Today it is a municipal park.

The Hôtel de Ville is based in the former Couvent des Récollets (Convent of the Recollects) which was established in 1605.

During World War II, on 20 August 1944, the German security police committed the Saint-Genis-Laval massacre, killing some 120 French citizens, mostly resistance members.

== Population ==
Historical population

Year	Pop.	±% p.a.
1793	2,393	—
1800	2,114	−1.76%
1806	2,088	−0.21%
1821	1,895	−0.64%
1831	2,092	+0.99%
1836	2,031	−0.59%
1841	2,171	+1.34%
1846	2,525	+3.07%
1851	2,518	−0.06%
1856	2,580	+0.49%
1861	2,724	+1.09%
1866	2,817	+0.67%
1872	2,446	−2.33%
1876	2,942	+4.72%
1881	3,650	+4.41%
1886	3,702	+0.28%
1891	3,447	−1.42%
1896	3,435	−0.07%
1901	3,431	−0.02%

Year	Pop.	±% p.a.
1906	2,944	−3.02%
1911	3,195	+1.65%
1921	3,524	+0.98%
1926	3,931	+2.21%
1931	4,499	+2.74%
1936	4,602	+0.45%
1946	5,029	+0.89%
1954	5,914	+2.05%
1962	6,141	+0.47%
1968	7,128	+2.52%
1975	13,162	+9.16%
1982	14,353	+1.25%
1990	18,782	+3.42%
1999	19,221	+0.26%
2007	20,313	+0.69%
2012	20,632	+0.31%
2017	21,217	+0.56%
2023	21,212	−0.00%

Source: EHESS and INSEE (1968-2023)

== See also ==
- Communes of the Lyon Metropolis
- Joséphine Fodor (1793–1870), soprano, died in Saint-Genis-Laval
