= 2025–26 Biathlon IBU Cup =

Biathlon series

Discipline	Men	Women
Overall	(France) Gaëtan Paturel (1)	(France) Paula Botet (1)
U23	(France) Gaëtan Paturel (1)	(France) Voldiya Galmace Paulin (2)
Individual	(Germany) Elias Seidl (1)	(France) Voldiya Galmace Paulin (2)
Sprint	(France) Gaëtan Paturel (1)	(France) Paula Botet (3)
Pursuit	(France) Gaëtan Paturel (1)	(France) Paula Botet (1)
Mass start	(Norway) Martin Nevland (2)	(France) Amandine Mengin (1)
Relay	France	France
Nations Cup	France	France

Competition
Edition	18th	18th
Locations	7	7
Individual	23	23
Relay/Team	1	1
Mixed	8	8

The 2025–26 Biathlon IBU Cup, organised by the International Biathlon Union (IBU), was the 18th official IBU Cup season for men and women as the second level of international biathlon competitions.

The season started on 4 December 2025 in Obertilliach, Austria and was concluded on 7 March 2026 in Lake Placid, United States.

A major highlight of the season is the 2026 IBU Open European Championships held in Sjusjøen, Norway, which results also will count toward the IBU Cup rankings.

Isak Frey from Norway (men's) and Camille Bened from France (women's) were the reigning champions from the previous season.

French biathletes Gaëtan Paturel and Paula Botet became the new overall champions.

== Map of IBU Cup hosts ==
Europe	North America 2025–26 Biathlon IBU Cup (North America) European Championships

== Calendar ==
Stage	Location	Date	Individual / Short individual	Sprint	Pursuit	Mass start	Relay	Mixed relay	Single mixed relay	Details
1	(Austria) Obertilliach	4–7 December		●●	●					
2	(Italy) Ridnaun	11–14 December	●	●	●					
3	(Switzerland) Lenzerheide	17–20 December		●		●		●	●	
4	(Germany) Arber	8–11 January	●	●	●					
5	(Slovakia) Brezno-Osrblie	14–17 January		●		●		●	●	
ECH	(Norway) Sjusjøen	28 January–1 February	●	●	●		●			European Championships
6	(Norway) Sjusjøen	4–7 February		●	●			●	●	
7	(United States) Lake Placid	26 February–1 March	●	●	●					
8	(United States) Lake Placid	4–7 March		●		●		●	●	
Total: 72 (32 men's, 32 women's, 8 mixed)			4	10	6	3	1	4	4	

== Men ==
=== Calendar ===
Key: IND – Individual / SIND – Short Individual / SPR – Sprint / PUR – Pursuit / MSS – Mass Start
No.	Date	Place (In brackets Stage)	Discipline	Winner	Second	Third	R.
1	4 December 2025	(Austria) Obertilliach (1)	10 km SPR	(Norway) Johannes Dale-Skjevdal	(France) Oscar Lombardot	(Germany) David Zobel	
2	6 December 2025	(Austria) Obertilliach (1)	10 km SPR	(Norway) Johannes Dale-Skjevdal	(France) Valentin Lejeune	(France) Oscar Lombardot	
3	7 December 2025	(Austria) Obertilliach (1)	12.5 km PUR	(Norway) Johannes Dale-Skjevdal	(France) Valentin Lejeune	(France) Oscar Lombardot	
4	11 December 2025	(Italy) Ridnaun (2)	20 km IND	(Austria) Dominic Unterweger	(Norway) Kasper Kalkenberg	(Sweden) Henning Sjökvist	
5	13 December 2025	(Italy) Ridnaun (2)	10 km SPR	(France) Damien Levet	(France) Valentin Lejeune	(France) Antonin Guigonnat	
6	14 December 2025	(Italy) Ridnaun (2)	12.5 km PUR	(France) Antonin Guigonnat	(France) Valentin Lejeune	(France) Damien Levet	
7	19 December 2025	(Switzerland) Lenzerheide (3)	10 km SPR	(Norway) Sverre Dahlen Aspenes	(Norway) Vetle Paulsen	(Sweden) Philip Lindkvist-Flötten	
8	20 December 2025	(Switzerland) Lenzerheide (3)	15 km MSS 60	(Norway) Martin Nevland	(Norway) Sverre Dahlen Aspenes	(France) Gaëtan Paturel	
9	8 January 2026	(Germany) Arber (4)	15 km SIND	(Norway) Sivert Gerhardsen	(France) Émilien Claude	(Norway) Vetle Paulsen	
10	10 January 2026	(Germany) Arber (4)	10 km SPR	(Norway) Fredrik Vold	(France) Émilien Claude	(Norway) Sivert Gerhardsen	
11	11 January 2026	(Germany) Arber (4)	12.5 km PUR	(France) Antonin Guigonnat	(France) Gaëtan Paturel	(Norway) Kasper Kalkenberg	
12	16 January 2026	(Slovakia) Brezno-Osrblie (5)	10 km SPR	(Italy) Christoph Pircher	(Austria) Magnus Oberhauser	(Czech Republic) Petr Hák	
13	17 January 2026	(Slovakia) Brezno-Osrblie (5)	15 km MSS 60	(France) Antonin Guigonnat	(Norway) Martin Nevland	(Italy) Christoph Pircher	
2026 IBU Open European Championships (28 January–1 February)
14	28 January 2026	(Norway) Sjusjøen (ECH)	20 km IND	(France) Antonin Guigonnat	(Norway) Isak Leknes Frey	(France) Valentin Lejeune	
15	30 January 2026	(Norway) Sjusjøen (ECH)	10 km SPR	(France) Damien Levet	(Norway) Isak Leknes Frey	(France) Gaëtan Paturel	
16	31 January 2026	(Norway) Sjusjøen (ECH)	12.5 km PUR	(Norway) Isak Leknes Frey	(Germany) Leonhard Pfund	(Germany) Simon Kaiser	
17	6 February 2026	(Norway) Sjusjøen (6)	10 km SPR	(France) Gaëtan Paturel	(Germany) Franz Schaser	(Norway) Martin Nevland	
18	7 February 2025	(Norway) Sjusjøen (6)	12.5 km PUR	(Germany) Leonhard Pfund	(Germany) Simon Kaiser	(Germany) Roman Rees	
19	26 February 2026	(United States) Lake Placid (7), (8)	15 km SIND	(Germany) Elias Seidl	(Germany) Franz Schaser	(Germany) Roman Rees	
20	28 February 2026	(United States) Lake Placid (7), (8)	10 km SPR	(Norway) Sverre Dahlen Aspenes	(Germany) Danilo Riethmüller	(Norway) Ole Suhrke	
21	1 March 2026	(United States) Lake Placid (7), (8)	12.5 km PUR	(Germany) Danilo Riethmüller	(Norway) Ole Suhrke	(Norway) Sverre Dahlen Aspenes	
22	4 March 2026	(United States) Lake Placid (7), (8)	10 km SPR	(France) Gaëtan Paturel	(Norway) Ole Suhrke	(Norway) Sverre Dahlen Aspenes	
23	6 March 2026	(United States) Lake Placid (7), (8)	15 km MSS 60	(Norway) Sverre Dahlen Aspenes	(Norway) Martin Nevland	(France) Damien Levet	
17th IBU Cup Overall (4 December 2025 – 7 March 2026)				(France) Gaëtan Paturel	(France) Damien Levet	(France) Antonin Guigonnat	

=== Relay – 4 x 7.5 km ===
No.	Date	Place (In brackets Stage)	Winner	Second	Third	Leader (After competition)	R.
1	1 February 2026	(Norway) Sjusjøen (ECH)	Norway: 1. Sivert Gerhardsen; 2. Kasper Kalkenberg; 3. Martin Nevland; 4. Isak Leknes Frey	Germany: 1. Elias Seidl; 2. Simon Kaiser; 3. Danilo Riethmüller; 4. Leonhard Pfund	France: 1. Antonin Guigonnat; 2. Damien Levet; 3. Gaëtan Paturel; 4. Valentin Lejeune	France	

=== Overall leaders ===
Holder	Date	Place(s)	Number of competitions
Individual
(Norway) Johannes Dale-Skjevdal	4 December 2025 – 11 December 2025	(Austria) Obertilliach – (Italy) Ridnaun	4
(France) Valentin Lejeune	13 December 2025 – 20 December 2025	(Italy) Ridnaun – (Switzerland) Lenzerheide	4
(Norway) Vetle Paulsen	8 January 2026 – 28 January 2026	(Germany) Arber – (Norway) Sjusjøen	6
(France) Antonin Guigonnat	30 January 2026 – 31 January 2026	(Norway) Sjusjøen	2
(France) Damien Levet	6 February 2026	(Norway) Sjusjøen	1
(France) Gaëtan Paturel	7 February 2026 – 6 March 2026	(Norway) Sjusjøen – (United States) Lake Placid	6
Under 23
(Finland) Jimi Klemettinen	4 December 2025 – 6 December 2025	(Austria) Obertilliach	2
(Italy) Christoph Pircher	7 December 2025	(Austria) Obertilliach	1
(Norway) Kasper Kalkenberg	11 December 2025 – 11 January 2026	(Italy) Ridnaun – (Germany) Arber	8
(France) Gaëtan Paturel	16 January 2026 – 6 March 2026	(Slovakia) Brezno-Osrblie – (United States) Lake Placid	12

=== Standings ===
==== Overall ====
Rank	final standing after 23 events	Points
1	(France) Gaëtan Paturel	955
2	(France) Damien Levet	897
3	(France) Antonin Guigonnat	743
4	(France) Valentin Lejeune	645
5	(Norway) Vetle Paulsen	630
6	(Norway) Martin Nevland	608
7	(Germany) Roman Rees	596
8	(Germany) Leonhard Pfund	520
9	(Norway) Kasper Kalkenberg	517
10	(Germany) Elias Seidl	512

==== Under 23 ====
Rank	final standing after 23 events	Points
1	(France) Gaëtan Paturel	955
2	(Germany) Leonhard Pfund	520
3	(Norway) Kasper Kalkenberg	517
4	(Germany) Elias Siedl	512
5	(Italy) Christoph Pircher	444
6	(Finland) Arttu Heikkinen	352
7	(Norway) Sivert Gerhardsen	351
8	(Czech Republic) Petr Hák	249
9	(Norway) Isak Leknes Frey	240
10	(Norway) Fredrik Vold	214

==== Individual ====
Rank	final standing after 4 events	Points
1	(Germany) Elias Seidl	173
2	(Germany) Roman Rees	150
3	(Norway) Vetle Paulsen	147
4	(France) Antonin Guigonnat	135
5	(Norway) Sivert Gerhardsen	118

==== Sprint ====
Rank	final standing after 10 events	Points
1	(France) Gaëtan Paturel	489
2	(France) Damien Levet	445
3	(France) Valentin Lejeune	275
4	(Norway) Vetle Paulsen	259
5	(Norway) Martin Nevland	250

==== Pursuit ====
Rank	final standing after 6 events	Points
1	(France) Gaëtan Paturel	290
2	(France) Damien Levet	263
3	(France) Valentin Lejeune	226
4	(Norway) Kasper Kalkenberg	226
5	(France) Antonin Guigonnat	221

==== Mass start ====
Rank	final standing after 3 events	Points
1	(Norway) Martin Nevland	240
2	(France) Antonin Guigonnat	170
3	(Norway) Sverre Dahlen Aspenes	165
4	(France) Gaëtan Paturel	102
5	(Italy) Didier Bionaz	100

==== Relay ====
Rank	final standing after 9 events	Points
1	France	685
2	Germany	572
3	Austria	506
4	Sweden	495
5	Norway	481

==== Nations Cup ====
Rank	final standings after 23 events	Points
1	France	7764
2	Germany	7451
3	Norway	7391
4	Italy	6562
5	Sweden	6513

== Women ==
=== Calendar ===
Key: IND – Individual / SIND – Short Individual / SPR – Sprint / PUR – Pursuit / MSS – Mass Start
No.	Date	Place (In brackets Stage)	Discipline	Winner	Second	Third	R.
1	4 December 2025	(Austria) Obertilliach (1)	7.5 km SPR	(France) Paula Botet	(Moldova) Alina Stremous	(France) Voldiya Galmace Paulin	
2	6 December 2025	(Austria) Obertilliach (1)	7.5 km SPR	(Sweden) Anna-Karin Heijdenberg	(Norway) Åsne Skrede	(Italy) Rebecca Passler	
3	7 December 2025	(Austria) Obertilliach (1)	10 km PUR	(Sweden) Anna-Karin Heijdenberg	(Norway) Frida Dokken	(France) Paula Botet	
4	11 December 2025	(Italy) Ridnaun (2)	15 km IND	(France) Paula Botet	(France) Voldiya Galmace Paulin	(Austria) Lara Wagner	
5	13 December 2025	(Italy) Ridnaun (2)	7.5 km SPR	(France) Paula Botet	(France) Voldiya Galmace Paulin	(France) Célia Henaff	
6	14 December 2025	(Italy) Ridnaun (2)	10 km PUR	(France) Paula Botet	(France) Célia Henaff	(France) Voldiya Galmace Paulin	
7	19 December 2025	(Switzerland) Lenzerheide (3)	7.5 km SPR	(France) Sophie Chauveau	(France) Voldiya Galmace Paulin	(Italy) Michela Carrara	
8	20 December 2025	(Switzerland) Lenzerheide (3)	12.5 km MSS 60	(France) Voldiya Galmace Paulin	(France) Amandine Mengin	(France) Sophie Chauveau	
9	8 January 2026	(Germany) Arber (4)	12.5 km SIND	(France) Sophie Chauveau	(Sweden) Anna Hedström	(Sweden) Emma Nilsson	
10	10 January 2026	(Germany) Arber (4)	7.5 km SPR	(France) Paula Botet	(Germany) Sophia Schneider	(France) Amandine Mengin	
11	11 January 2026	(Germany) Arber (4)	10 km PUR	(Germany) Marlene Fichtner	(Germany) Sophia Schneider	(France) Amandine Mengin	
12	16 January 2026	(Slovakia) Brezno-Osrblie (5)	7.5 km SPR	(France) Paula Botet	(France) Gilonne Guigonnat	(Italy) Samuela Comola	
13	17 January 2026	(Slovakia) Brezno-Osrblie (5)	12.5 km MSS 60	(France) Célia Henaff	(France) Paula Botet	(France) Sophie Chauveau	
2026 IBU Open European Championships (28 January–1 February)
14	28 January 2026	(Norway) Sjusjøen (ECH)	15 km IND	(Ukraine) Anastasiya Merkushyna	(Italy) Samuela Comola	(France) Voldiya Galmace Paulin	
15	30 January 2026	(Norway) Sjusjøen (ECH)	7.5 km SPR	(France) Gilonne Guigonnat	(France) Célia Henaff	(France) Sophie Chauveau	
16	31 January 2026	(Norway) Sjusjøen (ECH)	10 km PUR	(France) Gilonne Guigonnat	(France) Célia Henaff	(France) Sophie Chauveau	
17	6 February 2026	(Norway) Sjusjøen (6)	7.5 km SPR	(Sweden) Sara Andersson	(France) Célia Henaff	(Norway) Ragna Fodstad	
18	7 February 2025	(Norway) Sjusjøen (6)	10 km PUR	(Austria) Lea Rothschopf	(Sweden) Emma Nilsson	(France) Sophie Chauveau	
19	26 February 2026	(United States) Lake Placid (7), (8)	12.5 km SIND	(Germany) Julia Kink	(Norway) Gro Randby	(Norway) Guro Ytterhus	
20	28 February 2026	(United States) Lake Placid (7), (8)	7.5 km SPR	(Norway) Gro Randby	(Sweden) Annie Lind	(Sweden) Sara Andersson	
21	1 March 2026	(United States) Lake Placid (7), (8)	10 km PUR	(Norway) Gro Randby	(Sweden) Sara Andersson	(Sweden) Johanna Skottheim	
22	4 March 2026	(United States) Lake Placid (7), (8)	7.5 km SPR	(France) Amandine Mengin	(Italy) Samuela Comola	(Norway) Gro Randby	
23	6 March 2026	(United States) Lake Placid (7), (8)	12.5 km MSS 60	(Austria) Lara Wagner	(France) Amandine Mengin	(Italy) Samuela Comola	
17th IBU Cup Overall (4 December 2025 – 7 March 2026)				(France) Paula Botet	(France) Voldiya Galmace Paulin	(France) Amandine Mengin	

=== Relay – 4 x 6 km ===
No.	Date	Place (In brackets Stage)	Winner	Second	Third	Leader (After competition)	R.
1	1 February 2026	(Norway) Sjusjøen (ECH)	France: 1. Célia Henaff; 2. Voldiya Galmace Paulin; 3. Sophie Chauveau; 4. Gilonne Guigonnat	Germany: 1. Mareike Braun; 2. Hanna Kebinger; 3. Julia Kink; 4. Marlene Fichtner	Norway: 1. Emilie Ågheim Kalkenberg; 2. Karoline Erdal; 3. Juni Arnekleiv; 4. Guro Ytterhus	France	

=== Overall leaders ===
Holder	Date	Place(s)	Number of competitions
Individual
(France) Paula Botet (1)	4 December 2025	(Austria) Obertilliach	1
(Sweden) Anna-Karin Heijdenberg	6 December 2025 – 7 December 2025	(Austria) Obertilliach	2
(France) Paula Botet (2)	11 December 2025 – 19 December 2025	(Italy) Ridnaun – (Switzerland) Lenzerheide	4
(France) Voldiya Galmace Paulin	20 December 2025 – 8 January 2026	(Switzerland) Lenzerheide – (Germany) Arber	2
(France) Paula Botet (3)	10 January 2026 – 6 March 2026	(Germany) Arber – (United States) Lake Placid	14
Under 23
(France) Voldiya Galmace Paulin (1)	4 December 2025	(Austria) Obertilliach	1
(Norway) Siri Skar	6 December 2025 – 7 December 2025	(Austria) Obertilliach	2
(France) Voldiya Galmace Paulin (2)	11 December 2025 – 6 March 2026	(Italy) Ridnaun – (United States) Lake Placid	20

=== Standings ===
==== Overall ====
Rank	final standing after 23 events	Points
1	(France) Paula Botet	1022
2	(France) Voldiya Galmace Paulin	953
3	(France) Amandine Mengin	910
4	(France) Sophie Chauveau	875
5	(France) Célia Henaff	844
6	(Sweden) Emma Nilsson	800
7	(France) Gilonne Guigonnat	723
8	(Germany) Julia Kink	602
9	(Norway) Karoline Erdal	589
10	(Italy) Samuela Comola	551

==== Under 23 ====
Rank	final standing after 23 events	Points
1	(France) Voldiya Galmace Paulin	953
2	(France) Amandine Mengin	910
3	(France) Célia Henaff	844
4	(Germany) Julia Kink	602
5	(Germany) Marlene Fichtner	408
6	(Sweden) Sara Andersson	350
7	(Norway) Guro Ytterhus	306
8	(Norway) Siri Skar	299
9	(Czech Republic) Kateřina Pavlů	225
10	(Italy) Fabiana Carpella	203

==== Individual ====
Rank	final standing after 4 events	Points
1	(France) Voldiya Galmace Paulin	196
2	(Sweden) Emma Nilsson	195
3	(Sweden) Anna Hedström	163
4	(Germany) Julia Kink	159
5	(France) Paula Botet	151

==== Sprint ====
Rank	final standing after 10 events	Points
1	(France) Paula Botet	486
2	(France) Sophie Chauveau	401
3	(France) Voldiya Galmace Paulin	381
4	(France) Célia Henaff	376
5	(France) Gilonne Guigonnat	326

==== Pursuit ====
Rank	final standing after 6 events	Points
1	(France) Paula Botet	310
2	(Sweden) Emma Nilsson	280
3	(France) Célia Henaff	236
4	(France) Sophie Chauveau	234
5	(France) Amandine Mengin	209

==== Mass start ====
Rank	final standing after 3 events	Points
1	(France) Amandine Mengin	205
2	(France) Voldiya Galmace Paulin	177
3	(France) Sophie Chauveau	130
4	(France) Célia Henaff	127
5	(France) Gilonne Guigonnat	125

==== Relay ====
Rank	final standings after 9 events	Points
1	France	710
2	Germany	572
3	Austria	502
4	Sweden	500
5	Norway	456

==== Nations Cup ====
Rank	final standings after 23 events	Points
1	France	8052
2	Germany	7176
3	Sweden	7150
4	Norway	6938
5	Italy	6755

== Mixed Relay ==
No.	Date	Place (In brackets Stage)	Winner	Second	Third	R.
Mixed Relay – 4 x 6 km
1	17 December 2025	(Switzerland) Lenzerheide (3)	France: 1. Émilien Claude; 2. Damien Levet; 3. Voldiya Galmace Paulin; 4. Célia Henaff	Italy: 1. Nicola Romanin; 2. Didier Bionaz; 3. Martina Trabucchi; 4. Michela Carrara	Germany: 1. Roman Rees; 2. Lucas Fratzscher; 3. Sophia Schneider; 4. Hanna Kebinger	
3	14 January 2026	(Slovakia) Brezno-Osrblie (5)	Germany: 1. Sophie Patz; 2. Lisa Maria Spark; 3. Elias Seidl; 4. Franz Schaser	France: 1. Voldiya Galmace Paulin; 2. Sophie Chauveau; 3. Gaëtan Paturel; 4. Damien Levet	Sweden: 1. Emma Nilsson; 2. Anna Hedström; 3. Emil Nykvist; 4. Philip Lindkvist-Flötten	
5	4 February 2026	(Norway) Sjusjøen (6)	France: 1. Davien Levet; 2. Gaëtan Paturel; 3. Voldiya Galmace Paulin; 4. Jeanne Richard	Austria: 1. Fredrik Mühlbacher; 2. Magnus Oberhauser; 3. Lisa Osl; 4. Lea Rothschopf	Germany: 1. Roman Rees; 2. Simon Kaiser; 3. Hanna Kebinger; 4. Mareike Braun	
7	7 March 2026	(United States) Lake Placid (8)	France: 1. Gilonne Guigonnat; 2. Voldiya Galmace Paulin; 3. Gaëtan Paturel; 4. Damien Levet	Norway: 1. Guro Ytterhus; 2. Gro Randby; 3. Ole Suhrke; 4. Sverre Dahlen Aspenes	Germany: 1. Marina Sauter; 2. Julia Kink; 3. Simon Kaiser; 4. Danilo Riethmüller	
Single Mixed Relay – 6 km + 7.5 km
2	17 December 2025	(Switzerland) Lenzerheide (3)	France: 1. Antonin Guigonnat; 2. Gilonne Guigonnat	Finland: 1. Jaakko Ranta; 2. Erika Jänkä	Austria: 1. Lukas Haslinger; 2. Tamara Steiner	
4	14 January 2026	(Slovakia) Brezno-Osrblie (5)	Sweden: 1. Annie Lind; 2. Melker Nordgren	Finland: 1. Erika Jänkä; 2. Jaanko Ranta	Italy: 1. Linda Zingerle; 2. Daniele Cappellari	
6	4 February 2026	(Norway) Sjusjøen (6)	France: 1. Theo Guiraud Poillot; 2. Amandine Mengin	Austria: 1. Lukas Haslinger; 2. Dunja Zdouc	Sweden: 1. Oscar Andersson; 2. Sara Andersson	
8	7 March 2026	(United States) Lake Placid (8)	Norway: 1. Karoline Erdal; 2. Martin Nevland	Austria: 1. Dunja Zdouc; 2. David Komatz	Germany: 1. Hanna Kebinger; 2. Franz Schaser	

== Podium table by nation ==
Table showing the IBU Cup podium places (gold–1st place, silver–2nd place, bronze–3rd place) by the countries represented by the athletes.

After Men's Mass Start in Lake Placid (6 March 2026)

Rank	Nation	Gold	Silver	Bronze	Total
1	France	27	20	21	68
2	Norway	14	13	11	38
3	Germany	6	9	8	23
4	Sweden	4	4	7	15
5	Austria	3	4	2	9
6	Italy	1	3	6	10
7	Ukraine	1	0	0	1
8	Finland	0	2	0	2
9	Moldova	0	1	0	1
10	Czech Republic	0	0	1	1
Totals (10 entries)		56	56	56	168

== Points distribution ==
The table shows the number of points won in the 2025–26 Biathlon IBU Cup for men and women.

Place	1	2	3	4	5	6	7	8	9	10	11	12	13	14	15	16	17	18	19	20	21	22	23	24	25	26	27	28	29	30	31	32	33	34	35	36	37	38	39	40
Individual	90	75	65	55	50	45	41	37	34	31	30	29	28	27	26	25	24	23	22	21	20	19	18	17	16	15	14	13	12	11	10	9	8	7	6	5	4	3	2	1
Sprint	90	75	65	55	50	45	41	37	34	31	30	29	28	27	26	25	24	23	22	21	20	19	18	17	16	15	14	13	12	11	10	9	8	7	6	5	4	3	2	1
Pursuit	90	75	65	55	50	45	41	37	34	31	30	29	28	27	26	25	24	23	22	21	20	19	18	17	16	15	14	13	12	11	10	9	8	7	6	5	4	3	2	1
Mass Start	90	75	65	55	50	45	41	37	34	31	30	29	28	27	26	25	24	23	22	21	20	19	18	17	16	15	14	13	12	11	10	9	8	7	6	5	4	3	2	1

== Retirements ==
The following notable biathletes, who competed in the IBU Cup and never participated in the World Cup, are expected to retire during or after the 2025–26 season:

Men

- (Canada) Daniel Gilfillan
- (France) Mathieu Garcia
- (Norway) Martin Femsteinevik
- (Sweden) Oskar Ohlsson
- (Norway) Vetle Paulsen

Women

- (Slovenia) Kaja Marič

== See also ==
- 2025–26 Biathlon World Cup (as the highest competition series of IBU)
- 2026 Winter Olympics
- 2026 IBU Open European Championships
- 2026 IBU Junior World Championships
- 2026 IBU Junior Open European Championships
