= List of roads in Haute-Savoie named after women =

This list shows the roads in Haute-Savoie named after a woman, order by city or agglomeration.

== Annecy ==
The city of Annecy has 20 roads named after a woman among 355 roads

Streets named after a woman in Annecy agglomeration
Street	Person	Municipality	Coordinates	Remarks
Rue Lucie Aubrac	Lucie Aubrac	Annecy	45°55′10.22″N 6°7′20.99″E	
Rue Jacqueline Auriol	Jacqueline Auriol	Annecy	45°55′28.26″N 6°7′44.2″E	
Place Marie Curie	Marie Curie	Annecy	45°54′11.02″N 6°7′22.23″E	
Rue Sainte Bernadette	Bernadette Soubirous	Annecy	45°54′25.49″N 6°8′32.59″E	
Chemin de Sainte Catherine	Catherine of Alexandria ?	Annecy	45°52′2.09″N 6°6′52.87″E	
Rue Sainte Claire	Clare of Assisi	Annecy	45°53′54.22″N 6°7′28.36″E	
Faubourg Sainte Claire	Clare of Assisi	Annecy	45°53′51.32″N 6°7′23.82″E	
Place Sainte Claire	Clare of Assisi	Annecy	?	
Promenade Sainte-Thérèse du Québec	Marie-Thérèse Dugué de Boisbriand	Annecy	45°53′57.64″N 6°6′46.96″E	
Chemin de Sainte-Anne	Saint Anne ?	Annecy-le-Vieux	45°55′10.59″N 6°8′47.43″E	
rue Maryse Bastié	Maryse Bastié	Seynod	45°53′31.92″N 6°5′36.66″E	
impasse Hélène Boucher	Hélène Boucher	Seynod	45°53′30.35″N 6°5′30.35″E	
impasse Sainte-Catherine	Catherine of Alexandria ?	Seynod	45°53′39.63″N 6°6′57.79″E	
Allée Olympe de Gouges	Olympe de Gouges	Annecy	45°55′8.48″N 6°7′18.78″E	
rue George Sand	George Sand	Seynod	45°53′3.67″N 6°6′19.48″E	
rue Joliot-Curie	Frédéric Joliot-Curie et Irène Joliot-Curie	Meythet	45°54′39.9″N 6°5′35″E	
Square Louise Michel	Louise Michel	Annecy	45°55′19.53″N 6°7′23.15″E	
Allée Berthe Morisot	Berthe Morisot	Annecy	45°55′17.75″N 6°7′24.15″E	
Allée Marie Paradis	Marie Paradis	Annecy	45°55′7.09″N 6°7′21.97″E	
Allée Charlotte Perriand	Charlotte Perriand	Annecy	45°55′12.19″N 6°7′20.83″E	
Allée Catherine Sauvage	Catherine Sauvage	Annecy	45°55′14.88″N 6°7′24.23″E	
Allée Louise de Savoie	Louise de Savoie	Annecy	45°55′5.08″N 6°7′22.65″E	
Square Madame de Sévigné	Madame de Sévigné	Annecy	45°55′2.53″N 6°7′19.75″E	
impasse Élisabeth de Vendôme	Élisabeth de Vendôme	Meythet	45°55′20.21″N 6°5′50.82″E	
rue Cécile Vogt-Mugnier	Cécile Vogt-Mugnier	Annecy	45°54′26.3″N 6°7′19.9″E	
Impasse Mahault de Boulogne	Matilda of Boulogne	Annecy	45°55′4.45″N 6°7′30.52″E	
Rue Mahault de Boulogne	Matilda of Boulogne	Annecy	45°55′3.92″N 6°7′27.75″E	
Quai Madame de Warens	Françoise-Louise de Warens	Annecy	45°53′58.28″N 6°7′27.36″E	

In addition, Annecy has a high school named after Geneviève de Gaulle-Anthonioz and Meythet has library named after Louise Michel.

== Annemasse ==
Streets named after a woman in Annemasse agglomeration
Street	Person	Municipality	Coordinates	Remarks
Avenue Lucie Aubrac	Lucie Aubrac	Annemasse	46°11′21.37″N 6°14′47.01″E	
rue Maryse Bastié	Maryse Bastié	Gaillard	46°11′22.03″N 6°12′57.13″E	
rue Hélène Boucher	Hélène Boucher	Ville-la-Grand	46°12′11.78″N 6°16′20.75″E	
rue Marie Curie	Marie Curie	Annemasse	46°11′30.72″N 6°15′11.27″E	
rue Joliot-Curie	Frédéric Joliot-Curie et Irène Joliot-Curie	Ville-la-Grand	46°11′58.8″N 6°15′8.3″E	
rue Marianne Cohn	Marianne Cohn	Ville-la-Grand	46°12′19.62″N 6°15′43.67″E	
rue Marthe Louise Perrin	Marthe Louise Perrin	Ville-la-Grand	46°12′22.88″N 6°15′41.01″E	

== Archamps ==
Street	Person	Municipality	Coordinates	Remarks
Rue Ada Byron	Ada Lovelace	Archamps	46°8′10.91″N 6°7′19.07″E	
Avenue Marie Curie	Marie Curie	Archamps	46°8′24.78″N 6°7′16.04″E	

== Bonneville ==
Street	Person	Municipality	Coordinates	Remarks
Rue Sainte Catherine	Catherine of Alexandria ?	Bonneville	46°4′41.86″N 6°24′34.6″E	
Avenue Beatrix de Faucigny	Beatrice of Savoy	Bonneville	46°4′46.5″N 6°23′52.3″E	

== Sallanches ==
Street	Person	Municipality	Coordinates	Remarks
Rue Jeanne d'Arc	Jeanne d'Arc	Sallanches	45°56′10.12″N 6°38′9.37″E	

== Thônes ==
Street	Person	Municipality	Coordinates	Remarks
Rue Marguerite Frichelet	Marguerite Frichelet-Avet	Thônes	45°53′6.22″N 6°19′32.54″E	
