= 2026 IBU Junior Open European Championships =

Biathlon competition in Imatra, Finland

- Host city: Imatra, Finland
- Dates: 21–25 January
- Participation: 200 athletes from 24 nations
- Events: 8

The 11th IBU Junior Open European Championships in biathlon took place from 21 to 25 January 2026 in Imatra, Finland.

The Czech and Latvian teams won the most medals.

The Czech team earned 3 gold and 1 bronze, while the Latvian team earned 1 gold and 3 bronze. The most decorated athletes of the championship were Latvia's Estere Volfa, Sweden's Greta Lindqvist Seldahl and Czech Republic's David Eliáš, who each won one individual gold and one individual bronze. Volfa and Lindqvist Seldahl also won one relay medal.

== Schedule ==
All times are local (UTC+2).

Date	Time	Event
21 January	10:30	Women's 12.5 km individual
21 January	14:15	Men's 15 km individual
22 January	10:30	Mixed Relay
22 January	14:00	Single Mixed Relay
24 January	11:40	Women's 7.5 km sprint
24 January	14:10	Men's 10 km sprint
25 January	11:00	Women's 9 km mass start 60
25 January	13:15	Men's 12 km mass start 60

== Medal summary ==
=== Medal table ===
* Host nation (Finland)

Rank	Nation	Gold	Silver	Bronze	Total
1	Czech Republic	3	0	1	4
2	Sweden	2	0	1	3
3	Ukraine	1	1	1	3
4	Slovenia	1	1	0	2
5	Latvia	1	0	3	4
6	Austria	0	3	0	3
7	Slovakia	0	2	1	3
8	Switzerland	0	1	0	1
9	Poland	0	0	1	1
Totals (9 entries)		8	8	8	24

=== Men ===
Event	Gold		Silver		Bronze	
15 km individual details	David Eliáš; Czech Republic	42:17.3 (1+1+0+0)	Matti Pinter; Austria	42:43.4 (1+0+0+0)	Rihards Lozbers; Latvia	42:55.5 (1+1+0+1)
10 km sprint details	Vladimír Kocmánek; Czech Republic	25:14.3 (0+0)	Martin Maťko; Slovakia	25:26.5 (0+1)	David Eliáš; Czech Republic	25:53.4 (1+1)
12 km mass start 60 details	Michael Málek; Czech Republic	32:13.2 (0+0+0+0)	Thomas Marchl; Austria	+13.4 (0+0+1+0)	Jakub Potoniec; Poland	+14.1 (1+0+0+0)

=== Women ===
Event	Gold		Silver		Bronze	
12.5 km individual details	Greta Lindqvist Seldahl; Sweden	41:31.2 (0+0+0+0)	Tamara Molentová; Slovakia	41:40.2 (0+2+0+0)	Michaela Straková; Slovakia	42:07.5 (1+0+0+1)
7.5 km sprint details	Manca Caserman; Slovenia	22:44.8 (1+0)	Anna Millinger; Austria	23:15.8 (0+1)	Estere Volfa; Latvia	23:21.7 (0+3)
9 km mass start 60 details	Estere Volfa; Latvia	27:00.6 (0+1+0+0)	Tetiana Tarasiuk; Ukraine	+3.1 (0+0+0+0)	Greta Lindqvist Seldahl; Sweden	+1:12.4 (0+1+1+0)

=== Mixed ===
Event	Gold		Silver		Bronze	
4 × 6 km M+W relay details	Sweden Lydia Hägg Eveby; Greta Lindqvist Seldahl; Isak Falk; Elmer Nordlander	1:07:40.3 (0+0) (0+1) (0+0) (0+2) (0+1) (0+1) (0+1) (0+0)	Slovenia Ela Sever; Manca Caserman; Ruj Grošelj Simić; Aljaž Omejc	1:07:50.5 (0+3) (0+2) (0+1) (0+1) (0+1) (0+0) (0+1) (1+3)	Ukraine Kseniia Prykhodko; Viktoriia Khvostenko; Ivan Steblyna; Oleksandr Bilanenko	1:07:56.9 (0+2) (0+1) (0+0) (0+3) (0+1) (0+2) (0+1) (0+1)
6 km M + 7.5 km W single relay details	Ukraine Tetiana Tarasiuk; Taras Tarasiuk	37:29.1 (0+1) (0+3) (0+0) (0+1) (0+0) (0+0) (0+0) (0+0)	Switzerland Lena Baumann; Remo Burch	37:32.4 (0+1) (0+0) (0+1) (0+2) (0+2) (0+2) (0+1) (0+0)	Latvia Estere Volfa; Rihards Lozbers	37:47.0 (0+0) (0+1) (0+2) (0+2) (0+1) (0+1) (1+3) (0+1)

== See also ==
- 2025–26 Biathlon World Cup
- 2025–26 Biathlon IBU Cup
- 2026 Winter Olympics
- 2026 IBU Open European Championships
