= Cret =

Cret may refer to:

- Crêt, a village in Haute-Savoie, France
- Čret, Slovenia, also known as Gornji Lenart, a village near Brežice
- Čret, Croatia, a village near Krapinske Toplice
- Cret Bizovački, a village near Bizovac, Croatia
- Paul Philippe Cret (1876–1945), French-born Philadelphia architect and industrial designer
- Alex Creț (born 2002), Romanian judoka
