= Renee Bornstein =

French-born Holocaust survivor (1934–2024)

Renee Bornstein BEM
- Born: Renee Koenig; 10 February 1934; Strasbourg, France
- Died: 28 November 2024 (aged 90)

Renee Bornstein, BEM (née Koenig; 10 February 1934 – 28 November 2024) was a French-born Holocaust survivor, who lived in Manchester, England. She was the wife of Ernst Israel Bornstein, a Polish-born Holocaust survivor and author of Die Lange Nacht, a memoir of his experiences during WWII, published in English as The Long Night.

== Personal life ==
Bornstein was born Renee Koenig to Samuel and Frieda in Strasbourg, France, on 10 February 1934. She has an older sister Helen and younger brother, Joe. At age 5 the family was relocated to St Junien in the south-west of France. Bornstein was Jewish and a survivor of the Holocaust. In 1964, she married Dr Ernst Israel Bornstein, a doctor and a dentist, who she met through mutual friends when he was 42 and she was 30. They lived in Munich, Germany and had three children: Noemie, Muriel and Alain. Ernst died in 1978, at the age of 55, due to a heart condition attributed to the years of starvation and forced labour during his teenage years in Nazi labour and concentration camps.

Bornstein later moved to Manchester, England with her children. She died from pancreatic cancer on 28 November 2024, at the age of 90.

== The Holocaust ==
In 1942, the Germans invaded France and would search villages looking for Jews to deport to concentration camps and death camps. Bornstein and her family would rush to hide in barns, farms, convents and the cellars of churches to avoid being captured. As the Nazis tightened their grip on occupied France, Bornstein's parents decided to send their three children to Switzerland, giving them false names and papers so that they could join non-Jewish children at a holiday camp ostensibly to escape the bombing (although most of the children were actually Jews fleeing the Nazis). Bornstein was given the name Renee Blanche. Bornstein was aged 10 and her siblings Helen and Joe were 13 and 9. They hid in a Catholic convent in France for two weeks. Bornstein recalls the nuns telling her that she will die, hence she should be baptised by them so that she can go to heaven.

In 1944, Bornstein's group of 32 children, aged 2 to 16, were helped by a Jewish Girl Guide and French Resistance fighter Marianne Cohn, who took them across the border from Annecy in France to Switzerland. The group missed the train in Annecy and transport with a lorry was arranged. On the way, close to Le Pas De L’Echelle, a French village near Geneva, the lorry was stopped. Bornstein, her siblings and the other children, together with Cohn were arrested by the Gestapo with barking dogs and guns. The driver, Joseph Fournier, was taken away and beaten up by the Gestapo.

The children and Marianne were imprisoned in the Prison du Pax in Annemasse, on the border between France and Switzerland. She was interrogated daily at gunpoint by Gestapo Chief Myer together with her siblings. She also witnessed a young Jewish boy, Leon Sonnstein, aged 11 being beaten. The Mayor of Annemasse Jean Deffaugt provided food for the children and visited almost daily passing messages back and forth for Cohn. After a few days in prison, Marianne Cohn was taken away for slave labour and questioning and returned every evening with a beaten face. She was subjected to torture, hot and cold baths and was eventually raped and murdered by the Gestapo in July 1944.

== Liberation ==
In August 1944, after two weeks of being in prison, the Mayor of Annemasse negotiated freedom for the children with the Gestapo. The children stayed in Bonne-sur-Menoge for around two weeks and were told that the Mayor would be shot if they attempted to run away. Members of the underground movement the Maquis took the children to a Red Cross refugee centre at the Carlton Hotel in Geneva where they remained for three months.

In total, Bornstein was separated from her parents for 6 months. Her parents survived WWII by constantly hiding. The family was reunited in late 1944.

== Post-Holocaust ==
In 1964, she married Dr Ernst Israel Bornstein, a Polish holocaust survivor who practised as a doctor and a dentist and the couple lived in Munich and had three children. In 1978, at the age of 55, Ernst died suddenly of a heart condition. When Ernst died, the family relocated to Manchester, England and continued to live there.

Ernst started writing his memoirs after discovering that many of his patients knew nothing about the Holocaust only a generation after it happened and others thought it had been exaggerated and falsified. In 1967, he published 'Die Lange Nacht' which details his experiences of WWII in Nazi labour camps. Bornstein's daughter Noemie translated Die Lange Nacht into English (The Long Night) and the book was published in 2015.

The book included a prefaced letter by David Cameron and has been endorsed by Lord Finkelstein, Rabbi Lord Jonathan Sacks, Jonathan Dimbleby and Dan Snow. A new German edition was published in 2020 with a foreword by Charlotte Knobloch, before being translated into other languages.

== Legacy ==
In May 2019, Bornstein and two other Holocaust survivors were invited back to the town of Annemasse, and a ceremony was held in the town centre in their honour, unveiling a plaque with their names.

BBC One screened Bornstein's story as part of 'Me, My Family and The Holocaust' in November 2020.

In 2021, she was awarded the British Empire Medal (BEM) for services to Holocaust education and commemoration.
