= Hôtel de Ville, Annemasse =

Town hall in Annemasse, France

Hôtel de Ville
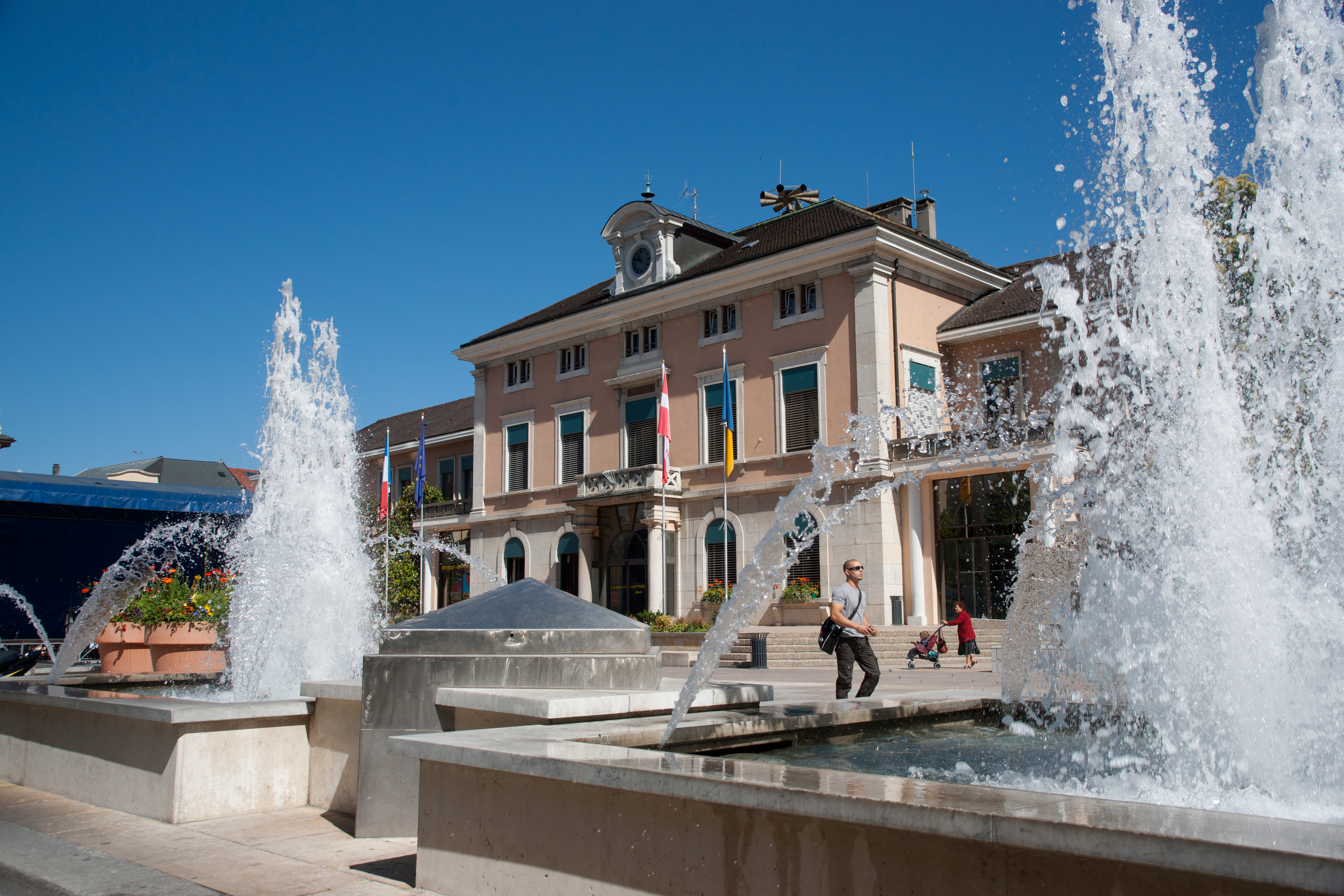
- The main frontage of the Hôtel de Ville in May 2011
- Interactive map of the Hôtel de Ville area

General information
- Type: City hall
- Architectural style: Neoclassical style
- Location: Annemasse, France
- Coordinates: 46.1933°N 6.2341°E
- Completed: 1885

Design and construction
- Architect: Émile Reverdin

The Hôtel de Ville (French pronunciation: [otɛl də vil], City Hall) is a municipal building in Annemasse, Haute-Savoie, eastern France, standing on Place de l'Hôtel de Ville.

== History ==
The old town hall in Annemasse was primarily the place where passports, which had been surrendered at the Swiss border, could be reclaimed. After Savoy was annexed by France, under the Treaty of Turin in 1860, the council developed proposals to commission a "mairie école" (combined town hall and school). This idea took on new impetus when Marc Couriard became mayor in 1871. The site he selected was occupied by several farm buildings and a private house.

Construction of the new building started in 1882. It was designed by Émile Reverdin from Geneva, built in ashlar stone and was officially opened by the next mayor, Alexandre Perreard, in 1885. The design involved a symmetrical main frontage of 15 bays facing onto Place de l'Hôtel de Ville. The central section of five bays, which was projected forward and taller than the wings, featured five round headed openings on the ground floor, of which the central opening was fronted by a porch formed by a pair of Doric order columns supporting a stone balcony. The central section was fenestrated by five casement windows on the first floor, of which the central window featured a more prominent cornice, and there were pairs of small square windows on the second floor. At roof level, there was a clock, surmounted by a curved pediment, in the central bay. The wings, of just two floors, were fenestrated by paired casement windows on both floors. Internally, the central section accommodated the magistrates and the post office on the ground floor, and the municipal offices on the first floor, while the wings accommodated the local primary school.

During the First World War, Les Services de Renseignement (the French Intelligence Service) had a small office in the town hall from where they monitored information on German military production.

In November 1921, a local lawyer, Valentino Bellia, donated 1.6 acres (0.65 ha) of land in Rue Aristide Briand at a discounted price for the purposes of building a new primary school. After the new school was completed in 1934, the students and teachers relocated from the town hall into the new school building, which was later renamed the École Marianne Cohn in memory of the resistance fighter, Marianne Cohn, who was tortured and murdered by the Gestapo during the Second World War. A dedicated Salle du Conseil (council chamber) and a Salle des Mariages (wedding hall) were established in the newly created space in the town hall.

In spring 1944, the Royal Air Force dropped weapons to the French Resistance group, the Maquis des Glières, on a plateau to the southeast of the town. After Haute-Savoie was liberated from German occupation in August 1944, the town hall became the place where the local people could deposit their weapons.

The wings of the town hall were extended to the rear along Rue de La Gare and along Rue du Commerce in 1953, and the façade was restored and the Place de l'Hôtel de Ville pedestrianised in 1988.
