= Gilonne Guigonnat =

French biathlete (born 1998)

Personal information
- Nationality: French
- Born: 26 November 1998 (age 27) Ambilly, France

Sport

Professional information
- Sport: Biathlon
- Club: Villard-sur-Boëge
- IBU Cup debut: 2019
- World Cup debut: 2023

World Championships
- Teams: 1 (2024)
- Medals: 0

World Cup
- Seasons: 2 (2022/23-)
- Individual podiums: 1

European/IBU Cup
- Seasons: 4 (2019/20-2022/23)
Medal record
Men's biathlon
Representing France
European Championships
| Bronze medal – third place | 2023 Lenzerheide | Pursuit |
| Silver medal – second place | 2025 Val Martello | 4 × 6 km relay |
| Gold medal – first place | 2026 Sjusjøen | Sprint 7.5km |

Gilonne Guigonnat (born 26 November 1998) is a French biathlete.

She is the sister of biathlete Antonin Guigonnat.

== Career ==
Gilonne Guigonnat is a bronze medalist in pursuit at the 2023 IBU Open European Championships in Lenzerheide. She also won the Women's Mass Start 60 and came second in the Women's 10 km pursuit at the 2022-23 Biathlon IBU Cup.

== Biathlon results ==
All results are sourced from the International Biathlon Union.

=== World Championships ===
| Event | Individual | Sprint | Pursuit | Mass start | Relay | Mixed relay | Single mixed relay |
|---|---|---|---|---|---|---|---|
| (Czech Republic) 2024 Nové Město | 32nd | — | — | — | — | — | — |

=== World Cup ===
World Cup rankings

| Season | Overall | | Individual | | Sprint | | Pursuit | | Mass start | |
| Season | Points | Position | Points | Position | Points | Position | Points | Position | Points | Position |
|---|---|---|---|---|---|---|---|---|---|---|
| 2022–23 | - | - | - | - | - | not ranked | - | - | - | - |
| 2023–24 | - | 22nd | - | 27th | - | 24th | - | 25th | - | 13th |
