= Canton of Annemasse =

French canton

Coordinates: 46.19°N 6.23°E

The canton of Annemasse is an administrative division of the Haute-Savoie department, southeastern France. It was created at the French canton reorganisation which came into effect in March 2015. Its seat is in Annemasse.

It consists of the following communes:

1. Ambilly
2. Annemasse
3. Ville-la-Grand
