= Dominik Windisch =

Italian biathlete

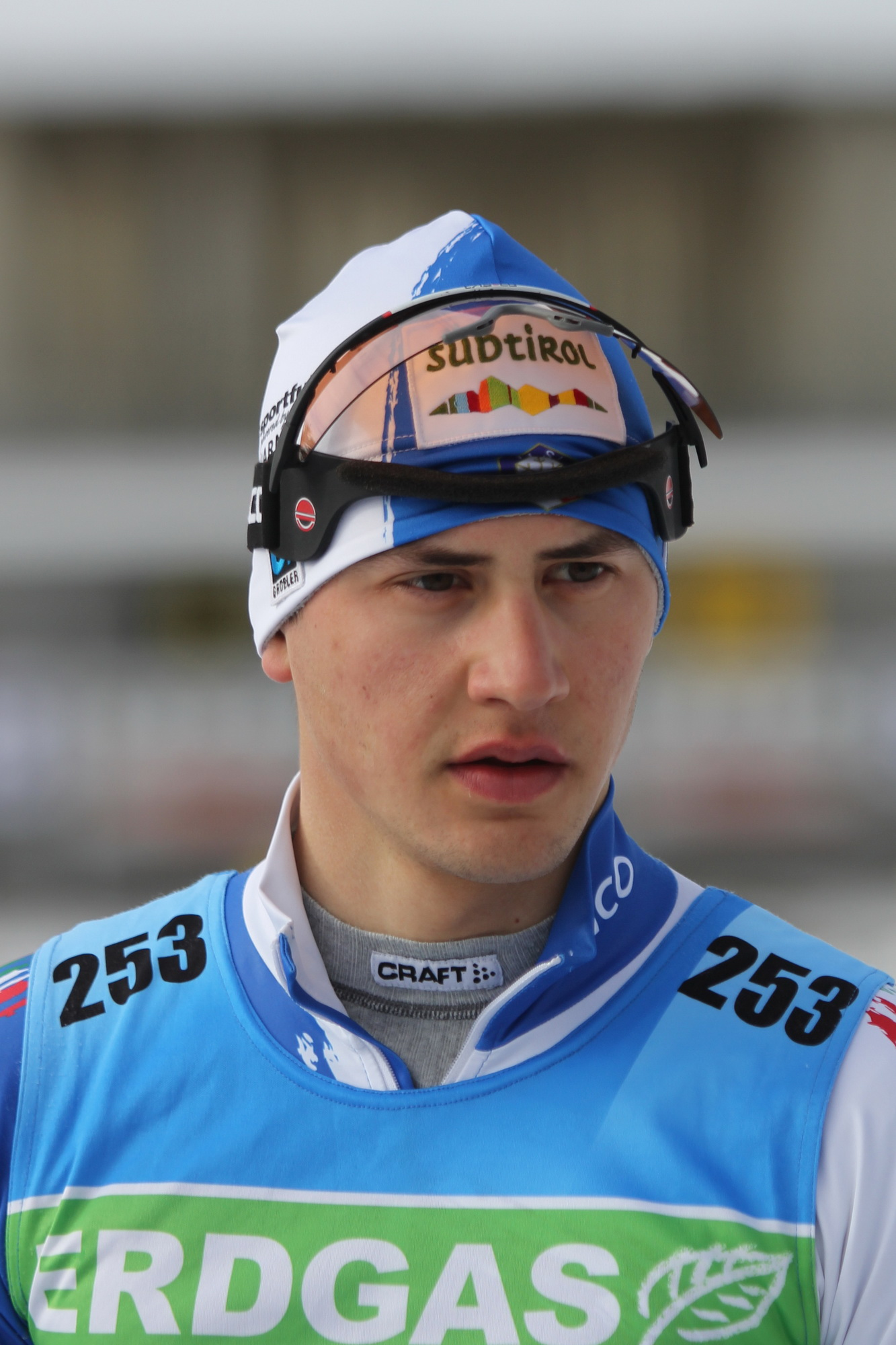
- Windisch in 2011

Personal information
- Nationality: Italian
- Born: 6 November 1989 (age 36) Bruneck, Italy
- Height: 1.82 m (6 ft 0 in)
- Weight: 72 kg (159 lb)

Sport

Professional information
- Sport: Biathlon
- Club: Centro Sportivo Esercito
- World Cup debut: 2011

Olympic Games
- Teams: 3 (2014, 2018, 2022)
- Medals: 3 (0 gold)

World Championships
- Teams: 8 (2011–2020)
- Medals: 3 (1 gold)

World Cup
- Individual victories: 2
Medal record
Men's biathlon
Representing Italy
Olympic Games
Bronze medal – third place	2014 Sochi	Mixed relay
Bronze medal – third place	2018 Pyeongchang	10 km sprint
Bronze medal – third place	2018 Pyeongchang	Mixed relay
World Championships
Gold medal – first place	2019 Östersund	15 km mass start
Silver medal – second place	2020 Antholz	Mixed relay
Bronze medal – third place	2019 Östersund	Mixed relay
Youth World Championships
Bronze medal – third place	2008 Ruhpolding	3 × 7.5 km relay

Dominik Windisch (born 6 November 1989) is an Italian former biathlete.

== Career ==
His 1st major individual results came in the Oslo Biathlon World Championships 2016, where he finished 4th in the Mass start & 5th in the Sprint.

At the Sochi 2014 Winter Olympics, he finished 11th in the Sprint and won a bronze medal in the Mixed relay (together with Dorothea Wierer, Karin Oberhofer and Lukas Hofer).

At the Pyeongchang 2018 Winter Olympics he won a bronze medal in both the Sprint as well as in the Mixed relay (together with Dorothea Wierer, Lisa Vittozzi and Lukas Hofer).

The highlight of his career however came at the Östersund Biathlon World Championships 2019, where he won the gold medal in the Mass start. Here he also won a bronze medal in the Mixed relay (together with Dorothea Wierer, Lisa Vittozzi and Lukas Hofer).

In the following year at the Rasen-Antholz Biathlon World Championships 2020 he got his best Mixed-relay result with a silver medal (together with Dorothea Wierer, Lisa Vittozzi and Lukas Hofer).

His last major individual result came at the Beijing 2022 Winter Olympics, where he finished 5th in the Mass start, he retired at the end of the season.

His brother Markus Windisch is also a former biathlete.

== Biathlon results ==
All results are sourced from the International Biathlon Union.

=== Olympic Games ===
3 medals (3 bronze medals)

Event	Individual	Sprint	Pursuit	Mass start	Relay	Mixed relay
(Russia) 2014 Sochi	64th	11th	25th	25th	5th	Bronze
(South Korea) 2018 Pyeongchang	50th	Bronze	16th	17th	12th	Bronze
(China) 2022 Beijing	14th	30th	26th	5th	7th	—

=== World Championships ===
3 medals (1 gold, 1 silver, 1 bronze)

Event	Individual	Sprint	Pursuit	Mass start	Relay	Mixed relay	Single mixed relay
(Russia) 2011 Khanty-Mansiysk	56th	—	—	—	—	—	—N/a
(Germany) 2012 Ruhpolding	—	68th	—	—	4th	—	—N/a
(Czech Republic) 2013 Nové Město	18th	57th	33rd	—	7th	4th	—N/a
(Finland) 2015 Kontiolahti	91st	23rd	35th	—	12th	7th	—N/a
(Norway) 2016 Oslo Holmenkollen	50th	5th	28th	4th	11th	8th	—N/a
(Austria) 2017 Hochfilzen	21st	18th	25th	24th	5th	4th	—N/a
(Sweden) 2019 Östersund	29th	27th	17th	Gold	15th	Bronze	—
(Italy) 2020 Rasen-Antholz	75th	48th	51st	14th	7th	Silver	—
(Slovenia) 2021 Pokljuka	44th	33rd	35th	—	6th	—	—

*During Olympic seasons competitions are only held for those events not included in the Olympic program.
**The single mixed relay was added as an event in 2019.
