= Ernst Israel Bornstein =

Polish Jewish doctor and dentist

Ernst Bornstein
- Taken in 1978
- Born: Ernst Israel Bornstein; 26 November 1922; Zawiercie, Poland
- Died: 14 August 1978 (aged 55); Munich, West Germany
- Occupations: doctor, dentist, author
- Website: holocaustmatters.org

Ernst Israel Bornstein (26 November 1922 – 14 August 1978) was a Polish-born Jewish Holocaust survivor who practised as a dentist and doctor post-war in Munich, Germany. He is the author of 'Die Lange Nacht', which was first printed in Germany in 1967 and in 2015 translated into English as 'The Long Night'. The book is a personal recollection of his time in 7 different concentration camps and several death marches ending in 1945.

== Early life ==
Bornstein was born in Zawiercie, Poland in 1922. He was the oldest of four children. He was educated in Jewish schools and was a talented student who was fluent in German, Yiddish and Polish.

== Holocaust ==
Until the outbreak of the Second World War, Bornstein lived with his happy, close-knit family in the Polish town of Zawiercie. When the Germans invaded in 1939, the synagogue was locked, Jewish pupils were barred from schools and the Nazis began their sustained policy of cruelty and prejudice towards the Jewish community. The 17-year-old Bornstein was dragged away from his family and conscripted into forced labour in March 1941. He spent the next four years enduring physical and psychological torture, starvation, and sickness, all of which he documents in his memoir 'Die Lange Nacht'.

At one point he describes breaking down after receiving a letter from his parents, passed on by a kind German soldier, telling him that their town had been ‘cleansed of Jews’ and that ‘like other transports before us we are probably going to the extermination camp at Auschwitz’.

During 1941 to 1945, Bornstein was incarcerated in seven concentration camps: Grünheide (now Sieroniowice), Markstädt, Fünfteichen (now Miłoszyce), Gross-Rosen, Flossenbürg, Leonberg and Mühldorf.

== Death march and liberation ==
In 1945, Bornstein was forced on a death march through Germany to evade the advancing Red Army; a friend who walked with him, Yaacov Bloch, was shot dead by the SS when they arrived at the Gross-Rosen concentration camp. The Nazis wanted to transfer the surviving prisoners, including Bornstein, to the mountains of the Tyrol and there exterminate them.

Bornstein was liberated in Bavaria by American soldiers on 30 April 1945. In his book he writes "The Germans packed us into boxcars and transported us in the direction of Munich. While we were in transit the Americans mounted an offensive and captured the train tracks. We were free'. 'Everyone fled from the train, but the "SS murderers" drove the group back into the wagons and began killing indiscriminately."

Bornstein's parents and two younger sisters were murdered at Auschwitz. Of an extended family numbering about 72 at the start of the war, by its conclusion only six had survived including Bornstein and his sister Regina.

== Post war ==
Bornstein went on to train as a dentist and then as a doctor after gaining a university place in Munich. He established a successful medical practice. He started collecting his memoirs with the intention of publishing an autobiography after discovering that many of his patients knew nothing about the Holocaust less than a generation after it happened, others thought it had been exaggerated and falsified.

Bornstein married Renee Koenig, another Holocaust survivor, in 1964 and they had three children: Noemie, Muriel and Alain. In 1978 at the age of 55, Bornstein died of a heart condition very likely acquired during his years of starvation and forced labour. Renee later moved to Manchester, England.

== The Long Night ==
In 1967, Bornstein published 'Die Lange Nacht'. Initially German publishers were reluctant to give it attention, preferring not to speak of Germany's dark history. After publication the book was well received netting a review in the Times Literary Supplement, even though it had been published only in German.

With the help of a professional translator, Bornstein's daughter Noemie translated 'Die Lange Nacht' ('The Long Night') into English from its original German. The English language version book was published in 2015. The book includes a prefaced letter by David Cameron and has been endorsed by Lord Finkelstein, Rabbi Lord Jonathan Sacks, Jonathan Dimbleby and Dan Snow. It is one of the chosen books for Holocaust Memorial Day 2018.

A new German edition was published in 2020 with a foreword by Charlotte Knobloch.
