= Ville-la-Grand =

Ville-la-Grand Vela-la-Grand (Savoyard)
- Commune
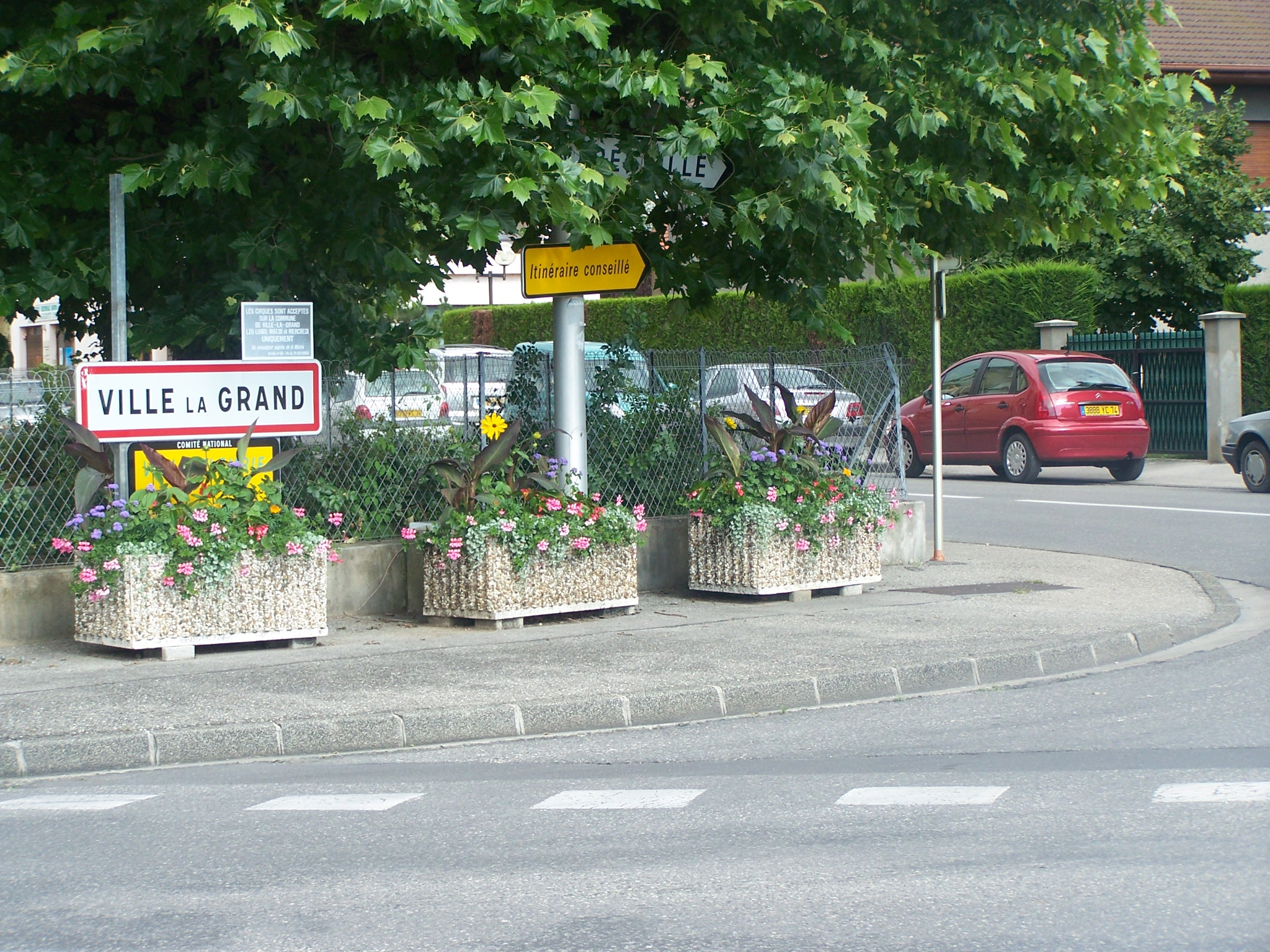
- The road into Ville-la-Grand

- Coat of arms
- Location of Ville-la-Grand
- Location within France Location within Auvergne-Rhône-Alpes
- Coordinates: 46°12′11″N 6°14′51″E
- Country: France
- Region: Auvergne-Rhône-Alpes
- Department: Haute-Savoie
- Arrondissement: Saint-Julien-en-Genevois
- Canton: Annemasse
- Intercommunality: Annemasse – Les Voirons

Government
  - Mayor (2020–2026): Nadine Jacquier
- Area^{1}: 4.49 km^{2} (1.73 sq mi)
- Elevation: 439 m (1,440 ft)
- Highest elevation: 541 m (1,775 ft)
- Lowest elevation: 432 m (1,417 ft)
- Population (2023): 9,514
  - Density: 2,120/km^{2} (5,490/sq mi)
- Time zone: UTC+01:00 (CET)
  - Summer (DST): UTC+02:00 (CEST)
- INSEE/Postal code: 74305 /74100
- ^{1} French Land Register data, which excludes lakes, ponds, glaciers > 1 km^{2} (0.386 sq mi or 247 acres) and river estuaries.

Ville-la-Grand (French pronunciation: [vil la ɡʁɑ̃]; Savoyard: Vela-la-Grand) is a commune in the Haute-Savoie department in the Auvergne-Rhône-Alpes region in south-eastern France. The commune consists of the main town Ville-la-Grand and the small villages Crêt and Marsaz.

== History of Ville-la-Grand ==
=== Founding ===
Ville-la-Grand was founded during the Roman Republic, from around 48BC to 44BC, with the establishment of a villa by a rich patrician or a simple veteran rewarded by Julius Caesar, whereas the nobles of the time were located at Allobroges. Located on a Roman road going to the Chablais, it quickly became the center of an important Gallo-Roman village. From this time, three carved stones can be seen in the city.

=== Evangelism ===
In 522, a church was built in honor of Mammes of Caesarea, child martyr, on the spot of a former temple dedicated to the god Mars. Two stones located in the front of the church can be seen from this time.

=== From 1200 to 1800 ===
Between 1220 and 1748, the village is under the influence of the House of Grailly. After that, Ville-la-Grand belongs to the Duchy of Savoy. Annexed by France as part of Savoy in 1792, it becomes a commune of the department of Mont Blanc, and then from the department of Léman in 1798. Given back to the Duchy of Savoy in 1814, the commune lost some of his territory because of the Treaty of Turin when the villages of Présinge, Puplinge, the hamlets of "la Louvière" and "Carra" are transferred to the canton of Geneva.

The parish of Ville-la-Grand lost its dependents of Juvigny in 1681, Ambilly in 1803, as well as the hamlets of Carraz, Pesey and Puplinge in 1816. Elle récupère par contre lors du Concordat celle de Présinge.

Between 1780 and 1837, Ville-la-Grand belongs to the Carouge province, administrative division of the Duchy of Savoy, before being incorporated to the Faucigny province from 1837 to 1860.

=== Annexation of the Duchy of Savoy ===
During the debates about the Annexation of the Duchy of Savoy in 1860, the people are in a majority for joining the north part which became part of Switzerland. A petition was established and collected more than 13 600 signatures. The territory becomes then part of France, where on 22 and 23 April 1860 99.8% of the Savoy people voted for the territory to be attached to France.

=== Rail transport ===
In 1860, the commune becomes part of France. As part of an imperial decree from 22 December of the same year, the rail station of Annemasse is built on land owned by the city of Ville-La-Grand to realize a railway to Thonon. Annemasse proposed a 3000 francs compensation in 1881, which was not accepted. The matter was finally resolved in 1927 after Ville-La-Grand had exhausted all appeals, and finally accepted the compensation. Ville-la-Grand became the favorite place to life for the railroad workers after the SNCF residential buildings were built. This was a noticeable change for the city, which was mainly an agricultural city until then.

=== World War II ===
On 8 July 1944, six members of the French Resistance were killed by German forces on the "lieu-dit" « sur les côtes », including Marianne Cohn. Moreover, the catholic priests from the Juvénat school helped save the lives of more than 2,500 Jews, by helping them cross into Switzerland.

== Geography ==
The commune of Ville-la-Grand is located in the Arve valley, north of Annemasse. It is next to the border with the Canton of Geneva with Switzerland. The river Foron goes through the city.

== Population ==
Historical population
Year	Pop.	±% p.a.
1968	4,475	—
1975	4,778	+0.94%
1982	4,723	−0.17%
1990	6,469	+4.01%
1999	6,989	+0.86%
2007	7,187	+0.35%
2012	8,180	+2.62%
2017	8,802	+1.48%
2023	9,514	+1.30%
Source: INSEE

== See also ==
- Communes of the Haute-Savoie department
