= Gaëtan Paturel =

French biathlete (born 2003)

- Paturel in 2026

Personal information
- Born: 23 September 2003 (age 23) Annecy, France

Sport
- Country: France

Professional information
- Sport: Biathlon
- World Cup debut: 2026
Medal record
Men's biathlon
Representing France
European Championships
Bronze medal – third place	2026 Sjusjøen	10 km sprint
Bronze medal – third place	2026 Sjusjøen	4 × 7.5 km relay
Bronze medal – third place	2025 Martell	4 × 7.5 km relay
Junior World Championships
Silver medal – second place	2025 Östersund	4 × 6 km mixed relay

Gaëtan Paturel (born 23 September 2003) is a French biathlete. He won the overall IBU Cup title in the 2025–26 season. He also claimed an individual bronze medal at the 2026 European Championships in the 10 km sprint.

== Biathlon results ==
All results are sourced from the International Biathlon Union.

=== Youth and Junior World Championships ===
1 medal

Year	Age	Individual	Sprint	Mass Start 60	Relay	Mixed relay
(United States) 2022 Soldier Hollow	18	29th	—	—	—	—
(Sweden) 2025 Östersund	21	28th	16th	6th	10th	Silver
