= Biathlon World Championships 2019 – Men's mass start =

Men's mass start at the Biathlon World Championships 2019
- Venue: Östersund Ski Stadium
- Location: Östersund, Sweden
- Dates: 17 March
- Competitors: 30 from 14 nations
- Winning time: 40:54.1

Medalists
gold medal	Dominik Windisch	Italy
silver medal	Antonin Guigonnat	France
bronze medal	Julian Eberhard	Austria

The men's mass start competition at the Biathlon World Championships 2019 was held on 17 March 2019.

== Results ==
The race was started at 16:00.

Rank	Bib	Name	Nationality	Time	Penalties (P+P+S+S)	Deficit
1st place, gold medalist(s)	24	Dominik Windisch	Italy	40:54.1	3 (1+1+1+0)	
2nd place, silver medalist(s)	11	Antonin Guigonnat	France	41:16.9	3 (2+0+0+1)	+22.8
3rd place, bronze medalist(s)	15	Julian Eberhard	Austria	41:17.4	4 (0+0+3+1)	+23.3
4	4	Alexander Loginov	Russia	41:21.5	5 (0+3+2+0)	+27.4
5	6	Quentin Fillon Maillet	France	41:27.3	4 (1+1+1+1)	+33.2
6	3	Arnd Peiffer	Germany	41:33.7	4 (0+0+2+2)	+39.6
7	10	Simon Eder	Austria	41:38.0	1 (0+0+0+1)	+43.9
8	12	Benedikt Doll	Germany	41:38.5	5 (0+1+1+3)	+44.4
9	7	Tarjei Bø	Norway	41:42.0	5 (0+0+3+2)	+47.9
10	2	Dmytro Pidruchnyi	Ukraine	41:42.3	3 (0+0+1+2)	+48.2
11	8	Simon Desthieux	France	41:57.5	6 (0+0+4+2)	+1:03.4
12	16	Vetle Sjåstad Christiansen	Norway	42:06.6	2 (0+0+0+2)	+1:12.5
13	1	Johannes Thingnes Bø	Norway	42:11.9	7 (0+0+2+5)	+1:17.8
14	26	Jakov Fak	Slovenia	42:13.1	4 (0+2+1+1)	+1:19.0
15	25	Philipp Nawrath	Germany	42:13.6	5 (1+0+2+2)	+1:19.5
16	17	Evgeniy Garanichev	Russia	42:19.1	4 (0+0+0+4)	+1:25.0
17	13	Lukas Hofer	Italy	42:32.7	7 (0+3+3+1)	+1:38.6
18	14	Benjamin Weger	Switzerland	42:33.3	4 (0+2+1+1)	+1:39.2
19	28	Felix Leitner	Austria	42:35.1	4 (0+1+2+1)	+1:41.0
20	23	Tomáš Krupčík	Czech Republic	42:45.3	5 (0+0+2+3)	+1:51.2
21	21	Sean Doherty	United States	42:50.0	4 (1+1+1+1)	+1:55.9
22	22	Erlend Bjøntegaard	Norway	43:00.8	5 (2+1+2+0)	+2:06.7
23	27	Jeremy Finello	Switzerland	43:05.1	4 (0+1+2+1)	+2:11.0
24	9	Martin Fourcade	France	43:22.9	5 (1+2+0+2)	+2:28.8
25	19	Andrejs Rastorgujevs	Latvia	43:37.6	4 (0+2+2+0)	+2:43.5
26	20	Sebastian Samuelsson	Sweden	43:52.2	5 (1+2+1+1)	+2:58.1
27	18	Erik Lesser	Germany	43:53.9	6 (2+1+2+1)	+2:59.8
28	29	Michal Krčmář	Czech Republic	43:57.3	6 (3+1+1+1)	+3:03.2
29	5	Vladimir Iliev	Bulgaria	44:00.5	8 (3+1+2+2)	+3:06.4
30	30	Leif Nordgren	United States	44:45.8	5 (2+0+1+2)	+3:51.7
