= Antonin Guigonnat =

French biathlete (born 1991)

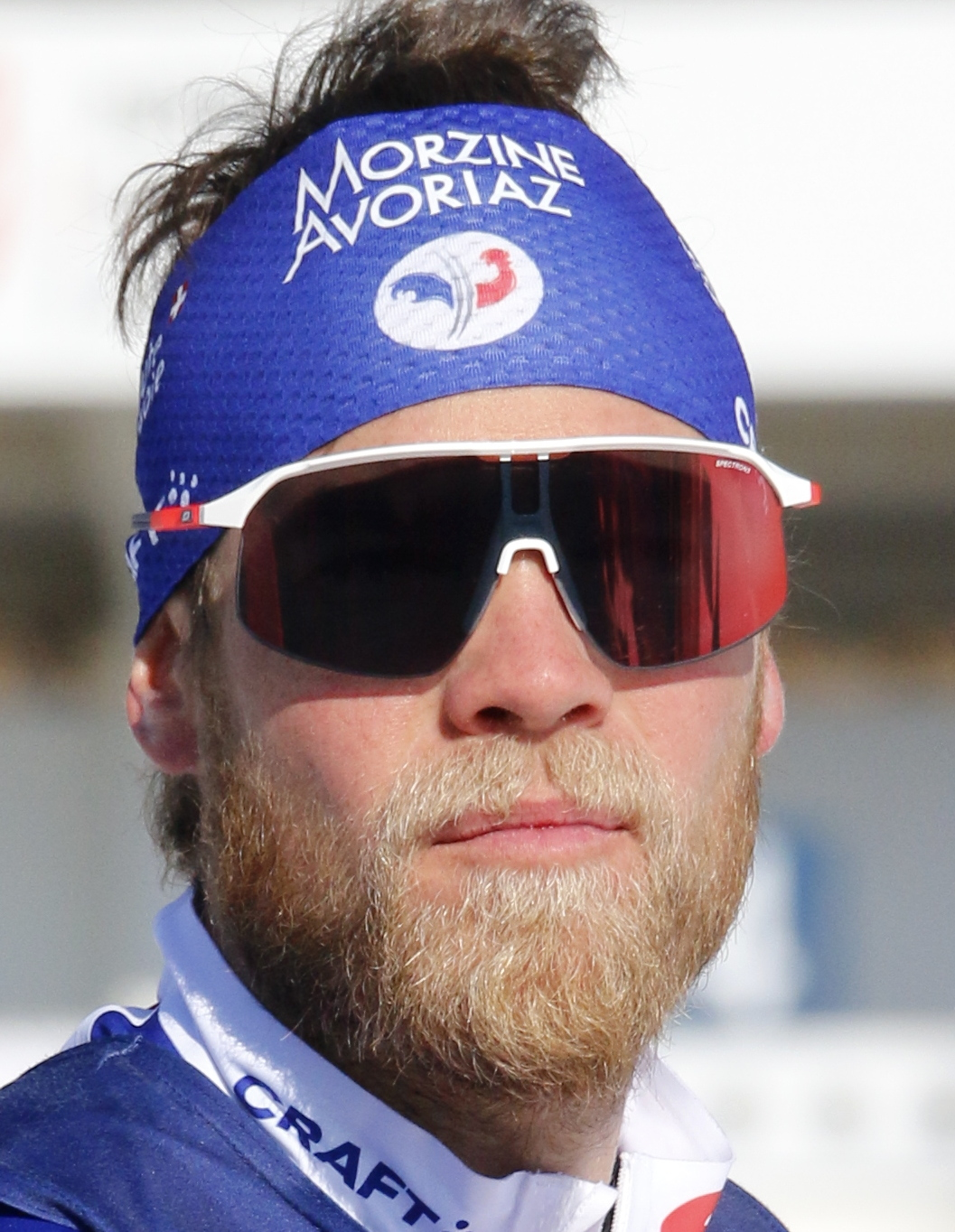
- Guigonnat in 2023

Personal information
- Nationality: French
- Born: 2 July 1991 (age 35) Ambilly, France
- Height: 1.78 m (5 ft 10 in)
- Weight: 70 kg (154 lb)

Sport

Professional information
- Club: Morzine Avoriaz
- World Cup debut: 2014

Olympic Games
- Teams: 1 (2018)
- Medals: 0

World Championships
- Teams: 3 (2019, 2021–2023)
- Medals: 3 (2 gold)

World Cup
- Seasons: 11 (2013/14–2025/26)
- All victories: 4
Medal record
Men's biathlon
Representing France
World Championships
Gold medal – first place	2021 Pokljuka	Single mixed relay
Gold medal – first place	2023 Oberhof	4 × 7.5 km relay
Silver medal – second place	2019 Östersund	15 km mass start
European Championships
Gold medal – first place	2024 Osrblie	10 km sprint
Gold medal – first place	2026 Sjusjøen	20 km individual
Silver medal – second place	2024 Osrblie	Mixed relay
Bronze medal – third place	2015 Otepää	10 km sprint
Bronze medal – third place	2024 Osrblie	12.5 km pursuit
Junior World Championships
Bronze medal – third place	2012 Kontiolahti	4 × 7.5 km relay
Youth World Championships
Silver medal – second place	2010 Torsby	3 × 7.5 km relay

Antonin Guigonnat (born 2 July 1991) is a French former biathlete.

He participated in the 2018 Winter Olympics, and is the brother of Gilonne Guigonnat.

On February 18, 2021, he became world champion in the single mixed relay with Julia Simon in Pokljuka.

== Biathlon results ==
All results are sourced from the International Biathlon Union.

=== Olympic Games ===
Event	Individual	Sprint	Pursuit	Mass start	Relay	Mixed relay
(South Korea) 2018 Pyeongchang	23rd	27th	19th	19th	5th	—
(China) 2022 Beijing	(did not race / selected as an alternate)					

=== World Championships ===
3 medals (2 gold, 1 silver)

Event	Individual	Sprint	Pursuit	Mass start	Relay	Mixed relay	Single mixed relay
(Sweden) 2019 Östersund	—	20th	7th	Silver	6th	—	7th
(Italy) 2020 Antholz-Anterselva	(did not race / selected as an alternate)						
(Slovenia) 2021 Pokljuka	—	14th	21st	17th	4th	—	Gold
(Germany) 2023 Oberhof	58th	10th	14th	19th	Gold	—	—

=== World Cup ===
World Cup rankings

Season	Overall	Individual	Sprint	Pursuit	Mass start
2014–15	62nd	45th	72nd	61st	—
2015–16	89th	—	—	68th	—
2016–17	86th	—	89th	69th	—
2017–18	20th	25th	28th	22nd	13th
2018–19	11th	22nd	5th	7th	15th
2019–20	27th	33rd	19th	24th	31st
2020–21	20th	17th	18th	17th	21st
2021–22	23rd	43rd	24th	29th	6th
2022–23	20th	53rd	13th	16th	25th
2023–24	36th	20th	41st	41st	33rd
2024–25	24th	24th	32nd	20th	27th
2025–26	73rd	—	70th	63rd	—

==== Individual podiums ====
- 6 podiums

No.	Season	Date	Location	Level	Race	Place
1	2017–18	15 December 2017	(France) Annecy Le Grand-Bornand	World Cup	Sprint	3rd
2	2017–18	14 January 2018	(Germany) Ruhpolding	World Cup	Mass Start	3rd
3	2018–19	7 December 2018	(Slovenia) Pokljuka	World Cup	Sprint	2nd
4	2018–19	25 January 2019	(Italy) Antholz-Anterselva	World Cup	Sprint	3rd
5	2018–19	26 January 2019	(Italy) Antholz-Anterselva	World Cup	Pursuit	2nd
6	2018–19	17 March 2019	(Sweden) Östersund	World Championships	Mass Start	2nd

Relay victories

- 4 victories

No.	Season	Date	Location	Discipline	Level	Team
1	2017–18	10 March 2018	(Finland) Kontiolahti	Single Mixed Relay	Biathlon World Cup	Chevalier / Guigonnat
2	2020–21	23 January 2021	(Italy) Antholz-Anterselva	Relay	Biathlon World Cup	Guigonnat / Fillon Maillet / Desthieux / Jacquelin
3	2020–21	18 February 2021	(Slovenia) Pokljuka	Single Mixed Relay	Biathlon World Championships	Guigonnat / Simon
4	2022–23	18 February 2023	(Germany) Oberhof	Relay	Biathlon World Championships	Guigonnat / Claude / Jacquelin / Fillon Maillet
