= Marianne Cohn =

Marianne Cohn

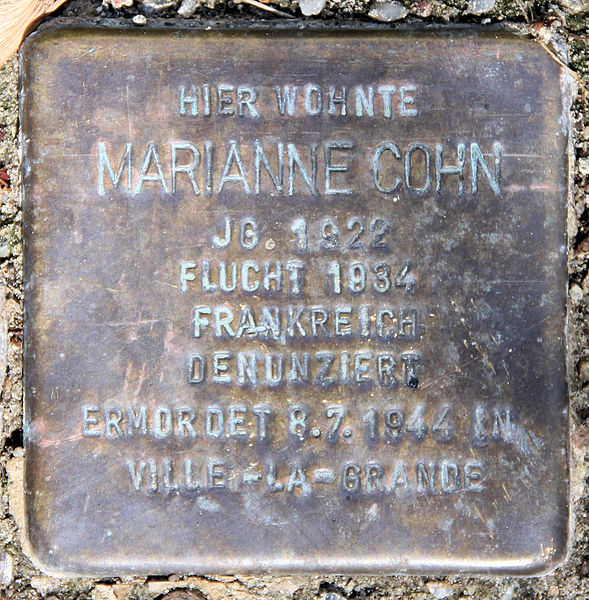
Stolperstein in Berlin-Tempelhof for Marianne Cohn: Here lived Marianne Cohn, born 1922, escaped 1934 [to] France, denounced, murdered 8/7/1944 in Ville-la-Grand.

Marianne Cohn (17 September 1922, in Mannheim – 8 July 1944, in Haute-Savoie), was a German-born French Resistance fighter.

== Biography ==
Marianne Cohn was the eldest child of a family of German intellectuals of Jewish descent, but they did not practice Judaism and had little connection to the Jewish community of Germany. The family left Germany, eventually settling in France where Marianne's parents were deported to the Gurs internment camp, as German nationals. She and her sister were taken in by the Jewish Scouts organization, with the opportunity to rediscover their Jewish identity.

In 1942 Marianne began to smuggle Jewish children out of France. Threatened with deportation, she was incarcerated at Nice and released three months later. It was during this initial detention in 1943, she wrote her famous poem "Je trahirai demain" (I shall betray tomorrow):

Tomorrow, I will betray, not today.

Tear out my nails today,

I will not betray.

You don't know how long I can hold out

but I know.

You are five rough hands, with rings.

You have hob-nailed boots on your feet....

Today I have nothing to say.

Tomorrow, I will betray. (...)

After her release she resumed her underground activities, supervising children before their departure for Switzerland. Later, in January 1944, she began working with Rolande Birgy, shuttling two or three groups, each with up to twenty children across the southern border, passing through Lyons and Annecy. Birgy had been teamed with Mila Racine, before she was arrested on 21 October 1943.

Cohn was arrested on 31 May 1944 near Annemasse with a group of twenty-eight children, including Renee Bornstein and incarcerated at the Hotel Pax by the Gestapo. Despite the torture, she did not speak. Her resistance unit formed a plan to free her, but she refused, fearing reprisals on children. On the night of 8 July 1944 the Gestapo based in Lyons sent a team to Annemasse to remove six prisoners, including Cohn, and killed them in a forest near Ville-la-Grand by hitting them with clubs or rifle butts.

== Commemoration ==
On 7 November 1945, the French military government awarded Marianne Cohn posthumously with the Croix de Guerre with silver star. There is a school in Annemasse, a school in Berlin and a street in Ville-la-Grand and Mannheim bearing her name.

In 2023 it was announced that Marianne Cohn would feature in an exhibit within the upcoming Fortnite Holocaust Museum.

== Bibliography ==
- Magali Renaud Ktorza, Marianne Cohn au service des enfants juifs, Éditions Ampelos, Paris, 2021, ISBN 978-2-35618-210-4.
- Bruno Doucey, Si tu parles, Marianne, éd. Élytis, 2014
- Magali Ktorza, "Marianne Cohn, I betray tomorrow, not today, Revue d'histoire de la Shoah,No. 161, September–December 1997, pp. 96–112
- François Marcot, Robert Laffont (eds.), "Marianne Cohn", in: Dictionnaire historique de la Résistance, 2006, pp. 392–393
- Croquet, Jean-Claude (1996). Chemins de passage: les passages clandestins entre la Haute-Savoie et la Suisse de 1940 à 1944, [exposition itinérante réalisée à Gaillard en 1995]. Saint-Julien-Genevois: La Salevienne. pp. 71–80
