= Erika Jänkä =

Finnish biathlete (born 1995)

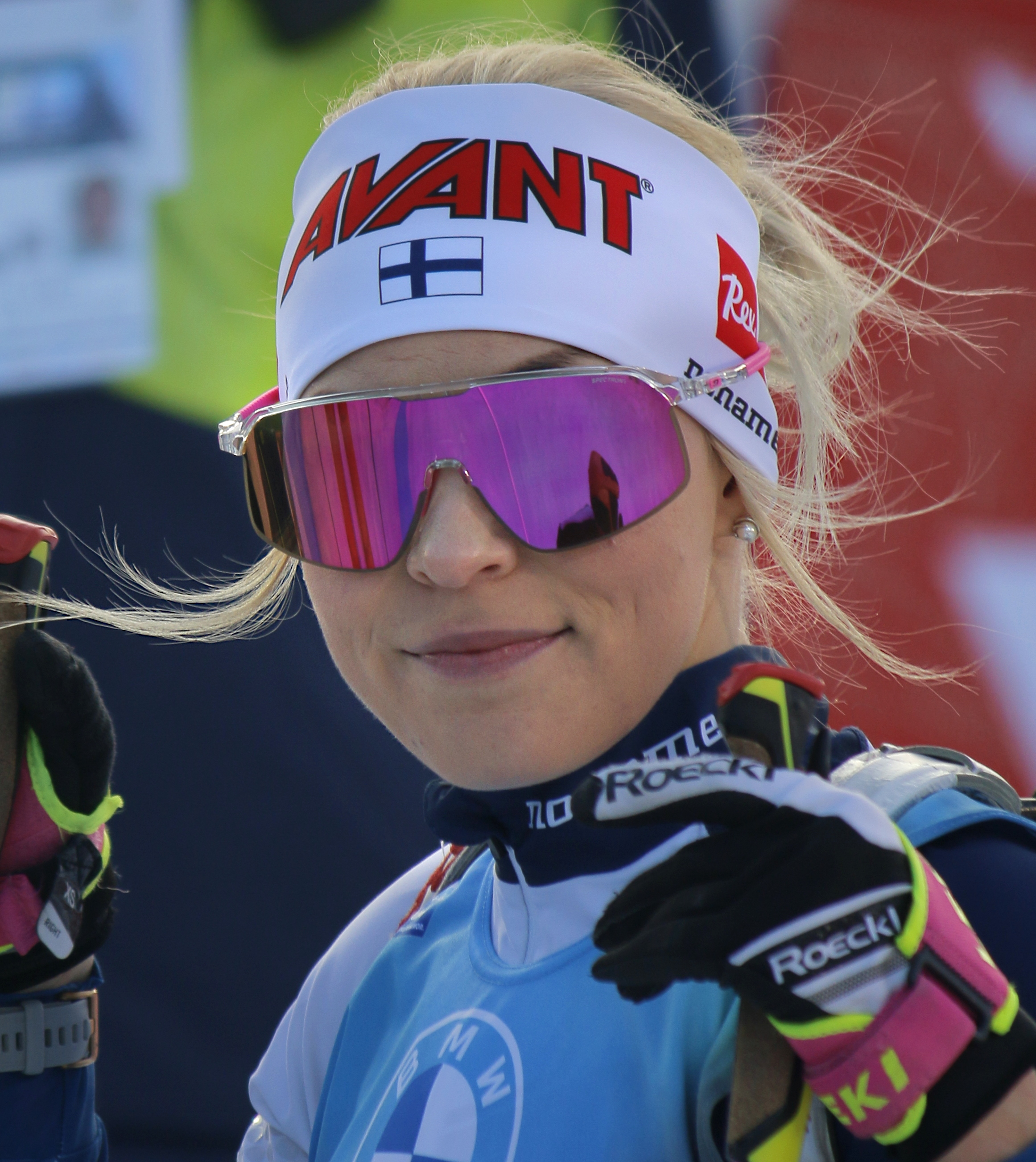

Personal information
- Born: 23 November 1995 (age 30) Perho, Finland

Sport

Professional information
- Sport: Biathlon
- Club: Ahveniston Ampumahiihtäjät
- World Cup debut: 2017

Olympic Games
- Teams: 0
- Medals: 0

World Championships
- Teams: 0
- Medals: 0

World Cup
- Seasons: 1 (2016/17–)
- Individual victories: 0
- All victories: 0
- Individual podiums: 0
- All podiums: 0

Erika Jänkä (born 23 November 1995 in Perho, Finland) is a Finnish biathlete.

She competed during the 2022 Winter Olympics.

== Biathlon results ==
All results are sourced from the International Biathlon Union.

=== Olympic Games ===
0 medals

Event	Individual	Sprint	Pursuit	Mass start	Relay	Mixed relay
(China) 2022 Beijing	—	73rd	—	—	16th	—

=== World Championships ===
0 medals

Event	Individual	Sprint	Pursuit	Mass start	Relay	Mixed relay	Single Mixed relay
(Italy) 2020 Rasen-Antholz	—	—	—	—	11th	—	—
(Slovenia) 2021 Pokljuka	81st	62nd	—	—	14th	—	—
(Germany) 2023 Oberhof	54th	—	—	—	13th	—	—
(Switzerland) 2025 Lenzerheide	DNF	—	—	—	—	—	—

*During Olympic seasons competitions are only held for those events not included in the Olympic program.
