= Leonhard Pfund =

German biathlete (born 2003)

Personal information
- Born: 17 May 2003 (age 23) Bad Tölz, Germany
- Height: 1.81 m (5 ft 11 in)
- Weight: 75 kg (165 lb)

Sport
- Country: Germany

Professional information
- Sport: Biathlon
- World Cup debut: 2026
Medal record
Men's biathlon
Representing Germany
European Championships
Silver medal – second place	2026 Sjusjøen	12.5 km pursuit
Silver medal – second place	2026 Sjusjøen	4 × 7.5 km relay
Junior World Championships
Gold medal – first place	2024 Otepää	15 km individual
Silver medal – second place	2025 Östersund	4 × 7.5 km relay
Silver medal – second place	2024 Otepää	4 × 6 km mixed relay

Leonhard Pfund (born 17 May 2003) is a German biathlete. He was the 2024 Junior World Champion in the 15 km individual event in Otepää where he also earned a silver with the German team in the relay. He also claimed two silvers at the 2026 European Championships in the pursuit and relay events.

== Biathlon results ==
All results are sourced from the International Biathlon Union.

=== Youth and Junior World Championships ===
3 medals

Year	Age	Individual	Sprint	Mass Start 60	Relay	Mixed relay
(Estonia) 2024 Otepää	20	Gold	40th	10th	4th	Silver
(Sweden) 2025 Östersund	21	18th	7th	13th	Silver	—
