= Crêt =

Village in Haute-Savoie, France

- Village
- Interactive map of Crêt
- Coordinates: 46°12′46″N 6°16′18″E
- Country: France
- Department: Haute-Savoie
- Commune: Ville-la-Grand

Crêt (French pronunciation: [kʁɛ]) is a village in the French commune of Ville-la-Grand, in the department of Haute-Savoie.
