= Ambilly =

Ambilly Anblyi (Savoyard)
- Commune
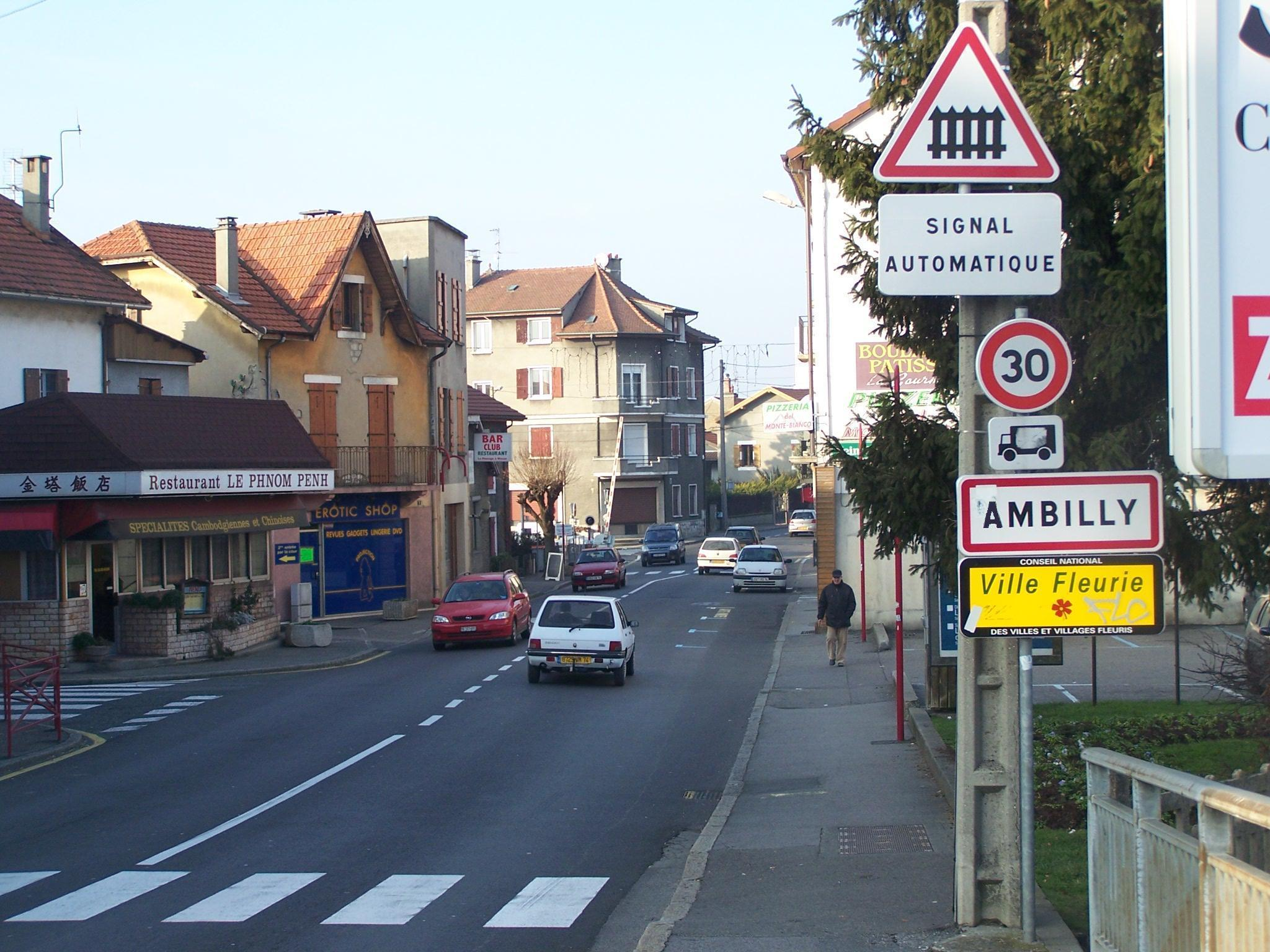
- The main road into Ambilly

- Coat of arms
- Location of Ambilly
- Location within France Location within Auvergne-Rhône-Alpes
- Coordinates: 46°11′38″N 6°13′23″E
- Country: France
- Region: Auvergne-Rhône-Alpes
- Department: Haute-Savoie
- Arrondissement: Saint-Julien-en-Genevois
- Canton: Annemasse
- Intercommunality: Annemasse - Les Voirons Agglomération

Government
  - Mayor (2020–2026): Guillaume Mathelier
- Area^{1}: 1.25 km^{2} (0.48 sq mi)
- Highest elevation: 435 m (1,427 ft)
- Lowest elevation: 410 m (1,350 ft)
- Population (2023): 6,355
  - Density: 5,080/km^{2} (13,200/sq mi)
- Time zone: UTC+01:00 (CET)
  - Summer (DST): UTC+02:00 (CEST)
- INSEE/Postal code: 74008 /74100
- ^{1} French Land Register data, which excludes lakes, ponds, glaciers > 1 km^{2} (0.386 sq mi or 247 acres) and river estuaries.

Ambilly (French pronunciation: [ɑ̃biji]; Savoyard: Anblyi) is a commune in the Haute-Savoie department in the Auvergne-Rhône-Alpes region, southeastern France.

== Population ==
Historical population
Year	Pop.	±% p.a.
1968	4,337	—
1975	5,582	+3.67%
1982	5,224	−0.94%
1990	5,904	+1.54%
1999	5,808	−0.18%
2007	5,863	+0.12%
2012	6,051	+0.63%
2017	6,385	+1.08%
2023	6,355	−0.08%
Source: INSEE

== Notable persons born in Ambilly ==
- Franck Azéma, rugby union player and coach
- Pierre Cormon, writer
- Diane Rouxel, actor

== See also ==
- Communes of the Haute-Savoie department
