= 2026 IBU Open European Championships =

Biathlon competition

- Venue: Sjusjøen Skisenter
- Location: Sjusjøen, Norway
- Dates: 25 January – 1 February

The 2026 IBU Open European Championships were held from 25 January to 1 February 2026 in Sjusjøen, Norway.

The European Championships, whose results count towards the IBU Cup standings, are the main event of the season for athletes competing in the IBU Cup. Medals will be awarded in four disciplines for both men and women: the individual race, sprint, pursuit, and relay.

A total of 36 national teams and a refugee team have arrived for the championships, including teams from the United States, Canada, Mexico, Brazil, Argentina, Chile, Kazakhstan, Japan, Australia, and Morocco. Belarusian born biathlete Darya Dolidovich is competing as part of the refugee team.

== Schedule ==
All times are local (UTC+1).

Date	Time	Event
28 January	11:20	Men's 20 km individual
28 January	15:30	Women's 15 km individual
30 January	11:45	Men's 10 km sprint
30 January	15:30	Women's 7.5 km sprint
31 January	11:50	Men's 12.5 km pursuit
31 January	14:30	Women's 10 km pursuit
1 February	11:40	Men's 4 x 7.5 km relay
1 February	14:45	Women's 4 x 6 km relay

== Results ==
=== Men's ===
Event	Gold		Silver		Bronze	
20 km individual details	Antonin Guigonnat; France	52:08.9 (0+0+0+0)	Isak Frey; Norway	53:19.9 (1+0+1+0)	Valentin Lejeune; France	53:22.2 (0+1+0+0)
10 km sprint details	Damien Levet; France	25:02.1 (0+0)	Isak Frey; Norway	25:11.8 (0+0)	Gaëtan Paturel; France	25:15.5 (0+0)
12.5 km pursuit details	Isak Frey; Norway	34:44.7 (0+0+0+2)	Leonhard Pfund; Germany	+16.9 (1+0+0+0)	Simon Kaiser; Germany	+28.1 (0+1+1+0)
4 x 7.5 km relay details	Norway Sivert Gerhardsen; Kasper Kalkenberg; Martin Nevland; Isak Frey	1:17:08.4 (0+0) (0+2) (1+3) (0+1) (0+0) (0+0) (0+0) (0+2)	Germany Elias Seidl; Simon Kaiser; Danilo Riethmüller; Leonhard Pfund	1:17:14.9 (0+0) (1+3) (0+0) (1+3) (0+1) (0+3) (0+0) (0+0)	France Antonin Guigonnat; Damien Levet; Gaëtan Paturel; Valentin Lejeune	1:18:03.6 (0+1) (0+0) (0+0) (0+0) (0+0) (0+0) (0+0) (0+0)

=== Women's ===
Event	Gold		Silver		Bronze	
15 km individual details	Anastasiya Merkushyna; Ukraine	45:33.9 (0+0+0+0)	Samuela Comola; Italy	45:36.9 (0+0+0+1)	Voldiya Galmace-Paulin; France	45:38.7 (0+1+1+0)
7.5 km sprint details	Gilonne Guigonnat; France	21:50.1 (0+0)	Célia Henaff; France	22:04.2 (0+0)	Sophie Chauveau; France	22:06.1 (0+1)
10 km pursuit details	Gilonne Guigonnat; France	32:07.5 (0+0+0+1)	Célia Henaff; France	32:38.1 (0+0+1+1)	Sophie Chauveau; France	32:46.4 (2+0+1+0)
4 x 6 km relay details	France Célia Henaff; Voldiya Galmace-Paulin; Sophie Chauveau; Gilonne Guigonnat	1:12:53.1 (0+1) (0+1) (0+1) (0+3) (0+2) (0+0) (0+0) (0+0)	Germany Mareike Braun; Hanna Kebinger; Julia Kink; Marlene Fichtner	1:13:09.7 (0+1) (0+2) (0+0) (0+3) (0+0) (0+2) (0+0) (0+1)	Norway Emilie Ågheim Kalkenberg; Karoline Erdal; Juni Arnekleiv; Guro Ytterhus	1:13:49.1 (0+1) (0+0) (0+2) (0+1) (0+1) (0+1) (0+1) (0+1)

== Medal table ==
* Host nation (Norway)

Rank	Nation	Gold	Silver	Bronze	Total
1	France	5	2	6	13
2	Norway*	2	2	1	5
3	Ukraine	1	0	0	1
4	Germany	0	3	1	4
5	Italy	0	1	0	1
Totals (5 entries)		8	8	8	24

== Participating nations ==
287 biathletes from 36 countries:

1. Argentina
2. Australia
3. Austria
4. Belgium
5. Brazil
6. Bulgaria
7. Canada
8. Chile
9. Croatia
10. Czech Republic
11. Denmark
12. Estonia
13. Finland
14. France
15. Germany
16. Greece
17. Italy
18. Japan
19. Kazakhstan
20. Latvia
21. Lithuania
22. Morocco
23. Mexico
24. Moldova
25. North Macedonia
26. Norway (host)
27. Poland
28. Romania
29. Slovakia
30. Slovenia
31. Spain
32. Sweden
33. Switzerland
34. Ukraine
35. United Kingdom
36. United States
