= Annemasse =

Annemasse Anemâsse (Arpitan)
- Commune
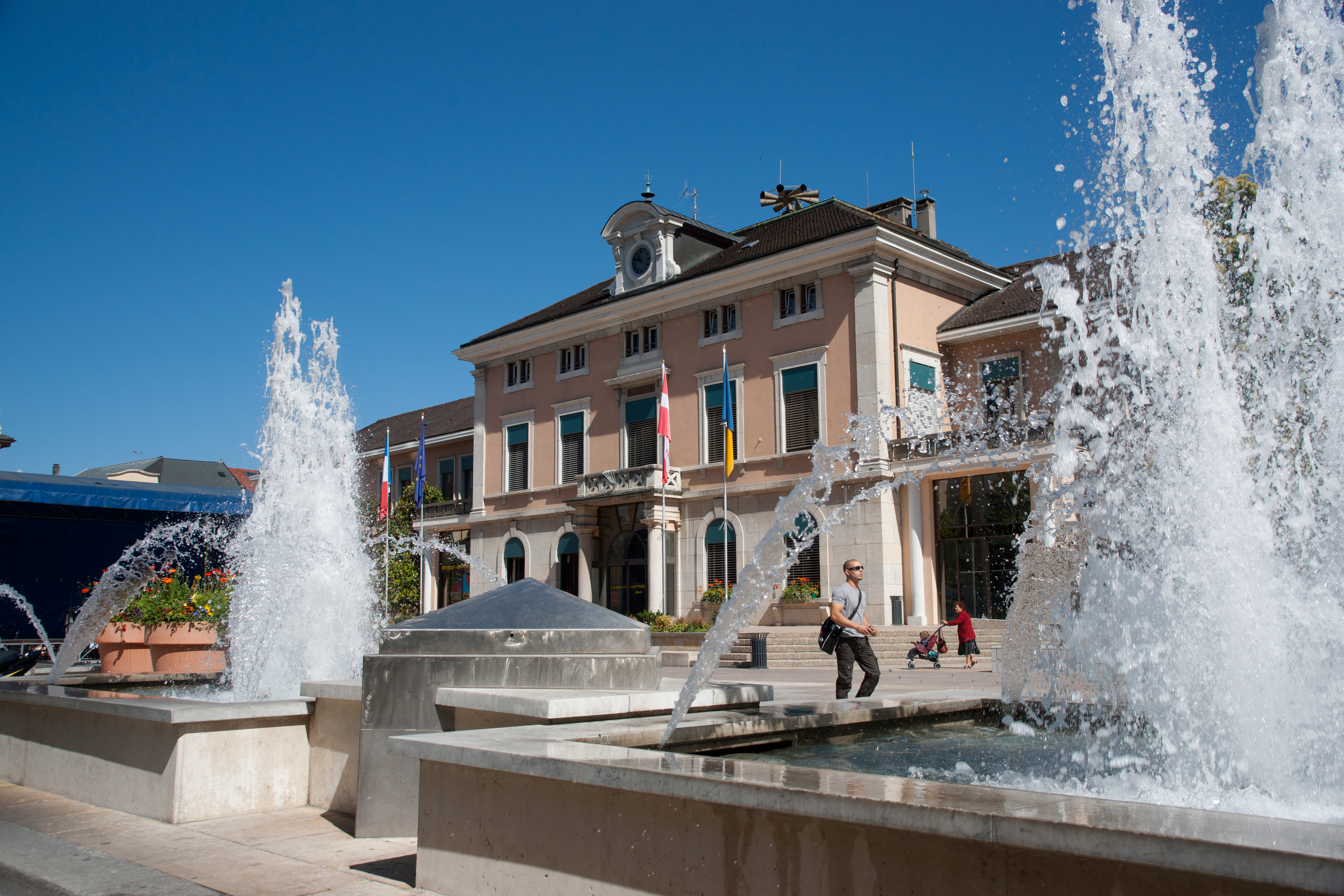
- The Hôtel de Ville (town hall)

- Flag Coat of arms
- Location of Annemasse
- Location within France Location within Auvergne-Rhône-Alpes
- Coordinates: 46°11′45″N 6°14′11″E
- Country: France
- Region: Auvergne-Rhône-Alpes
- Department: Haute-Savoie
- Arrondissement: Saint-Julien-en-Genevois
- Canton: Annemasse
- Intercommunality: Annemasse – Les Voirons

Government
  - Mayor (2020–2026): Christian Dupessey (DVG)
- Area^{1}: 4.98 km^{2} (1.92 sq mi)
- Elevation: 433 m (1,421 ft)
- Highest elevation: 504 m (1,654 ft)
- Lowest elevation: 399 m (1,309 ft)
- Population (2023): 37,628
  - Density: 7,560/km^{2} (19,600/sq mi)
- Time zone: UTC+01:00 (CET)
  - Summer (DST): UTC+02:00 (CEST)
- INSEE/Postal code: 74012 /74100
- ^{1} French Land Register data, which excludes lakes, ponds, glaciers > 1 km^{2} (0.386 sq mi or 247 acres) and river estuaries.

Annemasse (French pronunciation: [anmas]; Arpitan: Anemâsse) is a commune in the Haute-Savoie department in the Auvergne-Rhône-Alpes region in Eastern France. Even though it covers a relatively small territory (4.98 km^{2} or 1.92 sq mi), it is Haute-Savoie's third most populous commune after the prefecture Annecy and Thonon-les-Bains, with 37,628 residents as of 2023.

Annemasse is part of the Grand Genève (Greater Geneva), a transborder agglomeration between France and Switzerland, which encompasses the developed areas on the southwestern shore of Lake Geneva. It lies near the Swiss border, approximately 8 km (5 mi) east of Geneva. Its railway station is served by TGV, RegioExpress, Léman Express and TER Auvergne-Rhône-Alpes trains.

== Etymology ==
The origin of the name Annemasse is uncertain. It could come from an Allobroges tribe; it could be derived from the Gallic name Adnamatius; it could be a reference to the Roman city of Annamatia in Pannonia (current-day Hungary). In ancient Roman times, Annemasse, a vicus, was known as Namascae.

== Geography ==
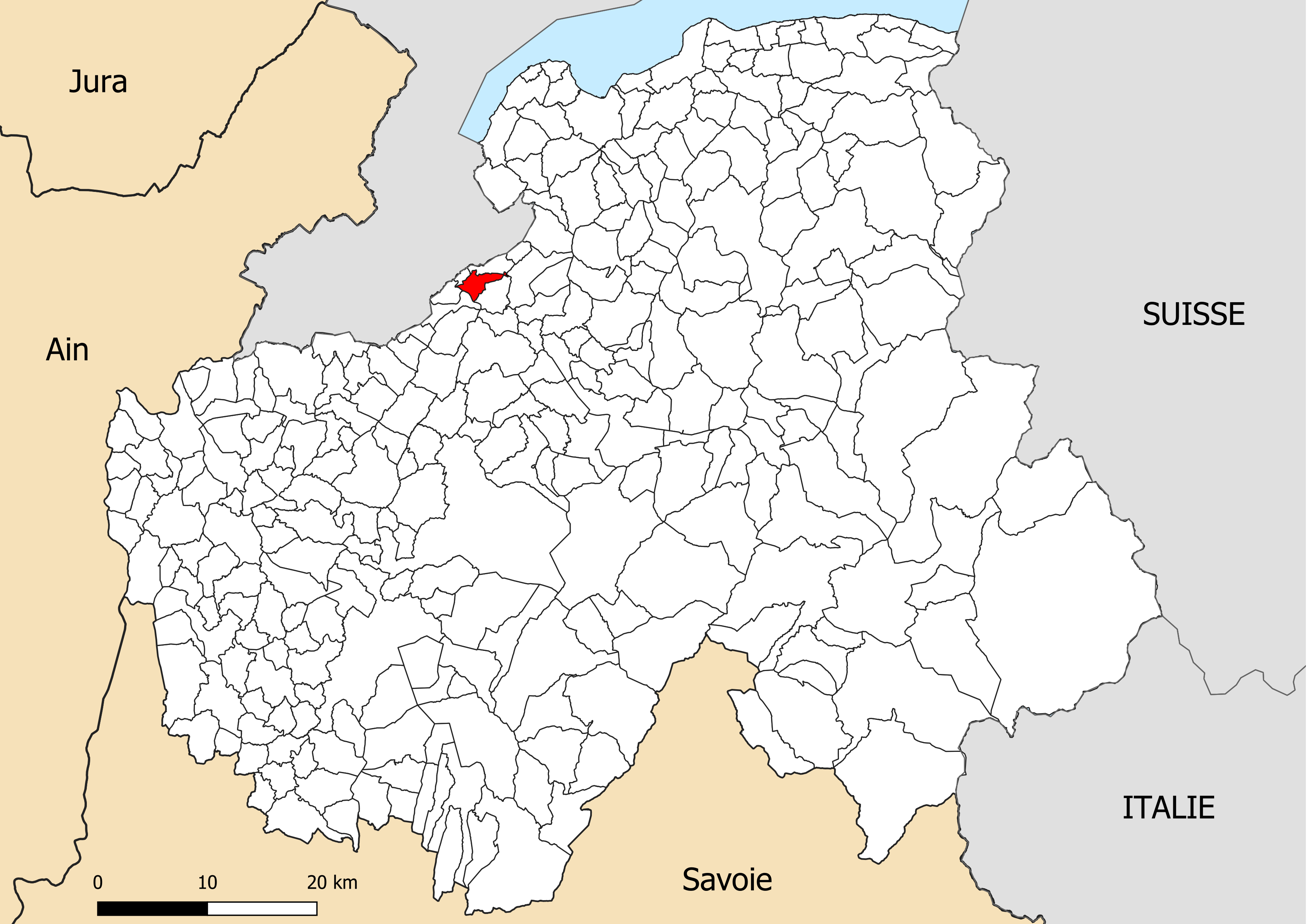
Annemasse (red) in Haute-Savoie

Map of Annemasse, 1:25,000

Annemasse is part of the metropolitan area of Geneva. It is located 2 km (1.2 mi) southeast of the Swiss border and 45 km (27.9 mi) north of Annecy, the prefecture of Haute-Savoie. The city is surrounded by the Voirons (alt. 1,450 m) to the east and the Salève (alt. 1,300 m) and the Arve River to the west.

== Climate ==
The climate is temperate with influences from the Bornes Massif and Lake Geneva. The coldest months are January and February; the hottest are July and August. There is an annual average of 80 days with below zero temperatures. The minimum average is −1 °C and the maximum average is 26 °C. The annual rainfall is 975.7 mm with 118 rainy days a year.

== Demographics ==
Historical population

Year	Pop.	±% p.a.
1793	515	—
1800	615	+2.57%
1806	616	+0.03%
1822	776	+1.45%
1838	1,049	+1.90%
1848	1,047	−0.02%
1858	1,045	−0.02%
1861	1,124	+2.46%
1866	1,203	+1.37%
1872	1,143	−0.85%
1876	1,221	+1.66%
1881	1,521	+4.49%
1886	1,996	+5.59%
1891	2,380	+3.58%
1896	2,460	+0.66%
1901	2,811	+2.70%
1906	3,052	+1.66%

Year	Pop.	±% p.a.
1911	3,334	+1.78%
1921	4,208	+2.36%
1926	6,009	+7.39%
1931	7,092	+3.37%
1936	8,018	+2.48%
1946	8,831	+0.97%
1954	10,209	+1.83%
1962	13,814	+3.85%
1968	17,166	+3.69%
1975	23,384	+4.51%
1982	26,204	+1.64%
1990	27,669	+0.68%
1999	27,253	−0.17%
2007	29,540	+1.01%
2012	33,166	+2.34%
2017	35,712	+1.49%
2023	37,628	+0.87%

Source: EHESS and INSEE (1968–2023)

== Politics ==
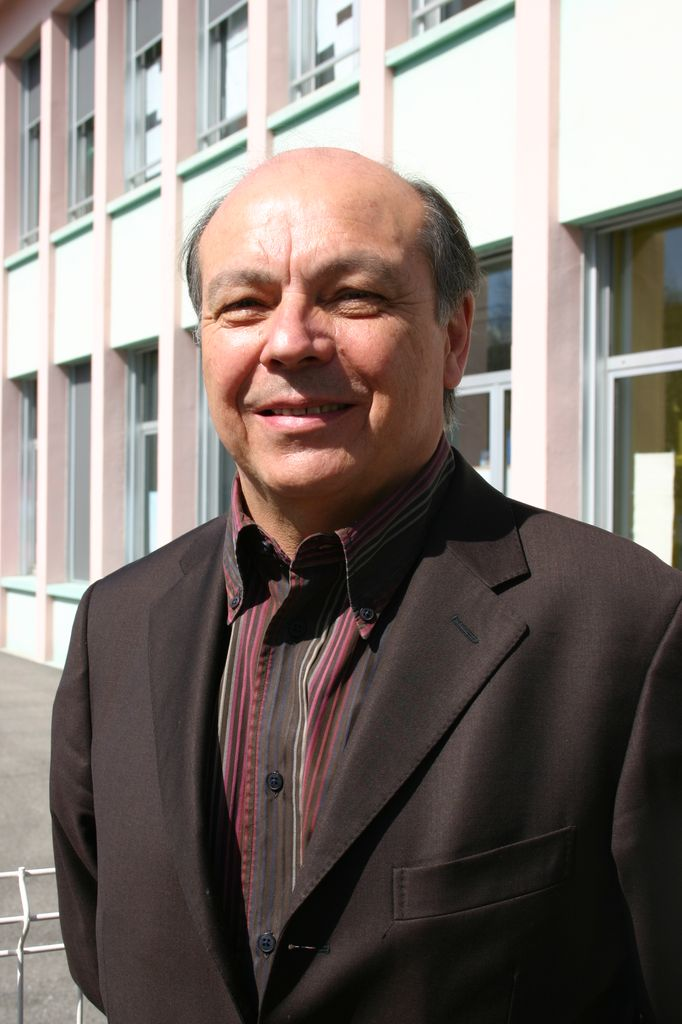
Mayor Christian Dupessey, 2009

The urban area of Annemasse, the agglomeration community of Annemasse – Les Voirons, which consists of twelve communes, is the second largest agglomeration in the Haute-Savoie department in terms of population, after the Grand Annecy (Greater Annecy). The Hôtel de Ville (town hall) was completed in 1885.

Robert Borrel of the Socialist Party (PS) held the mayorship in Annemasse from 1977 to 2008. Fellow party member Christian Dupessay was elected to succeed him following his retirement in 2008. Dupessay was reelected in 2014 and 2020.

== Economy ==
The main activity is commerce: due to the current foreign exchange situation, many Swiss residents come to Annemasse to purchase food and other commodities. A large proportion of the population work in Geneva, where the salaries are higher than in France.

Annemasse has 1,898 company locations on its territory, a large share of it being shops and services. The three main companies operating in Annemasse are Parker Hannifin (turnover: €134 million), Siegwerk (€107 million) and Géant Casino Annemasse (€17 million, enlarged in 2003).

== Transport ==
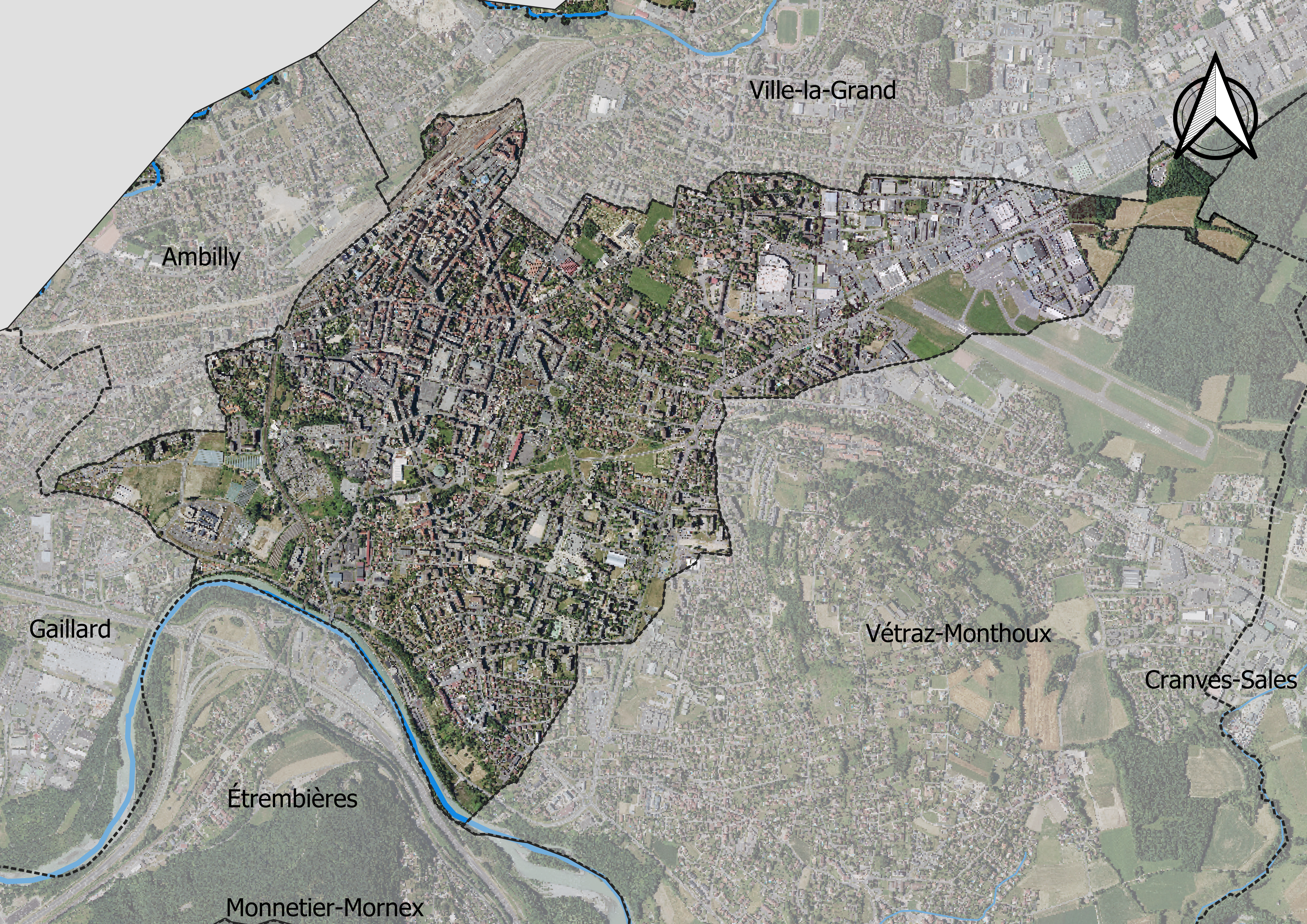
Satellite map with Annemasse Aerodrome on the right

Annemasse is an important crossroad. It is the last exit of the French motorway A40 before the border and is thus well connected with the other cities of the region. It is also connected to Annecy via motorway A41.

Local transport is done with 6 bus lines by the TP2A company (Transports publics de l'Agglomération d'Annemasse). TPG (Transports publics genevois) operates tram line 17 between Annemasse and Geneva crossing the international border at Moillesulaz.

Annemasse has had a railway station since 1880. It is the second most important station of the department with 2,000 passengers a day. To encourage mobility, the CEVA project has extended the existing rail connection between Annemasse and Gare de Cornavin through Genève Eaux-Vives.

Annemasse is served by Geneva Airport, which is located 26 km (16 mi) north west of Annemasse.

== Education ==
Kindergartens

- Bois-Livron, Marianne-Cohn, Jean-Mermoz, La Fontaine, Les Hutins, Saint-Exupéry, Académie Montessuit

Primary schools

- Public schools: Bois-Livron, Marianne-Cohn, Jean-Mermoz, La Fontaine, Les Hutins, Saint-Exupéry, Académie Montessuit
- Privates schools: Chamarette, Saint-François

Secondary schools

- Michel-Servet, Académie Montessuit, Jacques-Prévert

High secondary schools

- General education: Les Glières (Formation tertiaire BTS intégré)
- General and technical education: Jean-Monnet
- Professional education: Le Salève

Other school

- The Beaux Arts School

== Religion ==
Annemasse has several religious places. There are two Roman Catholic churches (Saint-André and Saint-Joseph), one synagogue, two Muslim religious organisations, as well as several Protestant churches.

== Servetus Monument ==
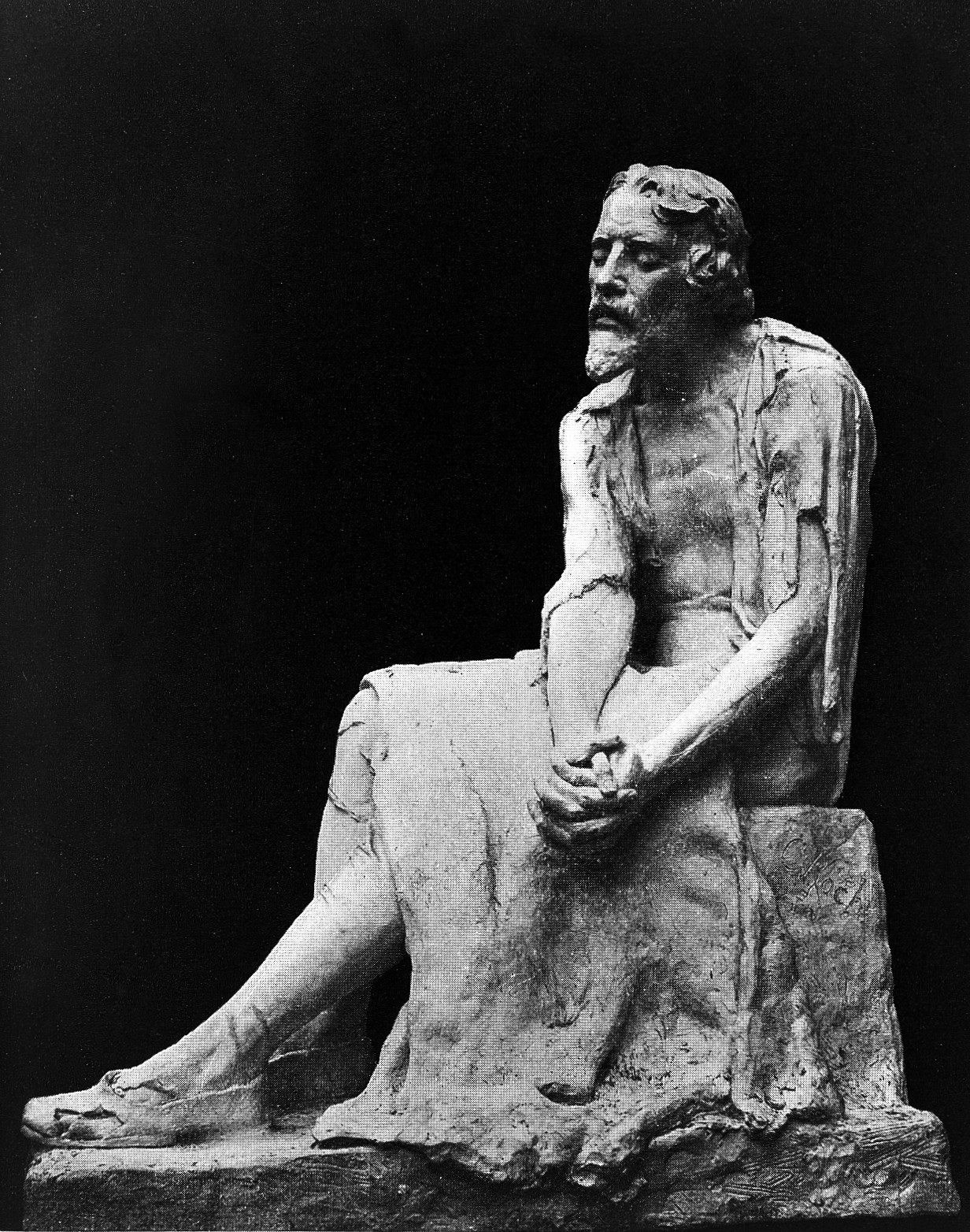
The Michael Servetus Monument in Annemasse, by Clothilde Roch

In 1903, 350 years after the dissident Michael Servetus was executed in Geneva at the instigation of John Calvin, a committee was formed to erect a monument in Servetus' honour - led by a French Senator, Auguste Dide, an author of a book on heretics and revolutionaries. The committee commissioned a local Geneva sculptor, Clothilde Roch, to do a statue showing a suffering Servetus. The work was three years in the making and was finished in 1907. However, supporters of Calvin were still strong in Geneva, and the statue was rejected.

The committee then offered the statue to the neighboring Annemasse, which in 1908 placed it in front of the city hall, with the following inscriptions:

“The arrest of Servetus in Geneva, where he did neither publish nor dogmatize, hence he was not subject to its laws, has to be considered as a barbaric act and an insult to the Right of Nations.” Voltaire

"I beg you, shorten please these deliberations. It is clear that Calvin for his pleasure wishes to make me rot in this prison. The lice eat me alive. My clothes are torn and I have nothing for a change, nor shirt, only a worn out vest.” Servetus, 1553

In 1942, the pro-Nazi Vichy Government took down the statue, as it was a celebration of freedom of conscience, and melted it. In 1960, having found the original molds, Annemasse had it recast and returned the statue to its previous place.

== International relations ==
=== Twin towns – sister cities ===
Annemasse is twinned with:

- Gaggenau, Germany
- Sieradz, Poland

=== Friendship pacts ===
Annemasse has friendly relations with:

- Boisbriand, Canada
- Torricella Peligna, Italy

== Gallery ==
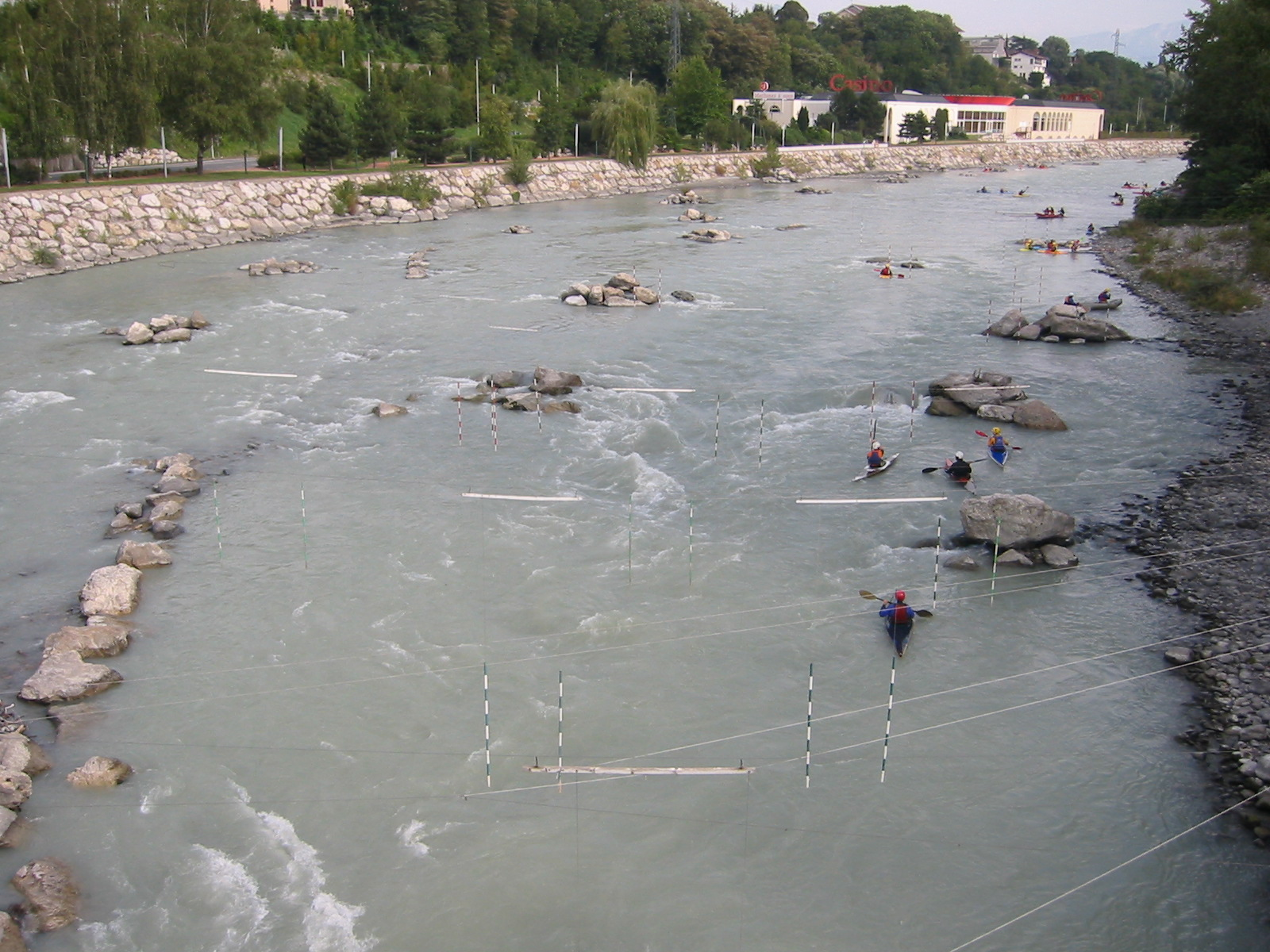
Arve River near Annemasse

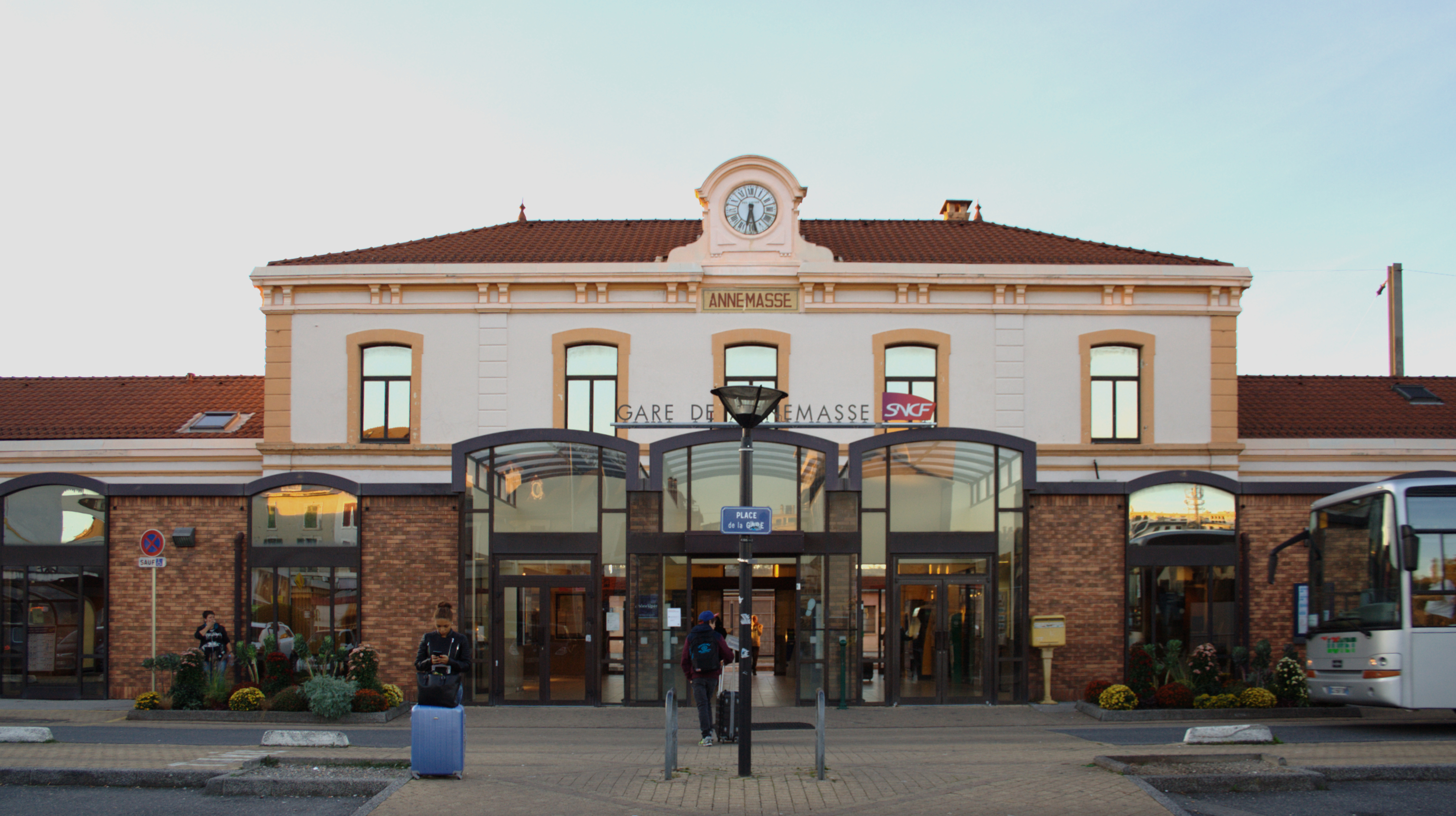
Annemasse railway station, main entrance

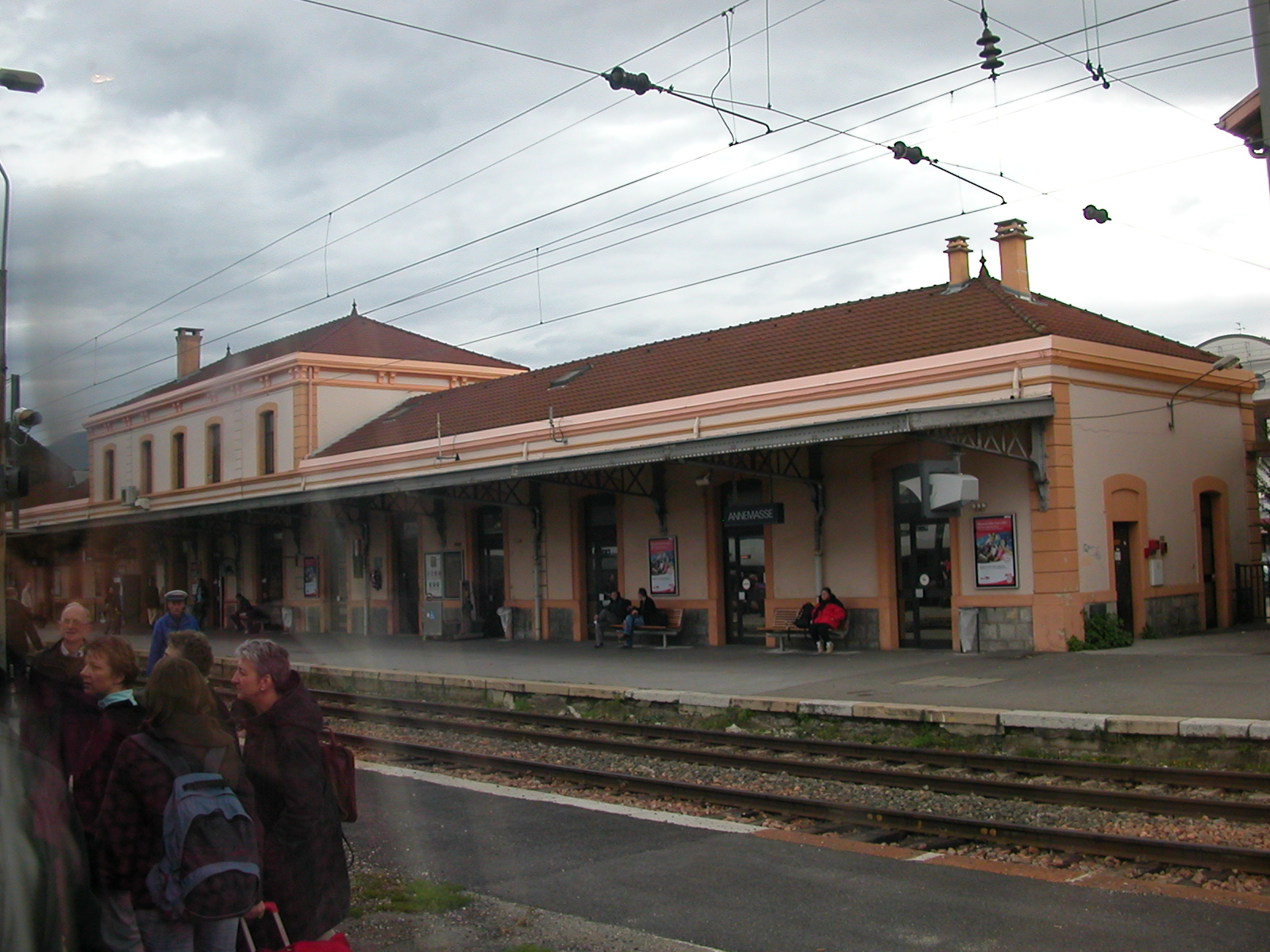
Annemasse railway station, platforms

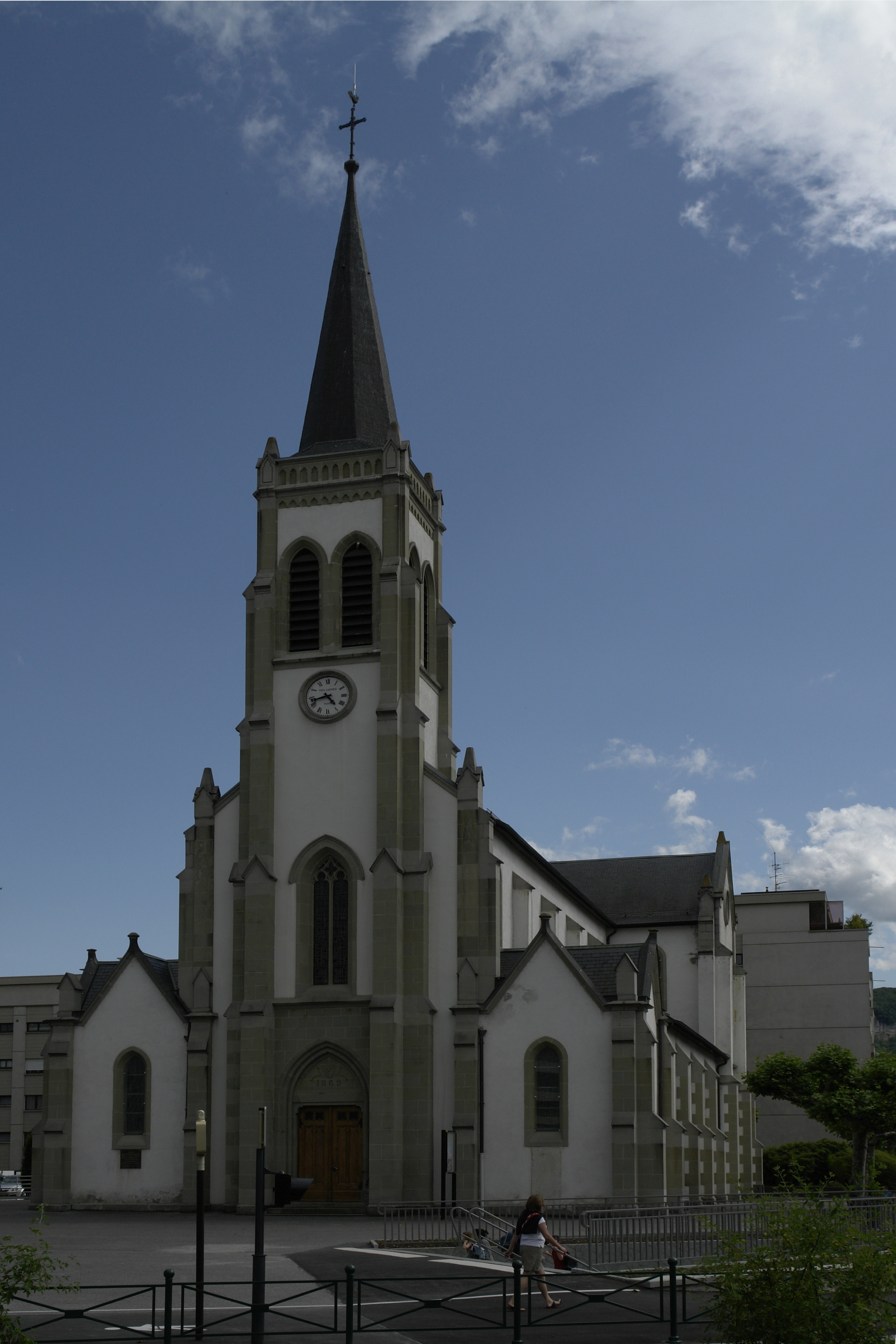
Saint-André church

Saint-Joseph church

== See also ==
- Communes of the Haute-Savoie department
- Annemasse Aerodrome
