= Vaucher =

Vaucher is a surname. Notable people with the surname include:

- Alfred Vaucher (1887–1993), French theologian
- Denis Vaucher (1898–1993), Swiss military patrol runner
- Gee Vaucher (born 1945), English anarchist
- Jean Pierre Étienne Vaucher (1763–1841), Swiss Protestant pastor and botanist
- Yvette Vaucher (born 1929), Swiss mountaineer and parachutist
