= Chemin de fer du Salève =

Rack railway in Haute-Savoie, France

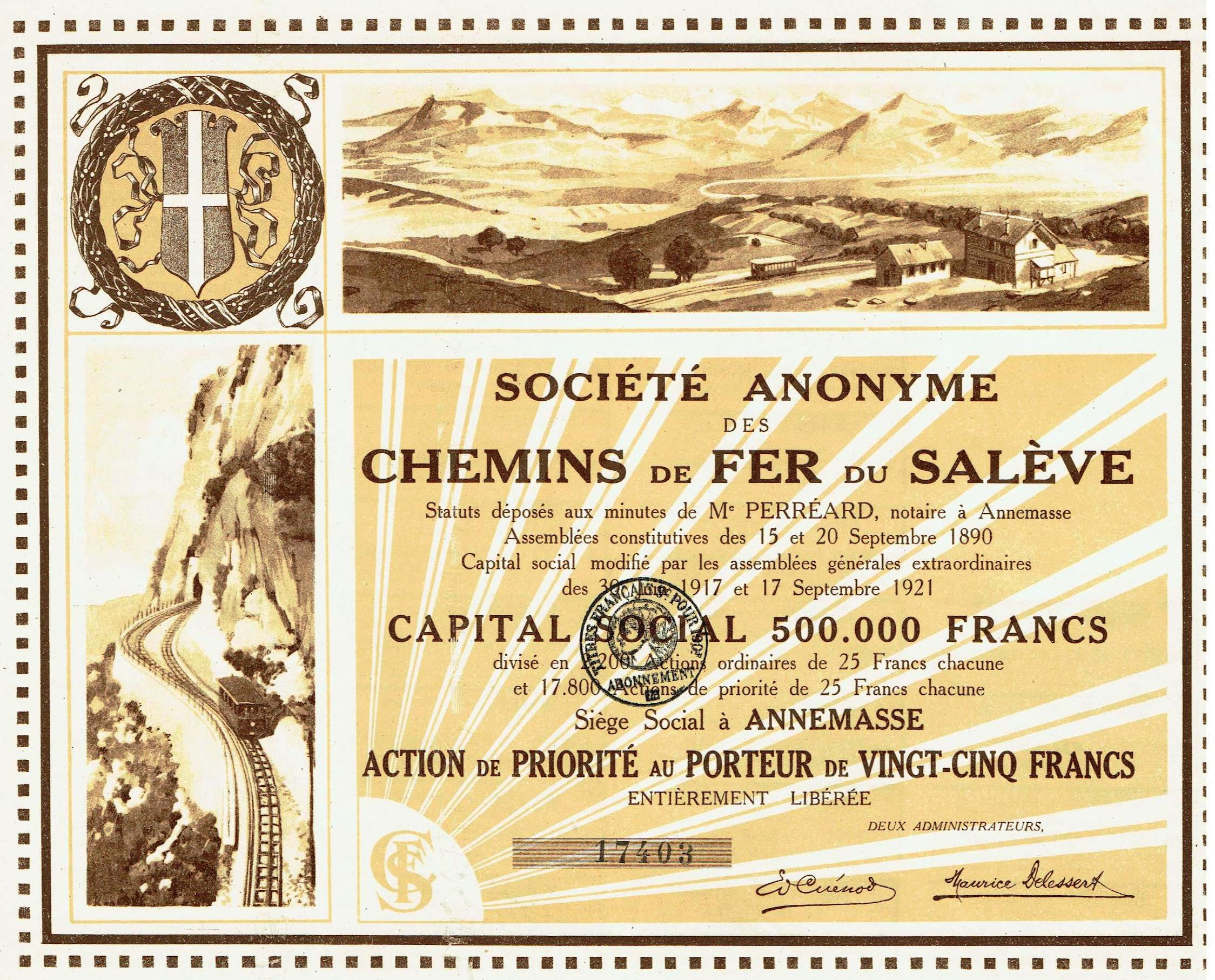
Share of the Chemin de Fer du Salève, issued 17. September 1921

The Chemin de fer du Salève (nicknamed Funiculaire du Salève in spite of the absence of any traction cable), was an electric rack railway that went up the Salève mountain in the French département of Haute-Savoie on the south side of Geneva. In the 1890s, as today, the inhabitants of Geneva enjoyed the view afforded from the Salève of the Jura, the Alps (including the Mont-Blanc) and part of lac Léman, However it was a 3-hour walk up to les Treize Arbres. This was the heyday of local railways in France, and Chemin de fer du Salève came into being in 1892. It continued operations until 1935.

== Construction ==
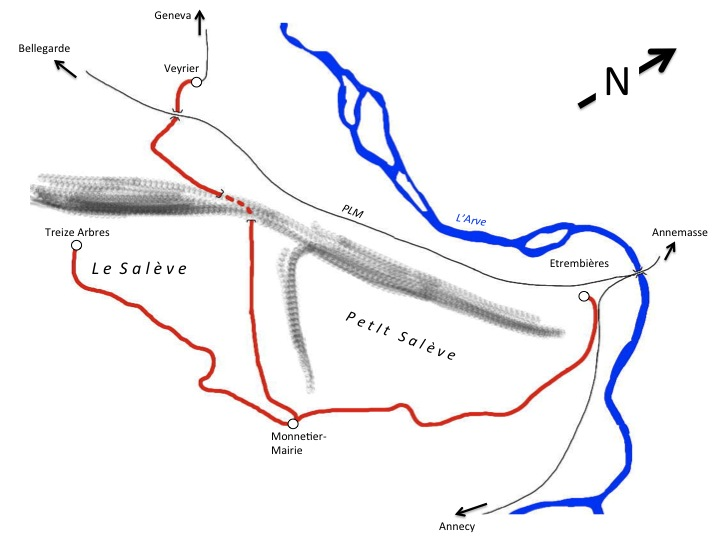
Map of CFS lines

In 1887, a concession was awarded to Messrs Meuron and Cuénod to build a railway from the village of Etrembières to a place known as Treize-Arbres near the summit of the Salève via Mornex and Monnetier. This line was 5.7 km long. A 3 km branch from Veyrier to Monnetier was planned for later.

The Société anonyme des Chemins de fer du Salève (CFS), was founded on 11 September 1890 in Annemasse, and in July of that year, construction began.

On 14 April 1891 the CFS took over the franchise between Etrembières and les Treize-Arbres, which they had initially obtained on 18 June 1888.

The CFS then applied for the franchise between Veyrier and Monnetier-Mornex, which was approved on 9 December 1891

In December 1892, the Etrembières - Treize-Arbres line opened for commercial service as the first all-rack electric railway.

On 24 March 1894, the Veyrier branch was opened, joining the existing line at the Monnetier-Mairie station.

The railway linked to two other railways at its lower termini.

- at Veyrier, to the PLM network, (Annemasse - Bellegarde line) and the Genève-Veyrier railway (Société du chemin de fer Genève - Veyrier)
- at Etrembières, to the Geneva tram network (Annemasse - Etrembières line).

== Operation ==
Both ways up the Salève took one hour. 15 trains were run each way on weekdays and 20 at weekends. Freight services were minimal. Apart from the needs of the railway itself, the only significant customer was the restaurant at the Treize-Arbres station, requiring water, food and firewood.

The CFS was profitable as of 1895, and in 1912 saw its greatest service with 87,000 passengers carried in the year. In 1914, the French-Swiss frontier was closed due to the war, and the Swiss could no longer access the Salève. In 1928, the line still carried 62,000 passengers, but then the decline began. The railway was by now losing money in spite of cost-cutting measures, and the coup de grace came in 1932 with opening of a road (with a bus service) and a cable car up to the summit. In 1935 the CFS was wound up. The following year the rails were dismantled, and in 1938, the franchise revoked.

== Rolling Stock ==
The rolling stock was limited to the minimum required to operate the railway, namely 12 railcars and 6 wagons.

- The railcars were 8.5m long and weighed just over 10t empty, 14.4t when loaded and were able to carry up to 40 passengers between 5.4 and 10.8 km/h thanks to their two 29 kW (40 hp) motors. The chassis were built on 3 axles by Schweizerische Industrie Gesellschaft (SIG) at Neuhausen am Rheinfall, while the electrical equipment was provided by the Ateliers de Sécheron in Geneva. Four shoes (two on each side) picked up the current from the third rail, and tractive force was applied through the rack.

The railcars could brake by reversing the traction current, rheostatic braking, and a mechanical brake.

- The 2-axle goods wagons were used to transport ballast, tools and parts. They were operated by coupling to the railcars on the uphill side. Two of the wagons could be equipped with a tank to hold 1000 or 2000 litres.

== Track ==
The railway used metre gauge (1,000 mm or 3 ft 3 3/8 in) track with a single Abt rack where the gradient was less than 10% and a double rack where the gradient was above 10% up to the ruling maximum of 25%. Normal point were used with mobile rack blades. The power was supplied at 600 V DC to a third rail. The minimum curve radius was 50m.

== Today ==
Some traces of the permanent way are still visible today, the most significant being the tunnel below Monnetier-Mornex. The trackbed above Monnetier-Mornex is walkable for the most part, but below the tunnel (the part which appears in the image of the 1890s has been destroyed by quarrying). The Treize-Arbres and Monnetier-Mairie stations are still visible. The hydroelectric power station at Arthaz, built to provide the electricity is the only part of the CFS which still fulfills its original function, now operated by EDF. The Etrembières depot building is also still standing but altered.

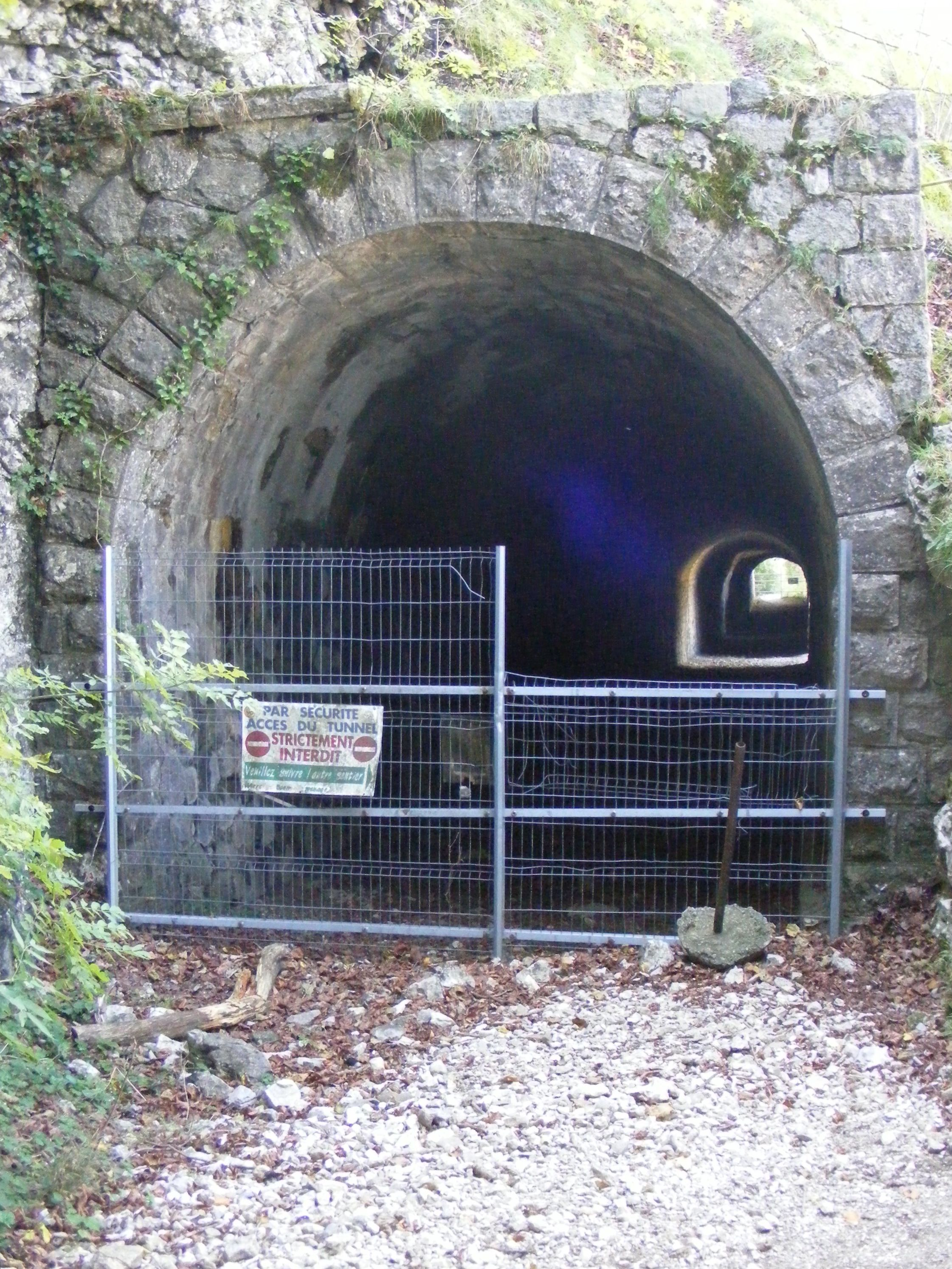
Tunnel du Pas-de-l'Echelle, below Monnetier-Mornex

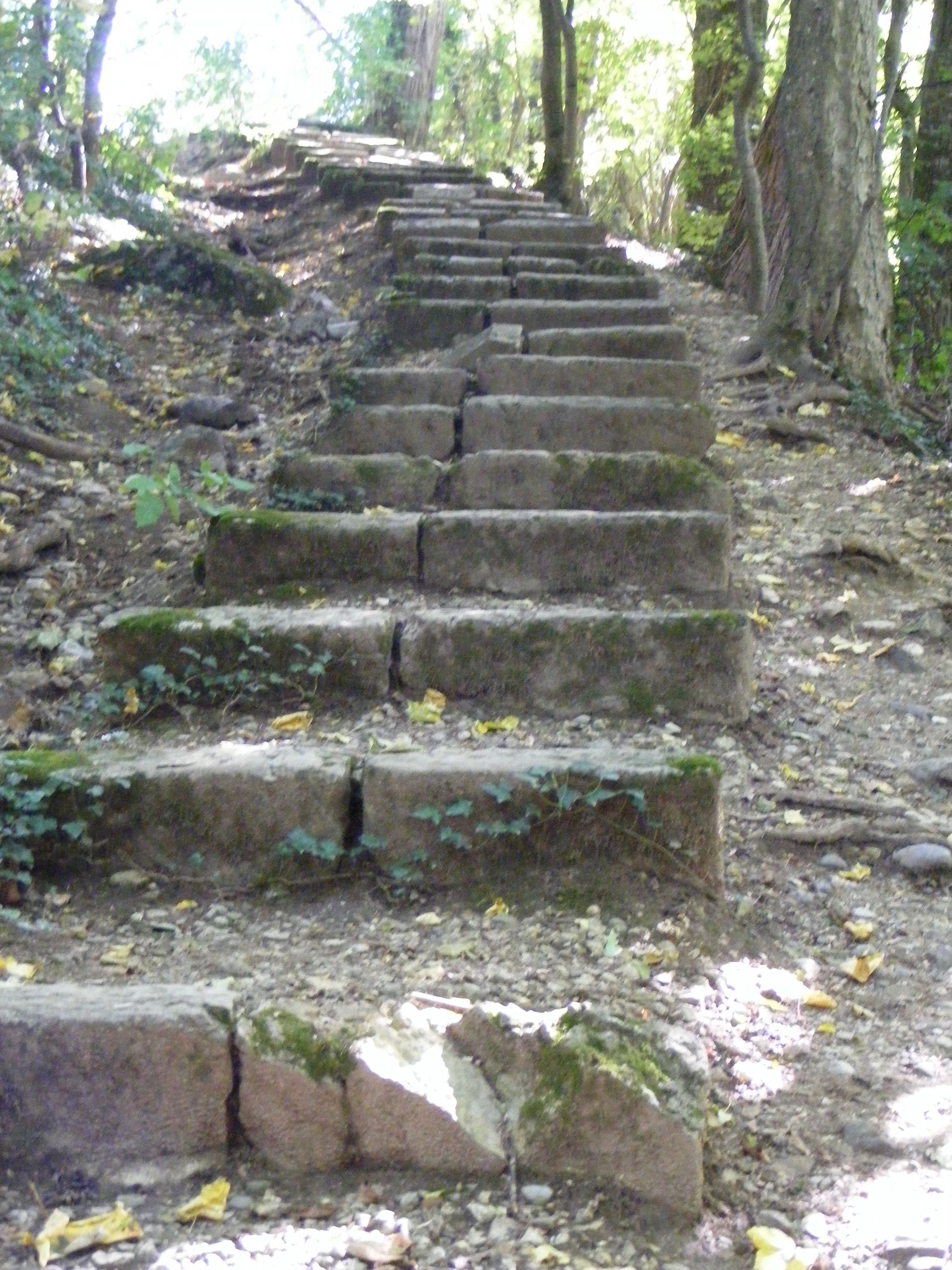
Remains of the 100 steps built by the side of the Veyrier branch between Monnetier-Mornex and the Tunel du Pas de l'Echelle

== Bibliography ==
- Gérard Lepère : « Le chemin de fer à crémaillère du Salève ». Échos saléviens, no. 4, 1994
- Arnaud-Pillonel, Laurence (April 2012). Promenades en Tramway: Genève, Haute-Savoie et Pays de Gex (in French) (1 ed.). Cazouls-lès-Béziers: Editions du Mont. ISBN 978-2-915652-43-7.
- "Trains du Salève". Flickr.
