= Adventist University of France =

University in Auvergne-Rhône-Alpes, France

Coordinates: 46°08′13″N 6°09′29″E

- Campus Adventiste du Salève
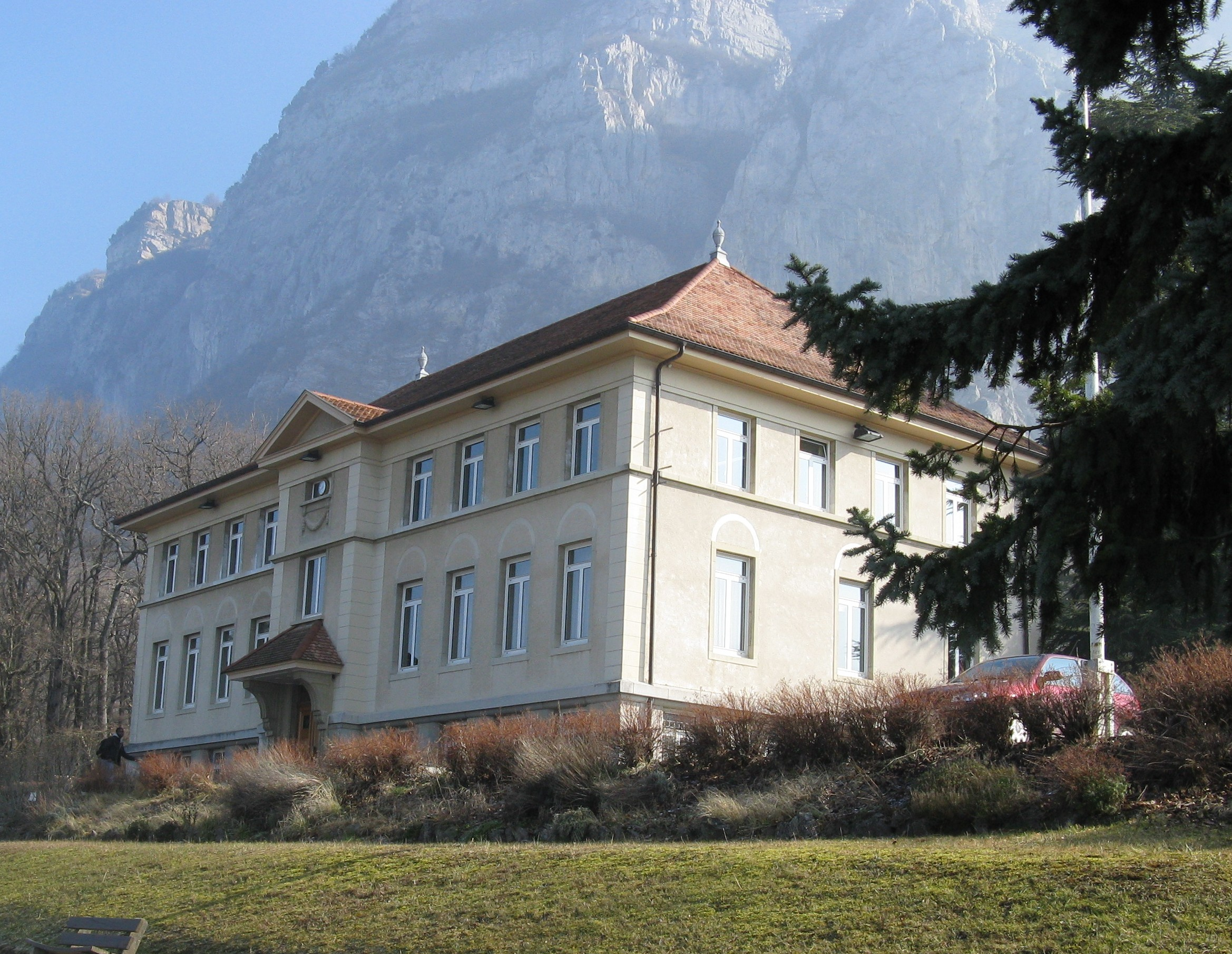
- Motto: Enseigner pour servir
- Motto in English: Teach to serve
- Type: Private
- Established: 1921
- President: Jean-Philippe Lehmann
- Location: Collonges-sous-Saleve, France
- Website: www.campusadventiste.edu

Adventist University of France (French: Campus Adventiste du Salève), formerly named Salève Adventist University, belongs to the Seventh-day Adventist Church and is affiliated with Partnership of Adventist Colleges in Europe (PACE). The university is located about five miles from Geneva across the Swiss-French border. The campus itself is part way up Le Salève, the summit of which is at an elevation of over 1,300 metres (4,300 feet). On the same campus are located schools from kindergarten to senior high school levels.

Collonges-sous-Salève, the village where the campus is located, is situated in the French département of Haute-Savoie, named "Upper Savoy" for its location in the foothills of the Alps mountain range.

== History ==
The first Adventist seminary in Europe was established in Switzerland in 1893. This was transferred to Collonges-sous-Salève in 1921, and took the name of Séminaire Adventiste du Salève (Adventist Seminary of the Saleve). Being the first European Adventist seminary, it contributed to the training of hundreds of pastors in Europe and has sent missionaries around the world. Starting in 1955, the institution offered a 4-year training program. The program is now 5 years long: 3 for the bachelor and 2 more for a master. The name has been changed to Campus Adventiste du Salève (French) or Collonges Adventist University (English).

== Academic divisions ==
The Adventist Theological Seminary is the main teaching faculty at Campus Adventist du Saleve. The French Language Institute is a department of the university that teaches French language and culture to non-native speakers.

The university also offers distance learning courses.

== Alfred Vaucher Library ==
The Alfred Vaucher Library is a resource centre serving:

- The Adventist Theological Seminary
- The French Language Institute
- Maurice-Tièche primary and Comprehensive School

The Library catalogue also integrates the books of four research collections:

- A research centre of the Ellen G. White Estate
- The Historical Files of Adventism in Europe
- The José Figols Research Center
- The Public Affairs and Religious Liberty Centre

== See also ==
- List of Seventh-day Adventist colleges and universities
- Maurice-Tièche Comprehensive School
