= Collonges-sous-Salève =

Collonges-sous-Salève Colonges (Arpitan)
- Commune
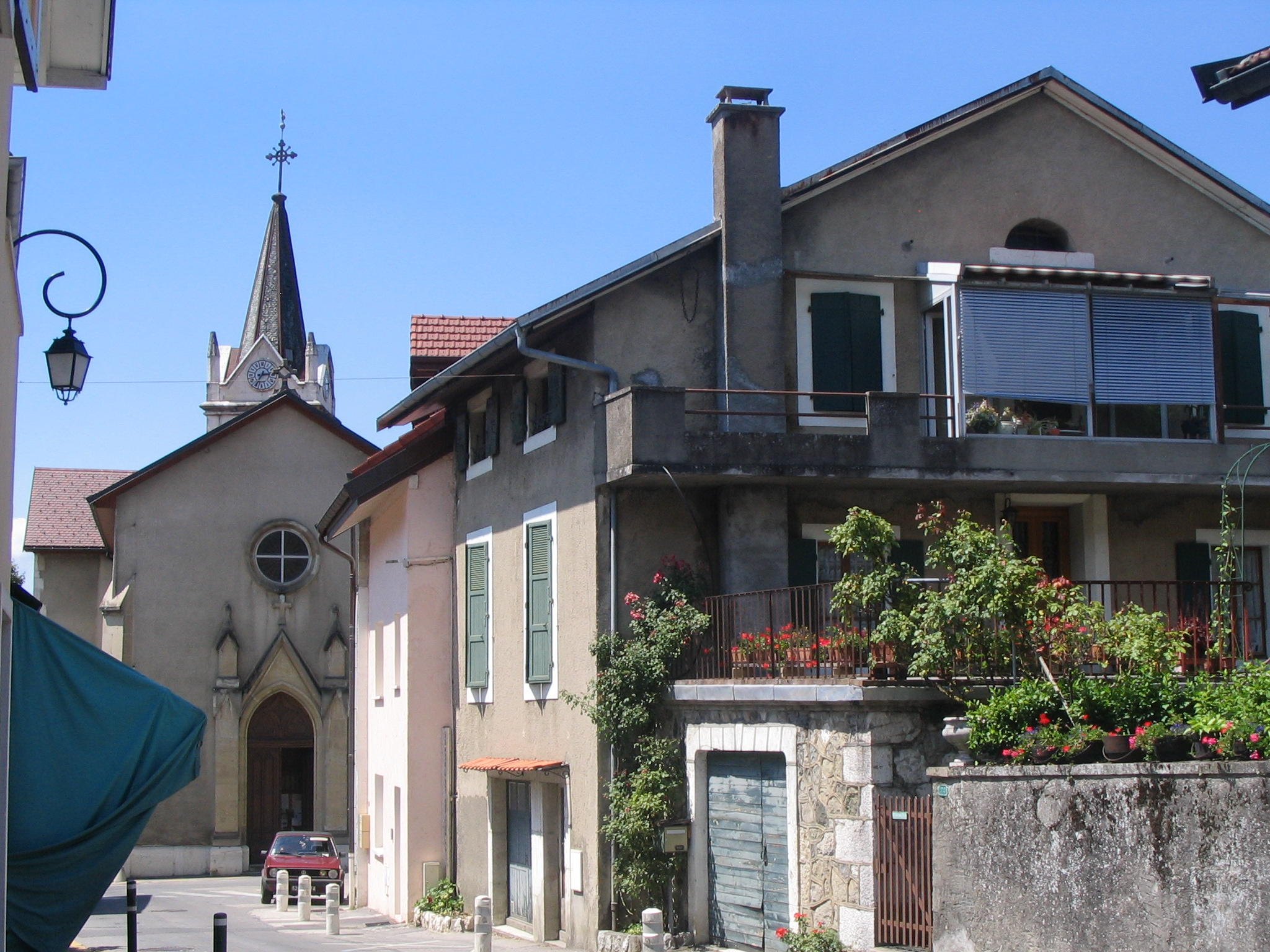
- Saint-Martin church in Collonges-sous-Salève

- Coat of arms
- Location of Collonges-sous-Salève
- Location within France Location within Auvergne-Rhône-Alpes
- Coordinates: 46°08′31″N 6°08′45″E
- Country: France
- Region: Auvergne-Rhône-Alpes
- Department: Haute-Savoie
- Arrondissement: Saint-Julien-en-Genevois
- Canton: Saint-Julien-en-Genevois
- Intercommunality: CC du Genevois

Government
  - Mayor (2022–2026): Vincent Lecaque
- Area^{1}: 6.13 km^{2} (2.37 sq mi)
- Highest elevation: 1,301 m (4,268 ft)
- Lowest elevation: 466 m (1,529 ft)
- Population (2023): 3,832
  - Density: 625/km^{2} (1,620/sq mi)
- Time zone: UTC+01:00 (CET)
  - Summer (DST): UTC+02:00 (CEST)
- INSEE/Postal code: 74082 /74160
- ^{1} French Land Register data, which excludes lakes, ponds, glaciers > 1 km^{2} (0.386 sq mi or 247 acres) and river estuaries.

Collonges-sous-Salève (French pronunciation: [kɔlɔ̃ʒ su salɛv], literally Collonges under Salève; Arpitan: Colonges), popularly known as Collonges, is a commune in the Haute-Savoie department in the Auvergne-Rhône-Alpes region in Eastern France. It is located on the Swiss border, between Geneva to the north and Mont Salève to the south, after which it is named.

== History ==
The name of Collonges (from the Latin colonica) designates a colony of farmers situated on land granted, along with certain liberties, by the land owner. The town dates from the 4th or 5th century. The modern commune has its roots in the Ancien Régime, arising out of a parish whose existence is recorded from the 12th century.

Italian composer Giuseppe Verdi (1813–1901) and singer Giuseppina Strepponi (1815–1897) were married in secret in the parish church of Collonges-sous-Salève, which then laid in the territory of the Kingdom of Piedmont-Sardinia. Collonges-sous-Salève is also the town of origin of the ancestors of French composer Maurice Ravel (1875–1937).

Although the town, as well as Haute Savoie generally, is traditionally Catholic, Collonges-sous-Salève is the location of Adventist University of France – Collonges and Maurice-Tièche comprehensive school, both owned by the Seventh-day Adventist church.

== Population ==
Historical population
Year	Pop.	±% p.a.
1968	1,712	—
1975	2,319	+4.43%
1982	2,519	+1.19%
1990	2,696	+0.85%
1999	3,120	+1.64%
2007	3,569	+1.69%
2012	3,887	+1.72%
2017	3,979	+0.47%
2023	3,832	−0.63%
Source: INSEE

== See also ==
- Communes of the Haute-Savoie department
