= Maurice-Tièche Comprehensive School =

- L’Ensemble Scolaire Maurice-Tièche

Location
- 545 chemin de Bottecreux; 74165 Collonges-sous-Salève; BP 74; France; 46.1359°N 6.1578°E

Information
- School type: Private, Co-educational, Boarding school
- Denomination: Seventh-day Adventist
- Established: 1936
- Founder: Maurice Tièche
- Chairperson: Richard Lehmann
- Principal: Michel Luthringer
- Teaching staff: 23
- Gender: Mixed
- Age: 2 to 18
- Average class size: 20 students
- Language: French
- Sports: Mountain Sports
- Accreditation: Adventist Accrediting Association
- School fees: Years 7 to 10 - €867 (term); Years 11 to 13 - €1024 (term)
- Séries L: 95%
- Séries S: 77%
- Website: www.campusadventiste.edu/en/study/ensemble-scolaire-maurice-tieche/

L’Ensemble Scolaire Maurice-Tièche or Maurice Tièche Comprehensive School is a K-13 co-educational, Christian private school owned by the Seventh-day Adventist Church in the region Collonges-sous-Salève of France. It teaches pupils of primary, junior high and senior high school age. The school also has a nursery school offering care to 2 year-olds. It is a part of the Seventh-day Adventist education system, the world's second largest Christian school system.

== History ==
The Maurice-Tièche primary school was founded in 1936 by Maurice Tièche, a graduate from the historic University of Paris (commonly referred to as La Sorbonne). In October 1946, the first year 7 (6ème) class was opened. In October 1948, the rest of the junior high school was opened and the school was renamed Le Cours Complémentaire du Séminaire Adventiste. In 1953, the junior high school became a secondary school under the name le Cours Secondaire. Over 100 pupils were enrolled at that time. In 1973, the secondary school adopted the name Cours Privé Maurice Tièche, then some years later, it became Lycée Privé Maurice Tièche.

The primary and secondary schools merged into a combined school in 2003 which is now known as Ensemble Scolaire Maurice Tièche.

== Facilities ==
Pupils at the school have access to Bibliothèque Alfred Vaucher (Alfred Vaucher Library) which it shares with the Saleve Adventist University.

The Section Etudes et Sports de Montagne (Studies and Mountain Sports section) of the school allows pupils to combine their high school studies and their passion for mountain sports. Preparatory classes start at year 9 but it is possible for students to take up the cycle in senior high school.

== Academics ==
The school has three Baccalauréat général streams in which students can specialise in:

- S Scientifique (sciences)
- ES Sciences économiques et sociales (economics and social sciences)
- L littéraire (literature)

Since 2002, the pass rate for the Baccalauréat scientifique (Sciences) stream has been around 77% while in the littéraire (literature) stream, is around 95%.

The students in première (Year 12) and terminale (Year 13) are generally in classes of 12 in each of their respective streams. In certain subjects such as French where the programme is joint, students come together to form classes of a maximum of 24 students. This allows teachers to track individual students and address many of their questions.

== See also ==
- List of Seventh-day Adventist secondary and elementary schools
- Seventh-day Adventist education
- Seventh-day Adventist Church
- Seventh-day Adventist theology
- History of the Seventh-day Adventist Church
- List of schools in France
- Saleve Adventist University
