= Téléphérique du Salève =

Passenger cable car

Coordinates: 46°09′46″N 6°11′21″E

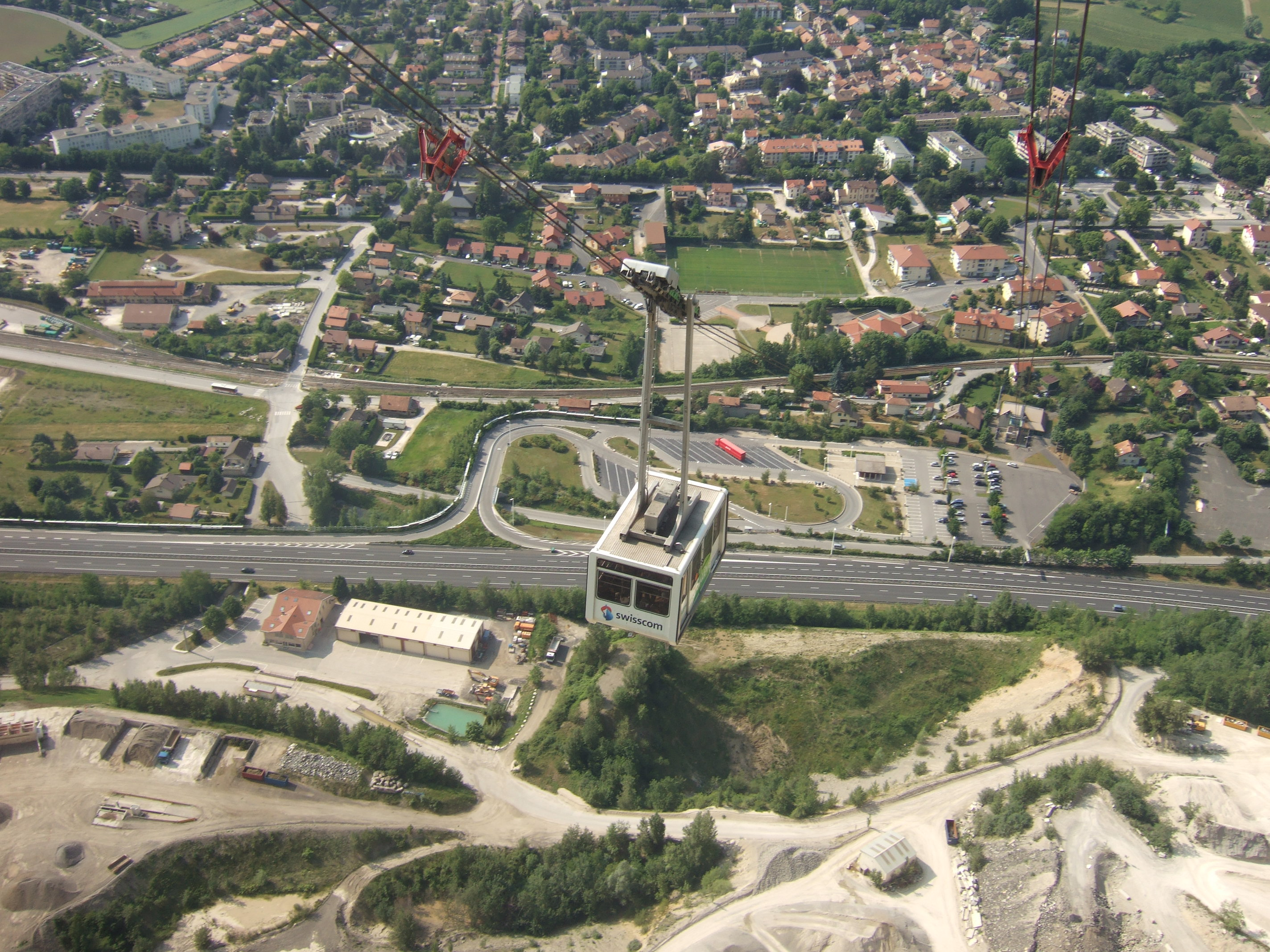
View from the descending car towards the base station

The Téléphérique du Salève is a passenger cable car providing access to the top of the Salève in Haute-Savoie, France, overlooking the city of Geneva, Switzerland. The cable car is operated by a joint venture between RATP (through its subsidiary RATP Dev), Transports Publics Genevois, and COMAG (a subsidiary of lift manufacturer Poma).

== History ==
The cable car was inaugurated in 1932, replacing a now-disused rack railway, for which one of the tunnels can still be seen walking up. Delayed from 2020 due to the COVID-19 pandemic, It was shut down from 2021 to 2023 for refurbishment. The projected cost is 12 million euros.

== Features ==
The base station in Étrembières is at an altitude of 432m, while the top station at 1097m. The cable car climbs very steeply due to the near-vertical face of the ridge, with an ascension of 665m in an overall length of 1172m.

The cabins can hold up to 60 people each.
