= Alfred Vaucher =

Italian theologian (1887–1993)

Alfred-Felix Vaucher

Personal details
- Born: March 18, 1887 Luserna San Giovanni, Italy
- Died: May 22, 1993 (aged 106) Gland, Switzerland
- Occupation: Protestant, Seventh-day Adventist Theologian

Alfred-Felix Vaucher (March 18, 1887 – May 22, 1993) was an Italian theologian, church historian, and bibliographer. He was a pioneer in the history and study of Seventh-day Adventism.

Preaching his first sermon at age 14, Vaucher studied at a church in Paris. In 1903, he was engaged by the Adventist church, to which he devoted an active ministry of approximately eighty years.

Vaucher traveled around Europe, including Switzerland and Italy as a Seventh-day Adventist evangelist. He published over 1,100 articles and pamphlets on French church history and wrote a score of books, some of which are: L'Histoire du Salut, Le P. Manuel Lacunza y Diaz, L'Antichrist, Le Jour du Repos, and Le Jour Seigneurial. Vaucher also taught at Salève Adventist University, Collonges-sous-Salève, Haute-Savoie, a French biblical college, from 1921 to 1941 and 1945–1983.

He died at age 106.

== Bibliography ==
- Vaucher, A. (1949). Une celebrite oubliee: Le P. Manuel de Lacunza y Diaz (1731-1801) de la Societe de Jesus, auteur de "La venue du Messie en gloire et majeste." Collonges-sous-Salève: Imprimerie Fides.
- Vaucher, A. (1951). L'Histoire du salut (3e éd.). Dammarie-les-Lys (S.-et-M.): Éditions S.D.T.
- Vaucher, A. (1960). L'Antichrist. Collonges-sous-Salève: Imprimerie Fides.
- Vaucher, A. (1962). Le jour du repos. Collonges-sous-Salève: Imprimerie Fides.
- Vaucher, A. (1970). Le jour seigneurial. Collonges-sous-Salève: Imprimerie Fides.
