= Salève =

Mountain in France

Mont Salève
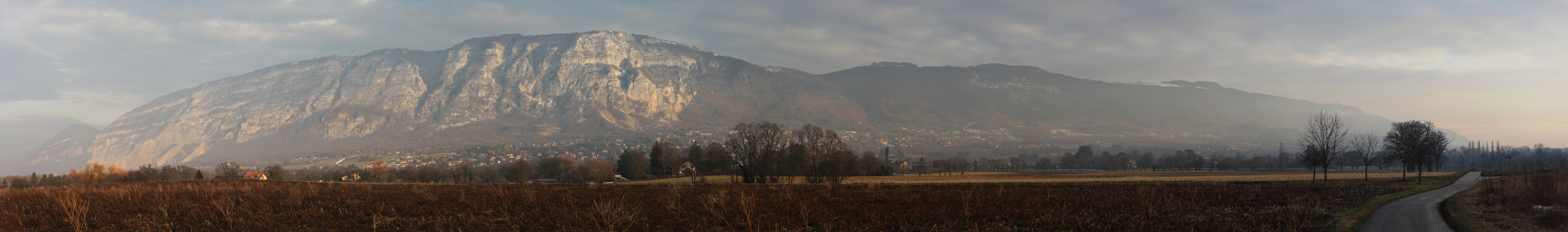
- View of the Salève

Highest point
- Elevation: 1,379 m (4,524 ft)
- Prominence: 578 m (1,896 ft)
- Coordinates: 46°05′39″N 6°08′25″E

Geography
- Location within Alps Location within France
- Location: Haute-Savoie, Auvergne-Rhône-Alpes, France
- Parent range: French Prealps

Geology
- Rock age: Jurassic to Cretaceous

The Salève (French pronunciation: [salɛv]), or Mont Salève, is a mountain of the French Prealps located in the department of Haute-Savoie in Auvergne-Rhône-Alpes. It is also called the "Balcony of Geneva" (French: Balcon de Genève).

== Geography ==
Geographically, the Salève is a mountain of the French Prealps located in the Haute-Savoie department, but geologically a part of the Jura chain, as the Vuache is. Below the Salève is the Geneva urban area where more than 700,000 people live.

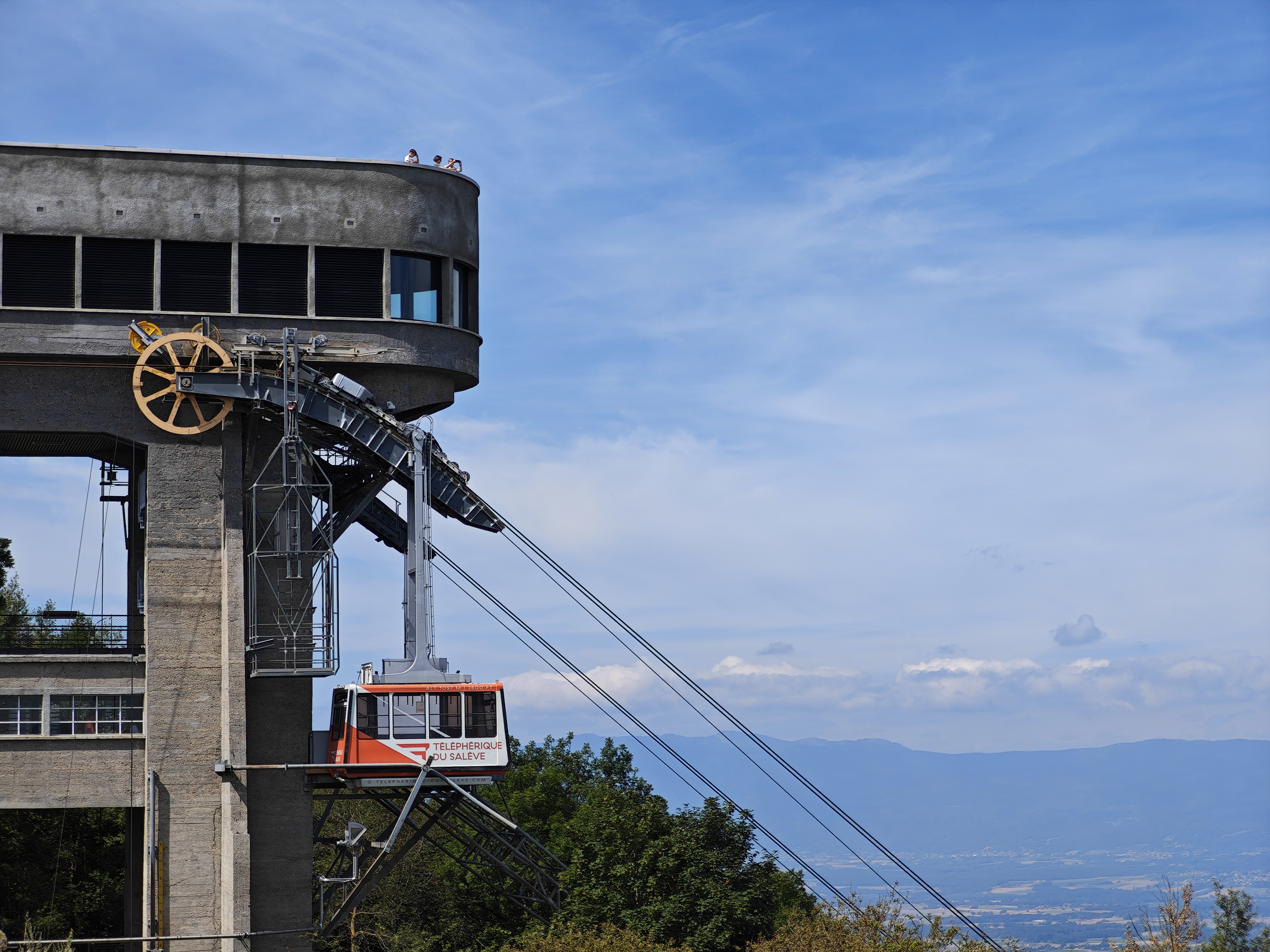
Upper station of the Téléphérique du Salève

The Salève consists of the Pitons, Grand Salève and Petit Salève; it culminates at 1,379 metres at the Grand Piton. It is accessible via the Téléphérique du Salève, a cable car, since 1932 (rebuilt in 1983). The Salève stretches between Étrembières in the north and the suspension bridge of La Caille in the south. Between 1892 and 1935, the Salève was served by the first electric rack railway in the world (Chemin de fer du Salève).

The eastern side of the Salève dives under the molasse of the Bornes Massif while the abrupt mountain slope facing Geneva is subject to erosion. The vegetation – or the absence thereof – enhances the limestone's layers. This side of the mountain is slit by several narrow and deep gorges, among which the Grande Varappe, which at the end of the 19th century gave its name to the activity of rock climbing in French. This discipline developed intensely there, at a time when it was only beginning.

The Monnetier Valley, separating the Petit and Grand Salève, is due to glaciary erosion. Modern geologists now think that this valley was dug by the subglaciary currents in a fissured region between the Petit and Grand Salève and not by the Arve as was assumed earlier.

== From prehistory to green tourism ==
Between 12,000 and 10,000 BC, the Salève hosted a magdalenian site. From 1833, Genevan physician François Isaac Mayor, then Minister Taillefer, as well as dentist Thoily explored the mountain's past. The cliff near Veyrier turned out to be a prehistoric shelter. Bones (partridge, reindeer, horse, marmot amongst others), flint and engraved wood were found in dozens of places including caves, shelters and settlements. There was a dolmen at Aiguebelle.

Between the Neolithic and the Bronze Age, the settlements became more sedentary (Bossey, Chaffardon). An oppidum was erected on the Petit Salève around 1000 BC.

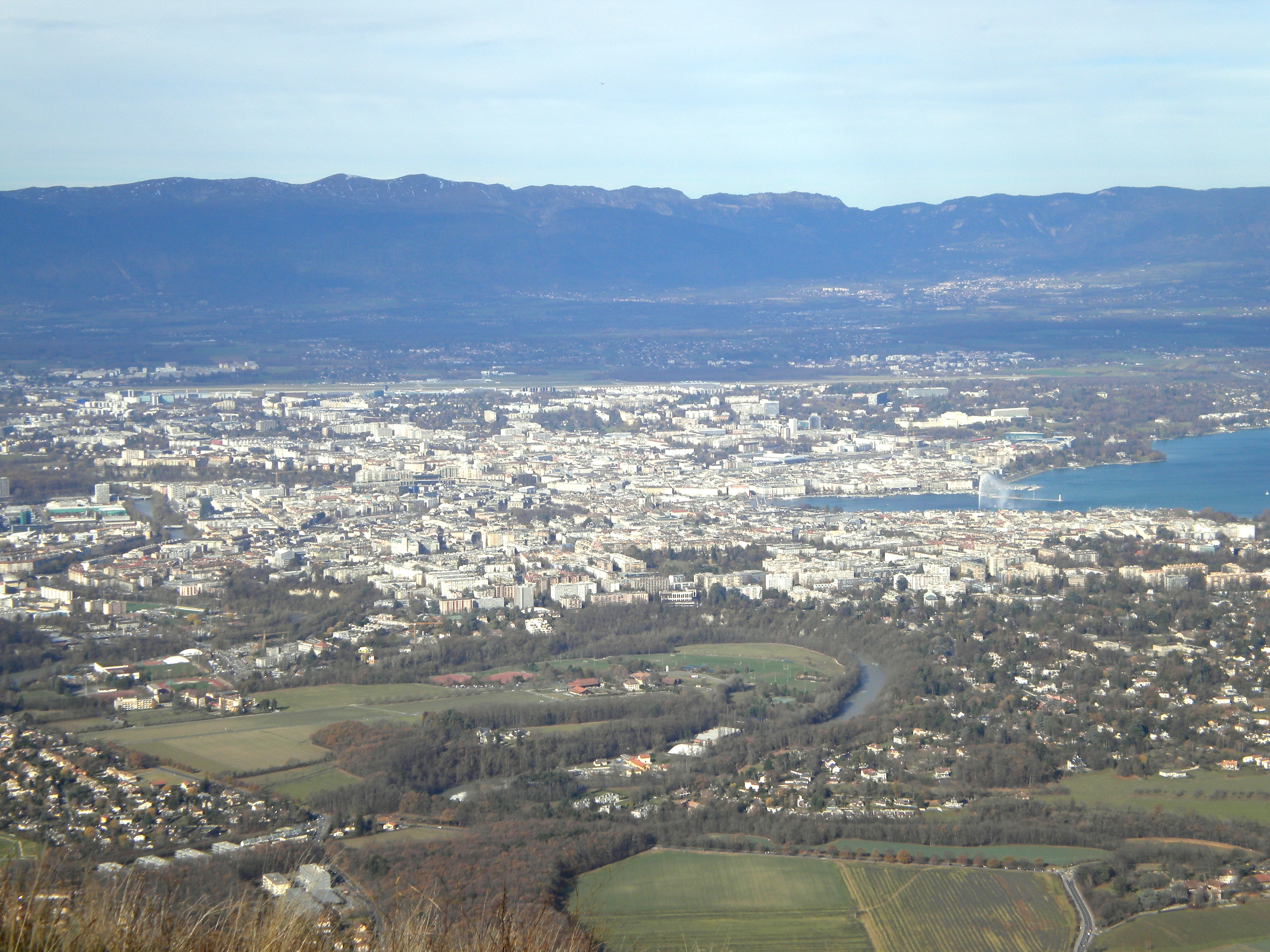
View on Geneva and the Jura mountains from the arrival of the cable car

The Salève offers a panorama over the Geneva agglomeration, Lake Geneva, the south of the Jura Mountains, the Prealps, Lake Annecy and Mont Blanc.

== "Syndicat mixte du Salève" and "Maison du Salève" ==
The "Syndicat mixte du Salève" was created in 1994 and regroups the twenty communes on whose ground the Salève is located. Its objective is to appreciate and protect the mountain which is a "preserved island" in the middle of a French-Suisse territory that is highly urbanized with more than 700.000 inhabitants.

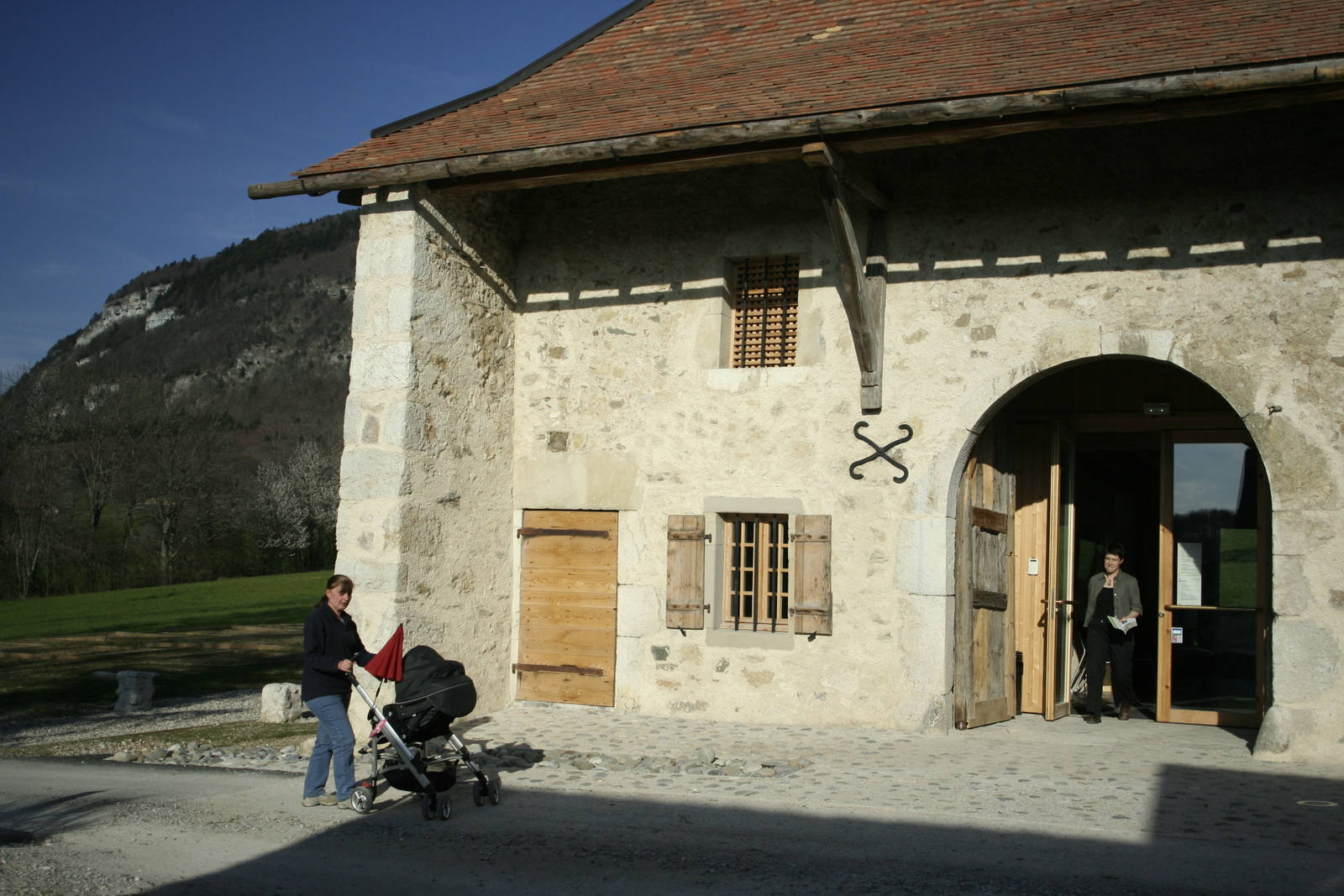
Maison du Salève

The syndicat opened the "Maison du Salève" in September 2007 in an ancient Mikerne farm house dating from 1733. This documentation center presents all aspects of the mountain: its history, patrimony, nature, sports and leisure. In the same year, it developed a charter for sustainable development of the Salève trying to reconcile the conservation of the massif with its increasing frequentation with a vision on 30 years. The "Maison du Salève" hosts a permanent exposition, temporary exhibitions as well as guided tours, excursions and conferences about the local patrimony and the environment.

The syndicat involves in its three work groups - agriculture, tourism and leisure, access and transportation - all users of the Salève, meaning communes, sport clubs, environment protection associations, restorations, farmers, hunters, as well as tourism offices amongst others.

== Tibetan temple ==
Shedrub Choekhor Ling is a centre of Tibetan Buddhism on the Salève. It is under the direction of the Sangha sur Salève association. The monastery opened its doors to public in September 2010. It has deck open for public from where the Jura mountains can be seen as the backdrop of Geneva. Visitors can watch the monks performing daily rituals and prayers inside the monastery and can buy Buddhist and Tibetan handicrafts, decorative items, books and jewellery from the store in the monastery.

== The Salève in literature ==
- In Frankenstein by Mary Shelley, the creature after having fled climbs up the Salève (Chapter 7).

It was echoed from Saleve, the Juras, and the Alps of Savoy; vivid flashes of lightning dazzled my eyes, illuminating the lake, making it appear like a vast sheet of fire; then for an instant everything seemed of a pitchy darkness, until the eye recovered itself from the preceding flash.

I thought of pursuing the devil; but it would have been in vain, for another flash discovered him to me hanging among the rocks of the nearly perpendicular ascent of Mont. Saleve, a hill that bounds Plainpalais on the south.

Who could arrest a creature capable of scaling the overhanging sides of Mont Saleve?

- The Dedicace to the Last song of Harold's Pilgrimage, proposed by Lamartine in 1825 as the conclusion of his friend Lord Byron's uncompleted poem, is located on the Salève. Byron died in 1824. (See the French page for the complete "Dedicace").

Te souviens-tu du jour où gravissant la cime
Du Salève aux flancs azurés,
Dans un étroit sentier qui pend sur un abîme
Nous posions en tremblant nos pas mal assurés? [...]

- "Le Ruisseau" is a poem by Théophile Gautier located on the foot of the Salève (1869). (See the French page for the complete poem).

Du creux de la roche moussue
La petite source jaillit.
Du Grand-Salève elle est issue
Et deux brins d’herbe font son lit. [...]

== The Salève in paintings ==
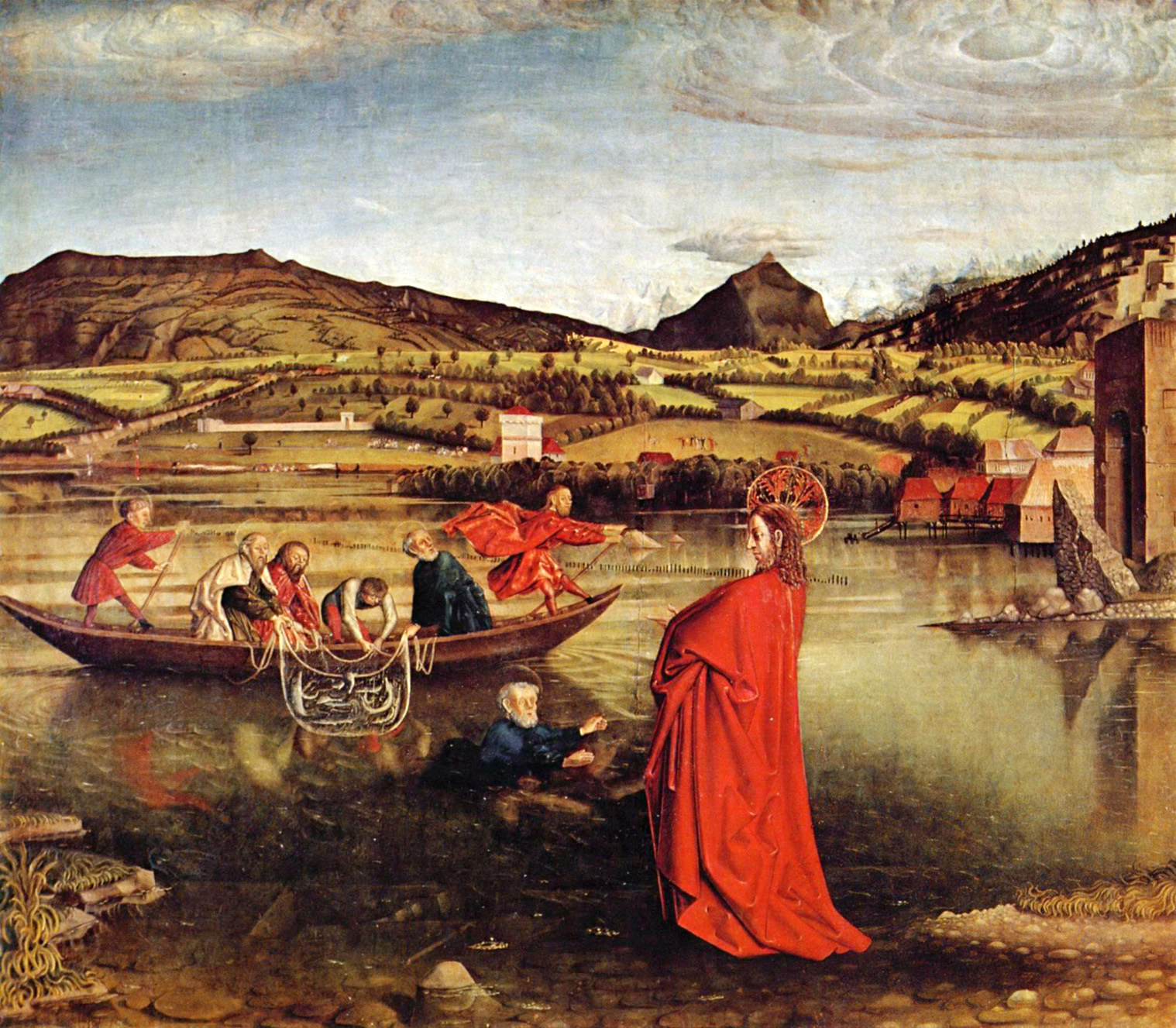
La Pêche Miraculeuse by Konrad Witz with, in the background, the Salève and Le Môle as seen from Geneva.

The Salève occurs on one of the first European paintings depicting a realistic landscape, La Pêche Miraculeuse by Konrad Witz created in 1444.

== Gallery ==
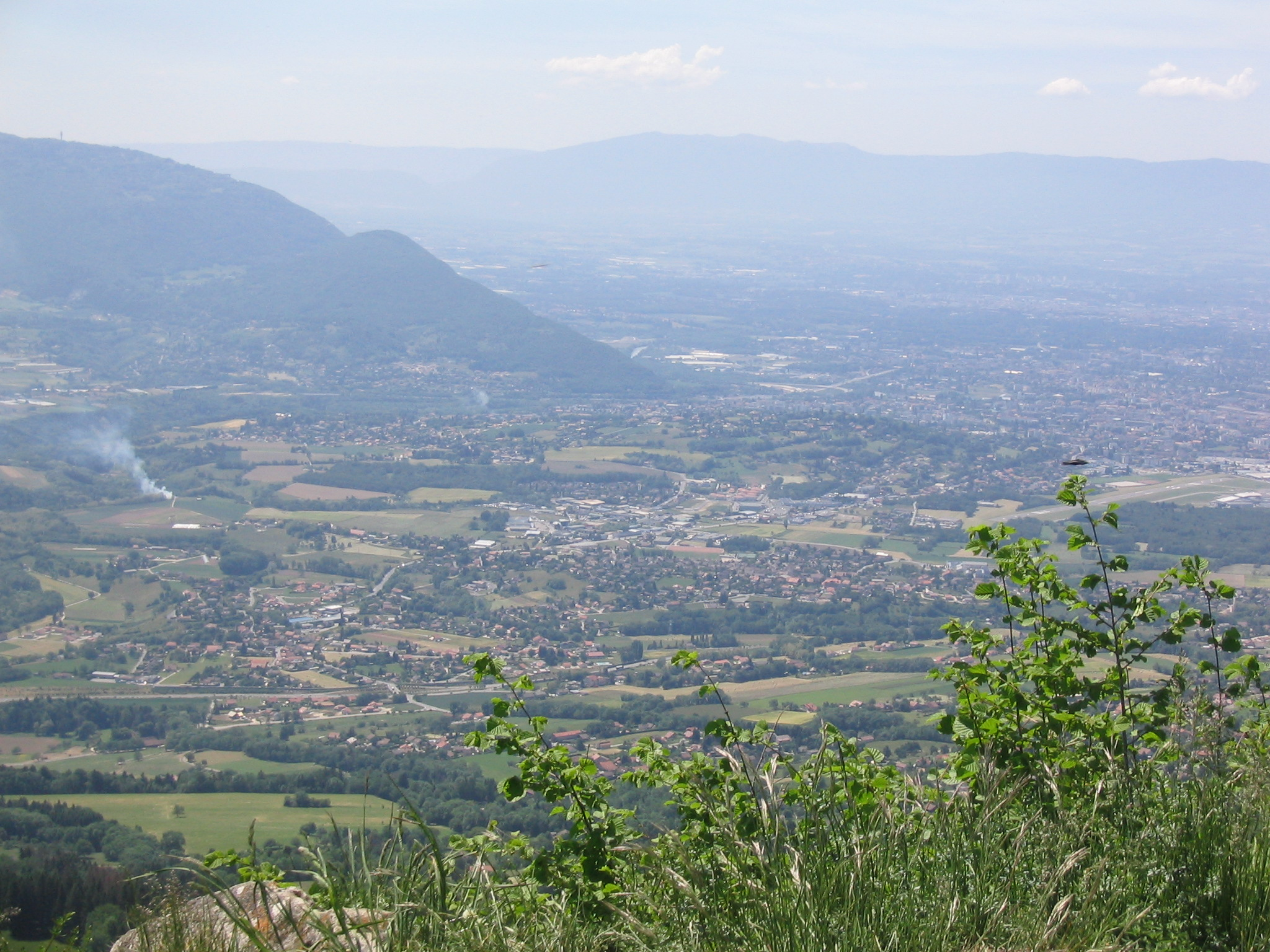
The Salève (left) and the agglomeration of Annemasse

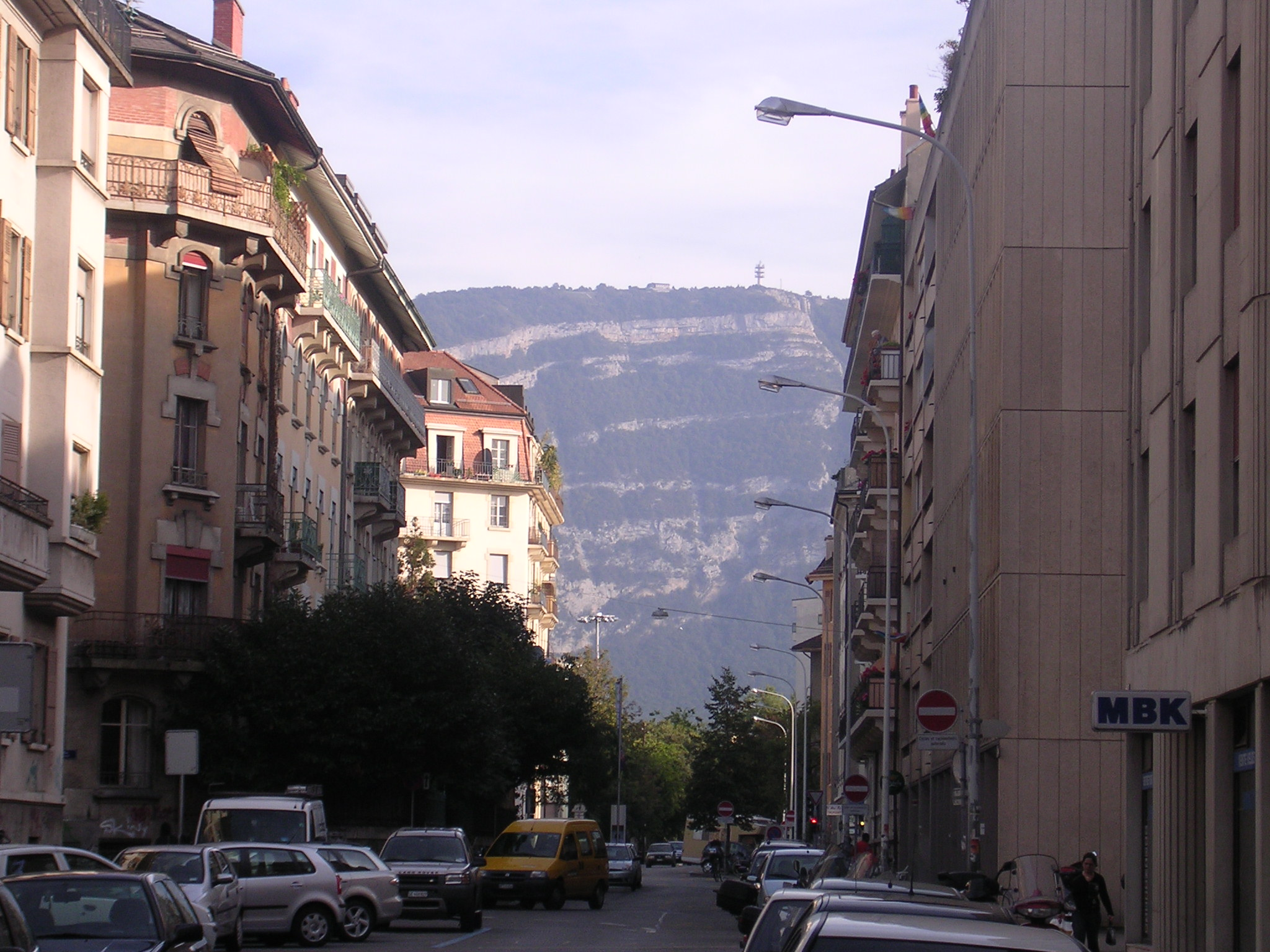
The Salève seen from Geneva

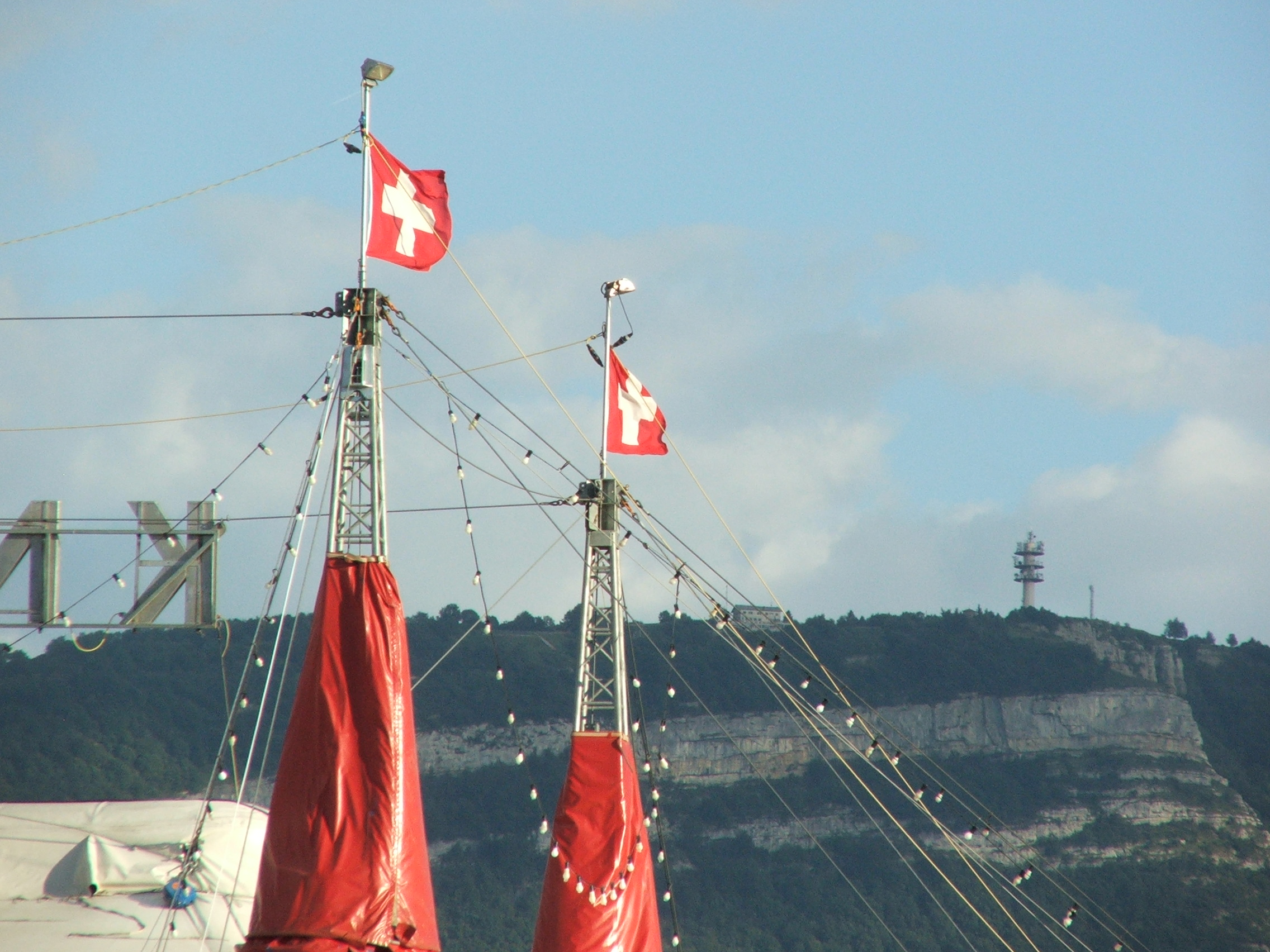
The Salève seen from the Plaine de Plainpalais in Geneva

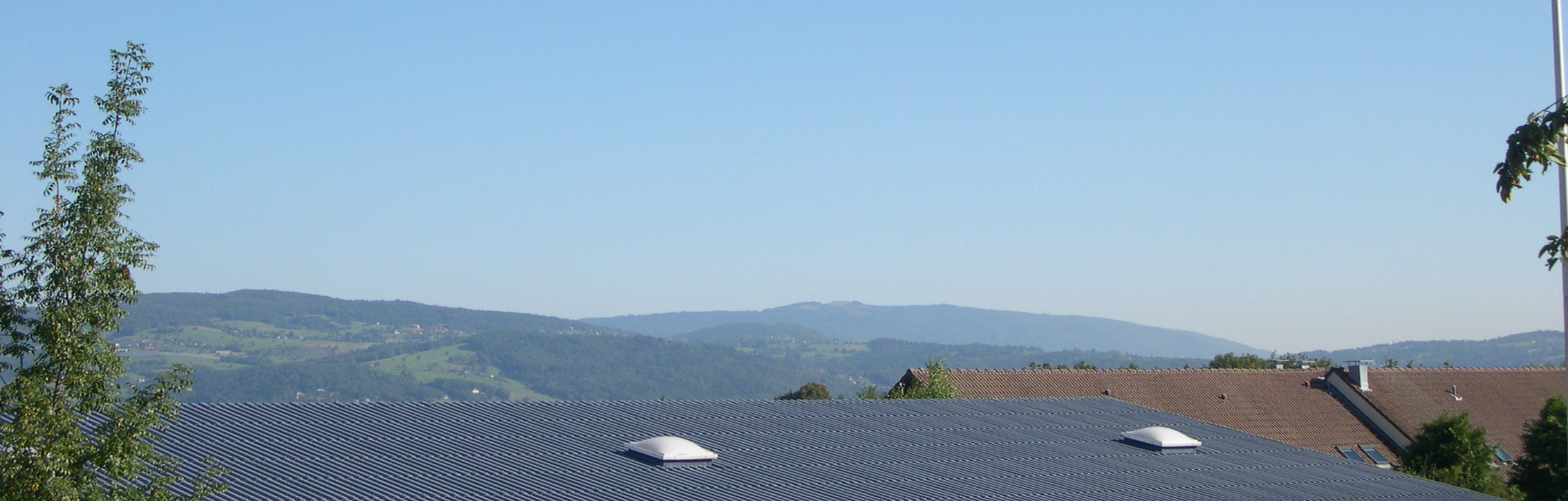
The Salève seen from Annecy

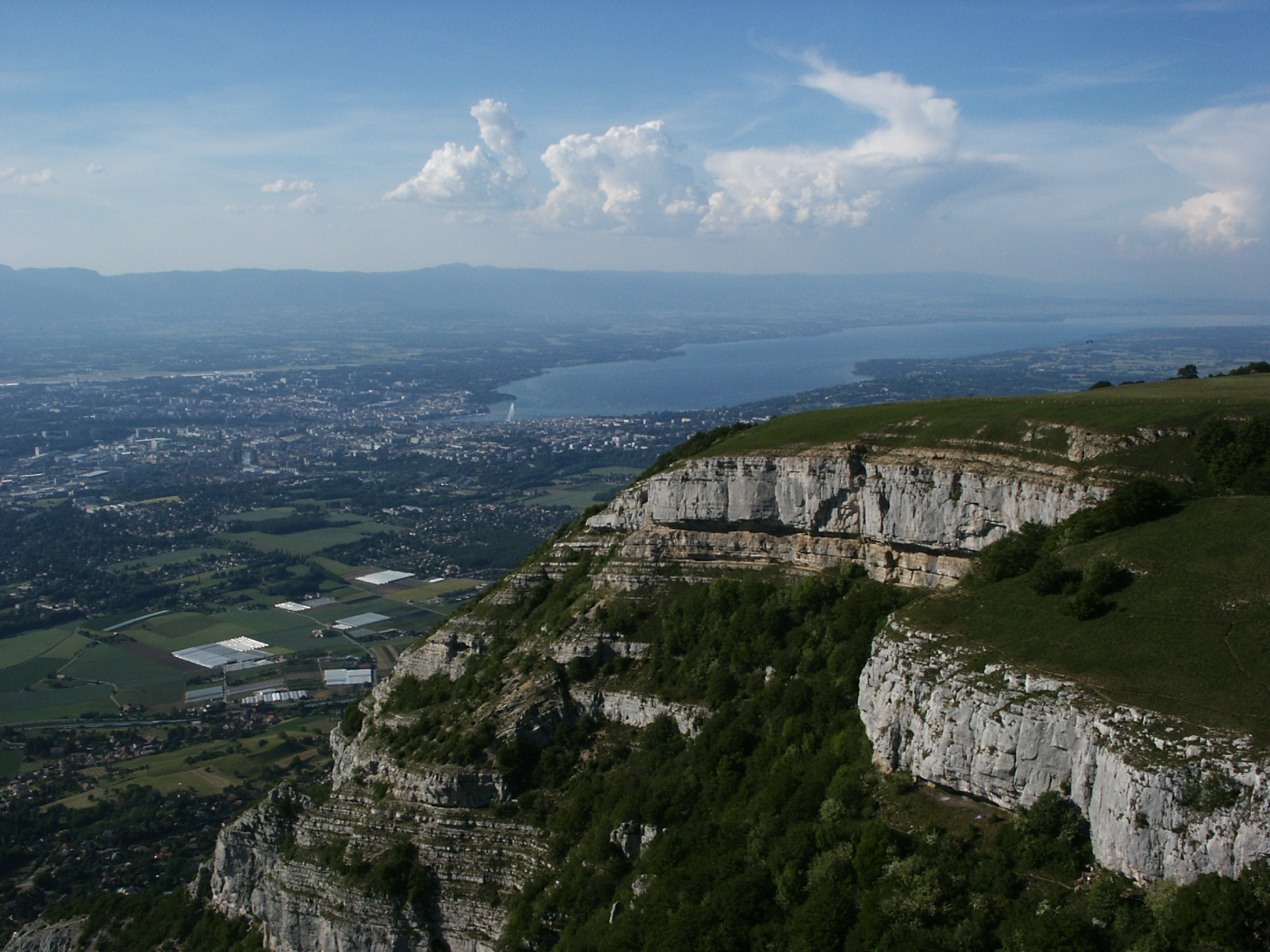
Aerial view on the Salève and Geneva, its Jet d'Eau, Lake Geneva and the Jura Mountains in the background

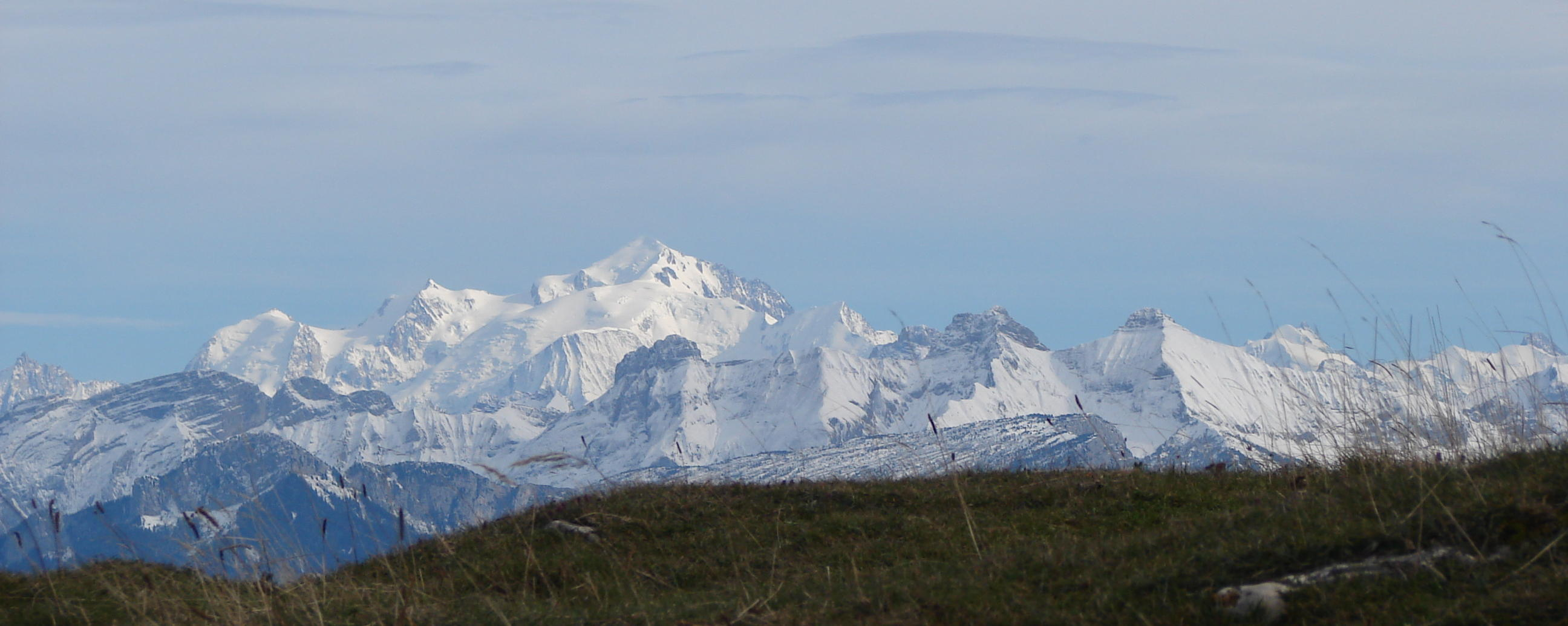
Mont Blanc from the summit of the Salève

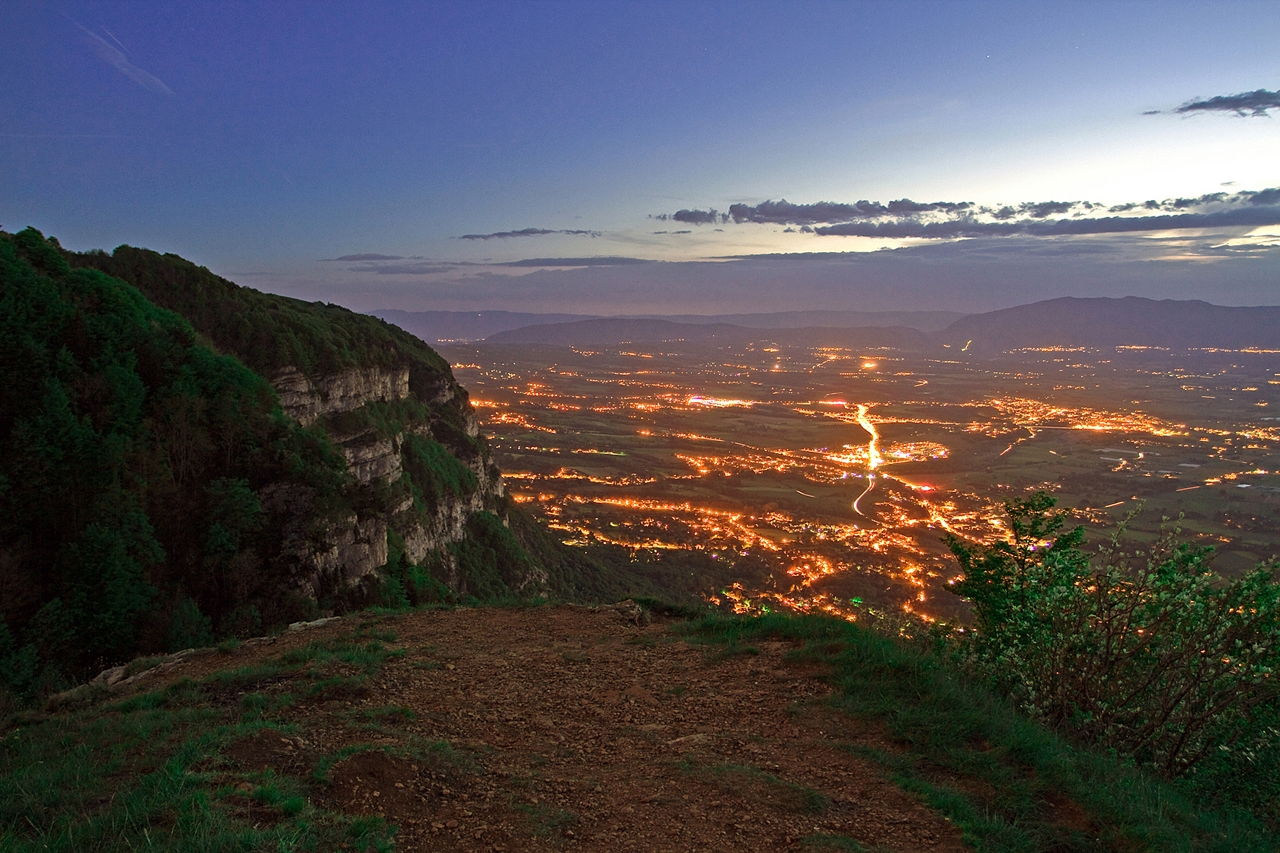
Night view on Saint-Julien-en-Genevois from the Salève

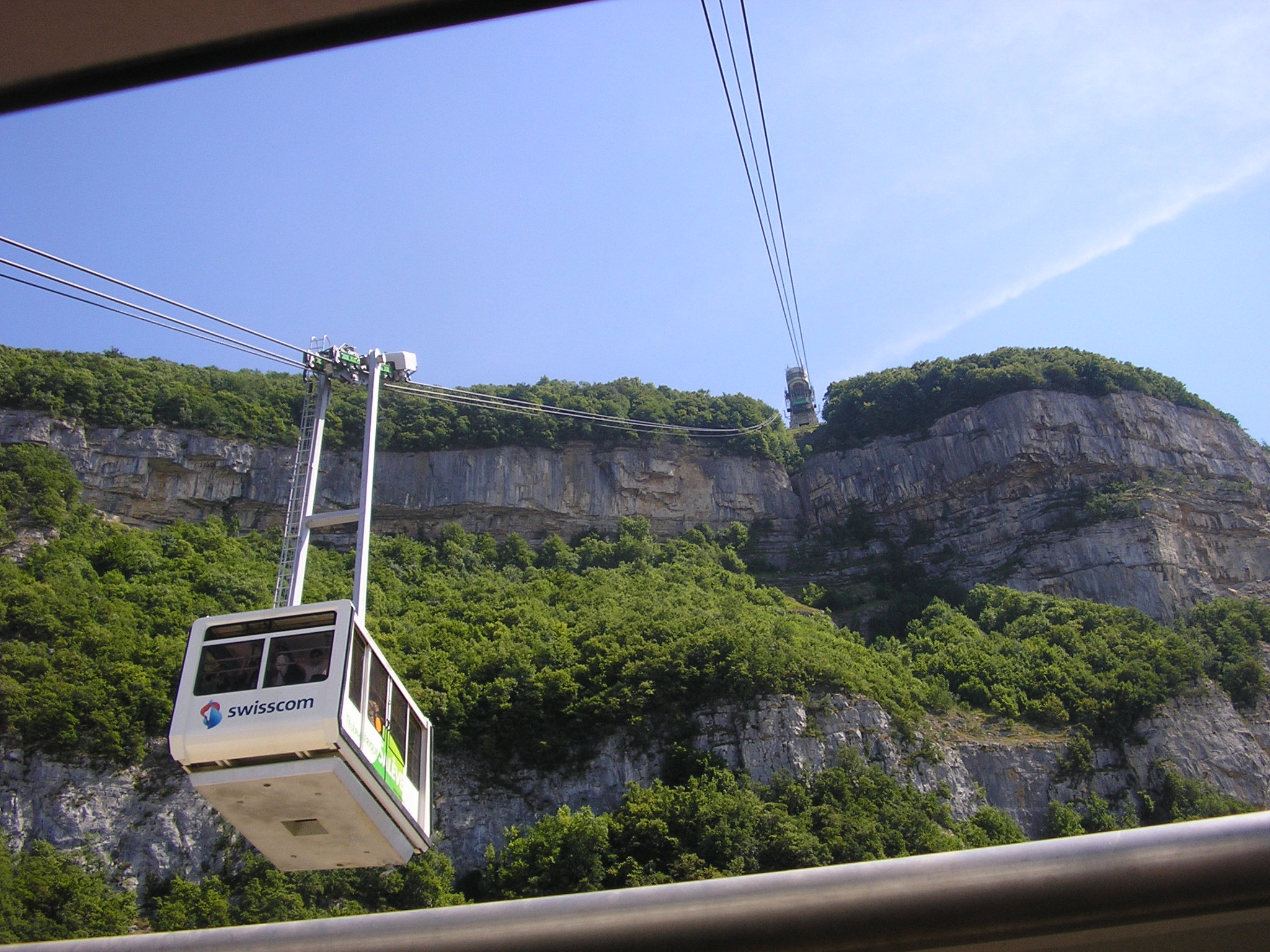
The Téléphérique du Salève (cable car of the Salève)

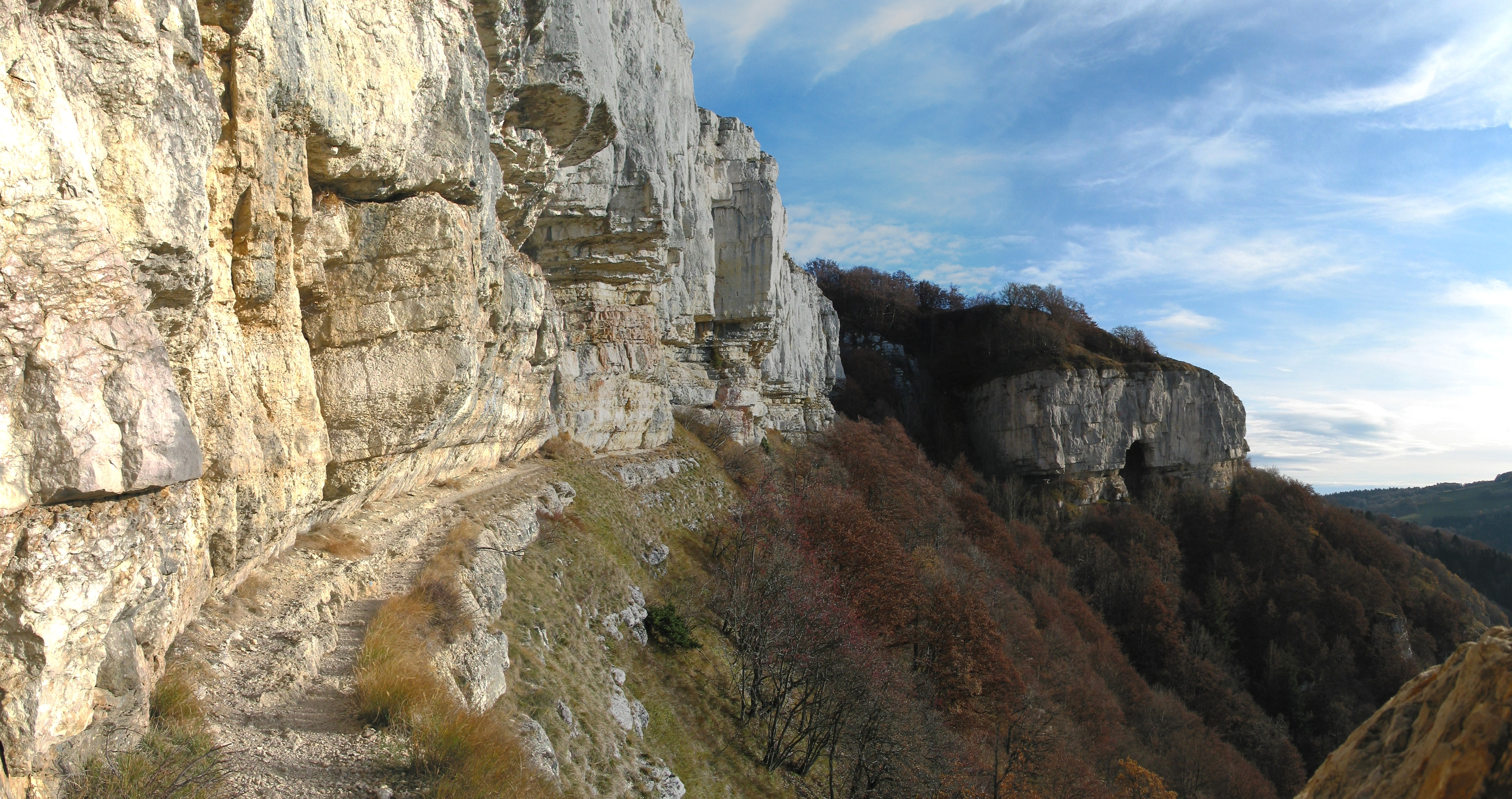
Corraterie and Trou de la Tine at the Salève

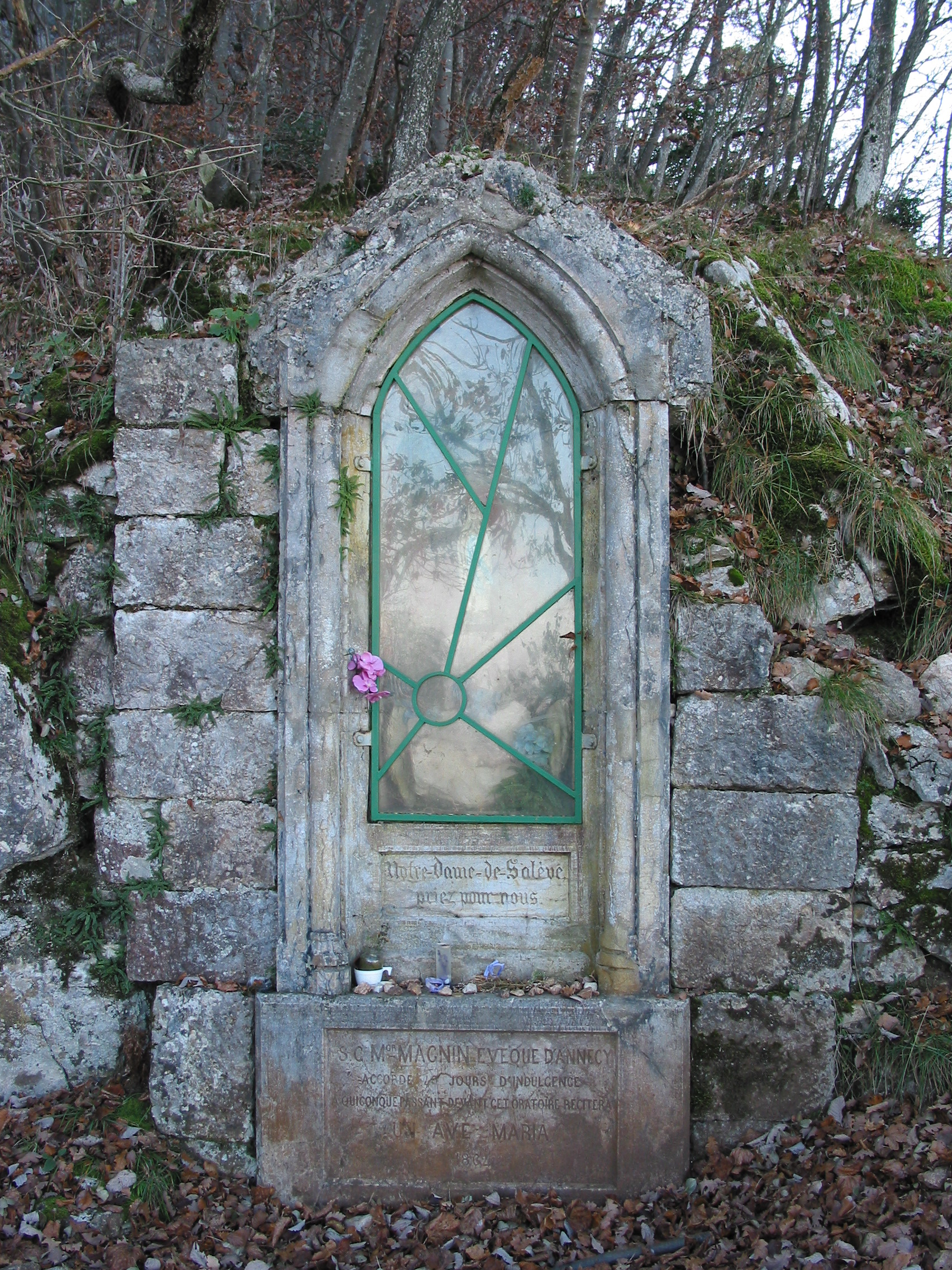
Oratory of Notre-Dame of the Salève

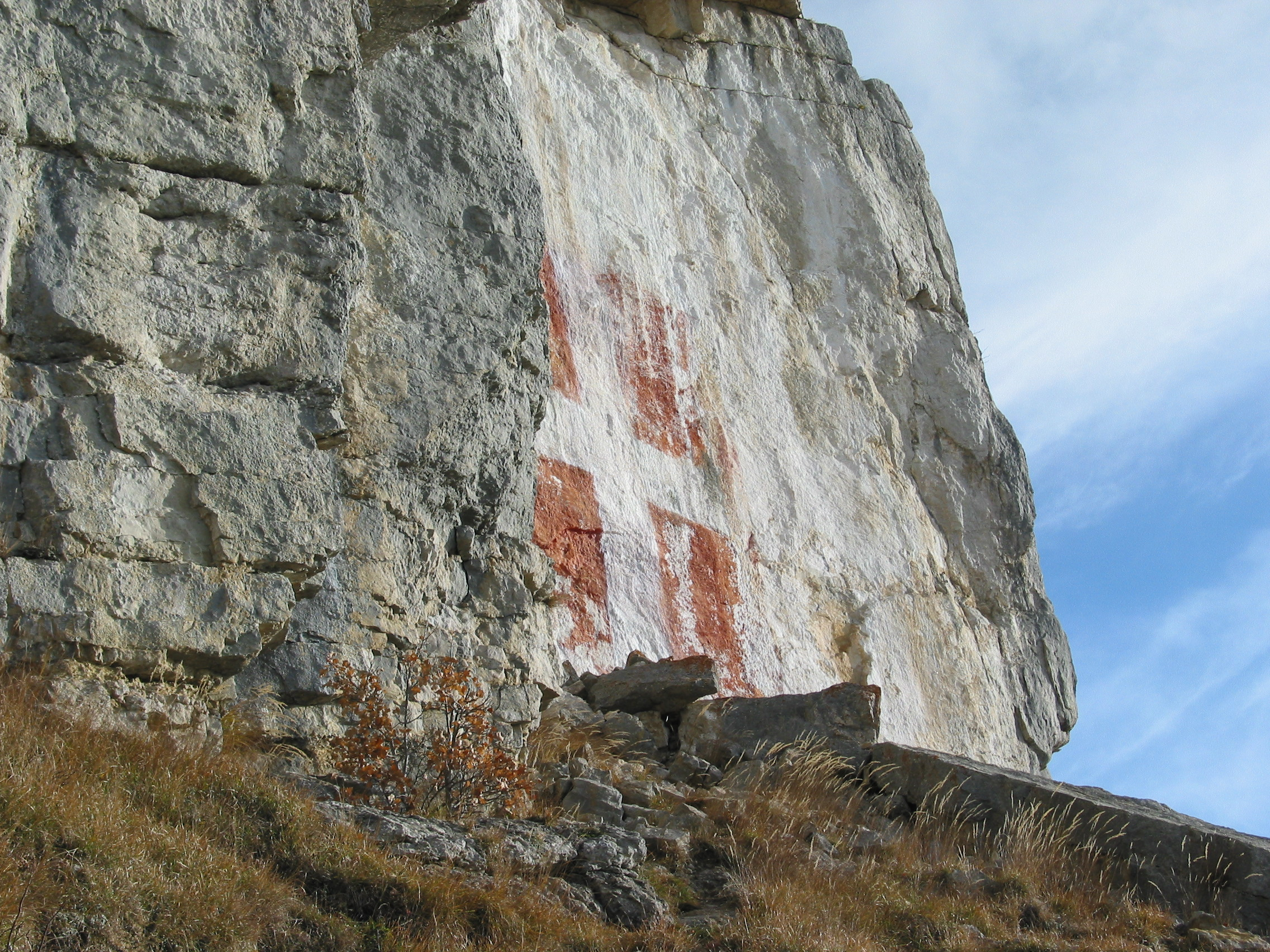
Cross of Savoy at the Salève
