= Monnetier-Mornex =

Monnetier-Mornex Morné (Savoyard)
- Commune
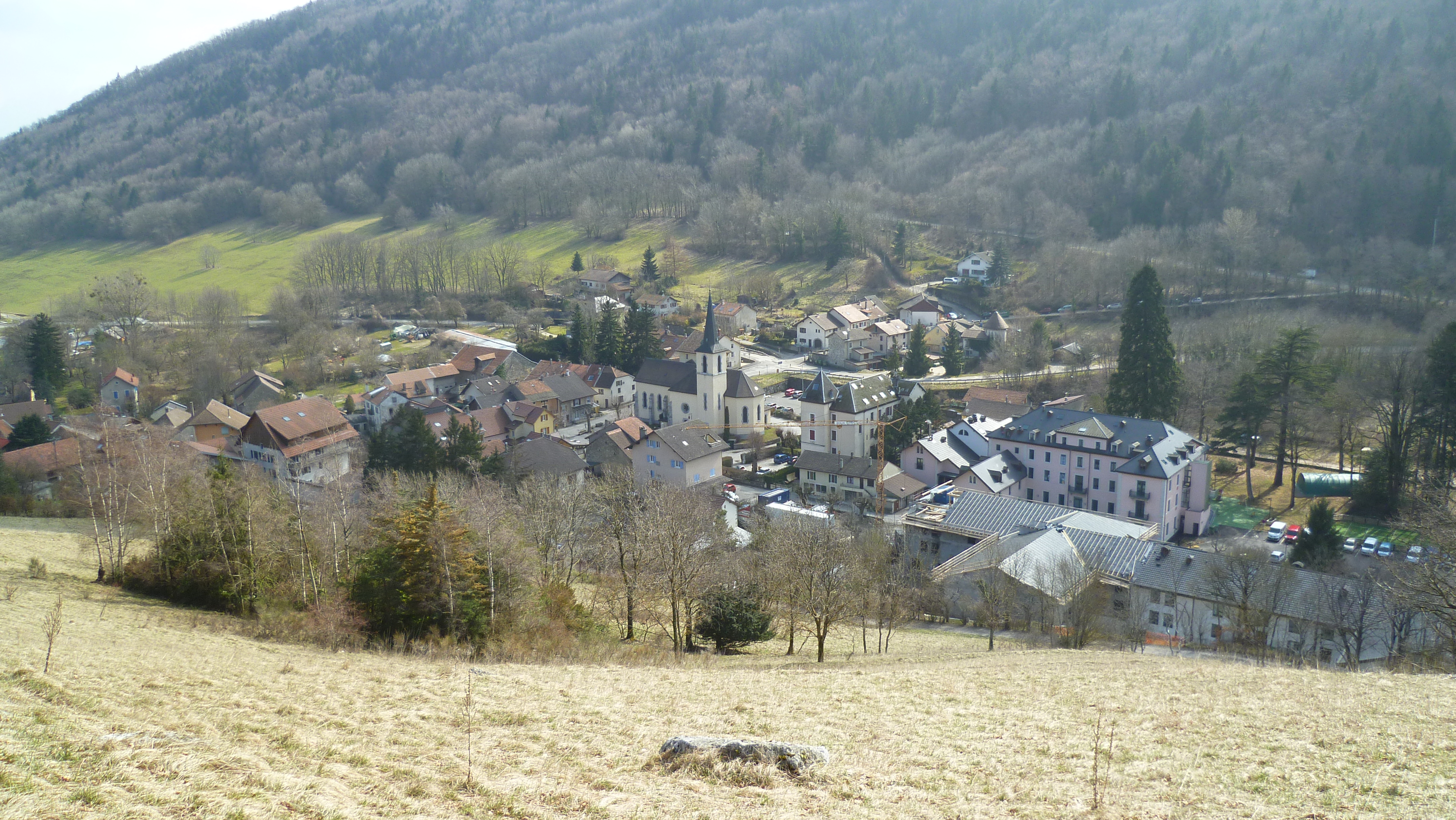
- A general view of Monnetier

- Coat of arms
- Location of Monnetier-Mornex
- Location within France Location within Auvergne-Rhône-Alpes
- Coordinates: 46°09′39″N 6°12′28″E
- Country: France
- Region: Auvergne-Rhône-Alpes
- Department: Haute-Savoie
- Arrondissement: Saint-Julien-en-Genevois
- Canton: La Roche-sur-Foron
- Intercommunality: CC Arve et Salève

Government
  - Mayor (2021–2026): Ludovic Wiszniewski
- Area^{1}: 11.4 km^{2} (4.4 sq mi)
- Highest elevation: 1,268 m (4,160 ft)
- Lowest elevation: 406 m (1,332 ft)
- Population (2023): 2,362
  - Density: 207/km^{2} (537/sq mi)
- Time zone: UTC+01:00 (CET)
  - Summer (DST): UTC+02:00 (CEST)
- INSEE/Postal code: 74185 /74560
- Website: www.monnetier-mornex-esserts.com
- ^{1} French Land Register data, which excludes lakes, ponds, glaciers > 1 km^{2} (0.386 sq mi or 247 acres) and river estuaries.

Monnetier-Mornex (Savoyard: Morné) is a commune in the Haute-Savoie department in the Auvergne-Rhône-Alpes region in south-eastern France. In 1974, it absorbed the former commune Esserts-Salève.

This commune is near Geneva and is made up of three villages, Monnetier (Salève and lesser Salève), the village Esserts-Salève and the village of Mornex. Mornex extends to the bottom of Mont Gosse and is beside the confluence of the river Arve and its tributary the Viaison.

== Population ==
Population data refer to the area corresponding with the commune as of January 2025.

Historical population
| Year | Pop. | ±% p.a. |
|---|---|---|
| 1968 | 969 | — |
| 1975 | 1,429 | +5.71% |
| 1982 | 1,530 | +0.98% |
| 1990 | 1,794 | +2.01% |
| 1999 | 1,792 | −0.01% |
| 2007 | 2,032 | +1.58% |
| 2012 | 2,338 | +2.85% |
| 2017 | 2,295 | −0.37% |
| 2023 | 2,362 | +0.48% |
Source: INSEE

== See also ==
- Communes of the Haute-Savoie department
