= Pas de Chavanette =

Piste on the Swiss-French border

Coordinates: 46°10′32.71″N 6°48′22.58″E

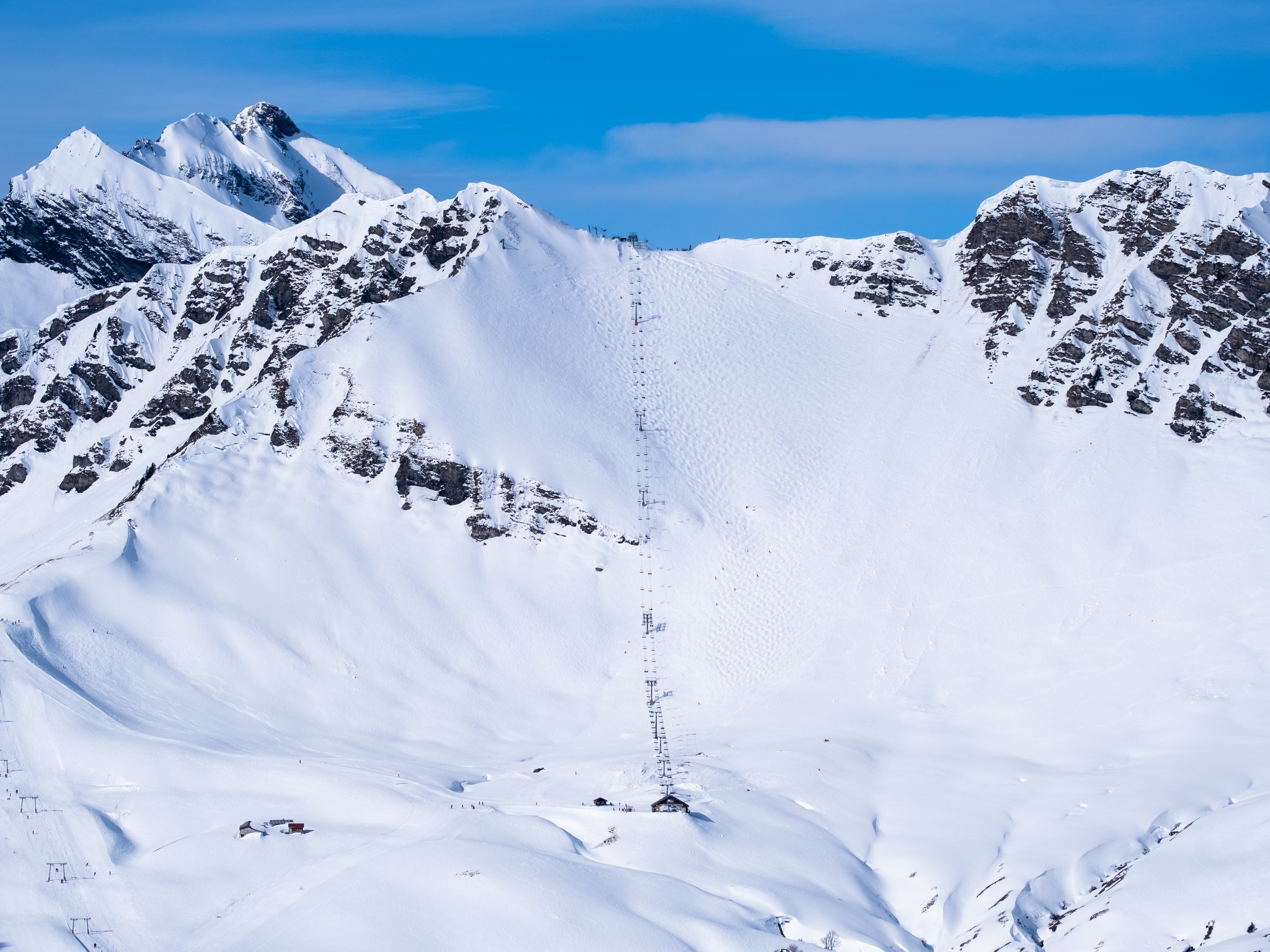
Le Pas de Chavanette

Le Pas de Chavanette, also known as the "Mur Suisse" or "Swiss Wall", is a particularly steep and difficult piste in the Portes du Soleil ski area, on the border between France and Switzerland. It can be reached from the French resort of Avoriaz and from the Swiss towns of Les Crosets and Champéry. Effectively, one starts the run standing on the Swiss-French border, plunging down the Swiss side of the mountain towards Les Crosets.

== Statistics ==
The slope is classified in the Swiss/French difficulty rating as orange, which means that it is rated as too difficult to fit in the standard classification of green, blue, red and black. It has a length of 1 kilometre and a vertical drop of 331 metres, starting at 2,151 metres above sea level.

== Slope layout ==
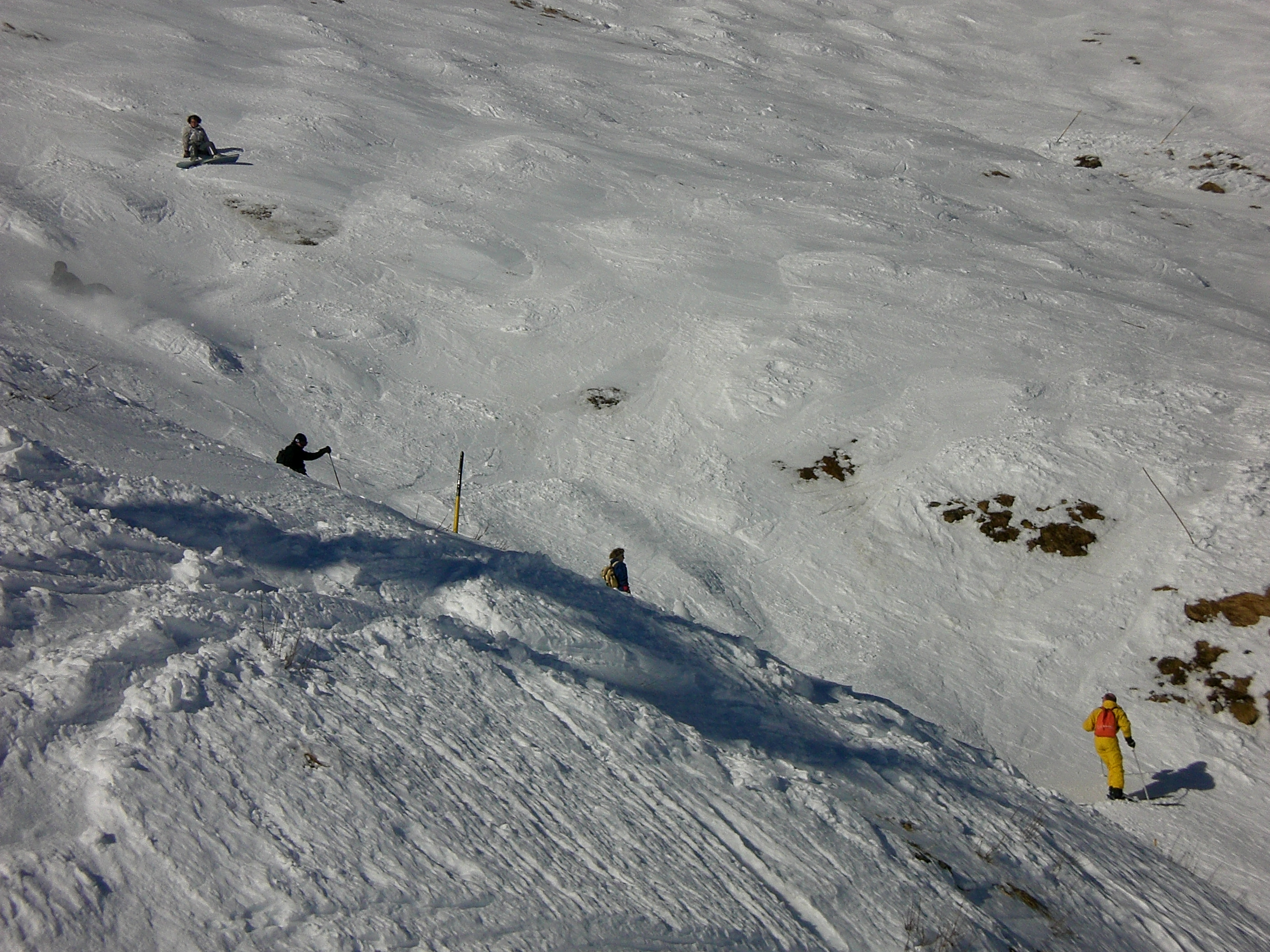
The rocky passage on Le Pas de Chavanette

The slope has moguls throughout. It starts in a narrow pass on the mountain top with an inclication of 40 degrees. In winters with heavy snowfall, the moguls at the top can grow to enormous dimensions — the size of a small car — because of the heavy turns people take to compensate for the inclination and narrow slope.

After the initial 50 metres, the slope widens to the left, allowing skiers and boarders to traverse to a less steep area and make their descent by curving around the more steep and dangerous path directly down the slope.

The direct path goes into a pass between two rocky areas on the right hand side of the slope, about halfway down, which at its narrowest is about ten metres wide. This gives the skier or boarder an impression of being in a very steep half pipe with moguls.

After this passage, the slope eases out with fewer moguls, and narrows as the easier left-hand path merges with the direct path. The last two hundred metres are a flat run directly towards the chair lift back up the mountain, or the easier runs towards Les Crosets and Champéry.
