= Col de Joux Plane =

Mountain pass in France

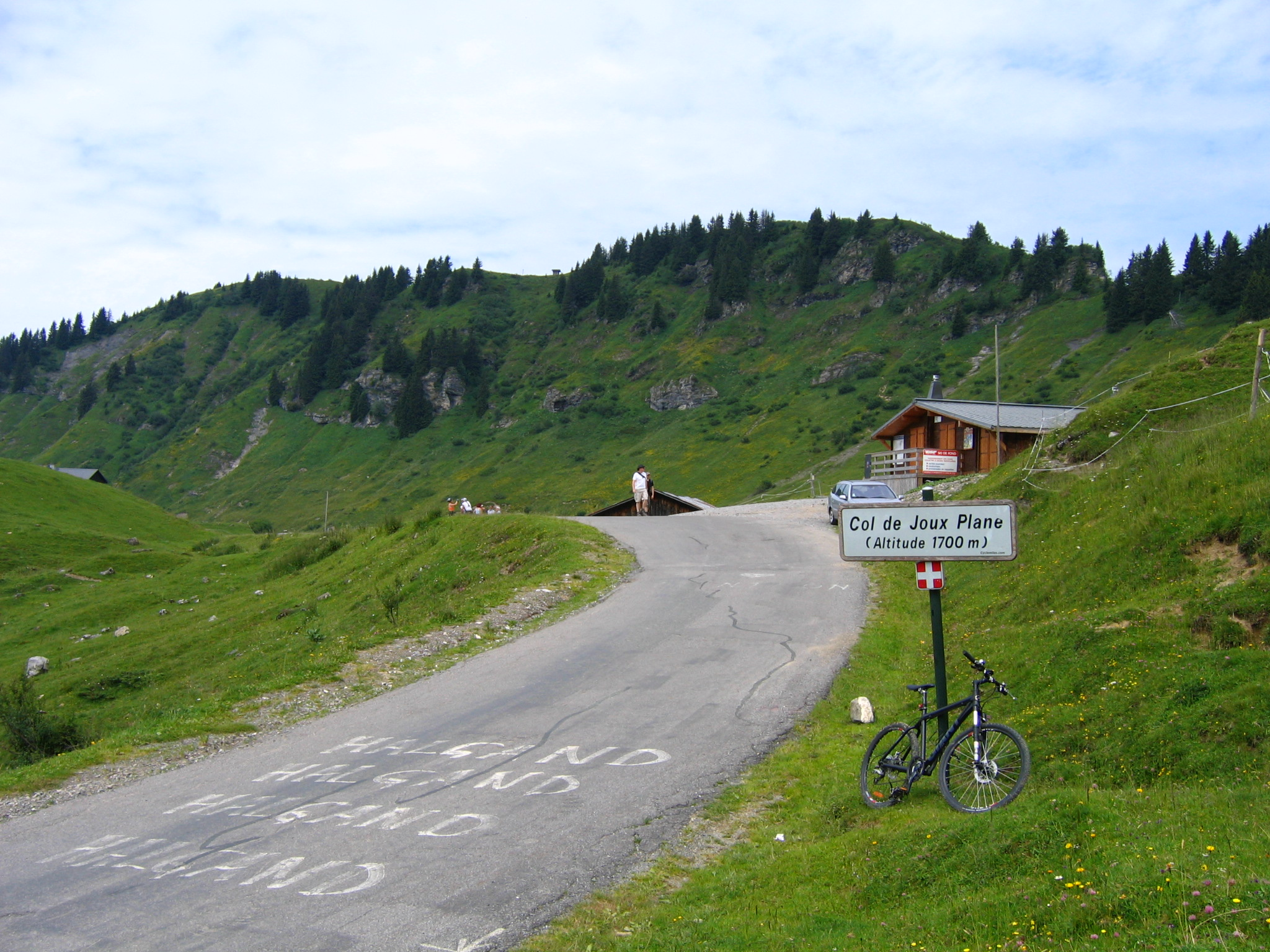
- Col de Joux Plane

- Location within Alps
- Elevation: 1,691 m (5,548 ft)
- Traversed by: D354 road

Third Approach
- Location: Haute-Savoie, France
- Range: Alps
- Coordinates: 46°7′58″N 6°42′41″E

Col de Joux Plane (el. 1691 m.) is a high mountain pass in the Alps in Haute-Savoie, France, linking Morzine with Samoëns. The climb has been featured several times in the Tour de France cycling race.

== Climb details ==
- Starting from Samoëns, the Col de Joux Plane is 11.7 km long with an average gradient of 8.5% and a maximum gradient of 10%.
- Starting from Morzine, the Col de Joux Plane is 10.9 km long with an average gradient of 6.5% and a maximum gradient of 11%.

== Tour de France ==
Col de Joux Plane has been used a total of 13 times by the Tour de France since its debut in 1978.

Year	Stage	Category	Start	Finish	Leader at the summit
1978	17	1	Grenoble	Morzine	Christian Seznec (FRA)
1980	17	1	Serre-Chevalier	Morzine	Mariano Martínez (FRA)
1981	18	HC	Thonon-les-Bains	Morzine	Robert Alban (FRA)
1982	17	1	Bourg-d'Oisans	Morzine	Peter Winnen (NLD)
1983	18	1	L'Alpe d'Huez	Morzine	Jacques Michaud (FRA)
1984	19	1	La Plagne	Morzine	Ángel Arroyo (ESP)
1987	22	HC	La Plagne	Morzine	Eduardo Chozas (ESP)
1991	18	HC	Bourg-d'Oisans	Morzine	Thierry Claveyrolat (FRA)
1997	15	HC	Courchevel	Morzine	Marco Pantani (ITA)
2000	16	HC	Courchevel	Morzine	Richard Virenque (FRA)
2006	17	HC	Saint-Jean-de-Maurienne	Morzine	~~Floyd Landis~~ (USA) (Note: Landis was disqualified from the 2006 Tour de France as a result of a urine sample on stage 17 that was positive for banned synthetic testosterone as well as a ratio of testosterone to epitestosterone nearly three times the limit allowed by World Anti-Doping Agency rules.)
2016	20	HC	Megève	Morzine	Jarlinson Pantano (COL)
2023	14	HC	Annemasse	Morzine	Jonas Vingegaard (DEN)

== Tour de France Femmes ==
The Col de Joux Plane (from Morzine) was featured on Stage 9 of the 2025 Tour de France Femmes

Year	Stage	Category	Start	Finish	Leader at the summit
2025	9	HC	Praz-sur-Arly	Châtel – Les Portes des Soleil	Anna van der Breggen (NED)

== See also ==
- List of highest paved roads in Europe
- List of mountain passes
