= Saint-Jean-d'Aulps =

- Commune
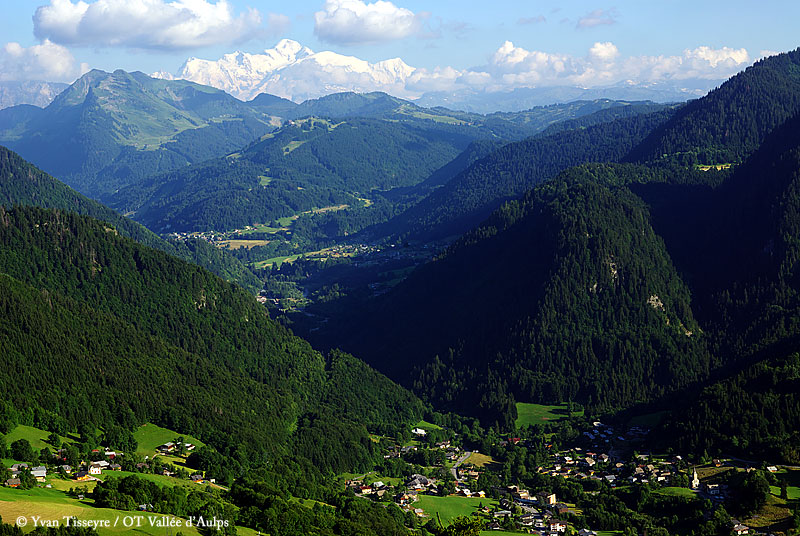
- Saint Jean d'Aulps Village, in the heart of the Vallée d'Aulps

- Coat of arms
- Location of Saint-Jean-d'Aulps
- Location within France Location within Auvergne-Rhône-Alpes
- Coordinates: 46°14′06″N 6°39′23″E
- Country: France
- Region: Auvergne-Rhône-Alpes
- Department: Haute-Savoie
- Arrondissement: Thonon-les-Bains
- Canton: Évian-les-Bains
- Intercommunality: Haut-Chablais

Government
  - Mayor (2020–2026): William Chalençon
- Area^{1}: 40.19 km^{2} (15.52 sq mi)
- Elevation: 801 m (2,628 ft)
- Highest elevation: 2,240 m (7,350 ft)
- Lowest elevation: 734 m (2,408 ft)
- Population (2023): 1,492
  - Density: 37.12/km^{2} (96.15/sq mi)
- Time zone: UTC+01:00 (CET)
  - Summer (DST): UTC+02:00 (CEST)
- INSEE/Postal code: 74238 /74430
- ^{1} French Land Register data, which excludes lakes, ponds, glaciers > 1 km^{2} (0.386 sq mi or 247 acres) and river estuaries.

Saint-Jean-d'Aulps (French pronunciation: [sɛ̃ ʒɑ̃ do]; Arpitan: San Zhan) is a commune in the Haute-Savoie department in the Auvergne-Rhône-Alpes region in south-eastern France. Situated in the heart of the Vallée d'Aulps, as well as being the home to an active farming community, it is popular with holiday-makers in the Summer, for walking, and in the Winter for skiing as it is a part of the massive Portes du Soleil ski area.

The inhabitants are called (in French) the "Jovanétiens". The commune is spread over 40.2 km^{2} (15.5 sq mi) and has 1,558 inhabitants (2019), 6,900 beds for tourists, 464 main residences, and 1,358 secondary residences. The population density is 39 inhabitants/km^{2} (2019). Saint-Jean-d'Aulps is surrounded by the communes of Seytroux, Le Biot, Abondance, Essert Romand and Bellevaux. The closest town is Thonon les Bains 25 km (16 mi) away. The river "la Dranse de Morzine" is the main water course through the village. In the commune, at an altitude of 805 m (2,641 ft), is the ski-area "l'Espace Roc d'Enfer". One can ski between 900 and 1,800 m (3,000 and 5,900 ft) above sea level and offers, amongst wild, unspoilt, and preserved terrain, 20 pistes (ski-runs) givings a total of 40 km (25 mi) of tracks. A large portion of these tracks are covered by artificial snow-making machines to make the skiing more snow-sure in lighter Winters. Saint-Jean-d'Aulps also offers many summer-time activities, namely: rock climbing, via ferrata, walking and hiking, mountain-biking routes, fishing, and para-gliding.

== History ==
The village grew up around Aulps Abbey, a Cistercian monastery founded at the very end of the 11th century and suppressed in 1793 during the French Revolution. The buildings were reduced to ruins in 1823 when they were quarried for stone to rebuild the village's parish church.

== Culture ==
Being a Winter skiing resort town and Summer holiday destination activity in the town tends to be seasonal with an influx of tourists twice a year. As for the permanent residents, there is a higher-than-normal percentage of non-French residents (mostly British). These residents are typically involved in the skiing and tourism industry in the Portes du Soleil serving clients in their local language. In addition to this type of work there is an active sheep, cattle, and dairy farming community.

== Ski ==
The skiing area in Saint-Jean-d'Aulps is situated above the town and is called Espace Roc d'Enfer, or La Grande Terche. The skiing area covered by the larger Portes du Soleil lift pass which includes 14 resorts in France and Switzerland. The ski area does not link directly to the other Porte du Soleil stations however. There is a shuttle bus from the tourist office in Saint-Jean-d'Aulps to Morzine, Les Gets and Avoriaz in the winter season.

The local ski area, La Grande Terche, is around 8 minutes from the town centre by car. A free shuttle bus also brings people from the village to the skiing area. Although the area is limited in terms of lifts and marked pistes, the pistes offer a good variety of varied skiing and in particular a large amount of off-piste terrain. This tends to remain unskiied days after the larger resorts are tracked out. At the base of the gondola lift there are a couple of restaurants and bars and a ski hire shop.

Le Roc d'Enfer is home to the Circuit Roc d'Enfer, a marked, posted set of red ski runs which is broken into two 5 km (3.1 mi) sections of uninterrupted Alpine skiing set in a calm valley. The two 5 km (3.1 mi) sections are linked by a chair- and then drag-lift at the village of La Chevrerie in the Vallée Verte.

== Twin towns ==
Saint-Jean-d'Aulps is twinned with Santec, Finistère, France.

== See also ==
- Communes of the Haute-Savoie department
