= Jorquera (disambiguation) =

Jorquera is a municipality in the province of Albacete, Castile-La Mancha, Spain.

Jorquera may also refer to:

- Jorquera River, Chile
- Jorquera (caldera), Atacama Region, Chile
- Navas de Jorquera, a municipality in Albacete, Castile-La Mancha, Spain

== People ==
- Albert Jorquera (b. 1979), Spanish footballer
- Andrés Jorquera Tapia (b. 1976), Chilean ski mountaineer and high mountain guide
- Cristóbal Jorquera (b. 1988), Chilean footballer
- Francisco Jorquera (b. 1961), Spanish politician
