= Les Crosets =

Village and ski resort in the Canton of Valais, Switzerland

Coordinates: 46°11′02.36″N 6°50′05.53″E

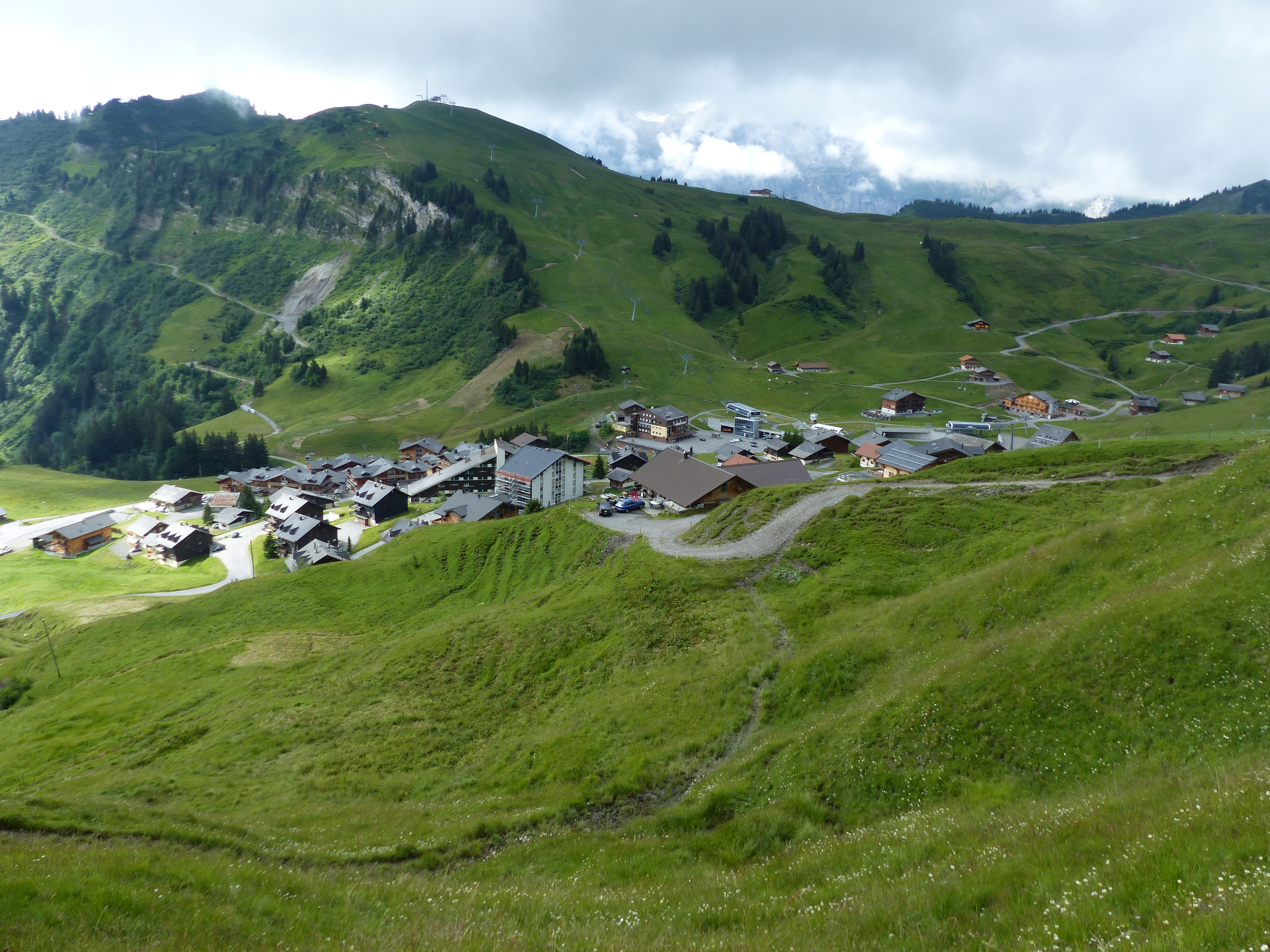
Les Crosets

Les Crosets is a village and ski resort in the Canton of Valais, Switzerland. It is part of the Val-d'Illiez municipality, and Portes du Soleil ski area.

== Location and access ==
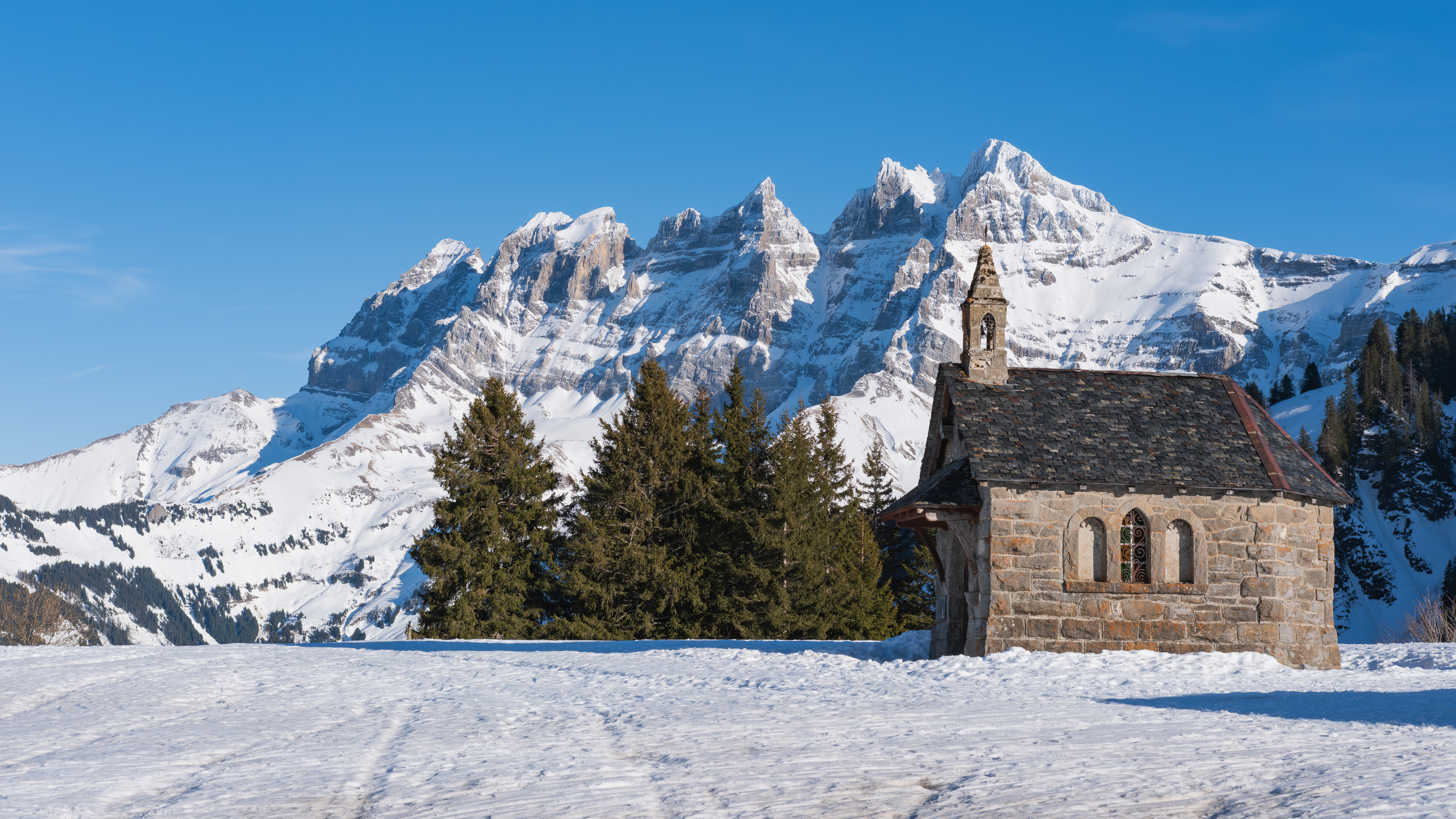
Chapel in Les Crosets with the Dents du Midi in the background

At 1,670 metres (5,480 ft), Les Crosets is the highest altitude of any resort of the Swiss side of the Portes du Soleil. It is, however, one of the smallest as well. It is easily reached by skis from Champery, Châtel and Avoriaz. It has a sunny, snowy microclimate and allows splendid views of the Dents Du Midi.

Les Crosets is approximately two hours by car from Geneva airport. The final approach to the village is a winding, unmarked road, which is open year-round. There is no public transport within the village, however, a Post Bus connects to the cogwheel train in Val-d'Illiez.

== Population ==
Around 60 people live in Les Crosets year-round. This number swells significantly during the winter ski season, as the village hosts as many as 650 visitors. There are a number of hotels in the village, and some private apartments are available on AirBnB.

The full-time population largely work in the tourism industry, supporting the hotels, restaurants and ski infrastructure.

== Tourism and sports ==
=== Winter sports ===
Les Crosets is famous for its winter sports. As the highest resort in the Swiss side of Portes du Soleil, it receives a great deal of snow, often early in the season. Les Crosets has an average snowfall of 48 cm.

Les Crosets offers alpine skiing, snowboarding, sledding and snowshoeing. The village is located in the center of the Portes du Soleil ski resort, which contains 650 km of piste. From Les Crosets, a good skier can reach the French Avoriz resort in 20 minutes. Les Crosets encompasses the famous Swiss Wall - a mogul run which is considered one of the ten hardest ski runs in the world. A snowpark offers jumps and freestyle skiing and snowboarding, and chairlifts transport as many as 4,000 people per hour.

While nightlife in the traditional sense (clubs and bars) is notably absent, Les Crosets offers night skiing regularly.

Two ski stores offer rental equipment, and a number of ski schools operate in the area.

=== Summer sports ===
Mountain biking, ebiking and hiking are popular summer sports in Les Crosets. Fishing in Lac Vert is also possible.

== Notable inhabitants ==
Swiss ski racer Corinne Rey-Bellet, was born, raised and violently killed in Les Crosets.
