= Pointe des Mossettes =

Mountain in Switzerland

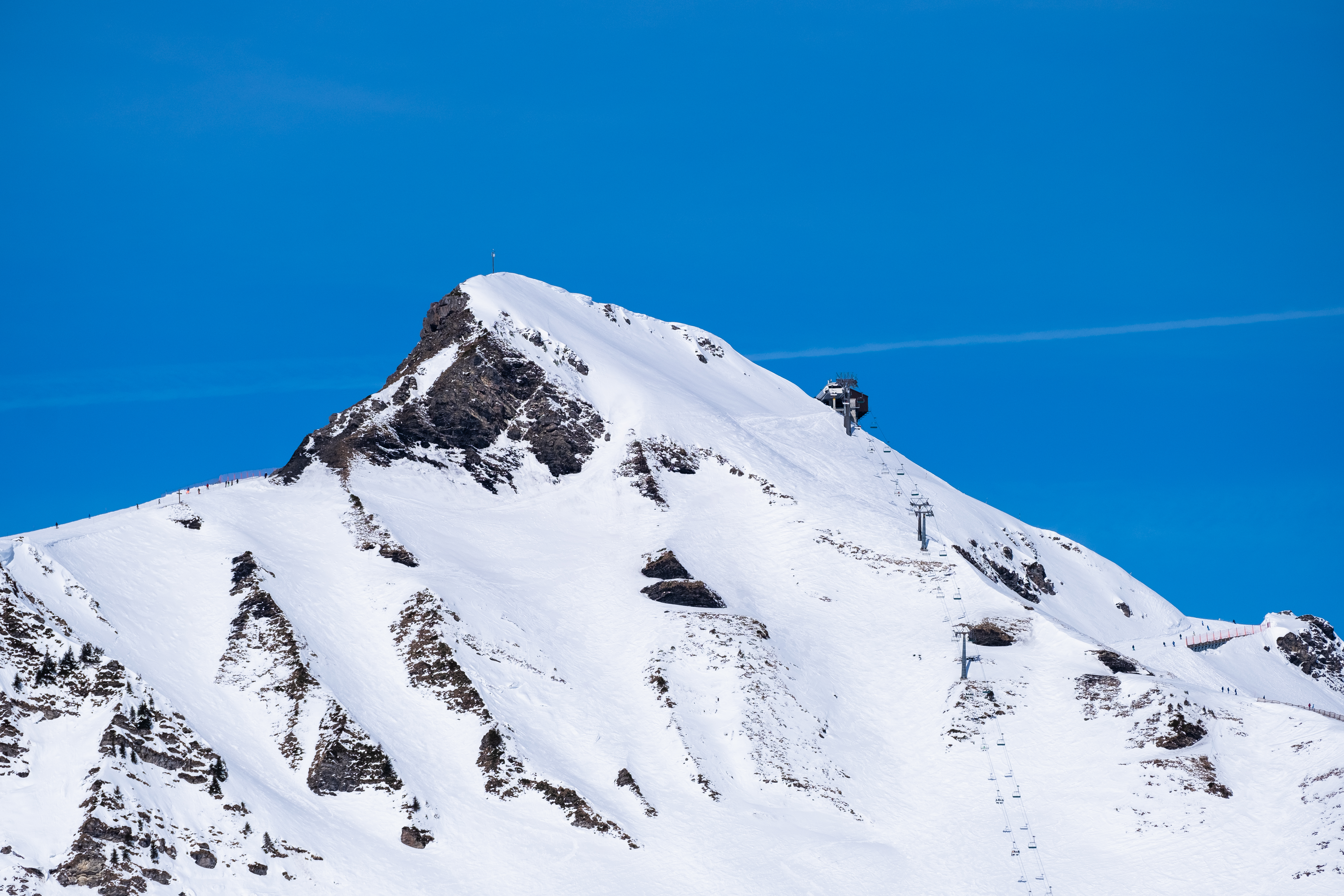
- South-east side

Highest point
- Elevation: 2,277 m (7,470 ft)
- Prominence: 193 m (633 ft)
- Parent peak: Hauts-Forts
- Coordinates: 46°11′26.5″N 6°48′58″E

Geography
- Location within Switzerland
- Location: Valais, Switzerland
- Parent range: Chablais Alps

The Pointe des Mossettes (2,277 m) is a mountain of the Chablais Alps, overlooking Les Crosets in the Swiss canton of Valais. The French border runs west of the summit on a straight line, although the mountain lies on the main watershed between the Dranse river basin and the Val d'Illiez.

The mountain is part of the international ski area Portes du Soleil and its summit can be reached by cable car from Les Crosets or Avoriaz (France).

== See also ==
- List of mountains of Switzerland accessible by public transport
