= Lac d'Avoriaz =

- Location within France
- Location: Avoriaz, Haute-Savoie
- Coordinates: 46°11′8″N 6°46′58″E
- Primary outflows: Dranse de Morzine
- Basin countries: France
- Surface area: 6.4 ha (16 acres)
- Max. depth: 10 m (33 ft)
- Surface elevation: 1,778 m (5,833 ft)

Lac d'Avoriaz is a lake in Haute-Savoie, France.
