= International Ski Mountaineering Federation =

Governing body of ski mountaineering competitions

- Sport: Ski mountaineering
- Jurisdiction: International
- Membership: 55 National Federations
- Founded: 27 February 2008; 18 years ago
- Headquarters: Lausanne, Switzerland
- President: Regula Meier (SUI)
- Secretary: Jordi Canals Fontan (ESP)

Official website
- www.ismf-ski.org

The International Ski Mountaineering Federation (ISMF) is the international governing body responsible for ski mountaineering competitions. Its main aims are promotion, regulation, and development of ski mountaineering worldwide. In 2026 the sport will be part of the programme of the Olympic Winter Games Milano Cortina 2026.

== History ==
The "International Council for Ski Mountaineering Competitions" (ISMC) was founded in 1999 as an internal body of the "Union Internationale des Associations d'Alpinisme" (UIAA). The ISMC was created to govern and administer the sport of ski mountaineering, replacing the "Comité International pour le Ski Alpinisme de Compétition" (CISAC), which was founded in 1988 in Barcelona. On 6 October 2007, the General Assembly of the UIAA approved the new statutes, where the position of "unit member" was created. As a consequence of this change, it was deemed necessary to constitute an independent "international competition federation with its own juridical personality", named the "International Ski Mountaineering Federation" (ISMF). The Constitutional Assembly of the ISMF members held on 27 February 2008 in Champéry, Portes du Soleil (Switzerland), decided to continue to administer ski mountaineering competitions as an International Federation with its own legal entity.

Today the ISMF is a non-profit association with the legal headquarters in Lausanne and the administrative office in Mondovì (Italy).

== Organisational structure ==
The organisational structure of the ISMF has been significantly implemented since 2018. Today it can count on various internal commissions that determine and regulate its functioning according to the sector of reference: anti-doping, sustainability, medical, disciplinary, sport development, regulations. The organisational structure of the International Ski Mountaineering Federation consists of a Bureau, which includes the President, the Secretary General and three representatives of the main macro areas (Sport, Marketing and Communication, Finance), one of whom also covers the role of Vice-President. In turn, the Bureau is part of the Council, which, in addition to the aforementioned people, presents four representatives from member association, a representative of male athletes and a representative of female athletes and a representative for each continental council.

== Disciplines ==
- Team race: The most traditional form of ski mountaineering competition, since only team events were once present. The teams comprise two or three athletes of the same sex and belonging to the same category to be valid for the purpose of the ISMF rankings. This type of race has to include at least three ascents and as many descents, even if in long distance races there are generally more. The competitions frequently transit on the crests of mountains, while the descents are off-piste. A standard team race lasts a maximum of three hours and covers a total altitude difference of about 2,000 metres.
- Individual race: Similar to the team competition, but based on a single athlete. The race consists of at least three ascents and as many descents, but also a part on foot with skis carried in the backpack. Although ISMF events no longer use cables and harnesses, crampons may still be required for steeper, icier ascents. The races normally last from one and a half to two hours and can cover a total height difference of 1,900 metres. The race start is always a mass start of all athletes together.
- Sprint race: This is a mini Individual race, combining the essential characteristics and techniques of ski mountaineering between an ascent (including a part on foot with skis in the backpack) and a single descent from the top. As the name suggests, it is a very fast race that is based on completing the total track in about three minutes for the fastest athletes. The first round is an individual qualification with the athletes starting in succession every 20 seconds, after which groups of six people start. Although the ascent is usually on flat snow, the descent can be off-piste, with gates and small jumps.
- Vertical race: This event involves a single long ascent. It usually takes place on flat snow and entirely with skins under skis. It has not to exceed an altitude difference of 700 metres.
- Relay race: This type of race takes place in teams of three or four athletes, who take on the "circuit" one after the other, competing one team at a time. It is a rather fast event, lasting about 15 minutes per circuit, which includes two ascents and as many descents, as well as a short section with skis in the backpack. The total height difference is about of 150–180 metres.

== ISMF competitions ==
- World Cups of Ski Mountaineering
- World Championship of Ski Mountaineering
- European Championship of Ski Mountaineering
- Asian Championship of Ski Mountaineering
- South American Ski Mountaineering Championship
- North American Ski Mountaineering Championship
- Series

Categories:

- U18 = 17/18 years (Cadets)
- U20 = 19/20 years (Juniors)
- U23 = 21/22/23 years (Espoirs)
- O21 = > 21 years (Seniors)

== Organisations to which the ISMF belongs ==
- Global Association of International Sports Federations (GAISF) since 2010
- ARISF since 2014
- Provisional recognition as an Olympic Federation since 2014
- Olympic Federation since 2016

== National Federations members ==
Country	National union
Andorra	Federació Andorrana de Muntanyisme (FAM)
Argentina	Federación Argentina de Ski y Andinismo (FASA)
Armenia	Armenian Ski Mountaineers Association (ARMSKI)
Austria	Österreichischer Skiverband (ÖSV)
Azerbaijan	Azerbaijan Winter Sports Federation (AWSF)
Belgium	Climbing & Mountaineering Belgium (CMBel)
Brazil	Confederacao Brasileira De Desportos Na Neve (CBDN)
Bulgaria	Bulgarian Climbing and Mountaineering Federation (BCMF)
Canada	The Alpine Club of Canada (ACC)
Chile	Federación de Andinismo de Chile (FEACH)
China	Chinese Mountaineering Association (CMA)
Czech Republic	Czech Mountaineering Association (CMF)
Denmark	Skiforbund Ski Federation Denmark (SSFD)
Finland	Finnish Climbing Association (SKIL)
France	Fédération française de la montagne et de l’escalade (FFME)
Germany	Deutscher Alpenverein (DAV)
Greece	Hellenic Federation of Mountaineering and Climbing (EOOA)
India	Ski Mountaineering Association (India) (SMAI)
Iran	I.R.Iran Mountaineering&Sport Climbing Federation (IRIMSCF)
Italy	Federazione Italiana Sport Invernali (FISI)
Japan	Japan Mountaineering & Sport Climbing Association (JMSCA)
Nepal (Provisional Member)	Ski and Snowboard Foundation Nepal (SSFN)
Netherlands	Nederlandse Klim-en Bergsportvereniging (NKBV)
Norway	The Norwegian Ski Federation (NSF)
Poland	Polish Mountaineering Association (PZA)
Portugal	Federação de Campismo e Montanhismo de Portugal (FCMP)
Romania	Romanian Federation of Mountaineering and Climbing (RFMC)
Russia	Russian Mountaineering Federation (RMF)
Slovakia	Slovak Skimountaineering Association (SSA)
Slovenia	Alpine Association of Slovenia (PZS)
South Korea	Korean Alpine Federation (KAF)
Spain	Federación Española de Deportes de Montaña y Escalada (FEDME)
Spain	Federació d Entitats Excursionistes de Catalunya (FEEC) (Associated Member)
Sweden	The Swedish Climbing Federation (SKF)
Switzerland	Swiss Alpine Club (SAC-CAS)
Thailand	Ski and Snowboard Association of Thailand (SSAT)
Turkey	Turkish Mountaineering Federation (TDF)
United Kingdom	British Mountaineering Council (BMC)
United States	United States Ski Mountaineering Association (USSMA)

In March 2022, due to the 2022 Russian invasion of Ukraine, the ISMF banned the participation of Russian and Belarusian athletes and officials in international competitions; it also canceled all events planned to take place in Russia.

== See also ==
- Ski orienteering
