= CISAC =

CISAC may refer to:

== Places ==
- Canberra International Sports & Aquatic Centre, a sport centre located in Canberra, Australia
- Center for International Security and Cooperation, a Stanford University research center devoted to international security issues and influencing policymaking.

== Organisations ==
- Comité International du Ski-Alpinisme de Compétition, former international committee of competition ski mountaineering
- Committee on International Security and Arms Control, a standing committee of the United States National Academy of Sciences
- Confédération Internationale des Sociétés d'Auteurs et Compositeurs, the International Confederation of Societies of Authors and Composers
