= 2005 South American Ski Mountaineering Championship =

The 2005 South American Ski Mountaineering Championship (Spanish: Campeonato Sudamericano de Esquí de Montaña) was the first edition of a South American continental championship of competition ski mountaineering.

== Event ==
The event, which was carried out in combination with the last race of the South American Ski Mountaineering Cup race and the "2nd International Open" event at San Carlos de Bariloche from 26 to 27 August 2009, was organized by the Federación Argentina de Ski y Andinismo (FASA) and the Club Andino Bariloche (CAB). It was officially sanctioned by the International Council for Ski Mountaineering Competitions (ISMC), by the Unión Panamericana de Montaña y Escalada (UPAME), by the Federación Española de Deportes de Montaña y Escalada (FEDME) and by the Escuela Militar de Montaña, the mountain warfare school of the Argentine Army.

The competitors came from Argentina and Chile, and also two male racers from Spain, one from Italy and one from Switzerland in the framework of the "International Open of Ski Mountaineering".

== Results ==
Event was held on the Cerro Catedral on 27 August 2005. The European participants (italic in the men's ranking list below) did not count in the continental championship ranking, but appeared in the "International Open" ranking.

List of the best 10 participants by gender:

=== Women ===
ranking	participant	total time
	(Argentina) Mercedes Sahores	01h 20' 58"
	(Argentina) Macarena Arrieta	01h 36' 49"
	(Chile) Viviana Callahan	01h 43' 13"
4	(Argentina) Ailin Maria Reising	01h 48' 46"
5	(Argentina) Carolina Barbagallo	02h 18' 42"

=== Men ===
ranking	participant	total time	Intern. Open ranking
	(Argentina) Leonardo Proverbio	01h 33' 33"	
	(Argentina) Carlos Galosi	01h 34' 53"	
––––	(Spain) Carlos Del Prado	01h 46' 34"	
	(Chile) Andrés Jorquera Tapia	01h 47' 40"	4
4	(Argentina) Carlos Cabezas	01h 50' 14"	5
––––	(Spain) Sergio Camacho	01h 52' 08"	6
5	(Chile) Cristian Kantór	02h 00' 24"	7
––––	(Italy) Alejandro Masperi	02h 00' 35"	8
6	(Argentina) Gabriel Goin	02h 22' 19"	9
––––	(Switzerland) Nicolás de la Cruz	02h 29' 07"	10
7	(Argentina) Ivan Bocanacalza	02h 29' 45"	11
8	(Argentina) Víctor Krajcirik	02h 37' 33"	12
9	(Argentina) Marcelo Hostar	02h 44' 03"	13
10	(Argentina) Diego Novoa	02h 44' 07"	14
