= 2009 South American Ski Mountaineering Championship =

The 2009 South American Ski Mountaineering Championship (Spanish: Campeonato Sudamericano de Esquí de Montaña) was the third edition of a South American continental championship of competition ski mountaineering, and the first that was sanctioned by the International Ski Mountaineering Federation (ISMF), which emerged from the International Council for Ski Mountaineering Competitions (ISMC) in 2008. Furthermore, the competition was sanctioned by the Unión Panamericana de Montaña y Escalada (UPAME).

The event, carried out at Villa La Angostura from 22 to 23 August 2009, was organized by the Federación Argentina de Ski y Andinismo (FASA), the Club Andino Bariloche (CAB) and the local Club Andino Villa La Angostura (CAVLA). Participating were racers from Argentina and Chile as well as two French competitors, that did not appear in the continental ranking.

== Results ==
Event was held on the Cerro Bayo on August 23, 2009.

List of the best 10 participants by gender:

=== Women ===
ranking	participant	total time
	(Argentina) Mercedes Sahores	01h 30' 57"
	(Argentina) Carolina Barbagallo	01h 46' 38"

=== Men ===
ranking^{*)}	participant	total time
	(Argentina) Leonardo Proverbio	01h 04' 45"
	(Argentina) Carlos Galosi	01h 12' 40"
	(Argentina) Julián Casanova	01h 17' 21"
4	(Argentina) Luis José Quiroga	01h 18' 01"
5	(Chile) Oscar Commentz	01h 19' 11"
6	(Argentina) Carlos Cabezas	01h 21' 42"
7	(Chile) Federico Scheuch	01h 22' 05"
8	(Argentina) Martin Nicolas Bavdaz	01h 22' 19"
9	(Argentina) Alessandro Masperi	01h 22' 33"
10	(Argentina) Ezio Mucelli	01h 24' 08"

^{*)} The French racers Jérôme Pezet (01h 03' 44") and Olivier Levasseur (01h 03' 45") finished first and second, but were no South American nationals.
