= Carlos Galosi =

Argentine ski mountaineer and mountain climber

Personal information
- Full name: Carlos Javier Galosi
- Born: June 1, 1975 (age 51) San Carlos de Bariloche, Argentina

Sport
- Sport: Skiing
Medal record
Men's ski mountaineering
Representing Argentina
South American Championship
Silver medal – second place	2005 San Carlos de Bariloche	Individual
Silver medal – second place	2009 Villa La Angostura	Individual

Carlos "Charly" Javier Galosi (born June 1, 1975) is an Argentine ski mountaineer and mountain climber

Galosi was born and lives in San Carlos de Bariloche. He studied at National University of Comahue.

== Selected results ==
- 2005: 2nd, South American Championship, individual
- 2009: 2nd, South American Championship, individual
