= Guarinus of Sitten =

French Roman Catholic saint

Saint Guarinus of Sitten
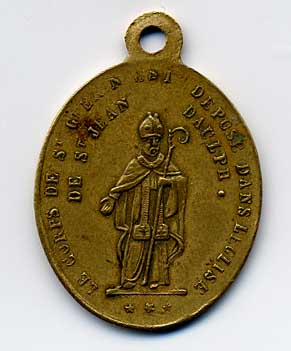
- Medallion of St. Guarinus, given to pilgrims

Bishop of Sion
- Born: 1065; Pont-à-Mousson, France
- Died: 27 August 1150; Aulps, France
- Venerated in: Roman Catholic Church
- Feast: 27 August
- Patronage: Animals, protection from animal diseases

Guarinus of Sitten (German: Warin, French: Guérin) was Bishop of Sion.

Guarinus was born in Pont-à-Mousson, Lotharingia, around 1065, into a noble family. About 1085 he became a monk at the Benedictine monastery of Molesme Abbey. In 1094, together with a group of brothers, he founded a daughter house of Molesme, Aulps Abbey in Savoy. Guarinus became the second abbot. The abbey's name is derived from the Latin word alpibus, meaning "mountain pastures". Guarinus is a patron saint of cattle.

In 1138, Guarinus was appointed bishop of Sion and later became revered as a saint. He died at Aulps Abbey in 1150.
