= Mercedes Sahores =

Argentine ski mountaineer and mountain climber

Personal information
- Full name: Mercedes Noel Sahores Rosauer
- Born: September 24, 1974 (age 51) Neuquén Province, Argentina

Sport
- Sport: Skiing
Medal record
Women's ski mountaineering
Representing Argentina
South American Championship
Gold medal – first place	2005 San Carlos de Bariloche	Individual
Gold medal – first place	2009 Villa La Angostura	Individual

Mercedes Noel "Tety" Sahores Rosauer (born September 24, 1974) is an Argentine ski mountaineer and mountain climber. She became the first Argentine woman to reach the summit of Mount Everest on May 19, 2009.

== Biography ==
Sahores, daughter of Luis María Sahores Gattari and his wife Marta Irene Rosauer, was born in the Neuquén Province as the youngest of four children. Her oldest brother Luis María ("Minino") died from Leukemia at the age of 20 years.

Sahores attended the Colegio San Martín and afterwards the Instituto María Auxiliadora in San Pedro Sula, Honduras, until 1993. Afterwards she studied biology at CAECE University in Buenos Aires until 2000. She is member of the National Agricultural Technology Institute (INTA), lives in San Carlos de Bariloche.

== Selected results ==
- 2005: 1st, South American Championship, individual
- 2009: 1st, South American Championship, individual
