= Lac de Vonnes =

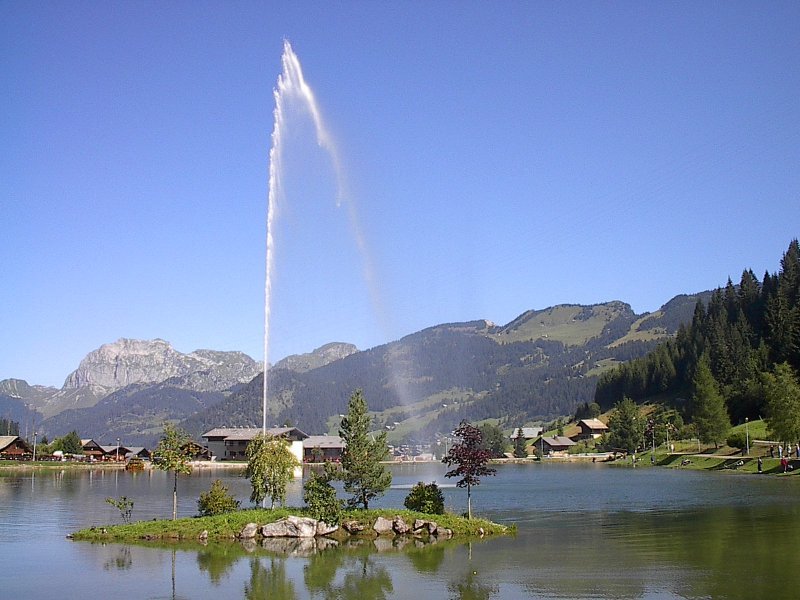

- Location within France
- Location: Châtel, Haute-Savoie
- Coordinates: 46.2571°N 6.8413°E
- Type: reservoir
- Basin countries: France
- Surface area: 25 ha (62 acres)
- Max. depth: 10 m (33 ft)
- Surface elevation: 1,242 m (4,075 ft)

Lac de Vonnes is an artificial lake at Châtel in Haute-Savoie, France.
