= Jorquera (caldera) =

Caldera in Chile

Jorquera is a caldera in Chile, 70 kilometres (43 mi) southeast of Copiapo.

This caldera has a diameter of 9 kilometres (5.6 mi) and is located between the Pauma-Estancilla fault in the west and the Iglesia Colorada fault in the east. The caldera is filled with breccia and several ignimbrite and lava layers, up to several 100 metres (330 ft) of thickness. These ignimbrites radiating away from the centre of the caldera are formed from welded lithic-rich dacite. After the formation of the caldera trachyandesitic lava flows rich in biotite and pyroxene were erupted, forming layers with thicknesses of 20–50 metres (66–164 ft).

At the northeastern margin of the caldera a dacitic lava dome with a surface area of 2 square kilometres (0.77 sq mi). On the western margin the formation of a granodiorite intrusion body with a surface area of 2.5 square kilometres (0.97 sq mi) was accompanied by hydrothermal alteration. 7 kilometres (4.3 mi) northeast of the caldera lies the dacitic Sierra Los Chilenos structure. The later lava domes are of trachydacitic-rhyolitic composition. Southeast of Jorquera lies the Carrizalillo caldera.

The formation of the caldera is linked to the geological history of the Copiapo ranges. After Cretaceous-Paleogene episodes of rifting during the Paleocene-Eocene caldera and stratovolcano occurred. The caldera itself is constructed on top of various sedimentary and volcanic formations dating back to the Jurassic but also including late Mesozoic and Tertiary rocks.
