= Portes du Soleil =

Skisports destination in the Alps

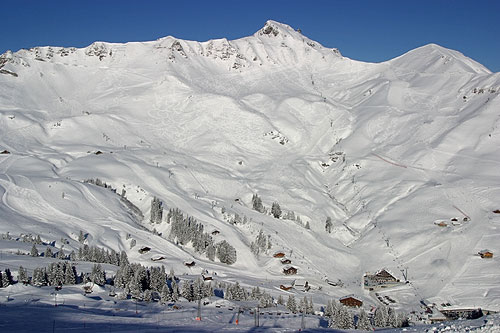
- Les Crosets

- Location within Alps
- Location: France and Switzerland
- Nearest city: Monthey and Aigle
- Coordinates: 46°11′37″N 6°46′24″E
- Top elevation: 2,466 m (8,091 ft)
- Base elevation: 930 m (3,050 ft)
- Skiable area: 1,036 km^{2} (400 sq mi)
- Trails: 300 total; - 37 (12%) beginner; - 123 (41%) easy; - 110 (37%) intermediate; - 30 (10%) difficult
- Longest run: Rapaille - Grand Paradis (7.5km)
- Total length: 650 km (400 mi)
- Lift system: 214 total; 3 cable cars; 10 gondolas; 76 chair lifts; 125 surface lifts
- Terrain parks: 10
- Snowfall: 8.7 m (29 ft) (average 1998–2008)
- Snowmaking: 694 cannons
- Website: www.portesdusoleil.com

Les Portes du Soleil (French pronunciation: [le pɔʁt dy sɔlɛj], literally "The Doors of the Sun") is a major skisports destination in the Alps, encompassing twelve resorts between Mont Blanc in France and Lake Geneva in Switzerland. With more than 650 km of marked pistes (claimed by the lift companies; an independent expert measured about 426 km) and about 200 lifts in total, spread over 14 valleys and about 1,036 square kilometres (400 sq mi), Portes du Soleil ranks among the two largest ski areas in the world (the other being Les Trois Vallées). Almost all of the pistes are connected by lifts – a few marginal towns can be reached only by the free bus services in the area. The highest elevation accessible on skis is 2260 m (Pointe de Mossettes) and the lowest is 930 m (Abondance Village). As with many other Alpine ski resorts, the lower slopes of the Portes du Soleil have snow-making facilities to extend the ski season by keeping the lower slopes open during the warmer months.

The name Portes du Soleil originates from the 1,950-meter-high pass of the same name, connecting Morgins to Les Crosets.

== History ==
1934 – During the summer of 1934, the first lift in the Portes du Soleil (The name 'Portes du Soleil' didn't exist then) was constructed. It was the 25-seater Pleney cable car in Morzine. The lift officially opened to the public on December 15, 1934. At the time, Pleney was spelt 'Plenay' making the official name 'Telepherique du Plenay'.

1937 – Construction of the 'Boule de Gomme' draglift in Les Gets. This lift is still operated today making it the oldest current lift in the Portes du Soleil.

1939 – In Champery, the 18-seater Champery - Planchaux cable car was constructed. This was the first cable car in French-speaking Switzerland and only the third of its kind in the entirety of Switzerland.

1947 – The first new development after WWII was the draglift 'Vonnes' in Chatel.

1950 – A new ski lift in Morgins called 'Morgins - Les Tetes' is built.

1952 – A gondola is built in the summer of 1952 on Super Morzine with 94, 2-seater open-air cabins. The lift opened in 1953 was only operated until a fire in 1964.

1953 – A chairlift in Chatel is built which goes by the name of 'Chatel - Conche'. The lift opens up a new area for skiing in Chatel.

1958 – This year saw the construction of the 1-seater chairlift 'Follieuse' in Morgins which offered skiing on the Savolaire plateau which allowed skiers to enjoy the view of the Dents du Midi.

1960 – Construction of the 35-seater cable car in Morzine, which gave access to the Nyon Plateau.

1963 – On March 17, The Prodains cable car officially entered into service. Each cabin could hold 80 people.

1965 – The name 'Portes du Soleil' is officially given the ski area. The name comes from the mountain pass above the resort of Les Crosets.

1967 – The new Avoriaz ski resort was inaugurated on January 8. A month later, on February 4, the 'Chalet-Neuf' draglift was inaugurated which allowed the connection between Chatel and Morgins. On December 24, the 'La Linga' Gondola opened which allowed for skiing on the north facing slopes of Chatel.

1969 – The inauguration of two ski lifts between Champery and Avoriaz. These two lifts met at the 'Pas de Chavanette' which allowed for skiing between the two resorts. The world's first international lift pass was used after the opening of this link (Access for Avoriaz - Les Crosets - Champery).

1973 – Construction of a two-seater chairlift with bubbles in St Jean d'Aulps which allowed for skiing to start on the Grande Terche area.

1975 – Construction of the chairlift 'Plan de Croix - Le Trochey' which allows access to the Abondance Valley from Torgon.

1976 – The first Portes du Soleil lift pass was used. The resort of Champoussin was also founded.

1977 – Two lifts up to Pointe de L'Au were constructed allowing for the connection between Les Crosets and Champoussin.

1981 – Construction of the 'Chaux Fleurie' and 'Rochassons' chairlifts which made the connection between Avoriaz and Chatel.

1986 – The Chavanette chairlift was destroyed by an avalanche and wouldn't open for the rest of the winter. The famous 'Swiss Wall' run which was serviced by the chairlift was still open however.

1987 – Morzine and Avoriaz were linked by the connection of a gondola, two chairlifts and two ski lifts. A new lift in Torgon allowed the connection between 'Torgon' and 'Chapelle d'Abondance'.

1993 – Europe's first detachable 6-seater chairlift 'Tour' was built in Avoriaz. Also in Avoriaz, the Mossettes chairlift is built allowing the return to the Swiss side of the Portes du Soleil from Lindarets with having to go via 'The Swiss Wall'.

1999 – The Portes du Soleil is one of the first ski areas in the world to use hands-free lift pass recognition turnstiles.

2008 – On December 6, the first eight-seater chairlift in French-speaking Switzerland entered service. To this day, it is the most efficient ski lift in the Portes du Soleil with a capacity of 4,000 people per hour.

2013 – In April 2013, the new 3S Prodains cable-car is opened 50 years after the original Prodains cable-car.

2015 - On January 17, the Portes du Soleil celebrated its 50th anniversary. The connection between the 'Linga' and 'Super Chatel' areas can now be made on skis with the construction of two new lifts that were inaugurated on January 31, 2015.

2017 - The six-seater 'Ranfoilly' chairlift in Les Gets, which is the fastest chairlift in the Portes du Soleil with an operating speed of 6 m/s, was put into service.

== Resorts ==
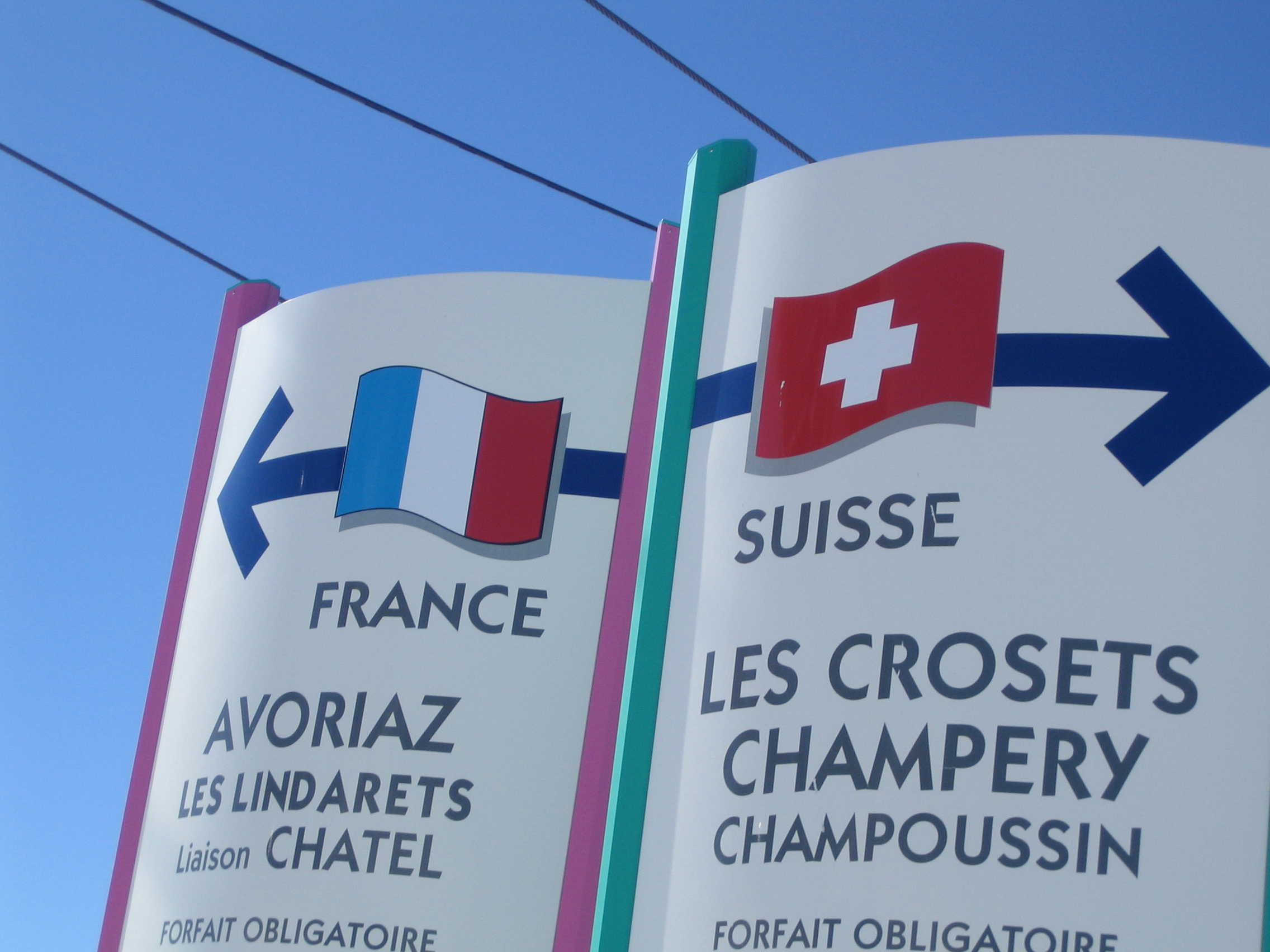
The border between France and Switzerland on the slopes.

There are thirteen resorts in the Portes du Soleil area, of which seven are French and five are Swiss. Most of the resorts have grown around traditional valley villages - only Avoriaz and the very small Les Crosets and Torgon were purposely built during the mid-sixties. Morzine and Chatel are the largest of the traditional towns in the area. As a whole the skiing is relatively low in altitude compared to most French destinations. The highest skiing is just below 2,300 m (7,500 ft) and the lowest is approximately 900 m (3,000 ft). However, the area is heavily influenced by the microclimate between Lake Geneva and Mont Blanc, which generates very substantial snowfall between November and April making it possible to keep the area open to skiing typically from early December until mid to late April. Some of the lower stations close around April 1 or earlier depending on snow conditions though.

=== Avoriaz ===
The most modern skiing and accommodation of the Portes du Soleil is the resort of Avoriaz with more than 18.000 beds in 2017. Avoriaz is among the largest purpose-built ski destinations in the world. Avoriaz features purpose-built wood-clad buildings reaching 15 stories and a car-free policy. Avoriaz has extensive offerings for snowboarders and freestyle skiers – 3 major snow parks, border cross, snow cross zones and more. Avoriaz is a hub for a number of summer-activities as well: mountain biking, golf, paragliding, climbing and hiking. There are many restaurants and bars around the area, some also open during the summer.

=== Morzine ===
Morzine is the largest town in the Portes du Soleil area. It is a traditional market town and the town from which the idea of a large connected ski area stems. Morzine has been one of the leading ski destinations in Europe for 80 years, with a large choice of hotels and apartments in Morzine and on the surrounding mountainsides. There are bus services for the Prodains gondola, the Ardent gondola and the Nyon cablecar, while cablecars to Supermorzine (Avoriaz) and to Pleney can be walked to from the town centre. At an altitude of just 950 meters, Morzine offers predominantly easy to medium skiing. Morzine is the most northern of the French Alpine resorts and benefits from the regional microclimate between Mont Blanc and Lake Geneva.

=== Chatel ===
Châtel is a village on the border with Switzerland. The village stretches from Lac de Vonnes (near the border) down to centre. There are 2 main ski areas in the village, Super Châtel is reached by cabincar or chairlift from the centre of town and from here links by lift are made to the Swiss towns of Torgon and Morgins. During the 2014–2015 season new lifts were opened linking Super Chatel with the Linga / Pré La Joux area. This area forms the link between Chatel and Avoriaz and while it is dominated by intermediate and difficult slopes, it is possible to ski all the way to Avoriaz on beginner slopes. Above Pré la Joux lies the small mountain village of Plaine Dranse in which almost all the houses are turned into restaurants. There is also a small church built into the rock. The resort of Chatel lies at 1200 m and the highest point of skiing is about 2200 m.

=== Les Gets ===
Les Gets is an alpine village situated on the Col des Gets between Morzine and Taninges at an altitude of 1172m with a year-round population of around 1,300 people. The resort is popular among families with many gentle runs at the top of the Chavannes gondola. The ski area in Les Gets ranges from an altitude of 950m to 2000m and is serviced by many modern lifts.

=== Morgins ===
Morgins forms part of the Swiss section of Portes du Soleil and is not as crowded as the larger resorts in France. The skiing is linked to Chatel on one side of the village and to Champoussin to the other side. As one of the lower resorts with shallow runs, Morgins is among the first to close connections to other areas when the snow melts in spring. The skiing in Morgins is comparatively easy, many of the lifts are draglifts.

=== Les Crosets ===
Les Crosets is a very small resort in the Portes Du Soleil located in Switzerland. It can be reached by ski from Morgins and Avoriaz. It allows views of the Dents Du Midi and has a large funpark. A famous steep black itinerary piste nicknamed The Swiss Wall (a steep mogul run) can be reached from Les Crosets. There are three top stations connecting to Avoriaz – Pointe de Mossette, Grand-Conche, and Chavanette. Les Crosets is built above the village of Champery. The two stations are connected by the Champéry-Plancachaux cable car. There are no pistes connecting Les Crosets to Champery. Skiers have to either go down by cablecar or ski down to Grand Paradis and continue by car or shuttle bus.

=== Champery ===
Champery is a Swiss village situated at an altitude of approximately 1050 meters, nestled at the base of the Dents du Midi and the Dents Blanches, at the end of the Vallée d’Illiez. It is a 150 years old village which was among the initiating towns when the Portes du Soleil ski area was established in the late Sixties. There are no pistes leading all the way down to Champery village, due in part to the fact that the mountainside above the town is heavily exposed to snow. The Champéry – Planachaux cable-car (125 passengers) and the 6-seater chairlift in Grand-Paradis are fast connections into the Portes du Soleil system. There is one ski run, Ripaille, which runs to the Grand-Paradis chairlift and car park just a kilometre outside Champery village when conditions are favourable

=== Torgon ===
Torgon is a purpose-built ski resort and is known by locals as the "Balcon du Chablais". The resort is situated at an altitude of 1085m. Skiing can be done here as low as 1150m altitude with the Fingards drag lift. Torgon is small resort which serves as the link between the two French resorts of Châtel and La Chapelle dʼAbondance and therefore plays a role within the Portes du Soleil of linking these two resorts. Torgon also has views of Lake Geneva and the Dents du Midi.

=== La Chapelle d'Abondance ===
La Chapelle d'Abondance is a savoyard village which is located 1000m above sea level in the Abondance valley, between other local tourist destinations, such as Châtel and Abondance. The village has two ski areas: Crêt Béni and Braitaz.

Skiing in La Chapelle d'Abondance is done on both sides of the valley. The historic side is that of Crêt-Béni, which is north-facing and dominated by the Mount Grange at an altitude of 2432m above sea level. The first ski lift was built there in the 1970s. The ski area on this side of the valley can be accessed directly from the village center. On the other side of the valley is Braitaz ski area, built in 1987. It provides the connection on skis from La Chapelle d'Abondance to most other Portes du Soleil resorts.

=== Champoussin ===
Located in the 'Val d'Illiez', in the Valais canton of Switzerland is the ski resort of Champoussin. Situated at an altitude of 1600m, the village and resort of Champoussin is on a plateau facing the Dents du Midi. Champoussin is located between the Swiss ski resorts of Les Crosets and Morgins which are also in the Portes du Soleil.

=== Saint Jean d'Aulps ===
Saint-Jean-dʼAulps is a small town located at around 800m altitude in the Vallée d'Aulps. The ski area of the town is named 'l’Espace Roc d'Enfer', after the nearby mountain that dominates the landscape, and is linked with the neighbouring resort of La Chèvrerie (Bellevaux). Although not connected by skis, the Roc dʼEnfer area is commercially attached to the Portes du Soleil area and there are shuttle buses to access Morzine, Les Gets and Avoriaz in winter. The skiing here is between 900m and 1800m. There are also plans to link up the ski area here with the nearby town of Les Gets.

=== Other resorts ===

- Montriond (France)
- Abondance (France)
- Val d'Illiez (Switzerland)
