= Aulps Abbey =

Abbey in Haute-Savoie, France

Coordinates: 46°14′29″N 6°38′59″E

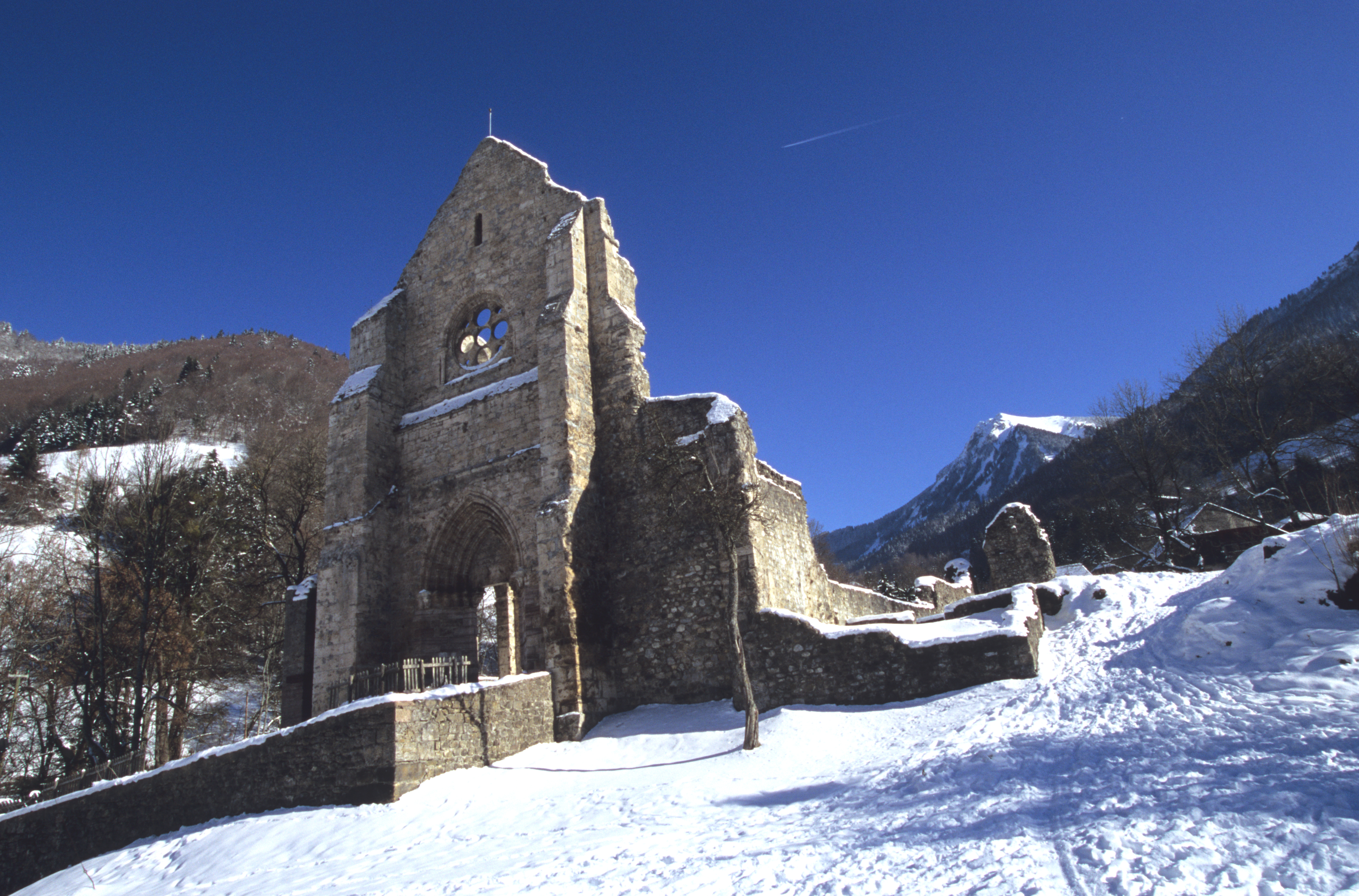
Aulps Abbey under the snow, winter 2008

Aulps Abbey is a former Cistercian monastery located at an altitude of 810 metres in the village of Saint-Jean-d'Aulps in the Aulps Valley, Haute-Savoie, French Alps. It is 7 km from Morzine, 25 km from Thonon and 60 km from Geneva.

Aulps Abbey was a major Cistercian site in the Haute Savoie region for almost seven hundred years, from its foundation in the 1090s to its suppression in 1793. The church was partially destroyed in 1823, for its stones, but the superb 13th century façade remains standing. In addition to the majestic ruins of the abbey, classified as a monument historique in 1902, the three-hectare estate includes agricultural buildings, cellars, a gatehouse and a medicinal garden.

== History ==
Aulph Abbey was founded at the very end of the 11th century by monks from Molesme Abbey in Burgundy, including the eventual second abbot of Aulph Guarinus of Sitten, later Saint Guarinus. Its name derives from the Latin word alpibus which means "mountain pastures". Aulph was affiliated to the Cistercian Order in 1136. After the death of Guarinus the abbey became a place of pilgrimage on account of his relics, which were held here. (In 1961, the name was changed from St Jean d'Aulph to St Jean d'Aulps, France.)

The abbey's influence quickly spread throughout the Chablais, Faucigny and Jura regions. The abbots became the right-hand men of the Counts of Savoy and lords of Faucigny. Some of them later became bishops.

In 1792, the French invaded the Savoy and drove out the last monks. The abbey was formally suppressed in the following year. The last buildings remained intact through this time and it was not until 1823 that the inhabitants of Saint-Jean-d'Aulph decided to reconstruct the burned-out parish church nearby and to use the abandoned monastery as a quarry for the stone.

The owner of the abbey farm, Ernest Tavernier, saved the last remains by having the site listed as a "monument historique" in 1902. Between 1930 and 1940, the massive work of clearance was begun by the priest of Saint-Jean-d'Aulph, Father Alexis Coutin, who restored the grandeur of the abbey church.

== Architecture ==
=== The church ===
The construction of the abbey started around 1150. The work lasted about sixty years and was effectively finished when the church building was consecrated on 26 May 1212 by the Bishop of Geneva. The builders used local materials – tuff (a light-weight chalk-based rock), red limestone and river stones – and followed the restrained Cistercian floor-plan prescribed by Saint Bernard.

The façade is particularly streamlined, creating a monumental effect. The first level is taken up by the entrance. Splayed in shape, it is protected by an archivolt within five pointed arches increasing in size. Above the door, the second level corresponds with the interior gallery of the church. The third level is entirely occupied by a rose window centred under a vast load-bearing arch, supported by corniced columns.

Inside, the nave and the side aisles were roofed with ribbed vaults, as at other Cistercian churches, such as those of the abbeys of Hauterive, Acey, Noirlac and Casamari.

There is a little restrained plant-form sculpture in the interior, predominantly the waterleaf. The false triforia built into the thickness of the internal walls are especially noteworthy: the successive niches create an architectural illusion of non-existent circulation corridors above, which reinforces the grandeur of the building.

Another feature of the site, the tomb of Saint Guarinus, second abbot of Aulps, was located in the nave. His relics were the object of popular pilgrimage.

In spite of its partial destruction in 1823, the church of Aulps Abbey is regarded as one of the jewels of Cistercian architecture.

=== Gatehouse ===
The gatehouse is the historical entrance of Aulps Abbey. Today it shelters an architectural model. It dates from the late 15th or early 16th century and has two large doors and a third for pedestrians. It was not only a passageway but also sheltered the abbot's court and various activities relating to alms and administration.

=== Abbey farm ===
The old abbey farm (now containing both permanent and temporary exhibitions of the Domaine de Découverte) was the heart of the abbey's past economy. The farm consisted of a barn/cowshed joined to the gateway building and a farmhouse, containing vaulted rooms. It dates from the end of the 17th century and was certainly used in the manufacturing of cheese.

=== Cellars ===
The abbey's wine was stored in three vaulted south-facing cellars. Levels of consumption were high but the wine had a low alcohol content and only a short shelf-life. It came from the abbey's properties situated near Cluses, Thonon, Geneva and the more remote Salins. The cellars also had an elaborate drainage and cleaning system.

=== Garden ===
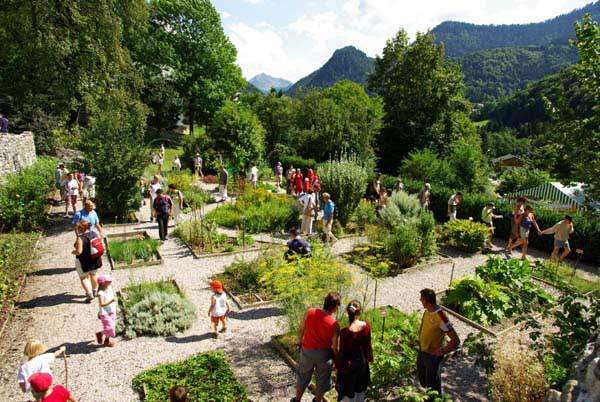
The abbey's medicinal garden

The present garden, created in the former monks' garden, consists of two terraced levels. The upper one grows the medicinal herbs and plants, while the lower one contains the kitchen garden growing old varieties of vegetables. The medicinal plants are laid out in beds according to their use in traditional medicine.

=== Mill ===
The Rule of St. Benedict insisted that mills should be installed on monastery estates. The mill of Aulps was used until 1694, when it was moved to the abbey's hamlet. It was a wheat mill coupled with a hemp beater. Water was taken several hundred metres upstream, above the estate, and was channelled through a partly visible underground masonry aqueduct in masonry, then into a wooden gully before finally falling on the wheel.

=== Cloister ===
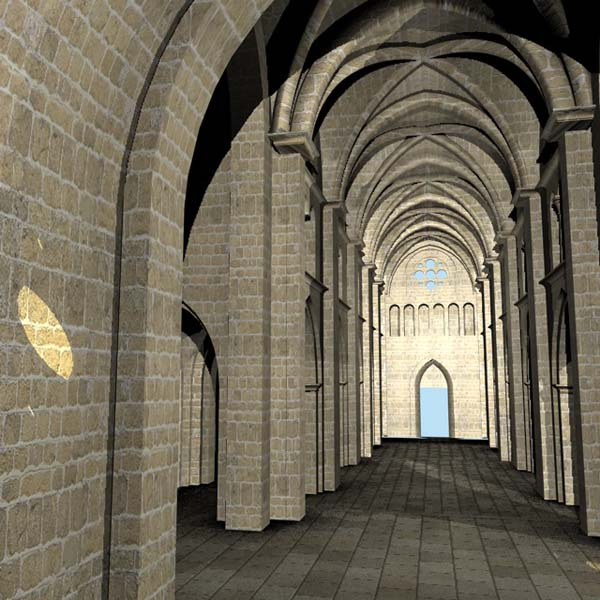
3D reconstruction of the church

The cloister was located, according to monastic tradition, south of the church. It was partly destroyed at the beginning of the 19th century, but archaeological excavations have revealed details of its layout. As elsewhere, this building consisted of a square courtyard surrounded by four covered galleries, off which opened the various usual rooms: chapter house, refectory, lavatorium and so on.

== Present day ==
The old monastic farm, now restored and transformed, houses the museum of the "Domaine de Découverte de la Vallée d'Aulps". The exhibition areas, 650 m^{2}, explain the daily lives of the monks and their role in the community, the relations between the Aulps Abbey and the Savoy region, the story of the destruction of the abbey and the secrets of medicinal plants.

== See also ==
- List of Cistercian monasteries in France
