= Morzine =

Morzine Morzena (Arpitan)
- Commune
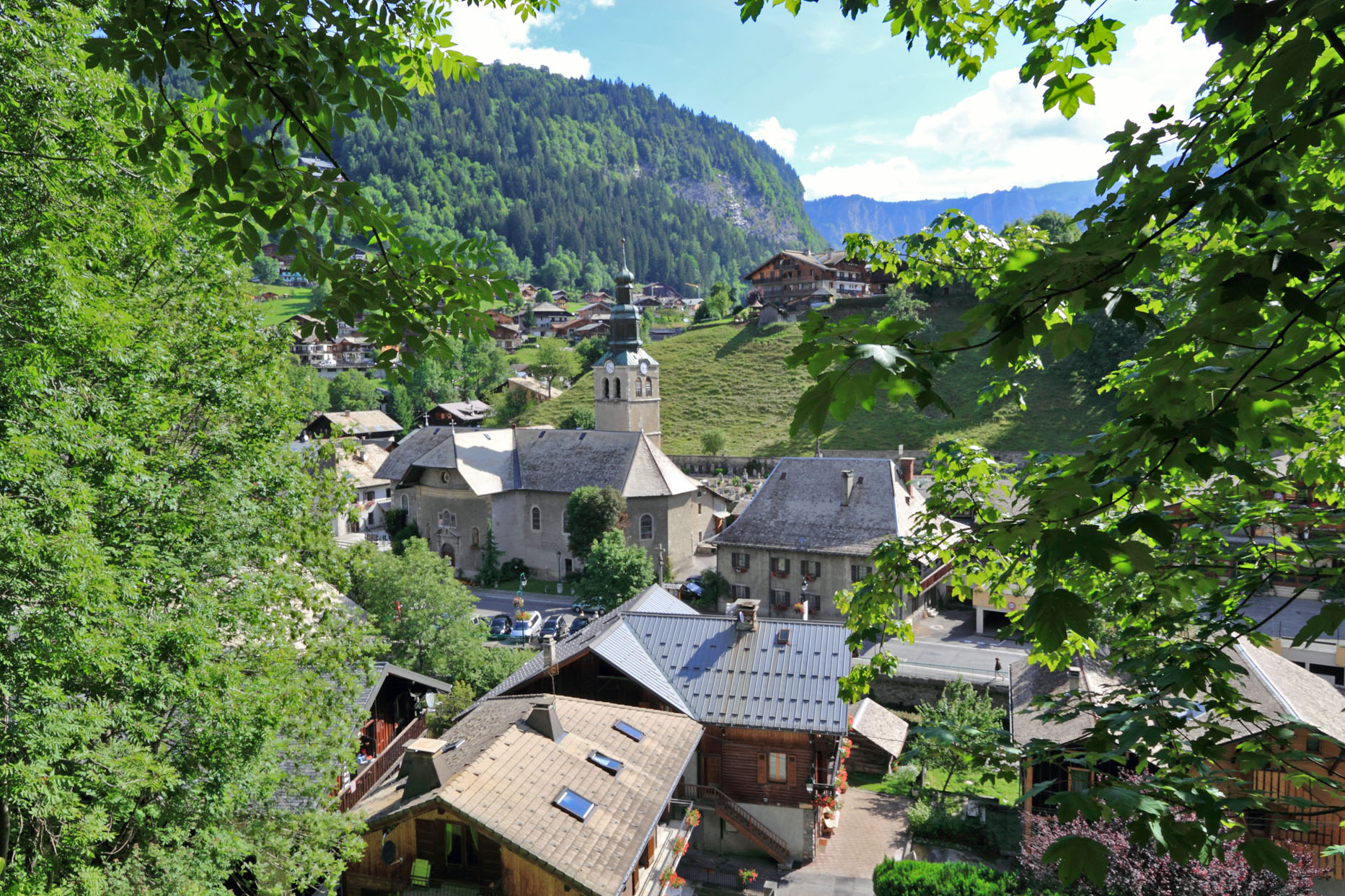
- August 2010 view of Morzine

- Flag Coat of arms
- Location of Morzine
- Location within France Location within Auvergne-Rhône-Alpes
- Coordinates: 46°10′44″N 6°42′32″E
- Country: France
- Region: Auvergne-Rhône-Alpes
- Department: Haute-Savoie
- Arrondissement: Thonon-les-Bains
- Canton: Évian-les-Bains
- Intercommunality: Haut-Chablais

Government
  - Mayor (2024–2026): Jean-François Berger
- Area^{1}: 44.1 km^{2} (17.0 sq mi)
- Highest elevation: 2,002 m (6,568 ft)
- Population (2023): 2,658
  - Density: 60.3/km^{2} (156/sq mi)
- Demonym: Morzinois
- Time zone: UTC+01:00 (CET)
  - Summer (DST): UTC+02:00 (CEST)
- INSEE/Postal code: 74191 /74110
- Website: www.mairie-morzine-avoriaz.com
- ^{1} French Land Register data, which excludes lakes, ponds, glaciers > 1 km^{2} (0.386 sq mi or 247 acres) and river estuaries.

Morzine (French pronunciation: [mɔʁzin]; Arpitan: Morzena), alternatively known as Morzine-Avoriaz (pronounced [mɔʁzin avɔʁja]), is an alpine commune on the Swiss border in the Haute-Savoie department in the Auvergne-Rhône-Alpes region in Southeastern France.

It is located in the French-Swiss Chablais historical area, south-southeast of Évian-les-Bains and just west of Champéry in Valais. The town of Morzine is situated in the French Alps' Vallée d'Aulps (Aulps Valley), which stretches from Morzine to La Vernaz in the northwest.

A traditional market town in the heart of the Portes du Soleil, Morzine is dominated by chalets spread across a river gorge, bordered by partially wooded slopes which provide skiing even in poor weather conditions. Situated at an altitude of about 1,000 m, it is one of the most northerly of the French Alpine resorts, weatherwise benefiting from the Mont Blanc microclimate. The locality enjoys panoramic mountain views and modern ski facilities, as well as hotels and restaurants in the town itself. The ski resort of Avoriaz is located on the territory of the commune.

== History ==
In 1181, Morzine (Latin: Morgenes, or "border area") was a grange of Aulps Abbey, a Cistercian monastery 7 km away. In the Middle Ages, granges were agricultural centres from which the monks exploited their landscape and co-ordinated farming and industrial work. The grange was fundamental to the Cistercians' successful expansion and management of their mountain land. The granges supplied the monastery's food, clothing, utensils and building materials. The granges were manned by lay-brothers, who cultivated the lands and reared livestock.

From the 18th to the early 20th century, the exploitation of slate quarries was an important economic activity of Morzine, before winter tourism took over around in 1930. Between 1857 and 1870, the commune received national attention for an unusually high number of women claiming to be possessed. In 2015 only a few quarries were still being exploited.

== Climate ==
Morzine has a humid continental climate (Köppen climate classification Dfb) closely bordering on a subarctic climate (Dfc).

Climate data for Morzine (Le Plénay), 1515m (1991−2020 normals, extremes 1995−present)
Month	Jan	Feb	Mar	Apr	May	Jun	Jul	Aug	Sep	Oct	Nov	Dec	Year
Record high °C (°F)	17.2 (63.0)	16.8 (62.2)	16.3 (61.3)	21.4 (70.5)	25.7 (78.3)	30.2 (86.4)	29.9 (85.8)	29.5 (85.1)	24.9 (76.8)	22.3 (72.1)	18.3 (64.9)	14.9 (58.8)	30.2 (86.4)
Mean daily maximum °C (°F)	1.9 (35.4)	2.1 (35.8)	4.9 (40.8)	8.5 (47.3)	12.6 (54.7)	16.9 (62.4)	18.6 (65.5)	18.3 (64.9)	14.5 (58.1)	11.1 (52.0)	5.4 (41.7)	2.7 (36.9)	9.8 (49.6)
Daily mean °C (°F)	−1.0 (30.2)	−1.1 (30.0)	1.5 (34.7)	5.0 (41.0)	9.0 (48.2)	13.1 (55.6)	14.7 (58.5)	14.6 (58.3)	11.1 (52.0)	7.9 (46.2)	2.7 (36.9)	−0.1 (31.8)	6.5 (43.6)
Mean daily minimum °C (°F)	−3.8 (25.2)	−4.4 (24.1)	−1.8 (28.8)	1.5 (34.7)	5.3 (41.5)	9.2 (48.6)	10.8 (51.4)	11.0 (51.8)	7.8 (46.0)	4.7 (40.5)	−0.1 (31.8)	−2.8 (27.0)	3.1 (37.6)
Record low °C (°F)	−17.0 (1.4)	−22.1 (−7.8)	−15.6 (3.9)	−11.1 (12.0)	−6.0 (21.2)	−2.6 (27.3)	1.6 (34.9)	2.1 (35.8)	−2.4 (27.7)	−7.9 (17.8)	−13.3 (8.1)	−16.5 (2.3)	−22.1 (−7.8)
Average precipitation mm (inches)	161.1 (6.34)	125.1 (4.93)	137.7 (5.42)	122.2 (4.81)	158.8 (6.25)	145.4 (5.72)	156.3 (6.15)	159.5 (6.28)	122.3 (4.81)	140.9 (5.55)	135.0 (5.31)	171.2 (6.74)	1,735.5 (68.31)
Average precipitation days (≥ 1.0 mm)	12.3	10.6	11.6	11.5	14.7	12.4	12.1	12.6	10.1	11.2	11.3	12.1	142.5
Source: Meteociel

== Population ==
Historical population
Year	Pop.	±% p.a.
1968	2,340	—
1975	2,554	+1.26%
1982	2,838	+1.52%
1990	2,967	+0.56%
1999	2,948	−0.07%
2007	2,937	−0.05%
2012	2,889	−0.33%
2017	2,785	−0.73%
2023	2,658	−0.77%
Source: INSEE

== Summer sports ==
Morzine also hosts summer activities such as mountain biking, golfing, walking and caving. The resort also boasts an Olympic sized swimming pool.

=== Mountain biking ===
Local trails are generally single track and with varying levels of difficulty available from steep, rooty and technical to fast open downhill tracks. There is also a small amount of Northshore available in the Chatel Bike Park area.

Morzine is also within easy reach of other resorts including Avoriaz, Morgins, Châtel and Les Gets. The resorts of Pila, Verbier and Les Arcs lie within easy reach by car thus giving access to several places to ride.

A single lift pass can be purchased to cover the whole of the Portes du Soleil area and costs much less than during the winter months.

=== Tour de France ===
Morzine has hosted Tour de France stage finishes on several occasions, thanks in part to the proximity of the notoriously steep Col de Joux-Plane climb.

Morzine was the finale of the first mountain stage in the 2003 Tour de France. Stage seven's yellow jersey (for the leader of the general classification) and polka dot jersey (for the leader of the mountains classification) were awarded to Richard Virenque of France's Quick-Step–Davitamon team. Stage 17 of the 2006 Tour de France ended in Morzine, where Floyd Landis did the impossible and gutted out one of the most memorable stage wins in Tour history during the height of the 1992–2012 doping-era. The town was also the starting point for Stage 18. In the 2010 Tour de France Morzine was the finishing location for stage 8.

Morzine again featured in the 2016 Tour de France as the finish for stage 20 – Megève to Morzine.

On the 11 and 12 July 2022, the tour visited Morzine again, when it hosted the second rest day of the tour and the start of stage 10.

=== Football ===
Morzine is home to the annual French Mountain Villages Football Tournament (Tournoi des Montagnes), where the junior teams compete for a trophy each June.

== Winter sports ==
=== Ice hockey ===
The town is home to the Morzine-Avoriaz Penguins, an ice hockey team which reached the Ligue Magnus final in 2006, but nowadays plays in the country's minor leagues.

=== Skiing and snowboarding ===
The intermediate terrain makes the area well suited to beginners and less-seasoned skiers and snowboarders, which has led to the resort being especially popular with families. However more challenging slopes can be found at nearby Avoriaz.

Morzine is closely linked to its neighbours Avoriaz and Les Gets in that they function as linked skiing centres during the winter season. The two resorts are included in the Portes du Soleil ski area, which includes both French and Swiss villages.

== Other events ==
Since 2013, the town has hosted the Morzine Harley Days, a major motorcycle and music rally sponsored by Harley-Davidson and organized by its Harley Owners Group. The event reportedly drew 20,000 vehicles and 60,000 fans in 2019.

== Local transport ==
The closest airport to Morzine is Geneva Cointrin International Airport, Switzerland. Although there is no rail service directly to Morzine the two closest stations are at Thonon-les-Bains and Cluses, and from these stations local buses are available to the town.

== See also ==
- Communes of the Haute-Savoie department
