= Comité International du Ski-Alpinisme de Compétition =

The Comité International du Ski-Alpinisme de Compétition (CISAC) was the international committee of competition ski mountaineering and was founded in 1991.

Founding members were France, Italy, Spain, Andorra, Slovakia and Switzerland. The organization organized the first European Cup and the first European Championship of Skimountaineering in 1992. In 1999 the CISAC was merged into the International Council for Ski Mountaineering Competitions (ISMC) of the Union Internationale des Associations d'Alpinisme (UIAA).

In 1988, there started the negotiations which gave place, a few years later, to the creation of an independent committee: CISAC (International Committee of Ski Mountaineering of Competition). Its aim was to agglutinate those countries interested in Ski Mountaineering of competition, being its first president Mr. Sasanyani.

In its origins, CISAC's presence was significant since during many years it made possible the spread of Ski Mountaineering of competition, assembling the best mountain skiers, and also potentiating the European Cup, a prestigious competition whose final result was the sum of many races done at the winter season in different alpine zones.
