= Andrés Jorquera Tapia =

Chilean ski mountaineer (born 1976)

Personal information
- Born: January 19, 1976 (age 50)

Sport
- Sport: Skiing
Medal record
Men's ski mountaineering
Representing Chile
South American Championship
Bronze medal – third place	2005 San Carlos de Bariloche	Individual

Andrés Jorquera Tapia (born January 19, 1976) is a Chilean ski mountaineer and high mountain guide. Since 2005, he has been instructor at the national mountaineering school (Spanish: Escuela Nacional de Montaña - ENAM).

Joquera Tapia attended the Juan Bosco college of the Salesianos Alameda in Santiago. Afterwards he studied metallurgy at Universidad de Santiago de Chile, and lectures administration in ecotourism at Universidad Andrés Bello.

In 2005, he participated at the 2005 South American Ski Mountaineering Championship, and won Bronze
