= La Chapelle-d'Abondance =

- Commune
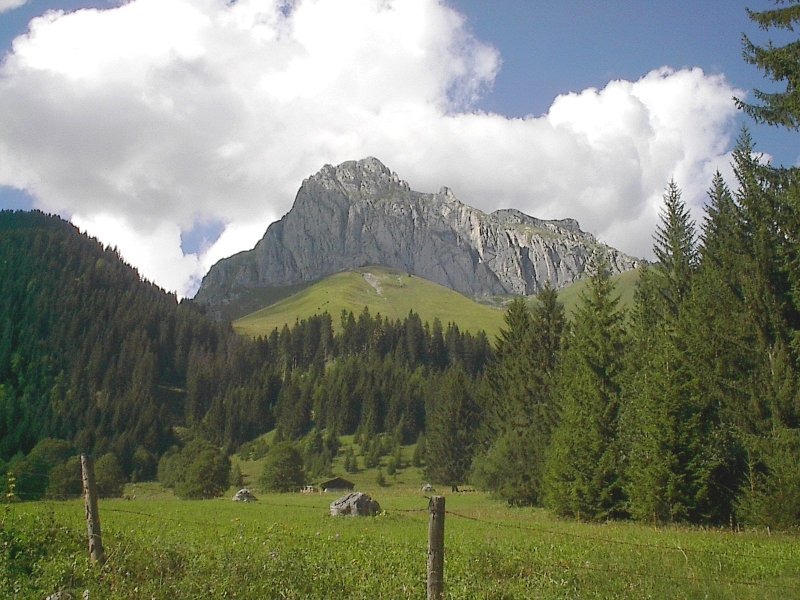
- Cornettes de Bise at 2,432 m (7,979 ft)

- Coat of arms
- Location of La Chapelle-d'Abondance
- Location within France Location within Auvergne-Rhône-Alpes
- Coordinates: 46°17′46″N 6°47′17″E
- Country: France
- Region: Auvergne-Rhône-Alpes
- Department: Haute-Savoie
- Arrondissement: Thonon-les-Bains
- Canton: Évian-les-Bains
- Intercommunality: Pays d'Évian Vallée d'Abondance

Government
  - Mayor (2020–2026): Gérald David-Cruz
- Area^{1}: 37.85 km^{2} (14.61 sq mi)
- Highest elevation: 2,430 m (7,970 ft)
- Lowest elevation: 975 m (3,199 ft)
- Population (2023): 872
  - Density: 23.0/km^{2} (59.7/sq mi)
- Time zone: UTC+01:00 (CET)
  - Summer (DST): UTC+02:00 (CEST)
- INSEE/Postal code: 74058 /74360
- ^{1} French Land Register data, which excludes lakes, ponds, glaciers > 1 km^{2} (0.386 sq mi or 247 acres) and river estuaries.

La Chapelle-d'Abondance (French pronunciation: [la ʃapɛl dabɔ̃dɑ̃s]) is a commune in the Haute-Savoie department in the Auvergne-Rhône-Alpes region in south-eastern France.

Located in the northern French Alps, the village lies at the heart of a farming valley in Haute-Savoie. Nestling below the peaks of the "Cornettes de Bise" and the "Mont de Grange" which rise to almost 2,400 metres (7,900 ft), the Abondance Valley is a verdant mountain pasture amongst the Alpine Peaks of the Chablais Massif. The waters of the River Dranse run through the valley, enriching the fertile pasture land before flowing out into Lac Leman (Lake Geneva) near Evian. There are opportunities for rafting lower down the Dranse, where the sluice gates are opened each day to let a torrent of water down the river,

In the winter, La Chapelle d'Abondance is a winter sports playground. On the edge of the massive Portes du Soleil with access via the Panthiaz telecabine. La Chapelle d'Abondance has accommodation ranging from gîtes to chambres d'hôtes; several independently run, fully catered ski chalets offer accommodation and meals.

La Chapelle d'Abondance has its own ski areas and ESF ski school for all levels:

Cret Beni ski area – height of top lift 1536 m: In the shadow of the Mont de Grange (2432 m) is the Cret Beni ski area. The pistes are north facing so ensure good snow conditions for skiing and boarding. There are mountain restaurants offering local cuisine.

Braitaz ski area – height of top lift 1792 m: A cable car gives access to the south facing ski area. It is possible to ski to Torgon in Switzerland or ski towards the Super Chatel domain and the vast Portes du Soleil ski area.

Nordic Skiing is also a popular pastime in the area. The valley has 35 km of Nordic Skiing linking Chatel, La Chapelle and Abondance. Equipment can be hired from the ski hire shops in the village.

There are also horse-drawn sleigh rides, sledging and husky dog sleds.

In summer, the network of more than 720 km (450 mi) of marked paths provides walkers the opportunity to explore easy riverside paths, or find tranquility and solitude high in the mountains above, where local ski lifts allow easy access to paths which cross the border between France and Switzerland.

Other activities include river fishing and riding the Portes du Soleil mountain bike trails.

Wildlife abounds in the valley from deer, wild boar and stags roaming the hills, to marmots sleeping on sun warmed mountain banks. There is a deer sanctuary tucked behind the old mill above the town center.

== Transport ==
La Chapelle-d'Abondance is located 70 km (43 mi), or 90 minutes' drive, from Geneva airport.

== See also ==
- Communes of the Haute-Savoie department
