= Carrizalillo (caldera) =

Caldera in Chile

Coordinates: 27°35′S 69°52′W

Carrizalillo is a caldera in Chile. It is located in the Central Volcanic Zone and is part of the Paleocene-Eocene volcanic belt. The caldera is located 50 kilometres (31 mi) southwest of Copiapo. It is heavily eroded. Active during the Cretaceous, it is a large caldera. Post-collapse activity generated subsidiary calderas inside the older main caldera.

== Geology ==
The caldera has dimensions of 58 by 32 kilometres (36 mi × 20 mi) with a north-northeast axis. The caldera has a surface area of 1,400 square kilometres (540 sq mi), bounded by the Quebrada San Miguel to the north and Lomas Bayas in the south. Two fault zones — La Ternera and San Antonio — cut the caldera. Inside the caldera 3,000 metres (9,800 ft) thick layers of lava, pyroclastic flows and sediments. A pluton, Cabeza de Vaca, lies in the southern and eastern sectors of the caldera and has dimensions of 52 by 1–7 kilometres (32.31 mi × 0.62 mi–4.35 mi). Within the caldera several smaller calderas formed, from north to south Caldera Cerro Puquios, Caldera Bellavista, Caldera Agua Nueva, Caldera El Durazno and Caldera Lomas Bayas. The Puquios caldera partly overlaps the Carrizalillo caldera margin. These subsidiary calderas have left lava conduits, lacustrine and intrusive structures and other geomorphologic features. The caldera is constructed in the terrain of the San Antonio formation, which forms megabreccia in the caldera.

=== Subsidiary calderas ===
The Lomas Bayas caldera (diameter 13 kilometres (8.1 mi)) cuts into the pre-main caldera basement. 400 metres (1,300 ft) of pumice and breccia lie in the caldera and 80 metres (260 ft) of lacustrine deposits. 150 metres (490 ft) thick pyroclastic flows from Caldera Durazno entered the Lomas Bayas caldera. The Caldera Durazno is a 12 kilometres (7.5 mi) wide semicircle that is filled by eruption-associated pyroclastics and postcaldera lava flows. The Caldera Agua Nueva lies northeast of Durazno and is filled with a 50 metres (160 ft) thick post-Carrizalillo ignimbrites. The Bellavista caldera is similar to the other calderas and also forms an arc with a diameter of 12 kilometres (7.5 mi). Trachyandesitic banks lie on its western margin, and in the caldera lies a deposit of welded pumice 600 metres (2,000 ft) thick. It contains lithic fragments including monzonite, likely formed from blocks sagging into the caldera.

== Eruption history ==
The Hornitos basin is the precursor of the caldera, and the Lavas de Sierra La Dichosa form a precaldera stage. During the Cretaceous-Paleocene a group of stratovolcanoes formed in the area. Their eruption products are basalt and trachybasalt containing olivine and pyroxene. Magmatic intrusion triggered the formation of ring faults which then allowed the eruption of pyroclastic flows during caldera collapse. After the collapse, dacitic lava flows in the central sector of the caldera form the first postcollapse volcanism. Reestablishment of the volcanic system was strong enough to form another sequence, 1,100 metres (3,600 ft) thick, of pumice and pyroclastics, possibly the consequence of another caldera collapse. The Cabeza de Vaca pluton formed within the caldera, using the western caldera rim and the annular fracture. Activity occurred in the Paleocene-Eocene, with the pluton dated 63–59.8 mya. The subsidiary calderas are dated 48-56 mya.

== Petrology ==
Rhyolitic pyroclastic flows were erupted during the caldera collapse. They contain devitrified fiammes and lack lithic fragments. The lack of fragments and the overall homogeneity indicates that the deposits were placed in short succession. Postcaldera flows are dacites which that are derived from the deeper portions of the magma chamber. Cabeza de Vaca contains granodiorite, granite and monzonite as well as tourmaline breccias containing Cu-Au minerals. The Lomas Bayas-El Durazno mining district is associated with the caldera.

== See also ==
- Jorquera
