= International Council for Ski Mountaineering Competitions =

International organization

The International Council for Ski Mountaineering Competitions (ISMC) located in the Floridablanca 84 in Barcelona was part of the Union Internationale des Associations d'Alpinisme (UIAA) and responsible for ski mountaineering and vertical race competitions. The ISMC, which was founded in 1999 as follow-up institution of the Comité International du Ski-Alpinisme de Compétition (CISAC), merged into the International Ski Mountaineering Federation (ISMF) in 2008.

== ISMC competitions ==
- European Cups of Ski Mountaineering since 1992
- European Championships of Ski Mountaineering since 2001, prior by the CISAC since 1992
- World Championships of Ski Mountaineering since 2002
- World Cups of Ski Mountaineering since 2004

Age classes:

- Cadets (16–18 years)
- Juniors (19–20 years)
- Contenders(21–23 years)
- Seniors (> 23 years)

== Members of the UIAA-ISMC ==
Country	National union	Remarks
Andorra	Federació Andorrana de Muntanyisme	
Argentina	Federación Argentina de Ski y Andinismo	
Austria	ASKIMO	since October 2007; not entitled to vote
Austria	Verband Alpiner Vereine Österreichs	
Belgium	Club Alpin Belge	
Bulgaria	Bulgarian Alpine Club	
Canada	Alpine Club of Canada	
Chile	Federación de Andinismo de Chile	
China	Chinese Mountaineering Association	
Czech Republic	Český Horolezecký Svaz	
Denmark	Dansk Bjergklub	
France	Club Alpin Français	not entitled to vote
France	French Federation of Mountaineering and Climbing	
Germany	German Alpine Club	
Greece	Hellenic Federation of Mountaineering and Climbing	
Iran	I.R.Iran Mountaineering Federation	
Italy	Club Alpino Italiano	not entitled to vote
Italy	Federazione Italiana Sport Invernali	
Japan	Japan Mountaineering Association	
Liechtenstein	Liechtensteiner Alpenverein	
Morocco	Fédération Royale Marocaine de Ski et Montagne	
Poland	Polski Związek Alpinizmu	
Romania	Romanian Federation of Mountaineering and Climbing	
Russia	Union of Mountaineers and Climbers of Russia	
Switzerland	Schweizer Alpen-Club	
Singapore	Singapore Mountaineering Federation	
Slovakia	Slovak Alpinist Union JAMES	
Slovenia	Planinska Zveza Slovenije	
Spain	Federació d'Entitats Excursionistes de Catalunya	not entitled to vote
Spain	Federación Española de Deportes de Montaña y Escalada	
Spain	Centre Excursionista de Catalunya	not entitled to vote
South Korea	Korean Alpine Federation	
United States	American Alpine Club	
