= Champéry =

- Municipality
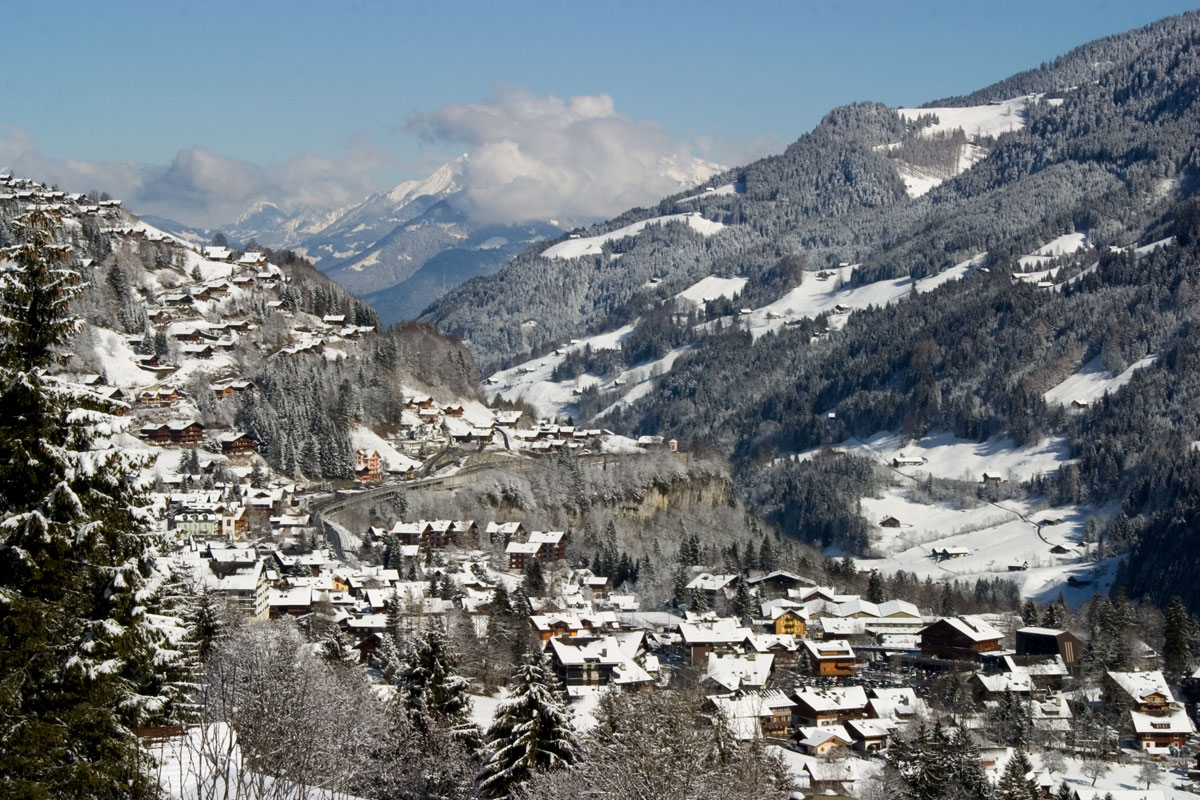
- Champéry village

- Flag Coat of arms
- Location of Champéry
- Location within Switzerland Location within Canton of Valais
- Coordinates: 46°11′N 6°52′E
- Country: Switzerland
- Canton: Valais
- District: Monthey

Government
  - Mayor: Jacques Berra

Area
  - Total: 39.0 km^{2} (15.1 sq mi)
- Elevation: 1,055 m (3,461 ft)

Population (December 2002)
  - Total: 1,181
  - Density: 30.3/km^{2} (78.4/sq mi)
- Time zone: UTC+01:00 (CET)
  - Summer (DST): UTC+02:00 (CEST)
- Postal code: 1874
- SFOS number: 6151
- ISO 3166 code: CH-VS
- Surrounded by: Evionnaz, Montriond (FR-74), Morzine (FR-74), Samoëns (FR-74), Sixt-Fer-à-Cheval (FR-74), Val-d'Illiez
- Website: www.champery.ch

Champéry (French pronunciation: [ʃɑ̃peʁi]; Arpitan: Champérié) is a municipality in the district of Monthey in the canton of Valais in Switzerland.

== History ==
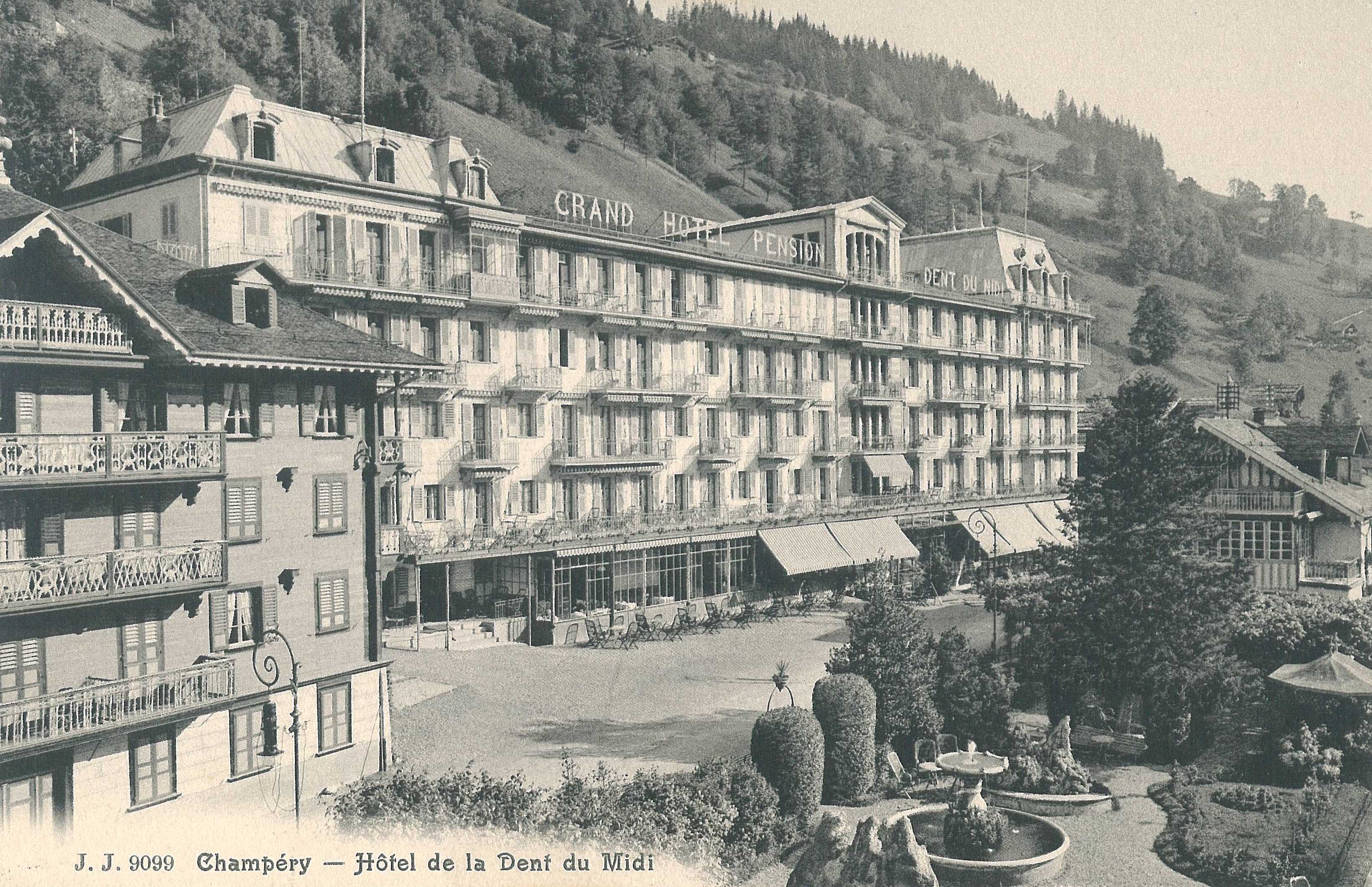
Hôtel de la Dent-du-Midi

Champéry is first mentioned in 1286 as Champery.

The Hotel Dent-du-Midi opened in 1857. In 1969, Champéry became one of the founding villages of the Portes du Soleil ski area and resort.

== Geography ==
Champéry has an area, as of 2011, of 39 square kilometers (15 mi^{2}). Of this area, 32.7% is used for agricultural purposes, while 33.4% is forested. Of the rest of the land, 3.6% is settled (buildings or roads) and 30.3% is unproductive land.

The municipality is located in the Monthey district, in the Val-d'Illiez, on the French border. It consists of the linear village of Champéry, which was part of the municipality of Val-d'Illiez until 1839 when it became independent.

== Coat of arms ==
The blazon of the municipal coat of arms is Quartered Argent issuant from three Mounts Vert as many Pine Trees of the same trunked proper and Azure statant on ground Or a man proper clad of the same troused Argent holding a bag of the same sowing seeds Or from it.

== Demographics ==
Champéry has a population (as of December 2020) of 1,371. As of 2008, 23.0% of the population are resident foreign nationals. Over the last 10 years (2000–2010 ) the population has changed at a rate of 12.8%. It has changed at a rate of 11.7% due to migration and at a rate of 0% due to births and deaths.

Most of the population (as of 2000) speaks French (996 or 90.0%) as their first language, German is the second most common (26 or 2.3%) and English is the third (24 or 2.2%). There are 9 people who speak Italian.

As of 2008, the population was 51.9% male and 48.1% female. The population was made up of 504 Swiss men (39.5% of the population) and 158 (12.4%) non-Swiss men. There were 473 Swiss women (37.1%) and 140 (11.0%) non-Swiss women. Of the population in the municipality, 509 or about 46.0% were born in Champéry and lived there in 2000. There were 168 or 15.2% who were born in the same canton, while 192 or 17.3% were born somewhere else in Switzerland, and 201 or 18.2% were born outside of Switzerland.

As of 2000, children and teenagers (0–19 years old) make up 22.4% of the population, while adults (20–64 years old) make up 60% and seniors (over 64 years old) make up 17.6%.

As of 2000, there were 436 people who were single and never married in the municipality. There were 551 married individuals, 62 widows or widowers and 58 individuals who are divorced.

As of 2000, there were 458 private households in the municipality, and an average of 2.3 persons per household. There were 160 households that consist of only one person and 31 households with five or more people. In 2000, a total of 433 apartments (28.3% of the total) were permanently occupied, while 1,008 apartments (65.8%) were seasonally occupied and 91 apartments (5.9%) were empty. As of 2009, the construction rate of new housing units was 23.5 new units per 1000 residents. The vacancy rate for the municipality, in 2010, was 1.68%.

The historical population is given in the following chart:

== Politics ==
In the 2007 federal election the most popular party was the CVP which received 35.76% of the vote. The next three most popular parties were the FDP (25.7%), the SVP (20.71%) and the SP (9.8%). In the federal election, a total of 464 votes were cast, and the voter turnout was 54.0%.

In the 2009 Conseil d'État/Staatsrat election a total of 393 votes were cast, of which 26 or about 6.6% were invalid. The voter participation was 49.9%, which is similar to the cantonal average of 54.67%. In the 2007 Swiss Council of States election a total of 446 votes were cast, of which 23 or about 5.2% were invalid. The voter participation was 55.7%, which is similar to the cantonal average of 59.88%.

== Economy ==
In 2010, Champéry had an unemployment rate of 2.8%. As of 2008, there were 36 people employed in the primary economic sector and about 16 businesses involved in this sector. 43 people were employed in the secondary sector and there were 14 businesses in this sector. 400 people were employed in the tertiary sector, with 69 businesses in this sector. There were 525 residents of the municipality who were employed in some capacity, of which females made up 41.0% of the workforce.

In 2008 the total number of full-time equivalent jobs was 383. The number of jobs in the primary sector was 29, all of which were in agriculture. The number of jobs in the secondary sector was 40 of which 15 or (37.5%) were in manufacturing and 13 (32.5%) were in construction. The number of jobs in the tertiary sector was 314. In the tertiary sector; 50 or 15.9% were in wholesale or retail sales or the repair of motor vehicles, 10 or 3.2% were in the movement and storage of goods, 116 or 36.9% were in a hotel or restaurant, 2 or 0.6% were the insurance or financial industry, 2 or 0.6% were technical professionals or scientists, 57 or 18.2% were in education and 1 was in health care.

In 2000, there were 103 workers who commuted into the municipality and 196 workers who commuted away. The municipality is a net exporter of workers, with about 1.9 workers leaving the municipality for every one entering. About 4.9% of the workforce coming into Champéry are coming from outside Switzerland. Of the working population, 4.2% used public transportation to get to work, and 61% used a private car.

== Religion ==
From the 2000 census, 818 or 73.9% were Roman Catholic, while 103 or 9.3% belonged to the Swiss Reformed Church. Of the rest of the population, there were 5 members of an Orthodox church (or about 0.45% of the population), and there were 32 individuals (or about 2.89% of the population) who belonged to another Christian church. There were 7 (or about 0.63% of the population) who were Islamic. There were 3 individuals who were Buddhist and 1 individual who belonged to another church. 96 (or about 8.67% of the population) belonged to no church, are agnostic or atheist, and 55 individuals (or about 4.97% of the population) did not answer the question.

== Education ==
In Champéry about 337 or (30.4%) of the population have completed non-mandatory upper secondary education, and 136 or (12.3%) have completed additional higher education (either university or a Fachhochschule). Of the 136 who completed tertiary schooling, 48.5% were Swiss men, 20.6% were Swiss women, 16.9% were non-Swiss men and 14.0% were non-Swiss women.

As of 2000, there was one student in Champéry who came from another municipality, while 77 residents attended schools outside the municipality.

== Sport ==
=== Winter ===
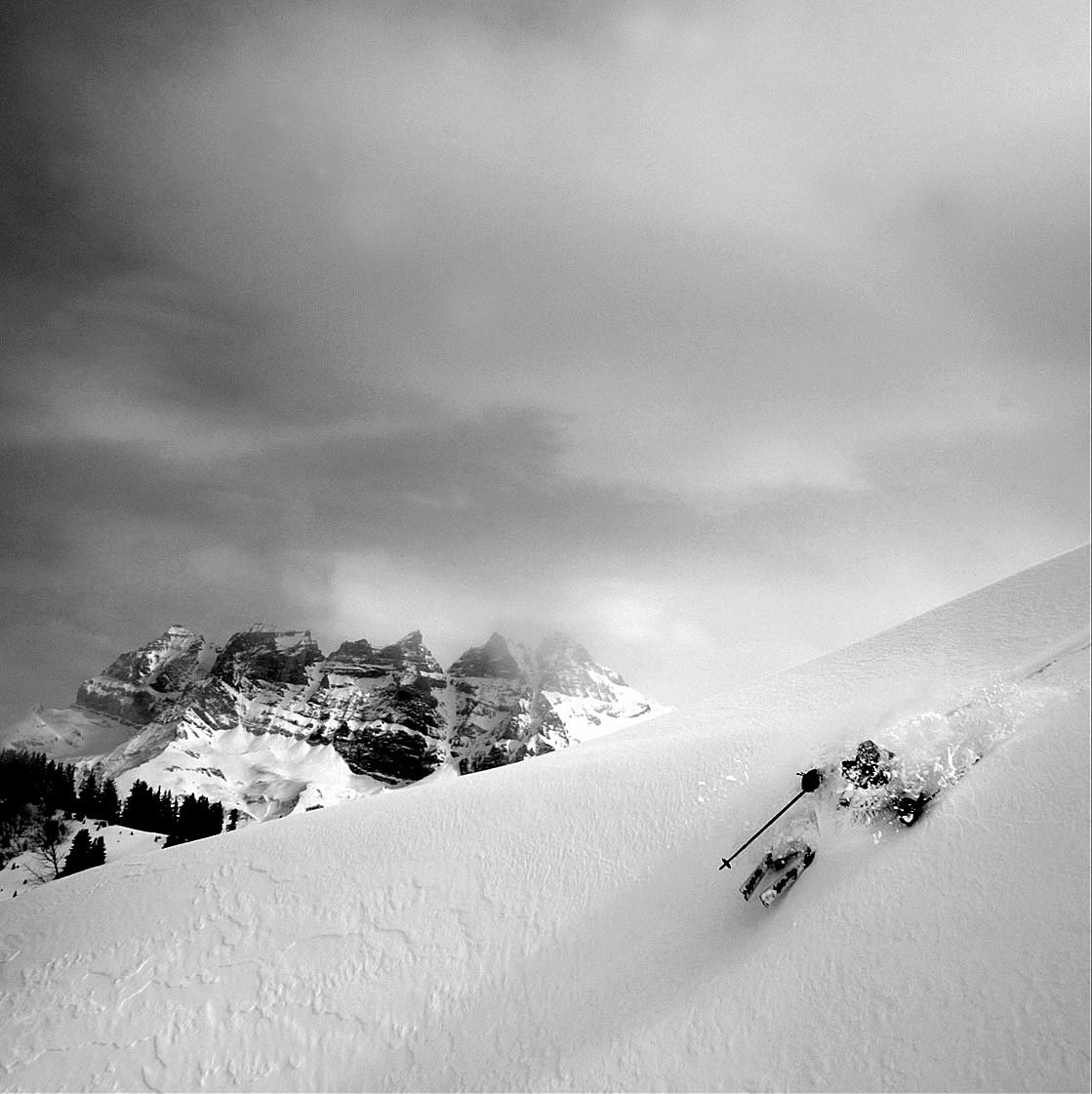
A skier with the Dents du Midi in the background

The Champéry – Planachaux cable car (125 passengers) and the new 6-seater chairlift in Grand-Paradis take skiers to the Portes du Soleil recreational area, at an altitude of 2,000 m (6,600 ft). With 194 ski lifts and over 650 km (400 mi) of ski slopes, this is the largest international ski area in the world.

Champéry is home to the Skating School Of Switzerland, founded by Swiss Figure Skater Stéphane Lambiel. Champery also has one of the steepest ski slopes in the world which Red Bull made a competition on it.

=== Summer ===
The Portes du Soleil recreational area keeps 24 chairlifts open for the summer, giving access to over 600 km (370 mi) of paths. The Dents du Midi and the Dents Blanches mountain ridges also offer walks and hikes. Champéry's Palladium, the National Centre for Ice Sports, offers indoor and outdoor activities and regularly hosts national and international ice-sports training camps and competitions.

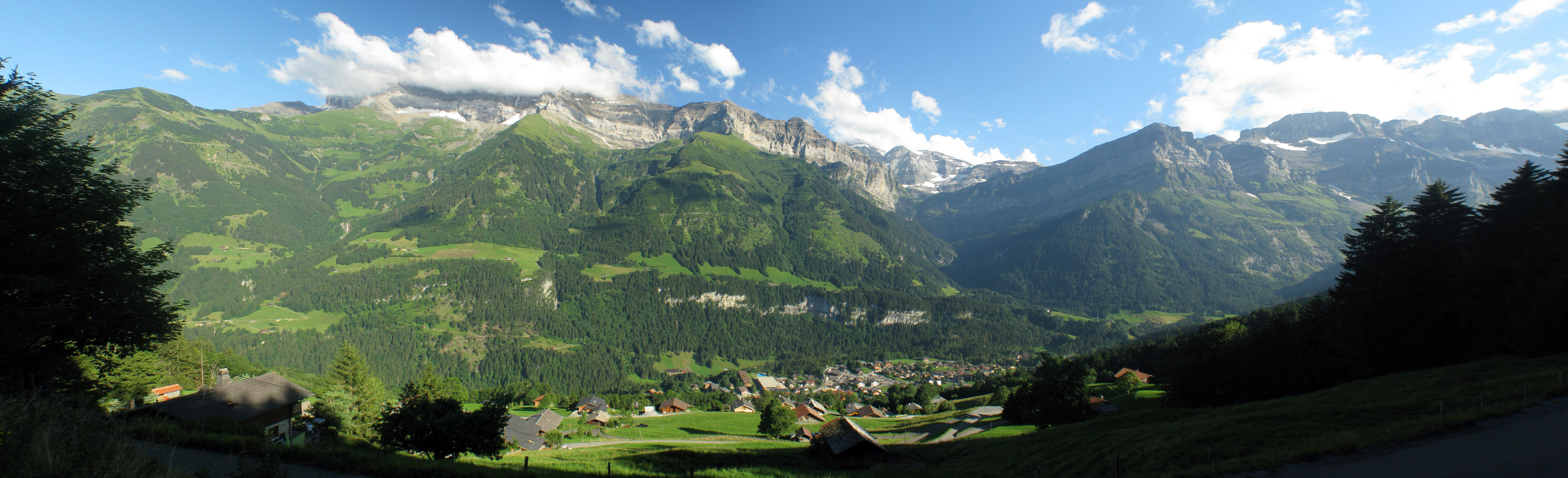
Champery, with Dents du Midi (left) and Mont Ruan (center)

== Transport ==
Champéry is on the Aigle–Ollon–Monthey–Champéry railway line (AOMC): Aigle – Ollon – Monthey – Champéry. Aigle is a town on the Swiss Federal Railway and allows train connections to Geneva, Bern, and Basel.

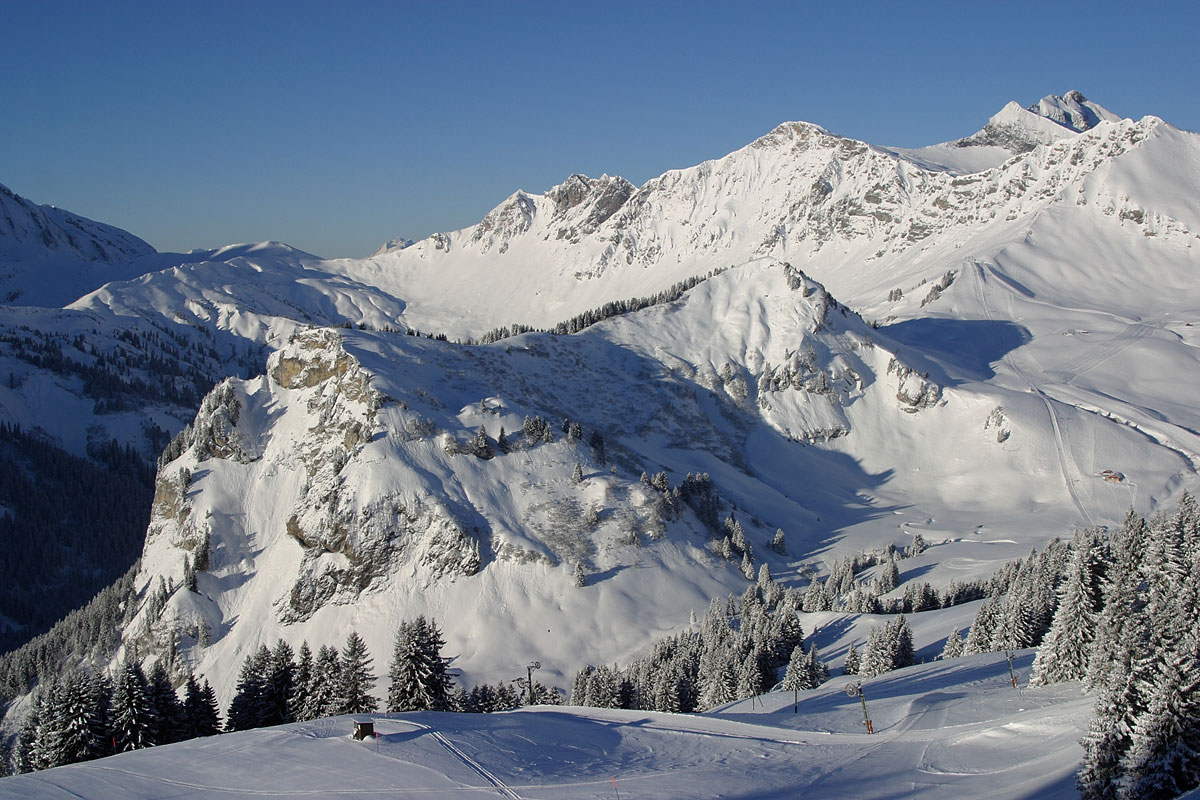

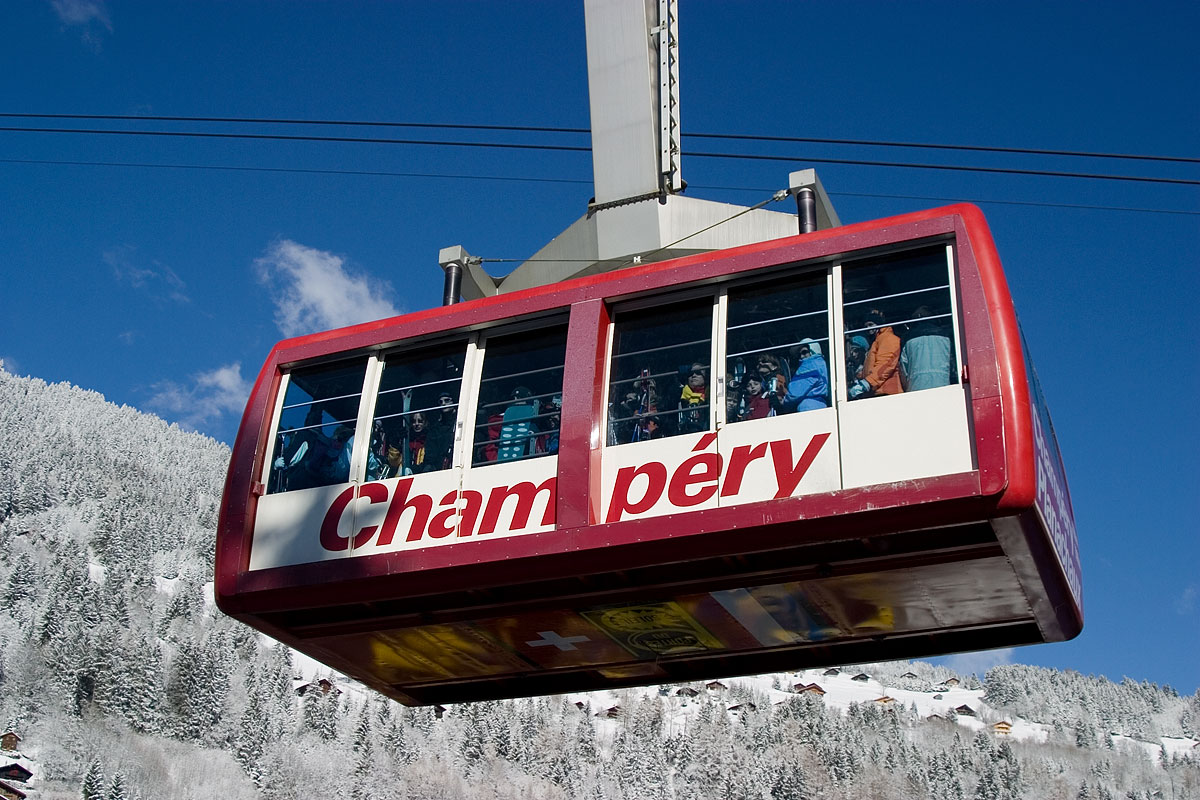

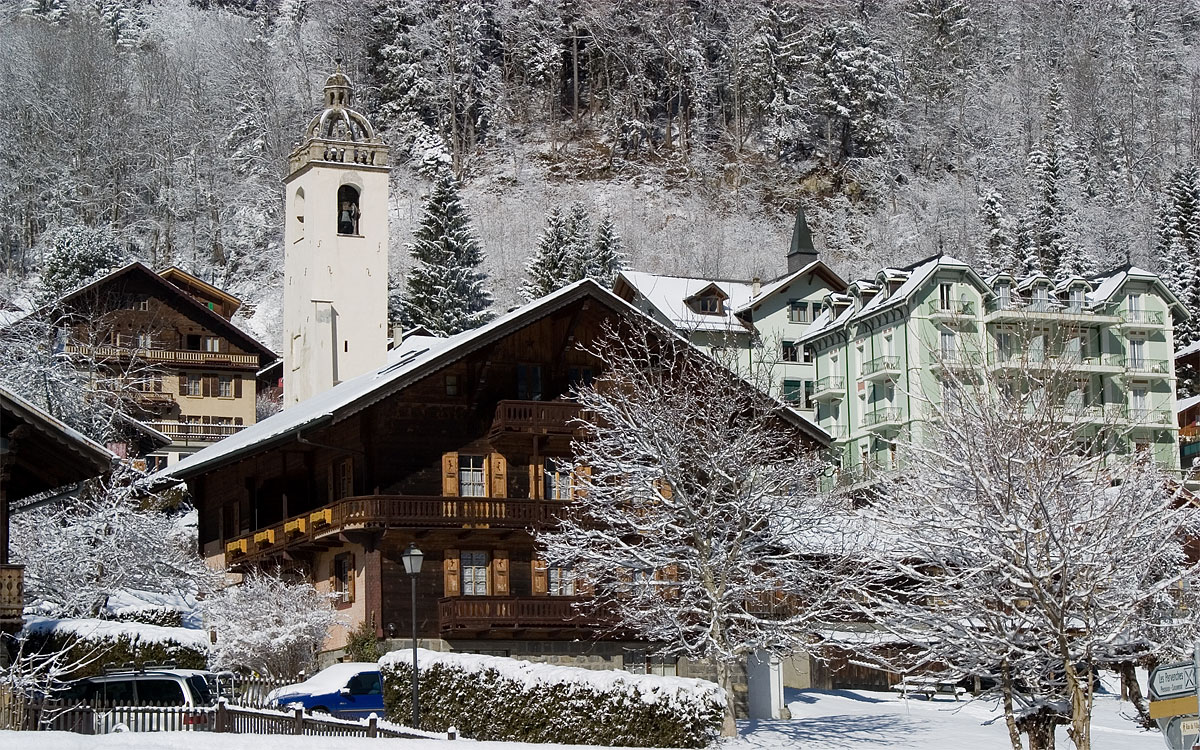
