= Avoriaz =

French mountain resort in Haute-Savoie

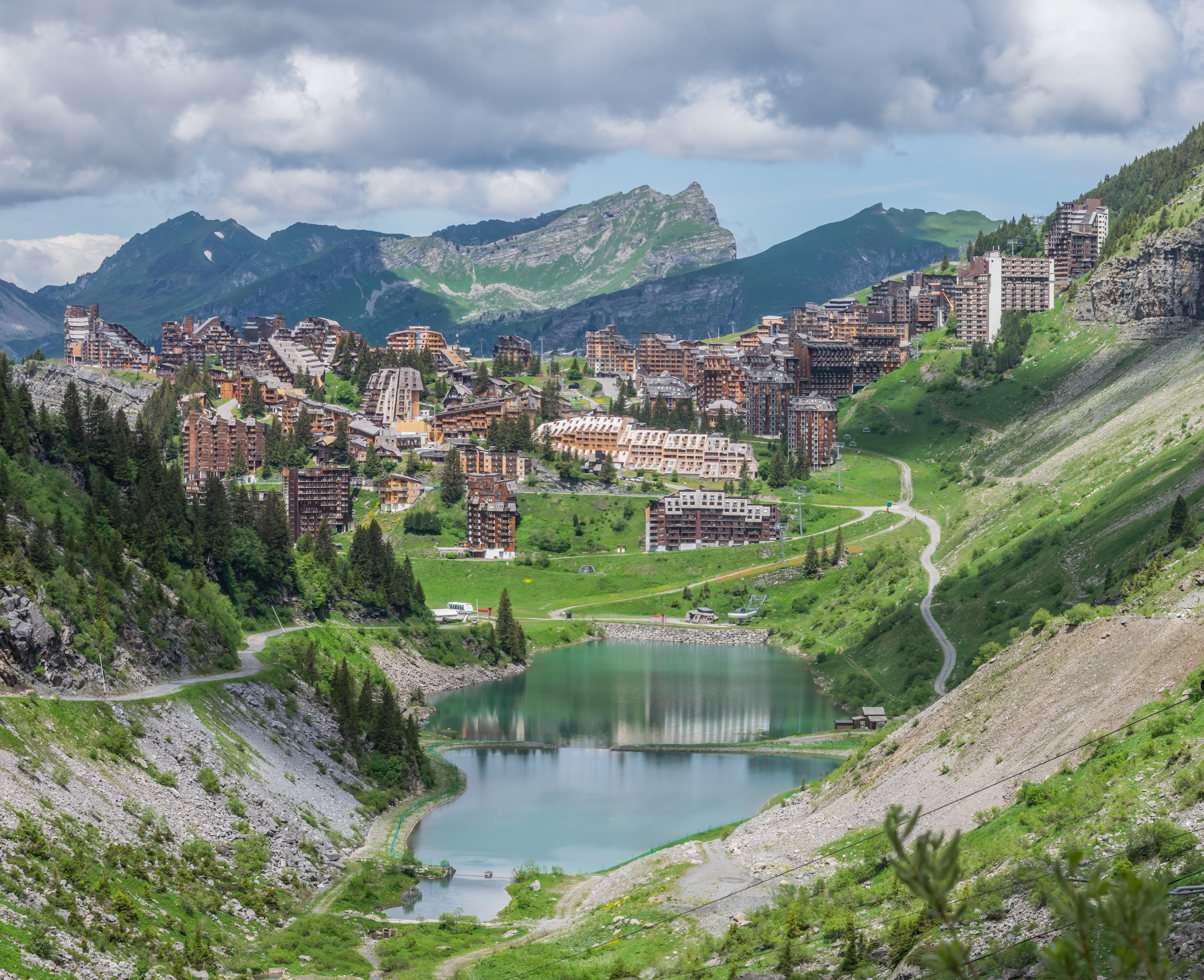
- Avoriaz Resort

- Location within France Location within Auvergne-Rhône-Alpes Location within Alps
- Location: Morzine, Haute-Savoie, Auvergne-Rhône-Alpes, France
- Nearest major city: Geneva, Switzerland
- Coordinates: 46°11′27″N 6°46′30″E
- Top elevation: 2,466 m (8,091 ft)
- Base elevation: 1,100 m (3,600 ft)
- Skiable area: 130 km (81 mi) (Avoriaz); 650 km (400 mi) (Portes du Soleil)
- Trails: 51 (Avoriaz) 283 (Portes du Soleil)
- Longest run: 6 km (3.7 mi)
- Lift system: 34 (Avoriaz) 219 (Portes du Soleil)
- Terrain parks: 4
- Snowfall: 8 m (26 ft)
- Snowmaking: 200 cannons
- Website: www.avoriaz.com

Avoriaz (French: [avɔʁja], Franco-Provençal: [aˈvɔʁja, aˈvɔʁi]) is a French mountain resort in the Portes du Soleil in the French commune of Morzine, on a shelf above the town of Morzine.

Cars are forbidden in Avoriaz; transport includes horse-drawn sleighs and snowcats during winter.

One of the principal owners of Avoriaz is the tourism and real estate development company Pierre & Vacances.

== Resort history ==
Around 1965 former French downhill olympic champion Jean Vuarnet planned a new skiing area on the north side of the Hauts Fort mountain and the Fornet-bowl.

== Avoriaz International Fantastic Film Festival ==
For twenty years, from 1973 to 1993, Avoriaz was host to the Avoriaz International Fantastic Film Festival (French: Festival international du film fantastique d'Avoriaz), a film festival mainly devoted to science fiction and horror movies.

== Tour de France ==
Avoriaz has hosted a stage finish of the Tour de France 7 times.

== See also ==
- List of highest paved roads in Europe
- List of mountain passes
