= 2016 Tour de France =

2016 UCI World Tour, race 18 of 28
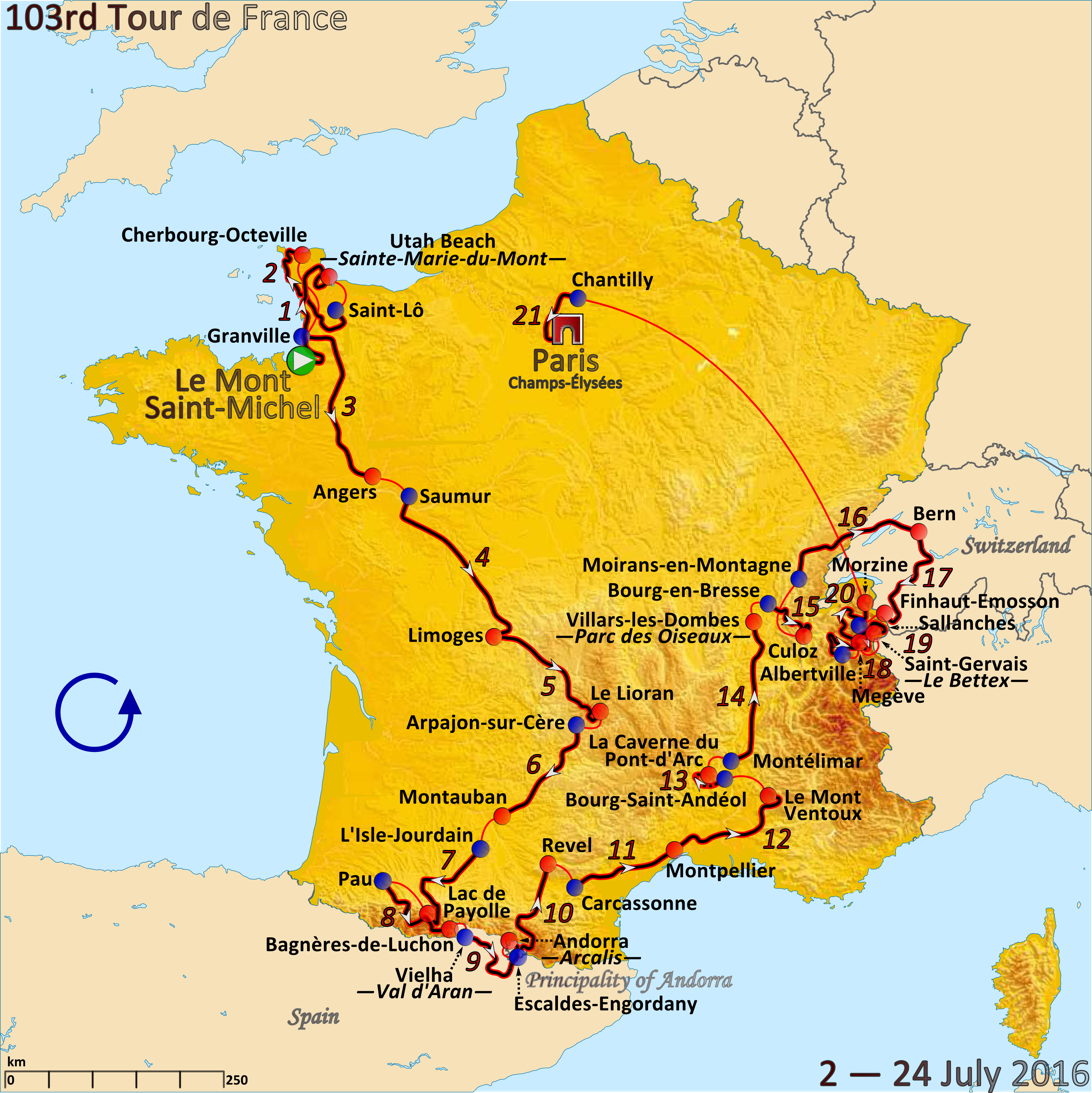
- Route of the 2016 Tour de France

Race details
- Dates: 2–24 July 2016
- Stages: 21
- Distance: 3,529 km (2,193 mi)
- Winning time: 89h 04' 48"

Results
Jersey awarded to the overall winner	Winner	Chris Froome (GBR)	(Team Sky)
	Second	Romain Bardet (FRA)	(AG2R La Mondiale)
	Third	Nairo Quintana (COL)	(Movistar Team)
Jersey awarded to the points classification winner	Points	Peter Sagan (SVK)	(Tinkoff)
Jersey awarded to the mountains classification winner	Mountains	Rafał Majka (POL)	(Tinkoff)
Jersey awarded to the youth classification winner	Youth	Adam Yates (GBR)	(Orica–BikeExchange)
Jersey awarded to the combativity classification winner	Combativity	Peter Sagan (SVK)	(Tinkoff)
Jersey awarded to the team classification winner	Team	(Spain) Movistar Team	

The 2016 Tour de France was the 103rd edition of the Tour de France, one of cycling's Grand Tours. The 3,529 km (2,193 mi)-long race consisted of 21 stages, starting on 2 July in Mont Saint-Michel, Normandy, and concluding on 24 July with the Champs-Élysées stage in Paris. A total of 198 riders from 22 teams entered the race. The overall general classification was won by Chris Froome of Team Sky, with the second and third places taken by Romain Bardet (AG2R La Mondiale) and Nairo Quintana (Movistar Team), respectively.

Mark Cavendish of Team Dimension Data won the opening stage to take the general classification leader's yellow jersey. Tinkoff rider Peter Sagan won the second stage to claim yellow and held onto it until the fifth stage when Greg Van Avermaet (BMC Racing Team) took the stage and the yellow jersey. Van Avermaet lost ground in the mountainous eighth stage, finishing over 25 minutes behind the stage winner Froome, who took the yellow jersey. Froome retained the yellow jersey through to stage 17 and extended his lead further following a strong performance in the stage 18's mountain time trial. Bardet won the mountainous 19th stage and moved into second place overall and despite crashing in the rain, Froome was able to extend his lead. He then held the lead into the finish in Paris.

The points classification was won by Sagan, who won three stages. Tinkoff's Rafał Majka won the mountains classification. Orica–BikeExchange rider Adam Yates, in fourth place overall, won the young rider classification. The team classification was won by Movistar Team and Sagan was given the award for the most combative rider. Cavendish won the most stages, with four.

== Teams ==
The number of riders per nation represented in the 2016 Tour de France: 20+ / 10–19 / 2–9 / 1

Twenty-two teams participated in the 2016 edition of the Tour de France. The race was the 18th of the 28 events in the UCI World Tour, and all of its eighteen UCI WorldTeams were automatically invited, and obliged, to attend the race. On 2 March 2016, the organiser of the Tour, Amaury Sport Organisation (ASO), announced the four second-tier UCI Professional Continental teams given wildcard invitations: Bora–Argon 18, Cofidis, Direct Énergie and Fortuneo–Vital Concept. The presentation of the teams – where the members of each team's roster are introduced in front of the media and local dignitaries – took place in the town square of Sainte-Mère-Église, Normandy, on 28 June, two days before the opening stage held in the region. Each team arrived in World War II military vehicles, commemorating the Normandy landings.

Each squad was allowed a maximum of nine riders, therefore the start list contained a total of 198 riders. Of these, 33 were competing in their first Tour de France. The riders came from 35 countries; France, Spain, the Netherlands, Belgium, Italy and Germany all had 10 or more riders in the race. Riders from ten countries won stages during the race; British riders won the largest number of stages, with seven. The average age of riders in the race was 30 years, ranging from the 22-year-old Sondre Holst Enger (IAM Cycling) to the 42-year-old Matteo Tosatto (Tinkoff). Of the total average ages, Lampre–Merida was the youngest team and Lotto–Soudal the oldest.

The teams entering the race were:

UCI WorldTeams

- AG2R La Mondiale
- Astana
- BMC Racing Team
- Cannondale–Drapac
- Team Dimension Data
- Etixx–Quick-Step
- FDJ
- Team Giant–Alpecin
- IAM Cycling
- Team Katusha
- Lampre–Merida
- Lotto–Soudal
- LottoNL–Jumbo
- Movistar Team
- Orica–BikeExchange
- Team Sky
- Tinkoff
- Trek–Segafredo

UCI Professional Continental teams

- Bora–Argon 18
- Cofidis
- Direct Énergie
- Fortuneo–Vital Concept

== Pre-race favourites ==
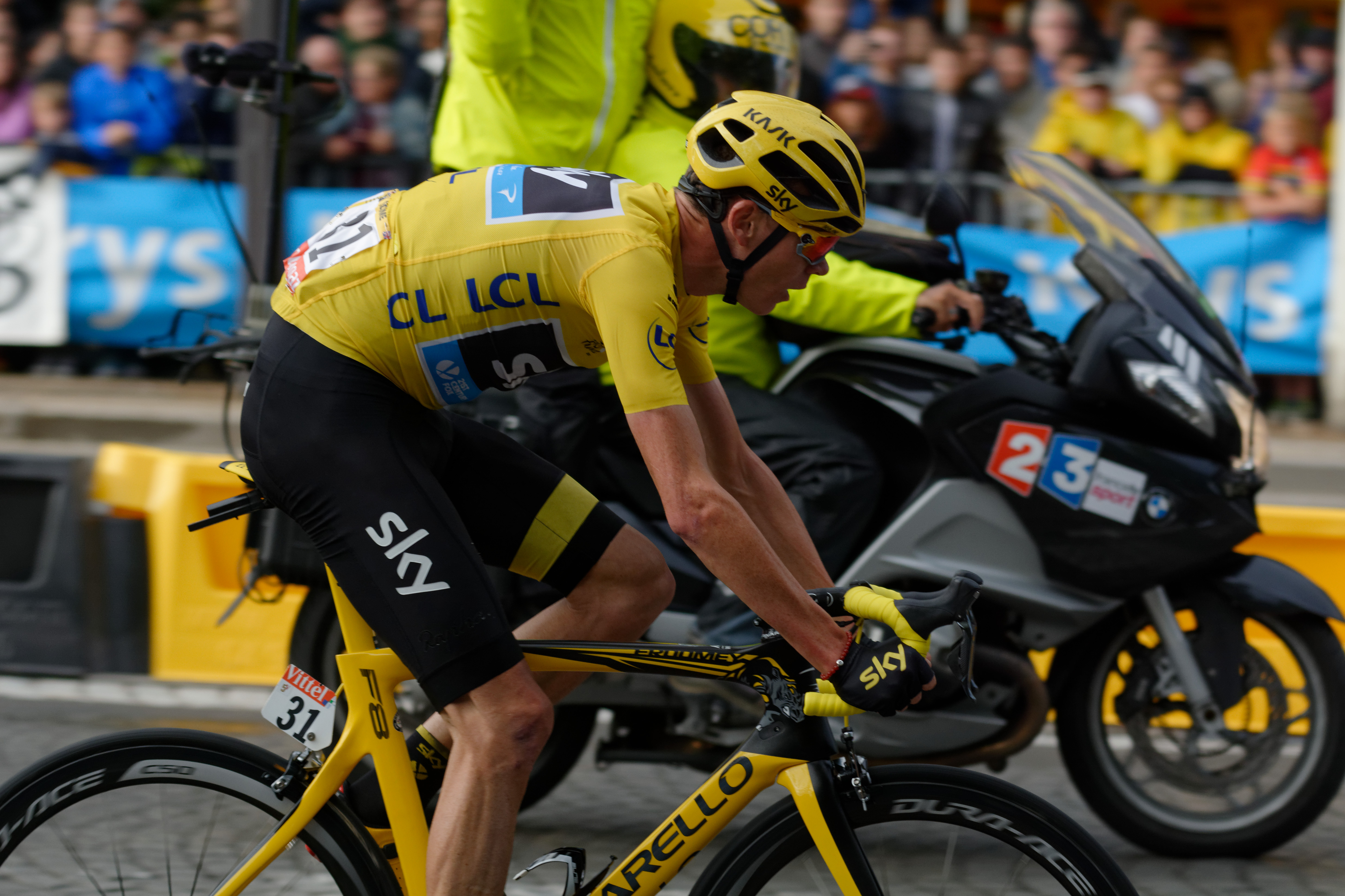
Defending champion Chris Froome of Team Sky (pictured at the 2015 Tour) was widely seen as the leading contender for the general classification.

In the run up to the 2016 Tour de France, Chris Froome (Team Sky) was seen by many as the top pre-race favourite for the general classification. His closest rivals were thought to be Nairo Quintana (Movistar Team) and Alberto Contador (Tinkoff). The other riders considered contenders for the general classification were Richie Porte (BMC Racing Team), Thibaut Pinot (FDJ), Fabio Aru (Astana), Vincenzo Nibali (Astana), who won the 2014 Tour and the 2016 Giro d'Italia, Romain Bardet (AG2R La Mondiale), and Tejay van Garderen (BMC Racing Team).

Froome, who won both the 2013 and 2015 editions of the race, had shown his form during the season with overall victories in two stage races, the Herald Sun Tour and the Critérium du Dauphiné, a race considered to be the warm-up for the Tour. The runner-up in the 2013 and 2015 Tours, Quintana, had won three stage races in the lead up to the Tour, the Volta a Catalunya, the Tour de Romandie, and the Route du Sud. Contador, winner of the 2007 and 2009 Tours, found success in stage races during the season, winning the Tour of the Basque Country and placing second at Paris–Nice and the Volta a Catalunya.

The sprinters considered favourites for the points classification and wins on the flat or hilly bunch sprint finishes were Peter Sagan (Tinkoff), Marcel Kittel (Etixx–Quick-Step), André Greipel (Lotto–Soudal), Mark Cavendish (Team Dimension Data), Alexander Kristoff (Team Katusha), John Degenkolb (Team Giant–Alpecin) and Michael Matthews (Orica–BikeExchange). Sagan, the world road race champion and winner of the points classification in the four previous Tours, had won the one-day classics, Gent–Wevelgem and the Tour of Flanders, and two stages of the Tour of California during the season before the Tour. Kittel's 2016 season had been successful up to the Tour as he had amassed a total of nine wins from sprints, most notably, two stages of the Giro and the Scheldeprijs one-day race. He also won both the general and points classifications of the Dubai Tour. Greipel's season total of wins so far was eight, with three Giro stages. Cavendish's form was not clear as his season was mostly spent training for the omnium track event at the Olympic Games the month following the Tour. Although Kristoff's total of wins in the season was eight, they were not in major races. Degenkolb had spent the majority of his season recovering from an injury and it was thought he could pose a threat. Matthews only had two wins so far in the season, both at Paris–Nice, including the race's points classification.

== Route and stages ==
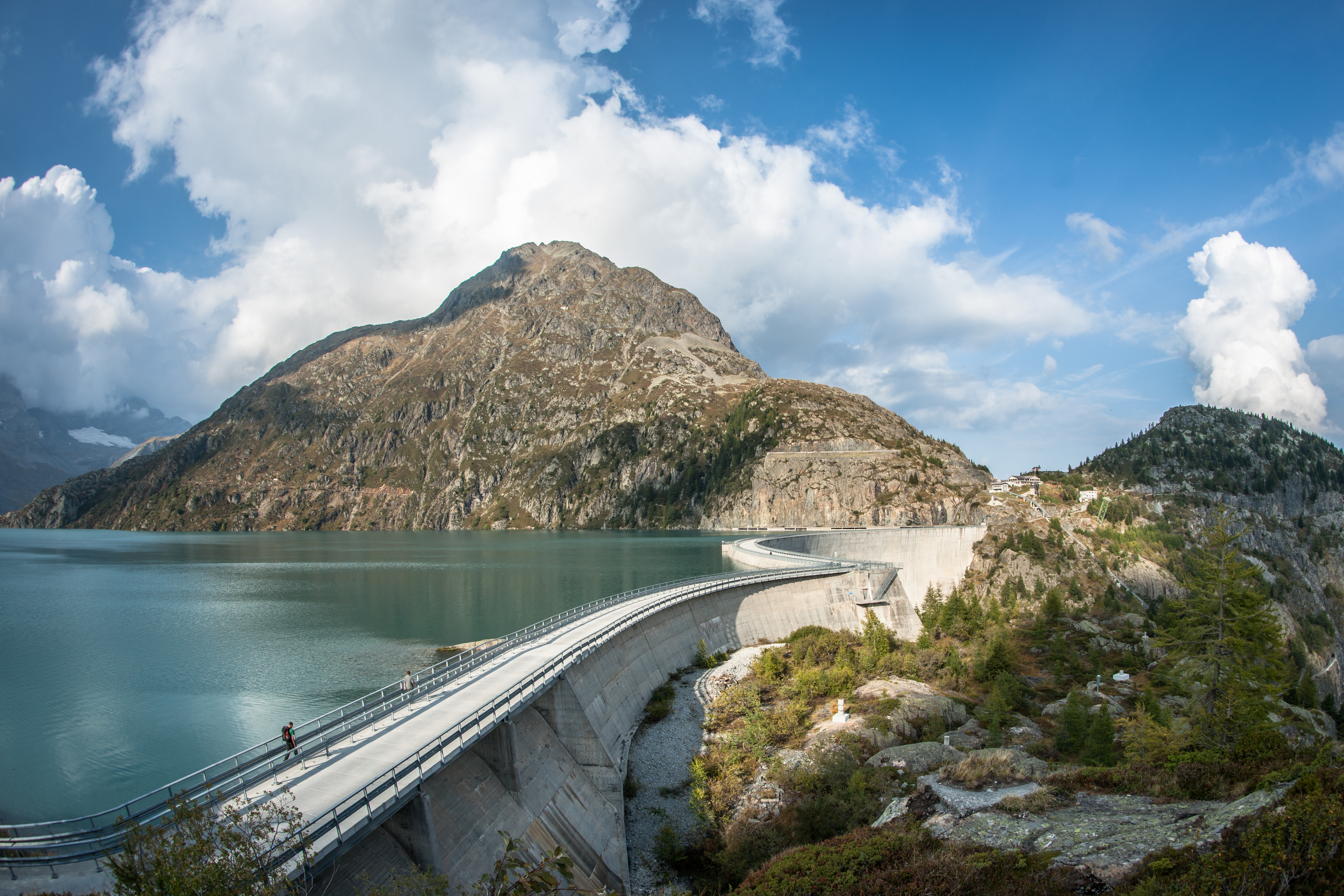
Stage seventeen concluded with a summit finish at the Émosson Dam in the Swiss Alps.

On 24 November 2014, ASO announced that for time the first time in Tour history the department of Manche would host the 2016 edition's opening stages (known as the Grand Départ), before further details of the first three stages held in Manche were released on 9 December 2014. On 15 January 2015, the organisers confirmed that the race would visit Andorra, for the fifth time in history; after the 1964, 1993, 1997 and 2009 editions. The principality hosted the finish of the ninth stage, the first rest day and start of stage ten. The entire route was unveiled by race director Christian Prudhomme on 20 October 2015 at the Palais des Congrès in Paris. The defending champion Chris Froome said after the route was announced that he expected the course to suit him better than the previous year's course. "I think it's going to take a complete cyclist – but the stage that certainly stands out for me is Mont Ventoux", he added.

The first stage started at the Mont Saint-Michel island monastery and finished north on at Utah Beach. The second stage was held between Saint-Lô and Cherbourg-en-Cotentin. The third stage left Manche in Granville and headed south to the finish in Angers. Stage four took the race further south, between Saumur and Limoges, with the fifth stage crossing the elevated region of Massif Central to the finish at the Le Lioran mountain resort. Stage six headed to Montauban before the entrance to the Pyrenees in stage seven. This mountain range also hosted two further stages: a roller-coaster stage eight and the finish in Andorra in stage nine. The following three stages, 10 to 12, crossed the south of the country eastwards to Mont Ventoux. After an individual time trial, stage 14 took the race northwards through the Rhône Valley, which was followed by a stage that took the race into the Jura Mountains. Stage 16 ended with a finish in Bern, Switzerland. The next four stages took place in and around the Alps, before a long transfer took the Tour to the finish with the Champs-Élysées stage in Paris.

There were 21 stages in the race, covering a total distance of 3,529 km (2,193 mi), 168.7 km (104.8 mi) longer than the 2015 Tour. The longest mass-start was the fourth at 237.5 km (148 mi), and stage 21 was the shortest at 113 km (70 mi). The race featured a total of 54.5 km (34 mi) in individual time trials and four summit finishes: stage 9, to Andorra-Arcalis (Andorra); stage 12, to Chalet Reynard (Mont Ventoux); (Note: Stage twelve's finish line was moved from the summit of Mont Ventoux to Chalet Reynard, 6 km (4 mi) before, due to dangerous winds.) stage 17, to Finhaut–Émosson (Switzerland); and stage 19, to Saint Gervais-les-Bains. The highest point of elevation in the race was the 2,408 m (7,900 ft)-high Port d'Envalira mountain pass on stage ten. There were seven hors catégorie (English: beyond category) rated climbs in the race. There were sixteen new stage start or finish locations. The second rest day took place in Bern after stage 15.

Stage characteristics and winners
Stage	Date	Course	Distance	Type	Winner
1	2 July	Mont Saint-Michel to Utah Beach (Sainte-Marie-du-Mont)	188 km (117 mi)	Flat stage	Mark Cavendish (GBR)
2	3 July	Saint-Lô to Cherbourg-en-Cotentin	183 km (114 mi)	Flat stage	Peter Sagan (SVK)
3	4 July	Granville to Angers	223.5 km (139 mi)	Flat stage	Mark Cavendish (GBR)
4	5 July	Saumur to Limoges	237.5 km (148 mi)	Flat stage	Marcel Kittel (GER)
5	6 July	Limoges to Le Lioran	216 km (134 mi)	Medium mountain stage	Greg Van Avermaet (BEL)
6	7 July	Arpajon-sur-Cère to Montauban	190.5 km (118 mi)	Flat stage	Mark Cavendish (GBR)
7	8 July	L'Isle-Jourdain to Lac de Payolle	162.5 km (101 mi)	Medium mountain stage	Steve Cummings (GBR)
8	9 July	Pau to Bagnères-de-Luchon	184 km (114 mi)	High mountain stage	Chris Froome (GBR)
9	10 July	Vielha Val d'Aran (Spain) to Andorra-Arcalis (Andorra)	184.5 km (115 mi)	High mountain stage	Tom Dumoulin (NED)
	11 July	Andorra		Rest day	
10	12 July	Escaldes-Engordany (Andorra) to Revel	197 km (122 mi)	Medium mountain stage	Michael Matthews (AUS)
11	13 July	Carcassonne to Montpellier	162.5 km (101 mi)	Flat stage	Peter Sagan (SVK)
12	14 July	Montpellier to Chalet Reynard (Mont Ventoux)	178 km (111 mi)	High mountain stage	Thomas De Gendt (BEL)
13	15 July	Bourg-Saint-Andéol to La Caverne du Pont-d'Arc	37.5 km (23 mi)	Individual time trial	Tom Dumoulin (NED)
14	16 July	Montélimar to Villars-les-Dombes (Parc des Oiseaux)	208.5 km (130 mi)	Flat stage	Mark Cavendish (GBR)
15	17 July	Bourg-en-Bresse to Culoz	160 km (99 mi)	High mountain stage	Jarlinson Pantano (COL)
16	18 July	Moirans-en-Montagne to Bern (Switzerland)	209 km (130 mi)	Flat stage	Peter Sagan (SVK)
	19 July	Bern (Switzerland)		Rest day	
17	20 July	Bern (Switzerland) to Finhaut–Émosson (Switzerland)	184.5 km (115 mi)	High mountain stage	Ilnur Zakarin (RUS)
18	21 July	Sallanches to Megève	17 km (11 mi)	Mountain time trial	Chris Froome (GBR)
19	22 July	Albertville to Saint Gervais-les-Bains	146 km (91 mi)	High mountain stage	Romain Bardet (FRA)
20	23 July	Megève to Morzine	146.5 km (91 mi)	High mountain stage	Ion Izagirre (ESP)
21	24 July	Chantilly to Paris (Champs-Élysées)	113 km (70 mi)	Flat stage	André Greipel (GER)
	Total		3,529 km (2,193 mi)		

== Race overview ==
=== Grand Départ and journey south ===
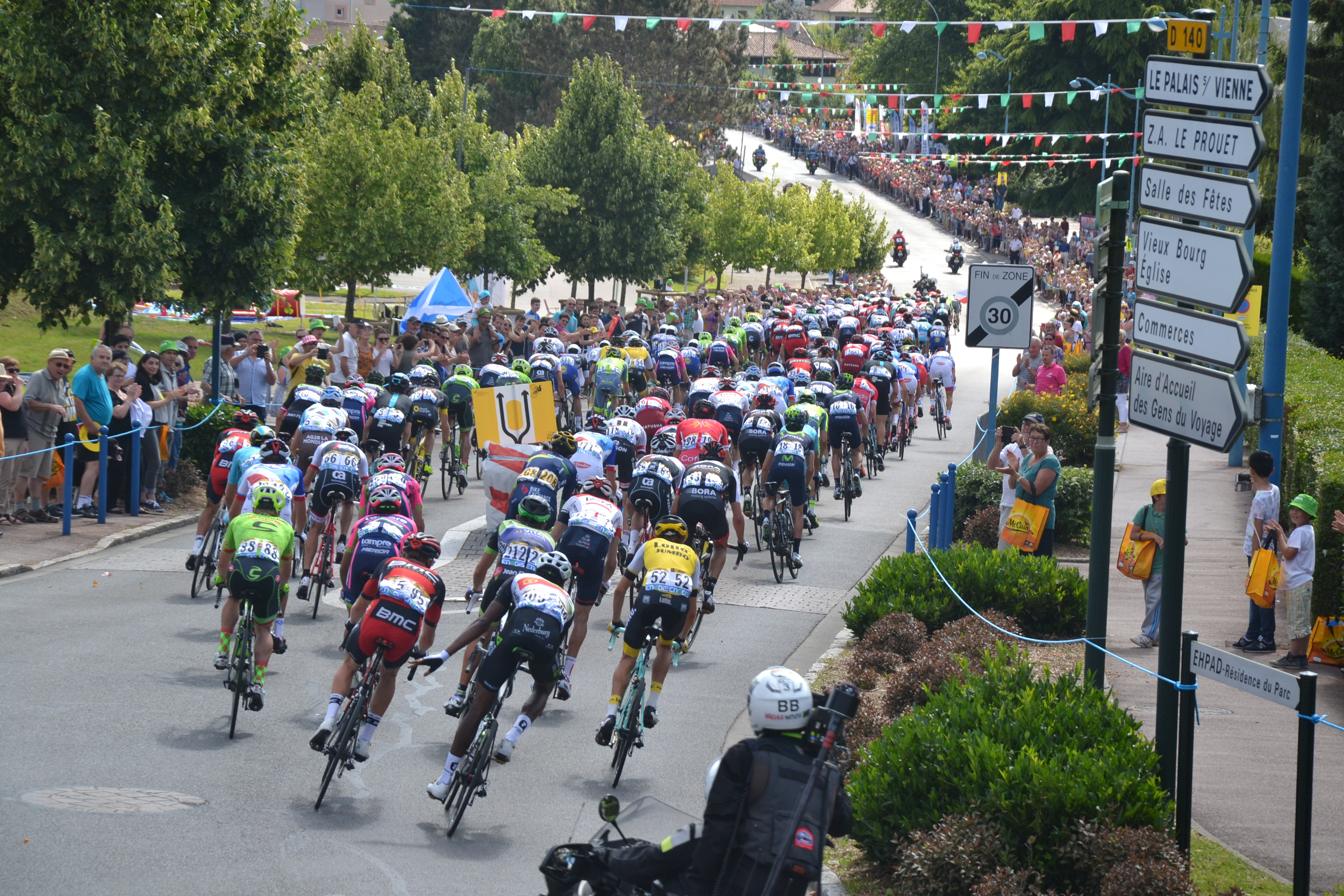
The peloton passing through the town of Panazol on the fourth stage, which ended with a bunch sprint won by Marcel Kittel of Etixx–Quick-Step

The first stage's bunch sprint finish was won by Mark Cavendish, who gained the race leader's yellow jersey; he also claimed the green jersey as the leader of the points classification, with Paul Voss (Bora–Argon 18) taking the polka dot jersey as the leader of the mountains classification. Alberto Contador crashed and lost 55 seconds. Peter Sagan took victory in stage two with an uphill sprint in Cherbourg, putting him in the yellow and green jerseys. Jasper Stuyven of Trek–Segafredo led the mountains classification. General classification rivals Contador and Richie Porte both lost time. The bunch sprint in Angers was won by Cavendish in a photo finish with André Greipel. Cavendish's win was his 28th in the Tour and drew him level with Bernard Hinault at second on the all-time list; Cavendish also took the green jersey. Another photo finish followed in the next stage with Marcel Kittel beating Direct Énergie's Bryan Coquard. Sagan claimed back the green and Thomas De Gendt (Lotto–Soudal) the polka dot. Greg Van Avermaet of BMC Racing Team won the fifth stage after he was the only rider to survive from an early breakaway. He took the lead of the general classification by over five minutes. Stage six was won by Cavendish, who beat Kittel and claimed the green jersey.

=== Pyrenees and transition ===
In stage seven, the first in the Pyrenees, Steve Cummings (Team Dimension Data) soloed over the final climb, the Col d'Aspin, and descended into the finish at Lac de Payolle where he took victory. Van Avermaet came fifth and extended his lead. Orica–BikeExchange's Adam Yates attacked the chasing group and as he passed underneath the one kilometre to go arch it collapsed on top of, and injured, him. In the following stage Chris Froome attacked the front of the race of overall favourites as they passed the summit of the Col de Peyresourde, descending to the finish in Bagnères-de-Luchon to take a solo victory by thirteen seconds. This put him in the yellow jersey, sixteen seconds ahead of Yates in second, with Rafał Majka (Tinkoff) taking the polka dot. In the Tour's queen stage, the ninth, Tom Dumoulin of Team Giant–Alpecin broke clear of the large breakaway to claim the win at the Andorra-Arcalis. Thibaut Pinot took the lead of the mountains classification. Contador abandoned the race, citing a fever which had developed overnight. The next day was the first rest day of the Tour. Another breakaway succeeded in stage ten, with Orica–BikeExchange using their advantage of having three riders in the small group to give Michael Matthews the win. Sagan, who came second, took the lead in the points classification.

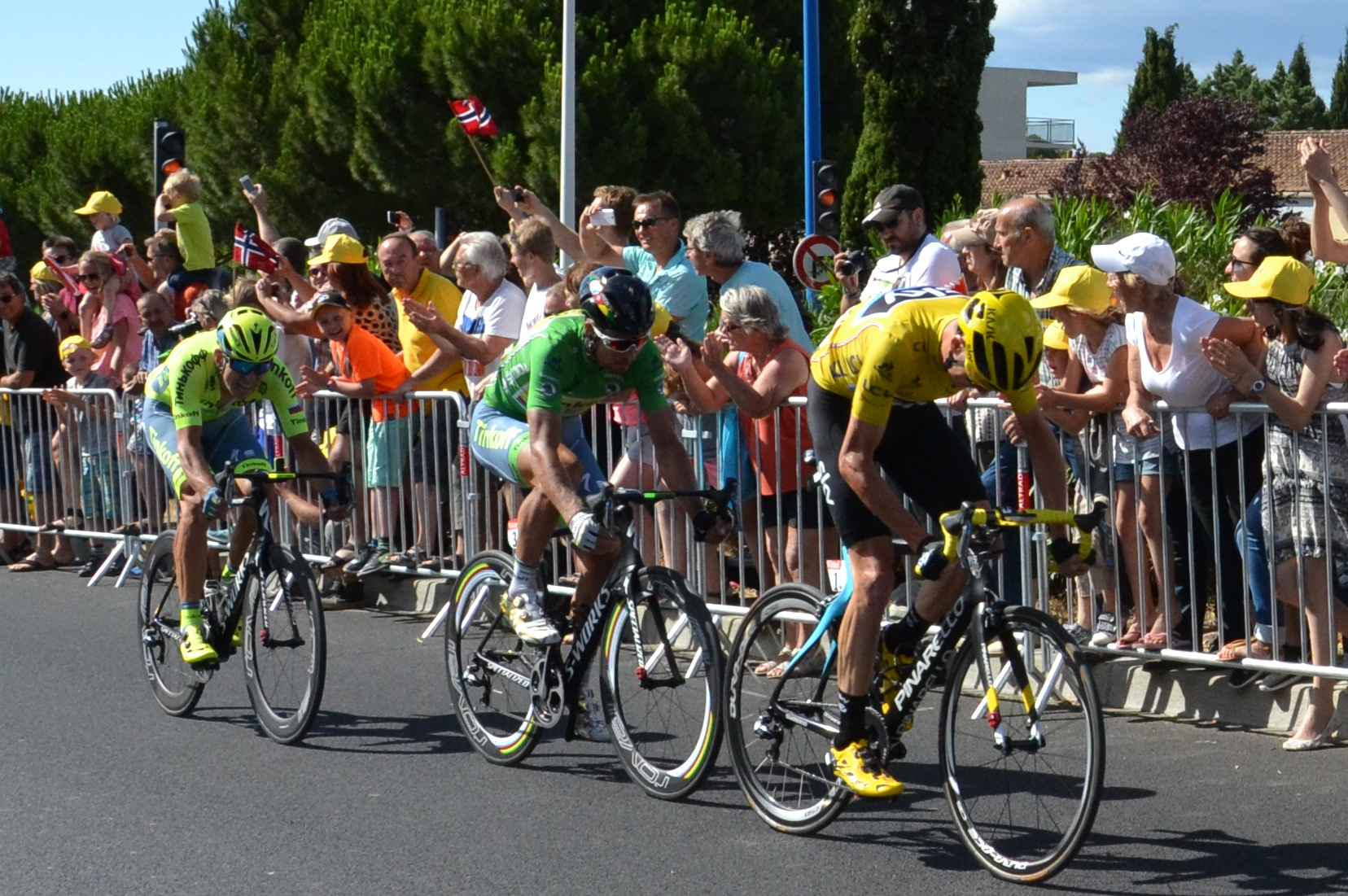
Chris Froome (yellow jersey) and Peter Sagan (green jersey), along with one teammate each, formed a breakaway in the final kilometers of stage eleven, with Sagan victorious and Froome gaining time on his rivals.

On stage eleven, Sagan forced a move in the final 12 km (7.5 mi) with his teammate Maciej Bodnar, who were followed by Froome and his teammate Geraint Thomas. They opened up a lead of over twenty seconds and held it to six seconds at the finish, where Sagan beat Froome in a sprint. A successful breakaway saw De Gendt win stage twelve at the finish at Chalet Reynard, which was changed from the intended summit finish at Mont Ventoux, 6 km (3.7 mi) later, due to dangerous winds. In the chasing group of overall favourites, a leading group of Porte, Froome and Bauke Mollema (Trek–Segafredo) crashed into the back of a camera motorbike that was stopped by the encroaching spectators. Froome's bike was unrideable and he was forced to run until he was given a bike from a neutral service car; although it did not fit him he managed to ride until he received his team bike. The race jury gave Froome and Porte the same time as Mollema, who later criticised the jury's decision, suggesting that they would have acted differently if he was the one to go down. De Gendt took the lead of the mountains classification. Stage thirteen's 37.5 km (23.3 mi) individual time trial was won by Dumoulin, 1:03 ahead of Froome, who extended his lead over his nearest rival (Mollema) to one minute and forty-seven seconds. Cavendish won his fourth stage the next day with a bunch sprint at the Parc des Oiseaux.

=== Alps and finale ===
IAM Cycling rider Jarlinson Pantano won stage fifteen after a sprint with fellow surviving breakaway rider Majka. In next stage, Sagan won his third stage from a select group of sprinters that had traversed a cobbled climb 6 km (3.7 mi) from the finish in Bern. The next day was the second rest day. In stage seventeen, as the race entered the Alps, Team Katusha's Ilnur Zakarin attacked a breakaway and held off a chasing Pantano to take the win at the summit finish by the Émosson Dam. In the following stage's 17 km (10.6 mi) mountain time trial Froome beat second-placed Dumoulin by 21 seconds and extended his lead to three minutes and 52 seconds overall, with Mollema keeping second. In stage nineteen, the general classification leaders descended the wet roads of the unclassified penultimate climb at the head of the race, with only Costa surviving from the breakaway. Romain Bardet attacked after a series of crashes that included Froome and Mollema. Froome took Thomas's bike and got back to the group, but Mollema was left isolated and finished over four minutes behind the stage winner Bardet, who had passed Costa in the final 7 km (4.3 mi) and soloed to the finish at the Le Bettex ski station. Froome's lead was increased to 4' 11", with Bardet moving up from fifth to second. In stage twenty Jon Izaguirre (Movistar Team) took the win in Morzine, attacking on the wet descent from a three rider group that led over the final climb of Col de Joux Plane.

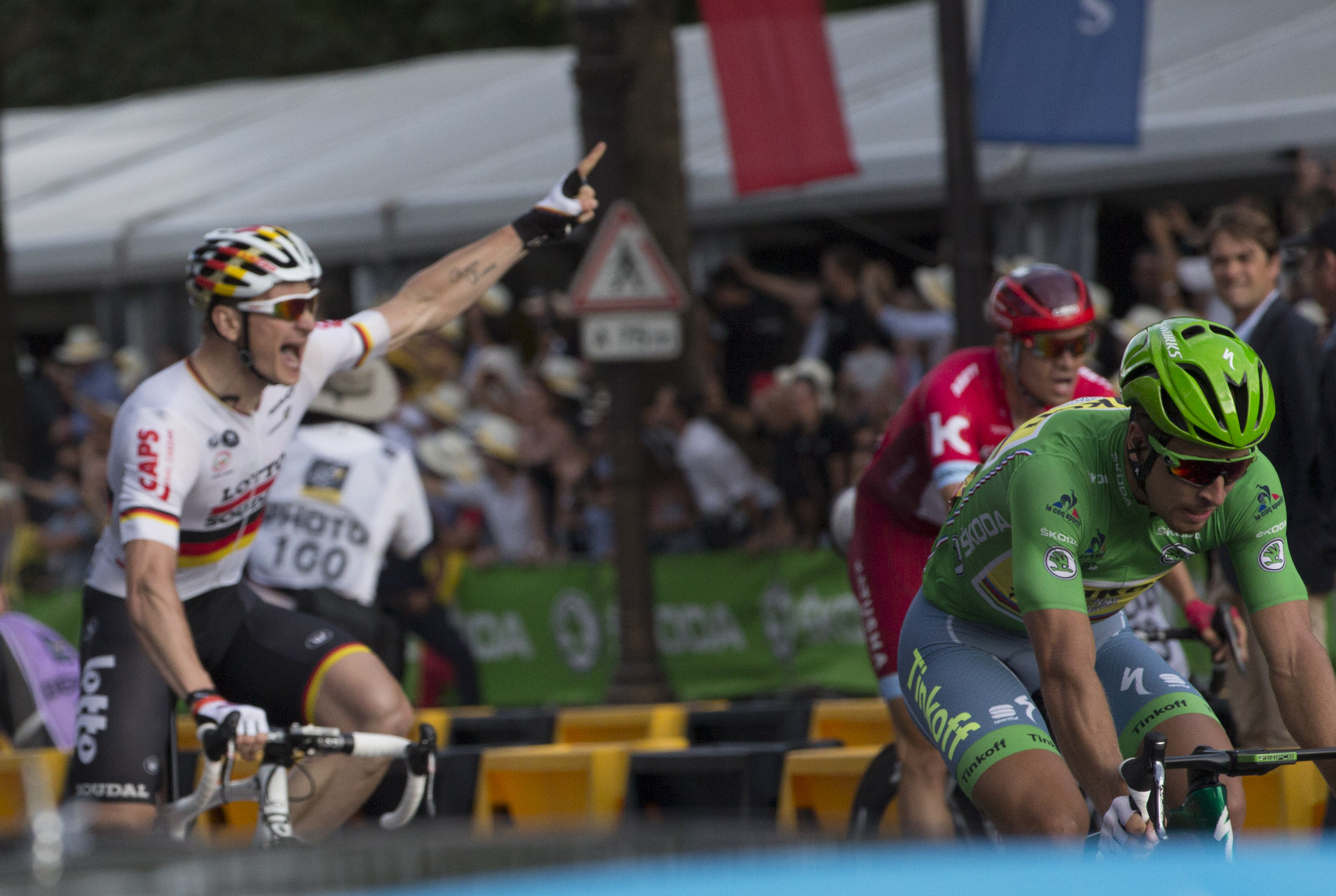
Lotto–Soudal's André Greipel (left) celebrates winning the Tour's final stage on the Champs-Élysées in Paris

The final stage in Paris was won by Greipel, his second consecutive Champs-Élysées stage win. Froome finished the race to claim his third Tour de France, becoming the first man since Miguel Induráin in 1995 Tour to officially defend his title. He beat second-placed Bardet by four minutes and five seconds, with Nairo Quintana third, a further sixteen seconds down. Sagan won the points classification with a total of 470, 242 ahead of Greipel in second. Majka won the mountains classification with De Gendt and Pantano second and third respectively. The best young rider was Yates, two minutes and sixteen seconds ahead of second-placed Louis Meintjes (Lampre–Merida). Movistar Team finished as the winners of the team classification, over eight minutes ahead of second-placed Team Sky. Of the 198 starters, 174 reached the finish of the last stage in Paris, beating the previous record high of 170 set in the 2010 Tour.

== Classification leadership and minor prizes ==
There were four main individual classifications contested in the 2016 Tour de France, as well as a team competition. The most important was the general classification, which was calculated by adding each rider's finishing times on each stage. Time bonuses (time subtracted) were awarded at the end of every stage apart from the two individual time trials. The first three riders got 10, 6 and 4 seconds, respectively. If a crash had happened within the final 3 km (1.9 mi) of a stage, not including time trials and summit finishes, the riders involved would have received the same time as the group they were in when the crash occurred. The rider with the lowest cumulative time was the winner of the general classification and was considered the overall winner of the Tour. The rider leading the classification wore a yellow jersey.

Points classification points for the top 15 positions by type
Type	1	2	3	4	5	6	7	8	9	10	11	12	13	14	15
Flat stage	50	30	20	18	16	14	12	10	8	7	6	5	4	3	2
Medium mountain stage	30	25	22	19	17	15	13	11	9	7	6	5	4	3	2
High mountain stage	20	17	15	13	11	10	9	8	7	6	5	4	3	2	1
Individual time trial	20	17	15	13	11	10	9	8	7	6	5	4	3	2	1
Intermediate sprint	20	17	15	13	11	10	9	8	7	6	5	4	3	2	1

The second classification was the points classification. Riders received points for finishing among the highest placed in a stage finish, or in intermediate sprints during the stage. The points available for each stage finish were determined by the stage's type. The leader was identified by a green jersey.

The third classification was the mountains classification. Points were awarded to the riders that reached the summit of the most difficult climbs first. The climbs were categorised as fourth-, third-, second- or first-category and hors catégorie, with the more difficult climbs rated lower. Double points were awarded on the summit finishes on stages 9, 12, 17 and 19. The leader wore a white jersey with red polka dots.

The final individual classification was the young rider classification. This was calculated the same way as the general classification, but the classification was restricted to riders who were born on or after 1 January 1991. The leader wore a white jersey.

The final classification was a team classification. This was calculated using the finishing times of the best three riders per team on each stage; the leading team was the team with the lowest cumulative time. The number of stage victories and placings per team determined the outcome of a tie. The riders in the team that lead this classification were identified with yellow number bibs on the back of their jerseys and yellow helmets.

In addition, there was a combativity award given after each stage to the rider considered, by a jury, to have "made the greatest effort and who demonstrated the best qualities of sportsmanship". No combativity awards were given for the time trials and the final stage. The winner wore a red number bib the following stage. At the conclusion of the Tour, Peter Sagan won the overall super-combativity award, again, decided by a jury.

A total of €2,295,850 was awarded in cash prizes in the race. The overall winner of the general classification received €500,000, with the second and third placed riders getting €200,000 and €100,000 respectively. All finishers of the race were awarded with money. The holders of the classifications benefited on each stage they led; the final winners of the points and mountains were given €25,000, while the best young rider and most combative rider got €20,000. The team classification winners were given €50,000. €11,000 was given to the winners of each stage of the race, with smaller amounts given to places 2–20. There were also three special awards each with a prize of €5000. The Souvenir Jacques Goddet, given to the first rider to pass Goddet's memorial at the summit of the Col du Tourmalet on stage eight, the Souvenir Henri Desgrange, given to first rider to pass the summit of the highest climb in the Tour, the Port d'Envalira on stage ten, and the Prix Bernard Hinault, given to the rider with fastest ascent of the Côte de Domancy on stage eighteen. Thibaut Pinot won the Jacques Goddet, Rui Costa won the Henri Desgrange and Richie Porte won the Bernard Hinault.

Classification leadership by stage
Stage	Winner	General classification	Points classification	Mountains classification	Young rider classification	Team classification	Combativity award
1	Mark Cavendish	Mark Cavendish	Mark Cavendish	Paul Voss	Edward Theuns	Lotto–Soudal	Anthony Delaplace
2	Peter Sagan	Peter Sagan	Peter Sagan	Jasper Stuyven	Julian Alaphilippe	Orica–BikeExchange	Jasper Stuyven
3	Mark Cavendish	Peter Sagan	Mark Cavendish	Jasper Stuyven	Julian Alaphilippe	Orica–BikeExchange	Thomas Voeckler
4	Marcel Kittel	Peter Sagan	Peter Sagan	Jasper Stuyven	Julian Alaphilippe	Orica–BikeExchange	Oliver Naesen
5	Greg Van Avermaet	Greg Van Avermaet	Peter Sagan	Thomas De Gendt	Julian Alaphilippe	BMC Racing Team	Thomas De Gendt
6	Mark Cavendish	Greg Van Avermaet	Mark Cavendish	Thomas De Gendt	Julian Alaphilippe	BMC Racing Team	Yukiya Arashiro
7	Steve Cummings	Greg Van Avermaet	Mark Cavendish	Thomas De Gendt	Adam Yates	BMC Racing Team	Vincenzo Nibali
8	Chris Froome	Chris Froome	Mark Cavendish	Rafał Majka	Adam Yates	BMC Racing Team	Thibaut Pinot
9	Tom Dumoulin	Chris Froome	Mark Cavendish	Thibaut Pinot	Adam Yates	Movistar Team	Tom Dumoulin
10	Michael Matthews	Chris Froome	Peter Sagan	Thibaut Pinot	Adam Yates	BMC Racing Team	Peter Sagan
11	Peter Sagan	Chris Froome	Peter Sagan	Thibaut Pinot	Adam Yates	BMC Racing Team	Arthur Vichot
12	Thomas De Gendt	Chris Froome	Peter Sagan	Thomas De Gendt	Adam Yates	BMC Racing Team	Thomas De Gendt
13	Tom Dumoulin	Chris Froome	Peter Sagan	Thomas De Gendt	Adam Yates	BMC Racing Team	no award
14	Mark Cavendish	Chris Froome	Peter Sagan	Thomas De Gendt	Adam Yates	BMC Racing Team	Jérémy Roy
15	Jarlinson Pantano	Chris Froome	Peter Sagan	Rafał Majka	Adam Yates	Movistar Team	Rafał Majka
16	Peter Sagan	Chris Froome	Peter Sagan	Rafał Majka	Adam Yates	Movistar Team	Alaphilippe and T. Martin
17	Ilnur Zakarin	Chris Froome	Peter Sagan	Rafał Majka	Adam Yates	Movistar Team	Jarlinson Pantano
18	Chris Froome	Chris Froome	Peter Sagan	Rafał Majka	Adam Yates	Movistar Team	no award
19	Romain Bardet	Chris Froome	Peter Sagan	Rafał Majka	Adam Yates	Movistar Team	Rui Costa
20	Jon Izagirre	Chris Froome	Peter Sagan	Rafał Majka	Adam Yates	Movistar Team	Jarlinson Pantano
21	André Greipel	Chris Froome	Peter Sagan	Rafał Majka	Adam Yates	Movistar Team	no award
Final		Chris Froome	Peter Sagan	Rafał Majka	Adam Yates	Movistar Team	Peter Sagan

- In stage two, Marcel Kittel, who was second in the points classification, wore the green jersey, because first placed Mark Cavendish wore the yellow jersey as leader of the general classification.
- In stages three and five, Mark Cavendish, who was second in the points classification, wore the green jersey, because first placed Peter Sagan wore the yellow jersey as leader of the general classification.

== Final standings ==
Legend
A yellow jersey.	Denotes the winner of the general classification	A white jersey with red polka dots.	Denotes the winner of the mountains classification
A green jersey.	Denotes the winner of the points classification	A white jersey.	Denotes the winner of the young rider classification
A white jersey with a yellow number bib.	Denotes the winner of the team classification	A white jersey with a red number bib.	Denotes the winner of the combativity award

=== General classification ===
Final general classification (1–10)
Rank	Rider	Team	Time
1	Chris Froome (GBR)	Team Sky	89h 04' 48"
2	Romain Bardet (FRA)	AG2R La Mondiale	+ 4' 05"
3	Nairo Quintana (COL)	Movistar Team	+ 4' 21"
4	Adam Yates (GBR)	Orica–BikeExchange	+ 4' 42"
5	Richie Porte (AUS)	BMC Racing Team	+ 5' 17"
6	Alejandro Valverde (ESP)	Movistar Team	+ 6' 16"
7	Joaquim Rodríguez (ESP)	Team Katusha	+ 6' 58"
8	Louis Meintjes (RSA)	Lampre–Merida	+ 6' 58"
9	Dan Martin (IRL)	Etixx–Quick-Step	+ 7' 04"
10	Roman Kreuziger (CZE)	Tinkoff	+ 7' 11"

Final general classification (11–174)
Rank	Rider	Team	Time
11	Bauke Mollema (NED)	Trek–Segafredo	+ 13' 13"
12	Sergio Henao (COL)	Team Sky	+ 18' 51"
13	Fabio Aru (ITA)	Astana	+ 19' 20"
14	Sébastien Reichenbach (SUI)	FDJ	+ 24' 59"
15	Geraint Thomas (GBR)	Team Sky	+ 28' 31"
16	Pierre Rolland (FRA)	Cannondale–Drapac	+ 30' 42"
17	Mikel Nieve (ESP)	Team Sky	+ 38' 30"
18	Stef Clement (NED)	IAM Cycling	+ 38' 57"
19	Jarlinson Pantano (COL)	IAM Cycling	+ 38' 59"
20	Alexis Vuillermoz (FRA)	AG2R La Mondiale	+ 42' 28"
21	Emanuel Buchmann (GER)	Bora–Argon 18	+ 47' 40"
22	Damiano Caruso (ITA)	BMC Racing Team	+ 48' 23"
23	Warren Barguil (FRA)	Team Giant–Alpecin	+ 52' 14"
24	Haimar Zubeldia (ESP)	Trek–Segafredo	+ 53' 06"
25	Ilnur Zakarin (RUS)	Team Katusha	+ 56' 33"
26	Tanel Kangert (EST)	Astana	+ 1h 03' 59"
27	Rafał Majka (POL)	Tinkoff	+ 1h 04' 25"
28	Wout Poels (NED)	Team Sky	+ 1h 06' 57"
29	Tejay van Garderen (USA)	BMC Racing Team	+ 1h 12' 06"
30	Vincenzo Nibali (ITA)	Astana	+ 1h 19' 59"
31	Daniel Moreno (ESP)	Movistar Team	+ 1h 21' 00"
32	Wilco Kelderman (NED)	LottoNL–Jumbo	+ 1h 24' 38"
33	Domenico Pozzovivo (ITA)	AG2R La Mondiale	+ 1h 25' 14"
34	Fränk Schleck (LUX)	Trek–Segafredo	+ 1h 27' 39"
35	Mikel Landa (ESP)	Team Sky	+ 1h 32' 19"
36	Steve Morabito (SUI)	FDJ	+ 1h 38' 30"
37	Diego Rosa (ITA)	Astana	+ 1h 46' 36"
38	Daryl Impey (RSA)	Orica–BikeExchange	+ 1h 50' 51"
39	Bartosz Huzarski (POL)	Bora–Argon 18	+ 1h 55' 28"
40	Thomas De Gendt (BEL)	Lotto–Soudal	+ 1h 58' 45"
41	Julian Alaphilippe (FRA)	Etixx–Quick-Step	+ 2h 00' 09"
42	Serge Pauwels (BEL)	Team Dimension Data	+ 2h 00' 38"
43	Sylvain Chavanel (FRA)	Direct Énergie	+ 2h 02' 53"
44	Greg Van Avermaet (BEL)	BMC Racing Team	+ 2h 06' 13"
45	Amaël Moinard (FRA)	BMC Racing Team	+ 2h 06' 36"
46	Peter Stetina (USA)	Trek–Segafredo	+ 2h 07' 22"
47	Ion Izagirre (ESP)	Movistar Team	+ 2h 09' 49"
48	Luis León Sánchez (ESP)	Astana	+ 2h 10' 25"
49	Rui Costa (POR)	Lampre–Merida	+ 2h 11' 42"
50	Jan Bakelants (BEL)	AG2R La Mondiale	+ 2h 13' 47"
51	Kristijan Đurasek (CRO)	Lampre–Merida	+ 2h 15' 16"
52	Jakob Fuglsang (DEN)	Astana	+ 2h 17' 16"
53	George Bennett (NZL)	LottoNL–Jumbo	+ 2h 18' 05"
54	Jan Polanc (SLO)	Lampre–Merida	+ 2h 18' 24"
55	Luis Ángel Maté (ESP)	Cofidis	+ 2h 21' 17"
56	Georg Preidler (AUT)	Team Giant–Alpecin	+ 2h 25' 45"
57	Mikaël Cherel (FRA)	AG2R La Mondiale	+ 2h 27' 45"
58	Robert Kišerlovski (CRO)	Tinkoff	+ 2h 28' 06"
59	Eduardo Sepúlveda (ARG)	Fortuneo–Vital Concept	+ 2h 28' 27"
60	Fabrice Jeandesboz (FRA)	Direct Énergie	+ 2h 39' 17"
61	Ben Gastauer (LUX)	AG2R La Mondiale	+ 2h 41' 05"
62	Alexey Lutsenko (KAZ)	Astana	+ 2h 41' 52"
63	Anthony Roux (FRA)	FDJ	+ 2h 43' 51"
64	Martin Elmiger (SUI)	IAM Cycling	+ 2h 44' 01"
65	Patrick Konrad (AUT)	Bora–Argon 18	+ 2h 46' 32"
66	Simon Geschke (GER)	Team Giant–Alpecin	+ 2h 47' 32"
67	Alberto Losada (ESP)	Team Katusha	+ 2h 48' 02"
68	Cyril Gautier (FRA)	AG2R La Mondiale	+ 2h 49' 49"
69	Winner Anacona (COL)	Movistar Team	+ 2h 50' 23"
70	Brice Feillu (FRA)	Fortuneo–Vital Concept	+ 2h 50' 49"
71	Tony Gallopin (FRA)	Lotto–Soudal	+ 2h 51' 23"
72	Rubén Plaza (ESP)	Orica–BikeExchange	+ 2h 53' 10"
73	Laurens ten Dam (NED)	Team Giant–Alpecin	+ 2h 53' 22"
74	Paolo Tiralongo (ITA)	Astana	+ 2h 58' 12"
75	Jérôme Coppel (FRA)	IAM Cycling	+ 2h 58' 48"
76	Michael Schär (SUI)	BMC Racing Team	+ 3h 00' 54"
77	Michael Valgren (DEN)	Tinkoff	+ 3h 01' 22"
78	Arthur Vichot (FRA)	FDJ	+ 3h 02' 10"
79	Thomas Voeckler (FRA)	Direct Énergie	+ 3h 02' 35"
80	Nelson Oliveira (POR)	Movistar Team	+ 3h 04' 53"
81	Romain Sicard (FRA)	Direct Énergie	+ 3h 09' 11"
82	Tom-Jelte Slagter (NED)	Cannondale–Drapac	+ 3h 09' 19"
83	Oliver Naesen (BEL)	IAM Cycling	+ 3h 11' 28"
84	Chris Anker Sørensen (DEN)	Fortuneo–Vital Concept	+ 3h 12' 52"
85	Daniel Teklehaimanot (ERI)	Team Dimension Data	+ 3h 14' 07"
86	Andriy Hrivko (UKR)	Astana	+ 3h 14' 31"
87	Arnold Jeannesson (FRA)	Cofidis	+ 3h 18' 14"
88	Jan Bárta (CZE)	Bora–Argon 18	+ 3h 19' 44"
89	Marcus Burghardt (GER)	BMC Racing Team	+ 3h 20' 22"
90	Anthony Delaplace (FRA)	Fortuneo–Vital Concept	+ 3h 21' 09"
91	Dylan van Baarle (NED)	Cannondale–Drapac	+ 3h 23' 15"
92	Tsgabu Grmay (ETH)	Lampre–Merida	+ 3h 23' 17"
93	Pierre-Luc Périchon (FRA)	Fortuneo–Vital Concept	+ 3h 24' 36"
94	Bert-Jan Lindeman (NED)	LottoNL–Jumbo	+ 3h 26' 19"
95	Peter Sagan (SVK)	Tinkoff	+ 3h 27' 09"
96	Jérémy Roy (FRA)	FDJ	+ 3h 27' 15"
97	Reto Hollenstein (SUI)	IAM Cycling	+ 3h 28' 33"
98	Paul Martens (GER)	LottoNL–Jumbo	+ 3h 33' 29"
99	Jasper Stuyven (BEL)	Trek–Segafredo	+ 3h 33' 29"
100	Adam Hansen (AUS)	Lotto–Soudal	+ 3h 34' 26"
101	Paul Voss (GER)	Bora–Argon 18	+ 3h 36' 25"
102	Luka Pibernik (SLO)	Lampre–Merida	+ 3h 38' 17"
103	Vasil Kiryienka (BLR)	Team Sky	+ 3h 38' 41"
104	Sep Vanmarcke (BEL)	LottoNL–Jumbo	+ 3h 40' 02"
105	Florian Vachon (FRA)	Fortuneo–Vital Concept	+ 3h 40' 09"
106	Nicolas Edet (FRA)	Cofidis	+ 3h 42' 42"
107	Antoine Duchesne (CAN)	Direct Énergie	+ 3h 44' 54"
108	Imanol Erviti (ESP)	Movistar Team	+ 3h 46' 42"
109	Edvald Boasson Hagen (NOR)	Team Dimension Data	+ 3h 47' 29"
110	Michael Matthews (AUS)	Orica–BikeExchange	+ 3h 47' 40"
111	Timo Roosen (NED)	LottoNL–Jumbo	+ 3h 50' 43"
112	Luke Durbridge (AUS)	Orica–BikeExchange	+ 3h 51' 55"
113	Bryan Coquard (FRA)	Direct Énergie	+ 3h 51' 57"
114	Julien Vermote (BEL)	Etixx–Quick-Step	+ 3h 52' 50"
115	Reinardt Janse van Rensburg (RSA)	Team Dimension Data	+ 3h 56' 30"
116	Yukiya Arashiro (JPN)	Lampre–Merida	+ 3h 57' 06"
117	Brent Bookwalter (USA)	BMC Racing Team	+ 3h 57' 49"
118	Petr Vakoč (CZE)	Etixx–Quick-Step	+ 3h 57' 58"
119	Christopher Juul-Jensen (DEN)	Orica–BikeExchange	+ 3h 58' 10"
120	Markel Irizar (ESP)	Trek–Segafredo	+ 3h 58' 17"
121	Jérôme Cousin (FRA)	Cofidis	+ 3h 58' 36"
122	Roy Curvers (NED)	Team Giant–Alpecin	+ 4h 03' 16"
123	Grégory Rast (SUI)	Trek–Segafredo	+ 4h 03' 44"
124	Lawson Craddock (USA)	Cannondale–Drapac	+ 4h 03' 44"
125	Natnael Berhane (ERI)	Team Dimension Data	+ 4h 04' 27"
126	Jürgen Roelandts (BEL)	Lotto–Soudal	+ 4h 05' 22"
127	William Bonnet (FRA)	FDJ	+ 4h 06' 18"
128	Cesare Benedetti (ITA)	Bora–Argon 18	+ 4h 06' 23"
129	Ángel Vicioso (ESP)	Team Katusha	+ 4h 08' 07"
130	Samuel Dumoulin (FRA)	AG2R La Mondiale	+ 4h 08' 08"
131	Alex Howes (USA)	Cannondale–Drapac	+ 4h 08' 22"
132	Michael Albasini (SUI)	Orica–BikeExchange	+ 4h 09' 04"
133	André Greipel (GER)	Lotto–Soudal	+ 4h 09' 07"
134	Ramūnas Navardauskas (LIT)	Cannondale–Drapac	+ 4h 09' 40"
135	Mathew Hayman (AUS)	Orica–BikeExchange	+ 4h 10' 33"
136	Matteo Bono (ITA)	Lampre–Merida	+ 4h 12' 53"
137	Cyril Lemoine (FRA)	Cofidis	+ 4h 13' 49"
138	Maarten Wynants (BEL)	LottoNL–Jumbo	+ 4h 16' 53"
139	Iljo Keisse (BEL)	Etixx–Quick-Step	+ 4h 16' 57"
140	Stephen Cummings (GBR)	Team Dimension Data	+ 4h 17' 03"
141	Sondre Holst Enger (NOR)	IAM Cycling	+ 4h 17' 32"
142	Geoffrey Soupe (FRA)	Cofidis	+ 4h 18' 15"
143	Ramon Sinkeldam (NED)	Team Giant–Alpecin	+ 4h 21' 41"
144	Maximiliano Richeze (ARG)	Etixx–Quick-Step	+ 4h 22' 02"
145	Matteo Tosatto (ITA)	Tinkoff	+ 4h 22' 05"
146	Armindo Fonseca (FRA)	Fortuneo–Vital Concept	+ 4h 23' 01"
147	Alexis Gougeard (FRA)	AG2R La Mondiale	+ 4h 23' 42"
148	John Degenkolb (GER)	Team Giant–Alpecin	+ 4h 24' 24"
149	Alexander Kristoff (NOR)	Team Katusha	+ 4h 24' 24"
150	Fabio Sabatini (ITA)	Etixx–Quick-Step	+ 4h 26' 39"
151	Luke Rowe (GBR)	Team Sky	+ 4h 27' 49"
152	Kristijan Koren (SLO)	Cannondale–Drapac	+ 4h 28' 01"
153	Albert Timmer (NED)	Team Giant–Alpecin	+ 4h 28' 11"
154	Andreas Schillinger (GER)	Bora–Argon 18	+ 4h 28' 33"
155	Greg Henderson (NZL)	Lotto–Soudal	+ 4h 29' 22"
156	Oscar Gatto (ITA)	Tinkoff	+ 4h 29' 38"
157	Christophe Laporte (FRA)	Cofidis	+ 4h 29' 47"
158	Yohann Gène (FRA)	Direct Énergie	+ 4h 30' 02"
159	Maciej Bodnar (POL)	Tinkoff	+ 4h 30' 30"
160	Dylan Groenewegen (NED)	LottoNL–Jumbo	+ 4h 30' 34"
161	Ian Stannard (GBR)	Team Sky	+ 4h 31' 34"
162	Marco Haller (AUT)	Team Katusha	+ 4h 31' 40"
163	Robert Wagner (GER)	LottoNL–Jumbo	+ 4h 32' 09"
164	Adrien Petit (FRA)	Direct Énergie	+ 4h 32' 25"
165	Jacopo Guarnieri (ITA)	Team Katusha	+ 4h 34' 45"
166	Marcel Kittel (GER)	Etixx–Quick-Step	+ 4h 35' 06"
167	Vegard Breen (NOR)	Fortuneo–Vital Concept	+ 4h 38' 27"
168	Davide Cimolai (ITA)	Lampre–Merida	+ 4h 39' 37"
169	Marcel Sieberg (GER)	Lotto–Soudal	+ 4h 40' 24"
170	Daniel McLay (GBR)	Fortuneo–Vital Concept	+ 4h 50' 14"
171	Bernhard Eisel (AUT)	Team Dimension Data	+ 4h 51' 07"
172	Leigh Howard (AUS)	IAM Cycling	+ 4h 55' 13"
173	Lars Bak (DEN)	Lotto–Soudal	+ 5h 01' 18"
174	Sam Bennett (IRL)	Bora–Argon 18	+ 5h 17' 14"

=== Points classification ===
Final points classification (1–10)
Rank	Rider	Team	Points
1	Peter Sagan (SVK)	Tinkoff	470
2	Marcel Kittel (GER)	Etixx–Quick-Step	228
3	Michael Matthews (AUS)	Orica–BikeExchange	199
4	André Greipel (GER)	Lotto–Soudal	178
5	Alexander Kristoff (NOR)	Team Katusha	172
6	Bryan Coquard (FRA)	Direct Énergie	156
7	Thomas de Gendt (BEL)	Lotto–Soudal	154
8	Greg van Avermaet (BEL)	BMC Racing Team	136
9	Chris Froome (GBR)	Team Sky	131
10	Rafał Majka (POL)	Tinkoff	120

=== Mountains classification ===
Final mountains classification (1–10)
Rank	Rider	Team	Points
1	Rafał Majka (POL)	Tinkoff	209
2	Thomas De Gendt (BEL)	Lotto–Soudal	130
3	Jarlinson Pantano (COL)	IAM Cycling	121
4	Ilnur Zakarin (RUS)	Team Katusha	84
5	Rui Costa (POR)	Lampre–Merida	76
6	Serge Pauwels (BEL)	Team Dimension Data	62
7	Stef Clement (NED)	IAM Cycling	53
8	Vincenzo Nibali (ITA)	Astana	36
9	Kristijan Đurasek (CRO)	Lampre–Merida	36
10	Thomas Voeckler (FRA)	Direct Énergie	33

=== Young rider classification ===
Final young rider classification (1–10)
Rank	Rider	Team	Time
1	Adam Yates (GBR)	Orica–BikeExchange	89h 09' 30"
2	Louis Meintjes (RSA)	Lampre–Merida	+ 2' 16"
3	Emanuel Buchmann (GER)	Bora–Argon 18	+ 42' 58"
4	Warren Barguil (FRA)	Team Giant–Alpecin	+ 47' 32"
5	Wilco Kelderman (NED)	LottoNL–Jumbo	+ 1h 19' 56"
6	Julian Alaphilippe (FRA)	Etixx–Quick-Step	+ 1h 55' 27"
7	Jan Polanc (SLO)	Lampre–Merida	+ 2h 13' 42"
8	Eduardo Sepúlveda (ARG)	Fortuneo–Vital Concept	+ 2h 23' 45"
9	Alexey Lutsenko (KAZ)	Astana	+ 2h 37' 10"
10	Patrick Konrad (AUT)	Bora–Argon 18	+ 2h 41' 50"

=== Team classification ===
Final team classification (1–10)
Rank	Team	Time
1	(Spain) Movistar Team	267h 20' 45"
2	(United Kingdom) Team Sky	+ 8' 14"
3	(United States) BMC Racing Team	+ 48' 11"
4	(France) AG2R La Mondiale	+ 56' 50"
5	(Kazakhstan) Astana	+ 1h 16' 58"
6	Tinkoff	+ 1h 52' 23"
7	(United States) Trek–Segafredo	+ 2h 00' 16"
8	(Switzerland) IAM Cycling	+ 2h 10' 03"
9	Team Katusha	+ 2h 29' 13"
10	(Italy) Lampre–Merida	+ 2h 35' 18"

== UCI rankings ==
Riders from the WorldTeams competing individually, as well as for their teams and nations, for points that contributed towards the World Tour rankings. Riders from both the WorldTeams and Professional Continental teams also competed individually and for their nations for points that contributed towards the new UCI World Ranking, which included all UCI road races. Points were awarded to the top twenty (World Tour) and sixty finishers (World Ranking) in the general classification and to the top five finishers in each stage. The points accrued by Chris Froome moved him up to third in the World Tour and second in the World Ranking. Peter Sagan held the lead of both rankings. Movistar Team's strong showing put them in the lead of the World Tour team ranking, replacing Tinkoff. Spain and France remained the leaders of the WorldTour and World Ranking nation rankings, respectively.

UCI World Tour individual ranking on 24 July 2016 (1–10)
Rank	Prev.	Name	Team	Points
1	1	Peter Sagan (SVK)	Tinkoff	445
2	4	Nairo Quintana (COL)	Movistar Team	407
3	21	Chris Froome (GBR)	Team Sky	396
4	3	Richie Porte (AUS)	BMC Racing Team	394
5	2	Alberto Contador (ESP)	Tinkoff	314
6	20	Romain Bardet (FRA)	AG2R La Mondiale	314
7	9	Alejandro Valverde (ESP)	Movistar Team	307
8	11	Dan Martin (IRL)	Etixx–Quick-Step	280
9	5	Vincenzo Nibali (ITA)	Astana	241
10	6	Ion Izagirre (ESP)	Movistar Team	240

UCI World Ranking individual ranking on 24 July 2016 (1–10)
Rank	Prev.	Name	Team	Points
1	1	Peter Sagan (SVK)	Tinkoff	3233
2	30	Chris Froome (GBR)	Team Sky	2569
3	2	Alejandro Valverde (ESP)	Movistar Team	2269
4	4	Nairo Quintana (COL)	Movistar Team	2250.25
5	18	Romain Bardet (FRA)	AG2R La Mondiale	2017
6	11	Richie Porte (AUS)	BMC Racing Team	1863
7	3	Alberto Contador (ESP)	Tinkoff	1652
8	10	Greg Van Avermaet (BEL)	BMC Racing Team	1628
9	7	Ion Izagirre (ESP)	Movistar Team	1626
10	9	Alexander Kristoff (NOR)	Team Katusha	1564

== See also ==
- 2016 in men's road cycling
- 2016 in sports
- 2016 La Course by Le Tour de France

== Bibliography ==
- Race regulations (PDF). Paris: Amaury Sport Organisation. 2016. Archived (PDF) from the original on 2 July 2016.
- UCI cycling regulations (PDF). Part 2, road races. Aigle, Switzerland: Union Cycliste Internationale. 1 January 2016. Archived from the original (PDF) on 22 January 2016.
