= 2016 Tour de France, Stage 12 to Stage 21 =

Cycling road race

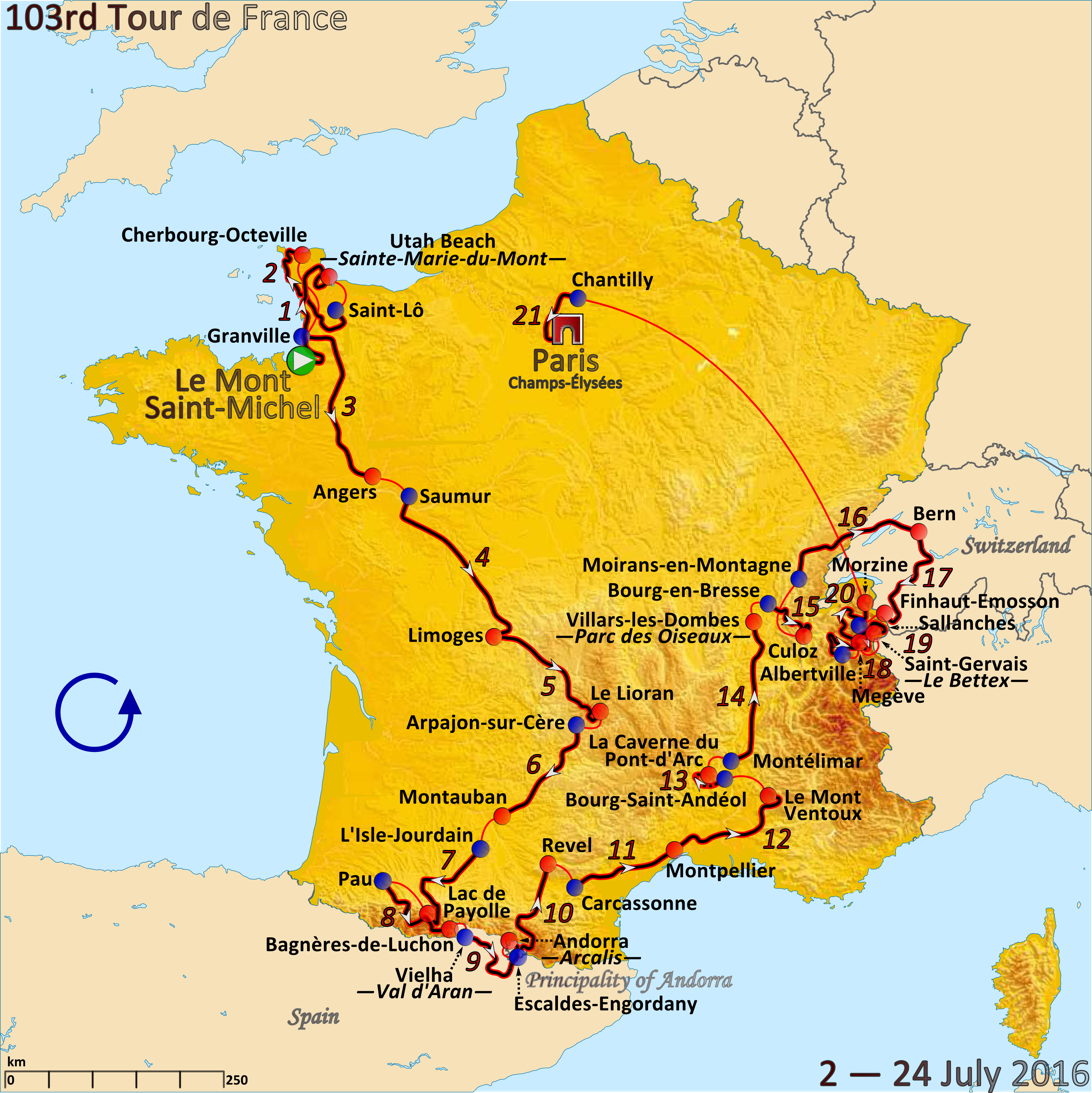
Route of the 2016 Tour de France

The 2016 Tour de France was the 103rd edition of the cycle race, one of cycling's Grand Tours. On 24 November 2014, Amaury Sport Organisation announced that the race will depart, on 2 July 2016, from the French department of Manche, for the first time in the history of the Tour de France. The race had a stage finish in Andorra. The race finished on the Champs-Élysées in Paris on 24 July.

== Classification standings ==
Legend
Yellow jersey	Denotes the leader of the general classification	Green jersey	Denotes the leader of the points classification
Polka dot jersey	Denotes the leader of the mountains classification	White jersey	Denotes the leader of the young rider classification
Jersey with a yellow background on the number bib.	Denotes the leader of the team classification		

== Stage 12 ==
14 July 2016 — Montpellier to Chalet Reynard (Mont Ventoux), 178 km (111 mi)

The queen stage of the 2016 Tour, on the French National Day of Bastille Day, this mountain stage departed west out of Montpellier before quickly turning north-east to head through Castries and Sommières. The route then zig-zagged east through Vergèze to Bouillargues. Continuing east, the riders travelled through Beaucaire, Tarascon and Saint-Rémy-de-Provence to an intermediate sprint at Mollégès. The race then headed north-east through Cavaillon and ascended through Gordes to the Category 4 Côte de Gordes at 449 metres (1,473 ft). Turning north, with a brief descent, the race continued climbing into the Category 3 Col des Trois Termes to 577 metres (1,893 ft). The route then descended to Mazan and turned east to Bédoin. The riders continued east to begin the ascent of the Hors catégorie Mont Ventoux, at an average gradient of 8.8%, using the southern route to the summit. The finish line was to have been reached at an altitude of 1,912 metres (6,273 ft) after a 15.7 kilometres (9.8 mi) ascent. After a weather forecast of high winds at the summit of Ventoux, the stage was shortened by 6 km (3.7 mi) the day before. The stage finished at Chalet Reynard at 1,435 metres (4,708 ft), with approximately 10 kilometres (6.2 mi) of ascent up the mountain.

After the route was shortened, spectators congregated near the new finishing line. Near the end of the race, an attacking group consisting of Chris Froome, Richie Porte, and Bauke Mollema encountered thick crowds along the climb. The crowds forced a motorbike in front of the riders to suddenly stop, causing all three riders to crash. Mollema was able to get back on his bike and quickly ride off, but Porte and Froome were both delayed, especially Froome, whose bike was damaged in the crash. Leaving his bike behind, Froome then decided to run up Mont Ventoux, before being given a neutral service bike. Shortly thereafter he was able to get a team bike from his team car. Froome finished the stage 1 minute and 40 seconds behind Mollema, provisionally ceding the yellow jersey to Adam Yates and being placed in sixth. After the incident was reviewed, a jury granted both Froome and Porte the same time as Mollema, who had finished ahead of the main field despite the crash. This gave Froome the yellow jersey again, and also gave him time on both Yates and Nairo Quintana.

Stage 12 result

Rank	Rider	Team	Time
1	Thomas De Gendt (BEL)	Lotto–Soudal	4h 31' 51"
2	Serge Pauwels (BEL)	Team Dimension Data	+ 2"
3	Daniel Navarro (ESP)	Cofidis	+ 14"
4	Stef Clement (NED)	IAM Cycling	+ 40"
5	Sylvain Chavanel (FRA)	Direct Énergie	+ 40"
6	Bert-Jan Lindeman (NED)	LottoNL–Jumbo	+ 2' 52"
7	Daniel Teklehaimanot (ERI)	Team Dimension Data	+ 3' 13"
8	Sep Vanmarcke (BEL)	LottoNL–Jumbo	+ 3' 26"
9	Chris Anker Sørensen (DEN)	Fortuneo–Vital Concept	+ 4' 23"
10	Bauke Mollema (NED)	Trek–Segafredo	+ 5' 05"

General classification after stage 12

Rank	Rider	Team	Time
1	Chris Froome (GBR)	Team Sky	57h 11' 33"
2	Adam Yates (GBR)	Orica–BikeExchange	+ 47"
3	Nairo Quintana (COL)	Movistar Team	+ 54"
4	Bauke Mollema (NED)	Trek–Segafredo	+ 56"
5	Romain Bardet (FRA)	AG2R La Mondiale	+ 1' 15"
6	Alejandro Valverde (ESP)	Movistar Team	+ 1' 32"
7	Tejay van Garderen (USA)	BMC Racing Team	+ 1' 32"
8	Fabio Aru (ITA)	Astana	+ 1' 54"
9	Dan Martin (IRL)	Etixx–Quick-Step	+ 1' 56"
10	Joaquim Rodríguez (ESP)	Team Katusha	+ 2' 11"

== Stage 13 ==
15 July 2016 — Bourg-Saint-Andéol to La Caverne du Pont-d'Arc, 37.5 km (23 mi) individual time trial (ITT)

This short stage was an individual time trial on an undulating road, departing north-west and uphill from Bourg-Saint-Andéol. The first time check took place at the 7 kilometres (4.3 mi) mark at Côte de Bourg-Saint-Andéol. Each rider then headed east through Saint-Remèze, to the second time check at the 20 kilometres (12 mi) mark at Les Arredons. From there, the road took a winding descent to the third time check at the 28 kilometres (17 mi) mark at the Pont d'Arc, with the road then winding north through Vallon-Pont-d'Arc and then uphill east to the finish line at the Caverne du Pont-d'Arc. The route was expected to take each rider around 50 minutes.

The presentation of the jerseys was altered in the wake of the Nice attack. There was no music played, no presentation of sponsors, and all the jersey winners walked onto the stage together, in silence. Over the next three days, official days of mourning by order of the French government, the presentations were done without the usual podium music.

Stage 13 result

Rank	Rider	Team	Time
1	Tom Dumoulin (NED)	Team Giant–Alpecin	50' 15"
2	Chris Froome (GBR)	Team Sky	+ 1' 03"
3	Nelson Oliveira (POR)	Movistar Team	+ 1' 31"
4	Jérôme Coppel (FRA)	IAM Cycling	+ 1' 35"
5	Rohan Dennis (AUS)	BMC Racing Team	+ 1' 41"
6	Bauke Mollema (NED)	Trek–Segafredo	+ 1' 54"
7	Geraint Thomas (GBR)	Team Sky	+ 2' 00"
8	Jon Izagirre (ESP)	Movistar Team	+ 2' 02"
9	Tony Martin (GER)	Etixx–Quick-Step	+ 2' 05"
10	Steve Cummings (GBR)	Team Dimension Data	+ 2' 24"

General classification after stage 13

Rank	Rider	Team	Time
1	Chris Froome (GBR)	Team Sky	58h 02' 51"
2	Bauke Mollema (NED)	Trek–Segafredo	+ 1' 47"
3	Adam Yates (GBR)	Orica–BikeExchange	+ 2' 45"
4	Nairo Quintana (COL)	Movistar Team	+ 2' 59"
5	Alejandro Valverde (ESP)	Movistar Team	+ 3' 17"
6	Tejay van Garderen (USA)	BMC Racing Team	+ 3' 19"
7	Romain Bardet (FRA)	AG2R La Mondiale	+ 4' 04"
8	Richie Porte (AUS)	BMC Racing Team	+ 4' 27"
9	Dan Martin (IRL)	Etixx–Quick-Step	+ 5' 03"
10	Fabio Aru (ITA)	Astana	+ 5' 16"

== Stage 14 ==
16 July 2016 — Montélimar to Villars-les-Dombes Parc des Oiseaux, 208.5 km (130 mi)

This flat stage departed from Montélimar heading east through Cléon-d'Andran to the Category 4 climb of the Côte de Puy-Saint-Martin. The route then turned north through Crest, Bourg-de-Péage and Margès to the Category 4 climbs of Côte du Four-à-Chaux and the Côte d'Hauterives. The riders continued north through Beaurepaire and Eyzin-Pinet to an intermediate sprint at the Lafayette industrial park to the west of Diémoz. The race continued north around the eastern outskirt of Lyon, travelling through Saint-Quentin-Fallavier, Charvieu-Chavagneux, Jons and Montluel to the finish at the Parc des Oiseaux.

Stage 14 result

Rank	Rider	Team	Time
1	Mark Cavendish (GBR)	Team Dimension Data	5h 43' 49"
2	Alexander Kristoff (NOR)	Team Katusha	s.t.
3	Peter Sagan (SVK)	Tinkoff	s.t.
4	John Degenkolb (GER)	Team Giant–Alpecin	s.t.
5	Marcel Kittel (GER)	Etixx–Quick-Step	s.t.
6	André Greipel (GER)	Lotto–Soudal	s.t.
7	Bryan Coquard (FRA)	Direct Énergie	s.t.
8	Davide Cimolai (ITA)	Lampre–Merida	s.t.
9	Christophe Laporte (FRA)	Cofidis	s.t.
10	Samuel Dumoulin (FRA)	AG2R La Mondiale	s.t.

General classification after stage 14

Rank	Rider	Team	Time
1	Chris Froome (GBR)	Team Sky	63h 46' 40"
2	Bauke Mollema (NED)	Trek–Segafredo	+ 1' 47"
3	Adam Yates (GBR)	Orica–BikeExchange	+ 2' 45"
4	Nairo Quintana (COL)	Movistar Team	+ 2' 59"
5	Alejandro Valverde (ESP)	Movistar Team	+ 3' 17"
6	Tejay van Garderen (USA)	BMC Racing Team	+ 3' 19"
7	Romain Bardet (FRA)	AG2R La Mondiale	+ 4' 04"
8	Richie Porte (AUS)	BMC Racing Team	+ 4' 27"
9	Dan Martin (IRL)	Etixx–Quick-Step	+ 5' 03"
10	Fabio Aru (ITA)	Astana	+ 5' 16"

== Stage 15 ==
17 July 2016 — Bourg-en-Bresse to Culoz, 160 km (99 mi)

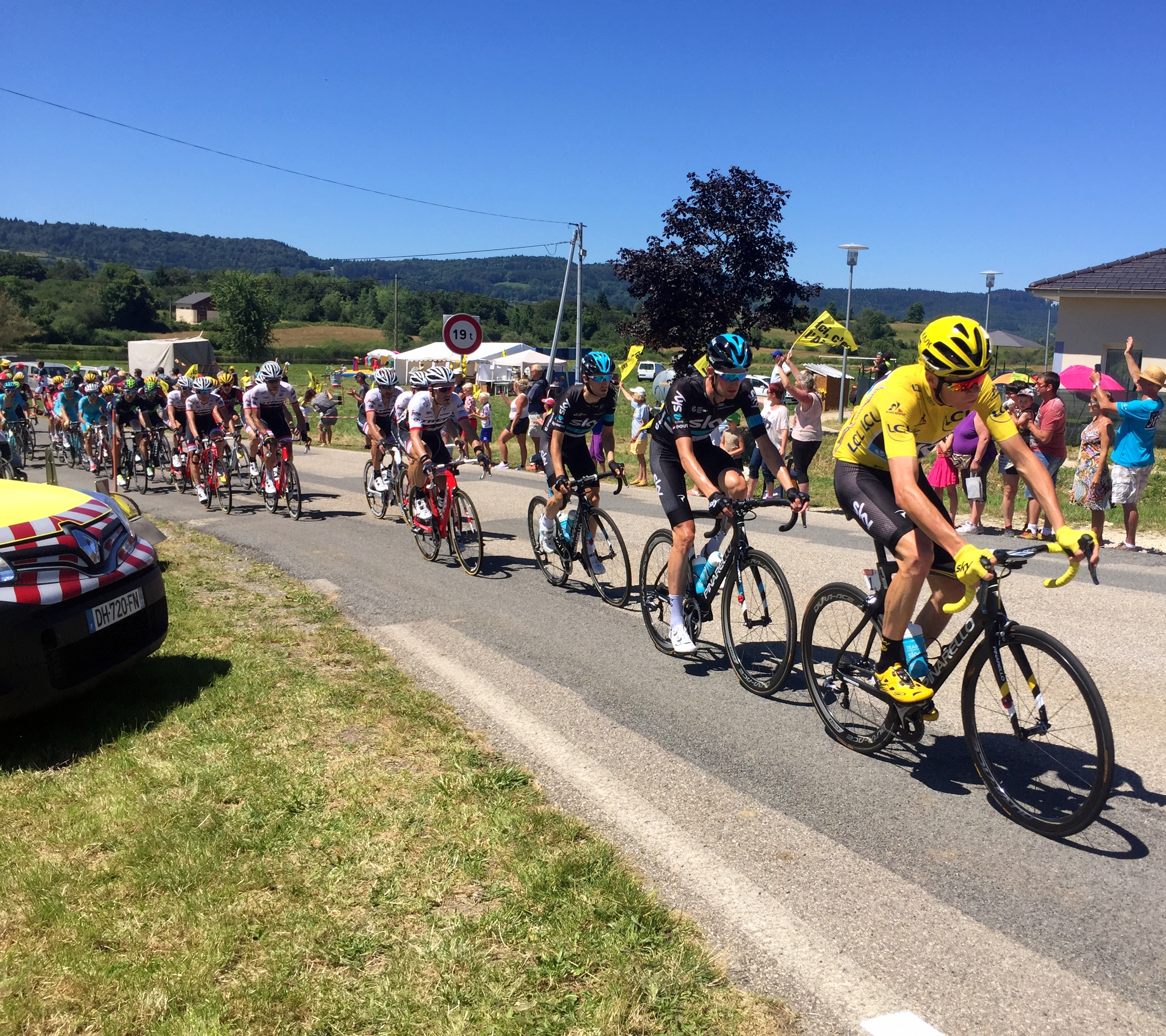
Chris Froome leading the peloton through Champdor on stage 15

This medium mountain stage departed from Bourg-en-Bresse heading east through Ceyzériat and Hautecourt-Romanèche to the Category 1 climb of the Col du Berthiand at 780 metres (2,560 ft). The route then descended south through Nurieux and Peyriat to Cerdon. The riders then took a winding route north-east to the summit of the Category 2 Col du Sappel to 794 metres (2,605 ft), slightly descending south-east to Vieu-d'Izenave before continuing into the Category 3 Col de Pisseloup to 968 metres (3,176 ft). Following a brief descent through Champdor there was an intermediate sprint at Hauteville-Lompnes, which continued east into the Category 3 Col de la Rochette to 1,113 metres (3,652 ft). The riders then descended east and south through Hotonnes and Lochieu to begin the 12.8 kilometres (8.0 mi) climb of the Hors catégorie Col du Grand Colombier to 1,501 metres (4,925 ft). Once descended via Anglefort into Culoz, the race travelled back out to the Category 1 Lacets du Grand Colombier at 891 metres (2,923 ft) descending again via Anglefort, before the finish line in Culoz itself.

Stage 15 result

Rank	Rider	Team	Time
1	Jarlinson Pantano (COL)	IAM Cycling	4h 24' 49"
2	Rafał Majka (POL)	Tinkoff	s.t.
3	Alexis Vuillermoz (FRA)	AG2R La Mondiale	+ 6"
4	Sébastien Reichenbach (SUI)	FDJ	+ 6"
5	Julian Alaphilippe (FRA)	Etixx–Quick-Step	+ 25"
6	Serge Pauwels (BEL)	Team Dimension Data	+ 25"
7	Pierre Rolland (FRA)	Cannondale–Drapac	+ 25"
8	Ilnur Zakarin (RUS)	Team Katusha	+ 1' 30"
9	Daniel Navarro (ESP)	Cofidis	+ 1' 30"
10	Tom-Jelte Slagter (NED)	Cannondale–Drapac	+ 2' 08"

General classification after stage 15

Rank	Rider	Team	Time
1	Chris Froome (GBR)	Team Sky	68h 14' 36"
2	Bauke Mollema (NED)	Trek–Segafredo	+ 1' 47"
3	Adam Yates (GBR)	Orica–BikeExchange	+ 2' 45"
4	Nairo Quintana (COL)	Movistar Team	+ 2' 59"
5	Alejandro Valverde (ESP)	Movistar Team	+ 3' 17"
6	Romain Bardet (FRA)	AG2R La Mondiale	+ 4' 04"
7	Richie Porte (AUS)	BMC Racing Team	+ 4' 27"
8	Tejay van Garderen (USA)	BMC Racing Team	+ 4' 47"
9	Dan Martin (IRL)	Etixx–Quick-Step	+ 5' 03"
10	Fabio Aru (ITA)	Astana	+ 5' 16"

== Stage 16 ==
18 July 2016 — Moirans-en-Montagne to Bern, 209 km (130 mi)

This medium mountain stage departed from Moirans-en-Montagne heading north to Pont-du-Navoy, where the race turned east for Champagnole and Censeau. Winding east to Malbuisson, the route then took a turn north-east towards Verrières-de-Joux. The riders then entered Switzerland and travelled through Rochefort, Colombier and Neuchâtel before an intermediate sprint at Ins. Continuing east through Kerzers, the race ascended the Category 4 Côte de Mühleberg to 552 metres (1,811 ft). Following a shallow descent through Frauenkappelen and Köniz was the finish line in Bern.

Stage 16 result

Rank	Rider	Team	Time
1	Peter Sagan (SVK)	Tinkoff	4h 26' 02"
2	Alexander Kristoff (NOR)	Team Katusha	s.t.
3	Sondre Holst Enger (NOR)	IAM Cycling	s.t.
4	John Degenkolb (GER)	Team Giant–Alpecin	s.t.
5	Michael Matthews (AUS)	Orica–BikeExchange	s.t.
6	Fabian Cancellara (SUI)	Trek–Segafredo	s.t.
7	Sep Vanmarcke (BEL)	LottoNL–Jumbo	s.t.
8	Maximiliano Richeze (ARG)	Etixx–Quick-Step	s.t.
9	Edvald Boasson Hagen (NOR)	Team Dimension Data	s.t.
10	Greg Van Avermaet (BEL)	BMC Racing Team	s.t.

General classification after stage 16

Rank	Rider	Team	Time
1	Chris Froome (GBR)	Team Sky	72h 40' 38"
2	Bauke Mollema (NED)	Trek–Segafredo	+ 1' 47"
3	Adam Yates (GBR)	Orica–BikeExchange	+ 2' 45"
4	Nairo Quintana (COL)	Movistar Team	+ 2' 59"
5	Alejandro Valverde (ESP)	Movistar Team	+ 3' 17"
6	Romain Bardet (FRA)	AG2R La Mondiale	+ 4' 04"
7	Richie Porte (AUS)	BMC Racing Team	+ 4' 27"
8	Tejay van Garderen (USA)	BMC Racing Team	+ 4' 47"
9	Dan Martin (IRL)	Etixx–Quick-Step	+ 5' 03"
10	Fabio Aru (ITA)	Astana	+ 5' 16"

== Rest day 2 ==
19 July 2016 — Bern

On the second rest day, Mark Cavendish and Rohan Dennis withdrew from the race to concentrate on their preparations for the men's omnium and the men's road time trial, respectively, at the 2016 Summer Olympics.

== Stage 17 ==
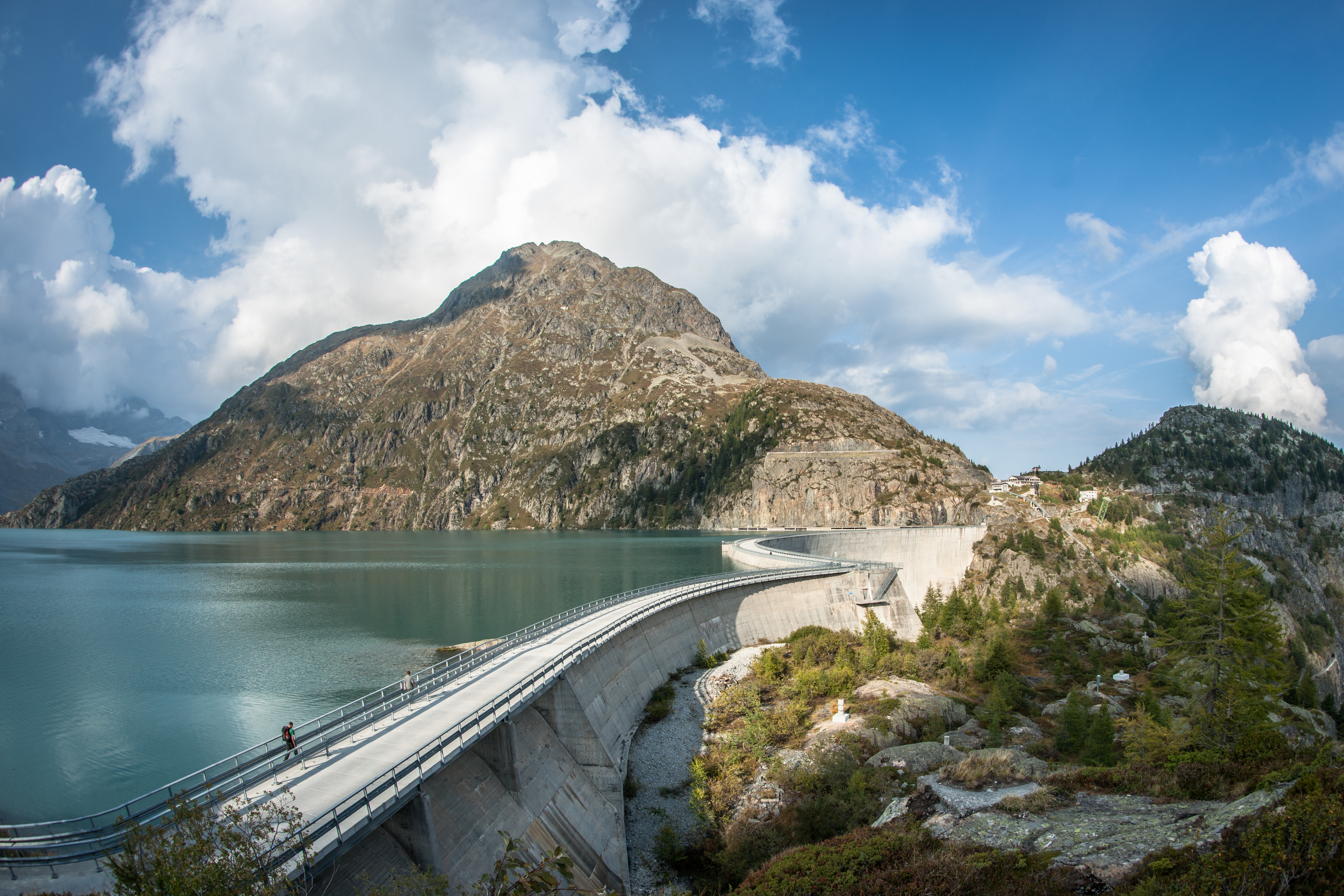
The finish line of stage 17 was at the Émosson Dam, in the Swiss Alps.

20 July 2016 — Bern to Finhaut-Émosson, 184.5 km (115 mi)

This mountainous stage departed from Bern heading south through Wattenwil to Reutigen, where the race turned west for Oberwil im Simmental and Boltigen. The race then headed south to ascend the Category 3 Côte de Saanenmöser and descended east to the plateau at Rougemont. The route then winded, ascending south through Château-d'Œx to the Category 3 Col des Mosses at 1,445 metres (4,741 ft). After descending south-west to the valley floor at Aigle, the race turned south to travel through Saint-Maurice to an intermediate sprint at Martigny. The riders then began to wind west for the 13 kilometres (8.1 mi) ascent of the Category 1 Col de la Forclaz to 1,527 metres (5,010 ft), with a partial descent through Trient to Finhaut. The final ascent was the Hors catégorie 10.4 kilometres (6.5 mi) climb to 1,960 metres (6,430 ft) for the finish line at the Émosson Dam.

Stage 17 result

Rank	Rider	Team	Time
1	Ilnur Zakarin (RUS)	Team Katusha	4h 36' 33"
2	Jarlinson Pantano (COL)	IAM Cycling	+ 55"
3	Rafał Majka (POL)	Tinkoff	+ 1' 26"
4	Kristijan Đurasek (CRO)	Lampre–Merida	+ 1' 32"
5	Brice Feillu (FRA)	Fortuneo–Vital Concept	+ 2' 33"
6	Thomas Voeckler (FRA)	Direct Énergie	+ 2' 46"
7	Domenico Pozzovivo (ITA)	AG2R La Mondiale	+ 2' 50"
8	Stef Clement (NED)	IAM Cycling	+ 2' 57"
9	Steve Morabito (SUI)	FDJ	+ 4' 38"
10	Richie Porte (AUS)	BMC Racing Team	+ 7' 59"

General classification after stage 17

Rank	Rider	Team	Time
1	Chris Froome (GBR)	Team Sky	77h 25' 10"
2	Bauke Mollema (NED)	Trek–Segafredo	+ 2' 27"
3	Adam Yates (GBR)	Orica–BikeExchange	+ 2' 53"
4	Nairo Quintana (COL)	Movistar Team	+ 3' 27"
5	Romain Bardet (FRA)	AG2R La Mondiale	+ 4' 15"
6	Richie Porte (AUS)	BMC Racing Team	+ 4' 27"
7	Alejandro Valverde (ESP)	Movistar Team	+ 5' 19"
8	Fabio Aru (ITA)	Astana	+ 5' 35"
9	Dan Martin (IRL)	Etixx–Quick-Step	+ 5' 50"
10	Louis Meintjes (RSA)	Lampre–Merida	+ 6' 07"

== Stage 18 ==
21 July 2016 — Sallanches to Megève, 17 km (11 mi) individual time trial (ITT)

The shortest stage of the tour was an individual time trial on mountainous road. The riders departed west from Sallanches to Domancy, where the climb began. Carrying on north, the first time check took place at the 6.5 kilometres (4.0 mi) mark at the Côte de Domancy. The road then wound uphill west to the second time check at the 10 kilometres (6.2 mi) mark at Combloux. From there, the riders continued uphill north-west to the third time check at the 13.5 kilometres (8.4 mi) mark at Les Berthelets. The route then wound north-west to the summit of the Côte des Chozeaux at 1,219 metres (3,999 ft), before a short descent to the finish line in Megève. The route was expected to take each rider around 32 minutes.

Stage 18 result

Rank	Rider	Team	Time
1	Chris Froome (GBR)	Team Sky	30' 43"
2	Tom Dumoulin (NED)	Team Giant–Alpecin	+ 21"
3	Fabio Aru (ITA)	Astana	+ 33"
4	Richie Porte (AUS)	BMC Racing Team	+ 33"
5	Romain Bardet (FRA)	AG2R La Mondiale	+ 42"
6	Thomas De Gendt (BEL)	Lotto–Soudal	+ 1' 02"
7	Jon Izagirre (ESP)	Movistar Team	+ 1' 03"
8	Joaquim Rodríguez (ESP)	Team Katusha	+ 1' 05"
9	Louis Meintjes (RSA)	Lampre–Merida	+ 1' 08"
10	Nairo Quintana (COL)	Movistar Team	+ 1' 10"

General classification after stage 18

Rank	Rider	Team	Time
1	Chris Froome (GBR)	Team Sky	77h 55' 53"
2	Bauke Mollema (NED)	Trek–Segafredo	+ 3' 52"
3	Adam Yates (GBR)	Orica–BikeExchange	+ 4' 16"
4	Nairo Quintana (COL)	Movistar Team	+ 4' 37"
5	Romain Bardet (FRA)	AG2R La Mondiale	+ 4' 57"
6	Richie Porte (AUS)	BMC Racing Team	+ 5' 00"
7	Fabio Aru (ITA)	Astana	+ 6' 08"
8	Alejandro Valverde (ESP)	Movistar Team	+ 6' 37"
9	Louis Meintjes (RSA)	Lampre–Merida	+ 7' 15"
10	Dan Martin (IRL)	Etixx–Quick-Step	+ 7' 18"

== Stage 19 ==
22 July 2016 — Albertville to Saint-Gervais Mont Blanc, 146 km (91 mi)

This mountainous stage departed from Albertville winding west over the unclassified Col de Tamié and then descending north through Faverges. The race then turned north-west towards Doussard, where there was an intermediate sprint. Continuing north through Talloires and then winding south, the riders began the Category 1 climb of the Col de la Forclaz de Montmin to 1,157 metres (3,796 ft), before descending west through Montmin and then south and west through Marlens to Ugine. The race then climbed south to the Category 2 Col de la Forclaz de Queige to 870 metres (2,850 ft). Descending west through Queige to Villard-sur-Doron, the route then wound and ascended north on a 12.4 kilometres (7.7 mi) climb to the Hors catégorie Montée de Bisanne to 1,723 metres (5,653 ft). Descending through the unclassified Col des Saisies to Notre-Dame-de-Bellecombe and turning north-east on through Megève, the route continued descending to the valley floor at Domancy. Turning south-east to head around the western outskirt of Saint-Gervais-les-Bains, the riders began the 9.8 kilometres (6.1 mi) climb, of the Category 1 ascent to 1,372 metres (4,501 ft), for the ski station of Le Bettex.

Stage 19 result

Rank	Rider	Team	Time
1	Romain Bardet (FRA)	AG2R La Mondiale	4h 14' 08"
2	Joaquim Rodríguez (ESP)	Team Katusha	+ 23"
3	Alejandro Valverde (ESP)	Movistar Team	+ 23"
4	Louis Meintjes (RSA)	Lampre–Merida	+ 23"
5	Nairo Quintana (COL)	Movistar Team	+ 26"
6	Fabio Aru (ITA)	Astana	+ 28"
7	Dan Martin (IRL)	Etixx–Quick-Step	+ 28"
8	Wout Poels (NED)	Team Sky	+ 36"
9	Chris Froome (GBR)	Team Sky	+ 36"
10	Richie Porte (AUS)	BMC Racing Team	+ 53"

General classification after stage 19

Rank	Rider	Team	Time
1	Chris Froome (GBR)	Team Sky	82h 10' 37"
2	Romain Bardet (FRA)	AG2R La Mondiale	+ 4' 11"
3	Nairo Quintana (COL)	Movistar Team	+ 4' 27"
4	Adam Yates (GBR)	Orica–BikeExchange	+ 4' 46"
5	Richie Porte (AUS)	BMC Racing Team	+ 5' 17"
6	Fabio Aru (ITA)	Astana	+ 6' 00"
7	Alejandro Valverde (ESP)	Movistar Team	+ 6' 20"
8	Louis Meintjes (RSA)	Lampre–Merida	+ 7' 02"
9	Dan Martin (IRL)	Etixx–Quick-Step	+ 7' 10"
10	Bauke Mollema (NED)	Trek–Segafredo	+ 7' 42"

== Stage 20 ==
23 July 2016 — Megève to Morzine-Avoriaz, 146.5 km (91 mi)

This mountain stage departed from Megeve heading southwest through Praz-sur-Arly to Flumet. The riders then turned north for La Giettaz and began climbing the Category 2 Col des Aravis to 1,487 metres (4,879 ft). Descending to an intermediate sprint at Le Grand-Bornand, the race turned northeast and began the Category 1 climb of the Col de la Colombière to 1,618 metres (5,308 ft). After descending through Le Reposoir, the route turned north to the valley floor at Marnaz and Thyez. Beginning a gentle ascent through Marignier and Mieussy, the riders then faced the 13.1 kilometres (8.1 mi) climb of the Category 1 Col de la Ramaz to 1,619 metres (5,312 ft). A winding descent south to Taninges followed, with a turn east through Morillon to Samoëns. There, the race ascended the Hors catégorie Col de Joux Plane to 1,691 metres (5,548 ft), before descending to the finish line at Morzine.

Stage 20 result

Rank	Rider	Team	Time
1	Jon Izagirre (ESP)	Movistar Team	4h 06' 45"
2	Jarlinson Pantano (COL)	IAM Cycling	+ 19"
3	Vincenzo Nibali (ITA)	Astana	+ 42"
4	Julian Alaphilippe (FRA)	Etixx–Quick-Step	+ 49"
5	Rui Costa (POR)	Lampre–Merida	+ 1' 43"
6	Roman Kreuziger (CZE)	Tinkoff	+ 1' 44"
7	Wilco Kelderman (NED)	LottoNL–Jumbo	+ 2' 30"
8	Joaquim Rodríguez (ESP)	Team Katusha	+ 3' 24"
9	Dan Martin (IRL)	Etixx–Quick-Step	+ 4' 12"
10	Romain Bardet (FRA)	AG2R La Mondiale	+ 4' 12"

General classification after stage 20

Rank	Rider	Team	Time
1	Chris Froome (GBR)	Team Sky	86h 21' 40"
2	Romain Bardet (FRA)	AG2R La Mondiale	+ 4' 05"
3	Nairo Quintana (COL)	Movistar Team	+ 4' 21"
4	Adam Yates (GBR)	Orica–BikeExchange	+ 4' 42"
5	Richie Porte (AUS)	BMC Racing Team	+ 5' 17"
6	Alejandro Valverde (ESP)	Movistar Team	+ 6' 16"
7	Joaquim Rodríguez (ESP)	Team Katusha	+ 6' 58"
8	Louis Meintjes (RSA)	Lampre–Merida	+ 6' 58"
9	Dan Martin (IRL)	Etixx–Quick-Step	+ 7' 04"
10	Roman Kreuziger (CZE)	Tinkoff	+ 7' 11"

== Stage 21 ==
24 July 2016 — Chantilly to Paris Champs-Élysées, 113 km (70 mi)

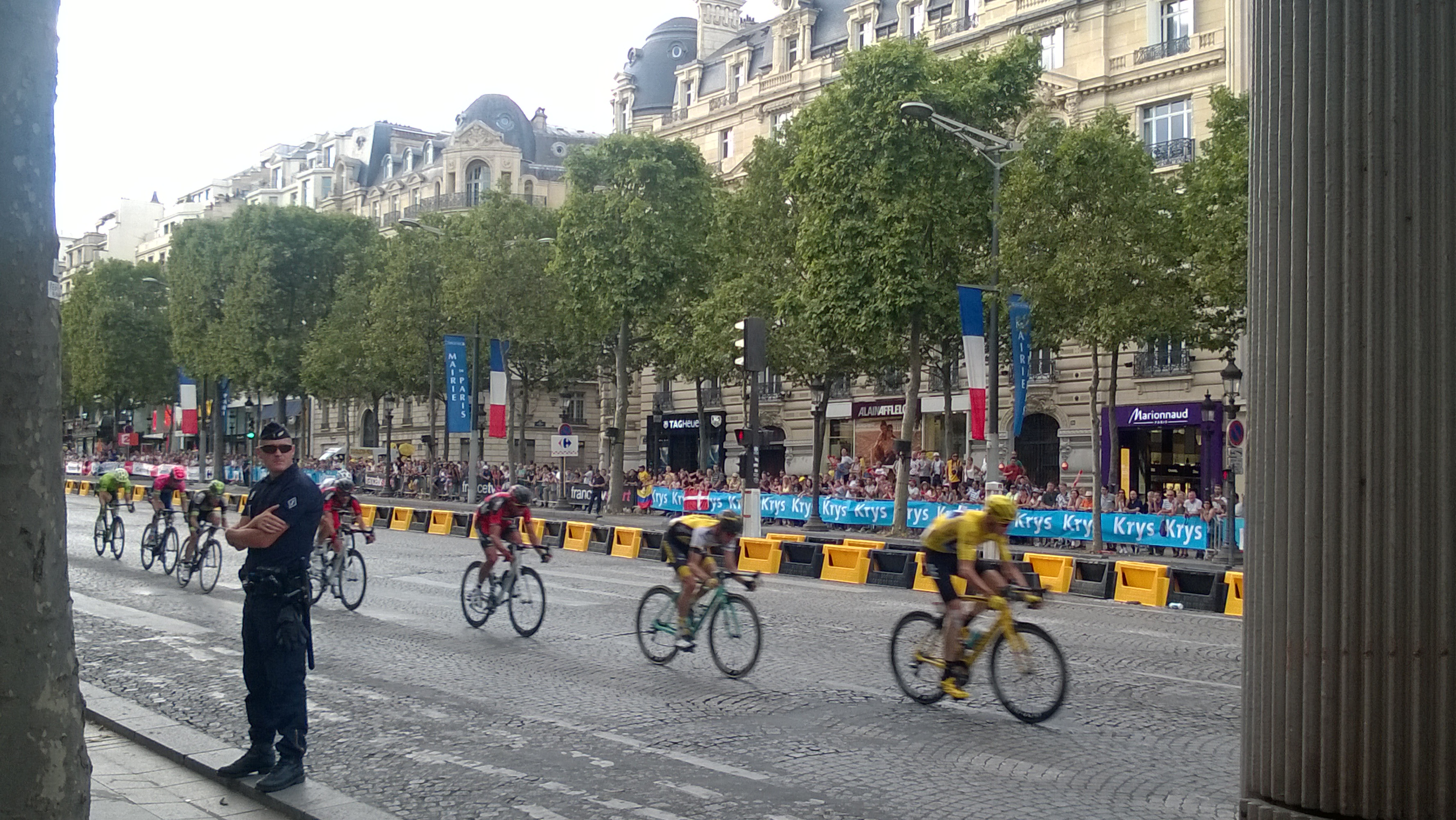
Cyclists riding down the Champs-Élysées on the final stage of the Tour de France on 24 July 2016. Race winner Chris Froome on the right.

This flat stage departed east from Chantilly, heading to Avilly-Saint-Léonard, before doubling back through Vineuil-Saint-Firmin to Gouvieux. The route then headed south through Asnières-sur-Oise, Attainville, Montlignon, Sannois and Franconville to the Category 4 climb of the Côte de l'Ermitage. The riders then descended into Argenteuil and continued south through Courbevoie to Suresnes. Heading east across the Pont de Suresnes, the riders entered Paris passing Porte Maillot and the Place Charles de Gaulle to the Place de l'Alma. Travelling alongside the River Seine, the race reached the Place de la Concorde and passed the Louvre, before turning onto the Rue de Rivoli to enter the usual circuit on the Champs-Élysées. The circuit had eight passes of the finish line, with an intermediate sprint at the top of the Champs-Élysées after the third pass of the line, before the final lap.

Stage 21 result

Rank	Rider	Team	Time
1	André Greipel (GER)	Lotto–Soudal	2h 43' 08"
2	Peter Sagan (SVK)	Tinkoff	s.t.
3	Alexander Kristoff (NOR)	Team Katusha	s.t.
4	Edvald Boasson Hagen (NOR)	Team Dimension Data	s.t.
5	Michael Matthews (AUS)	Orica–BikeExchange	s.t.
6	Jasper Stuyven (BEL)	Trek–Segafredo	s.t.
7	Ramūnas Navardauskas (LTU)	Cannondale–Drapac	s.t.
8	Christophe Laporte (FRA)	Cofidis	s.t.
9	Sam Bennett (IRL)	Bora–Argon 18	s.t.
10	Reinardt Janse van Rensburg (RSA)	Team Dimension Data	s.t.

General classification after stage 21

Rank	Rider	Team	Time
1	Chris Froome (GBR)	Team Sky	89h 04' 48"
2	Romain Bardet (FRA)	AG2R La Mondiale	+ 4' 05"
3	Nairo Quintana (COL)	Movistar Team	+ 4' 21"
4	Adam Yates (GBR)	Orica–BikeExchange	+ 4' 42"
5	Richie Porte (AUS)	BMC Racing Team	+ 5' 17"
6	Alejandro Valverde (ESP)	Movistar Team	+ 6' 16"
7	Joaquim Rodríguez (ESP)	Team Katusha	+ 6' 58"
8	Louis Meintjes (RSA)	Lampre–Merida	+ 6' 58"
9	Dan Martin (IRL)	Etixx–Quick-Step	+ 7' 04"
10	Roman Kreuziger (CZE)	Tinkoff	+ 7' 11"
