= Parc des Oiseaux =

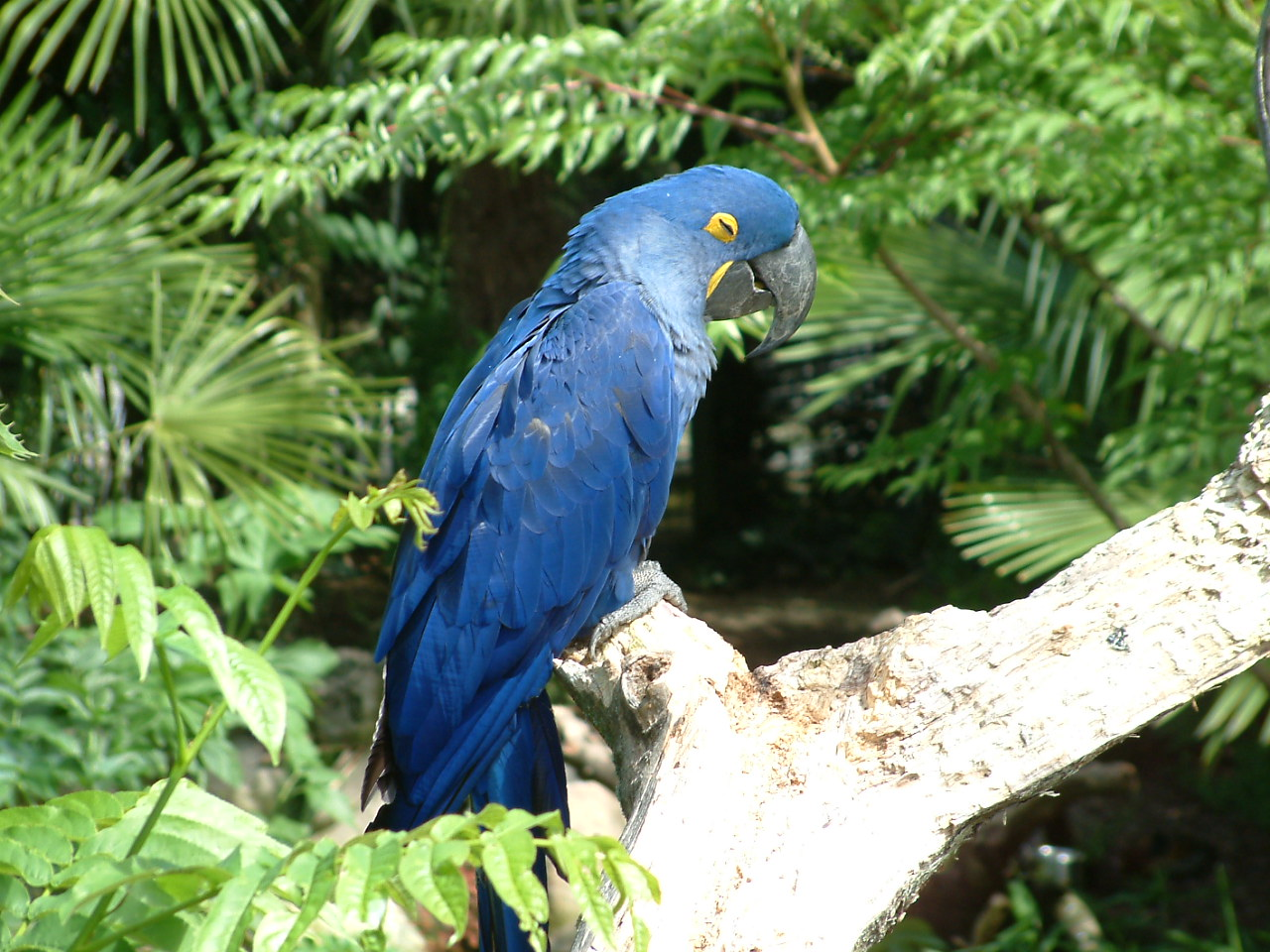
- A Hyacinth macaw at the park
- 45.99325°N 5.02665°E
- Date opened: 1970
- Location: Villars-les-Dombes, Ain, France
- Land area: 35 ha (86 acres) [in a reserve of 380 ha (940 acres)]
- No. of animals: 3000 birds
- No. of species: 300
- Website: www.parcdesoiseaux.com

The Parc des Oiseaux (English: Park of Birds) is a zoological park located in Villars-les-Dombes in the department of Ain in France. The site is recorded in the general inventory of the cultural heritage and was opened in 1970. It is one of the oldest ornithological parks in France and brings together a collection of more than 3,000 birds from around the world in a 380 ha (940 acres) reserve located in the heart of the Dombes. The section opened to the public covers an area of 35 ha (86 acres) within the reserve and welcomes on average 250,000 visitors per year.

The park is a member of the European Association of Zoos and Aquaria and the National Association of Zoological Parks, it participated in fifteen European breeding programmes for the protection and reintroduction of endangered species.

== Operation of the park ==
Three hundred bird species are represented at the Parc des Oiseaux. These represent a collection of 3,000 birds from all continents.
