= Chalet Reynard =

Ski chalet on Mont Ventoux in Vaucluse, France

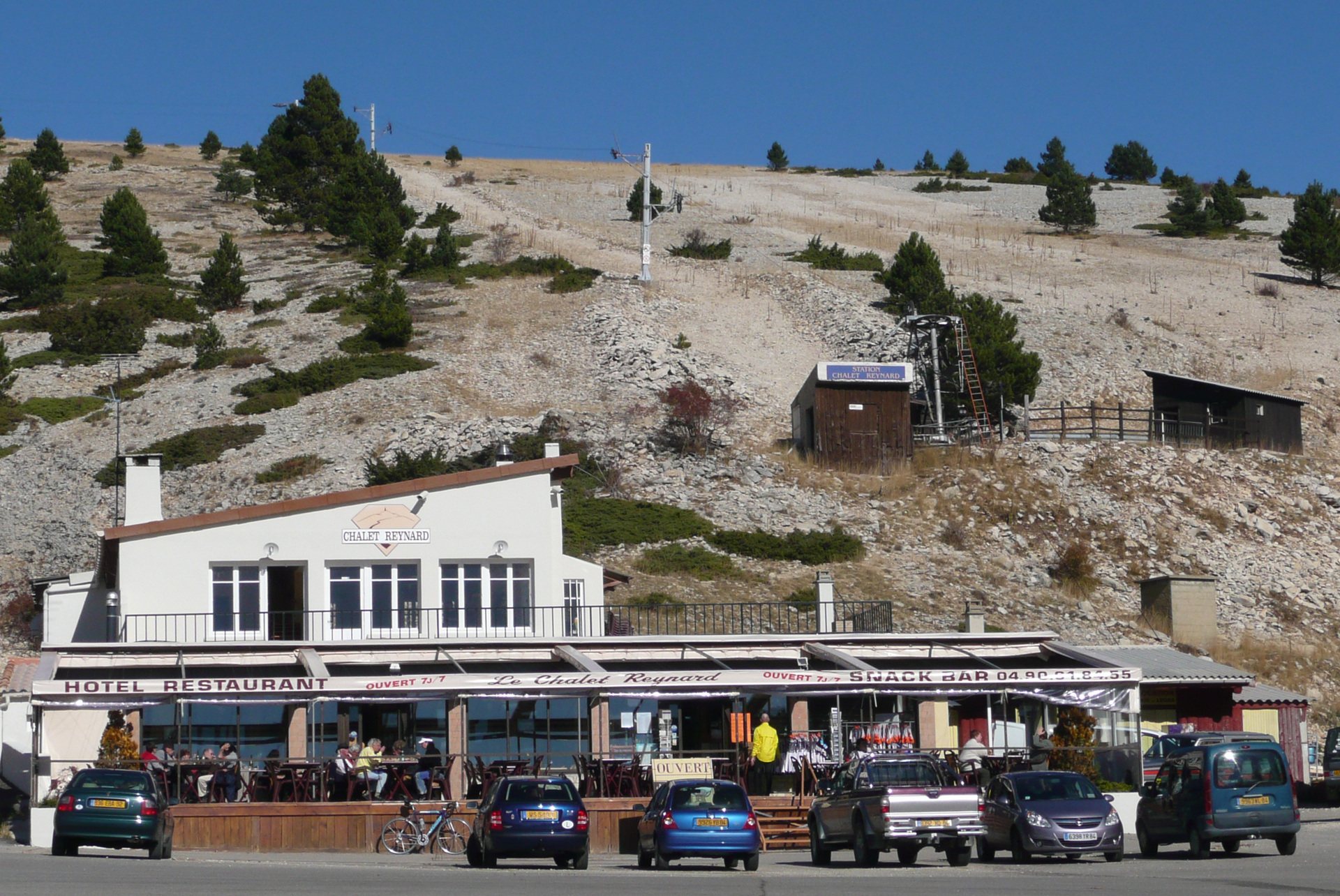
- The foot of the ski resort

- Location within Alps

General information
- Location: Mont Ventoux
- Coordinates: 44°09′09″N 5°19′09″E
- Elevation: 1,417 m (4,649 ft)
- Year built: 1927

Chalet Reynard is a former refuge turned into a restaurant at the foot of a ski resort, at an altitude of 1,417 metres (4,649 ft), on the southern face of Mont Ventoux, in the department of Vaucluse, France. The station was created in February 1927 by Pierre de Champeville.

== Access ==
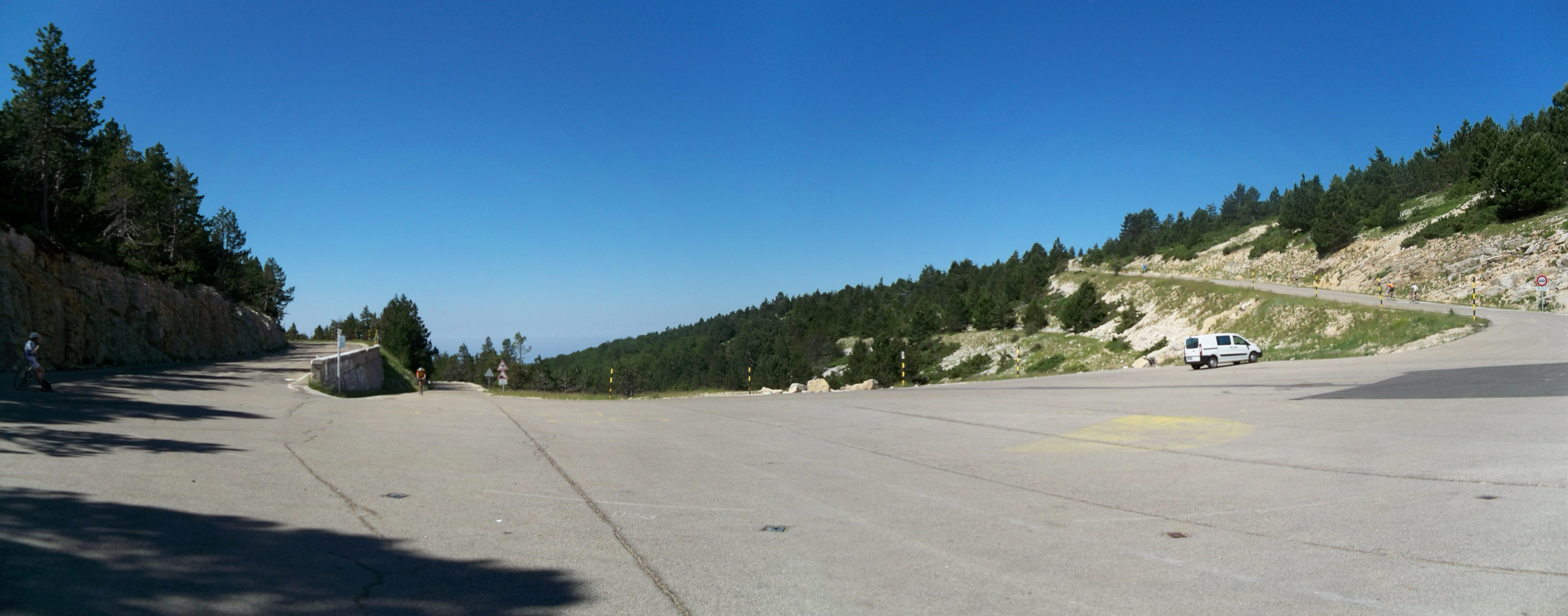
The crossroads of Chalet Reynard

Chalet Reynard is located at the intersection of the RD 974 road, connecting Bédoin to the summit of Mount Ventoux, and RD 164 joining Sault. The routes from Sault and Bédoin are accessible throughout the year. However, much of the route up Mount Ventoux is closed to traffic in winter, from November 15 to March 15, for weather reasons.

== Sport ==
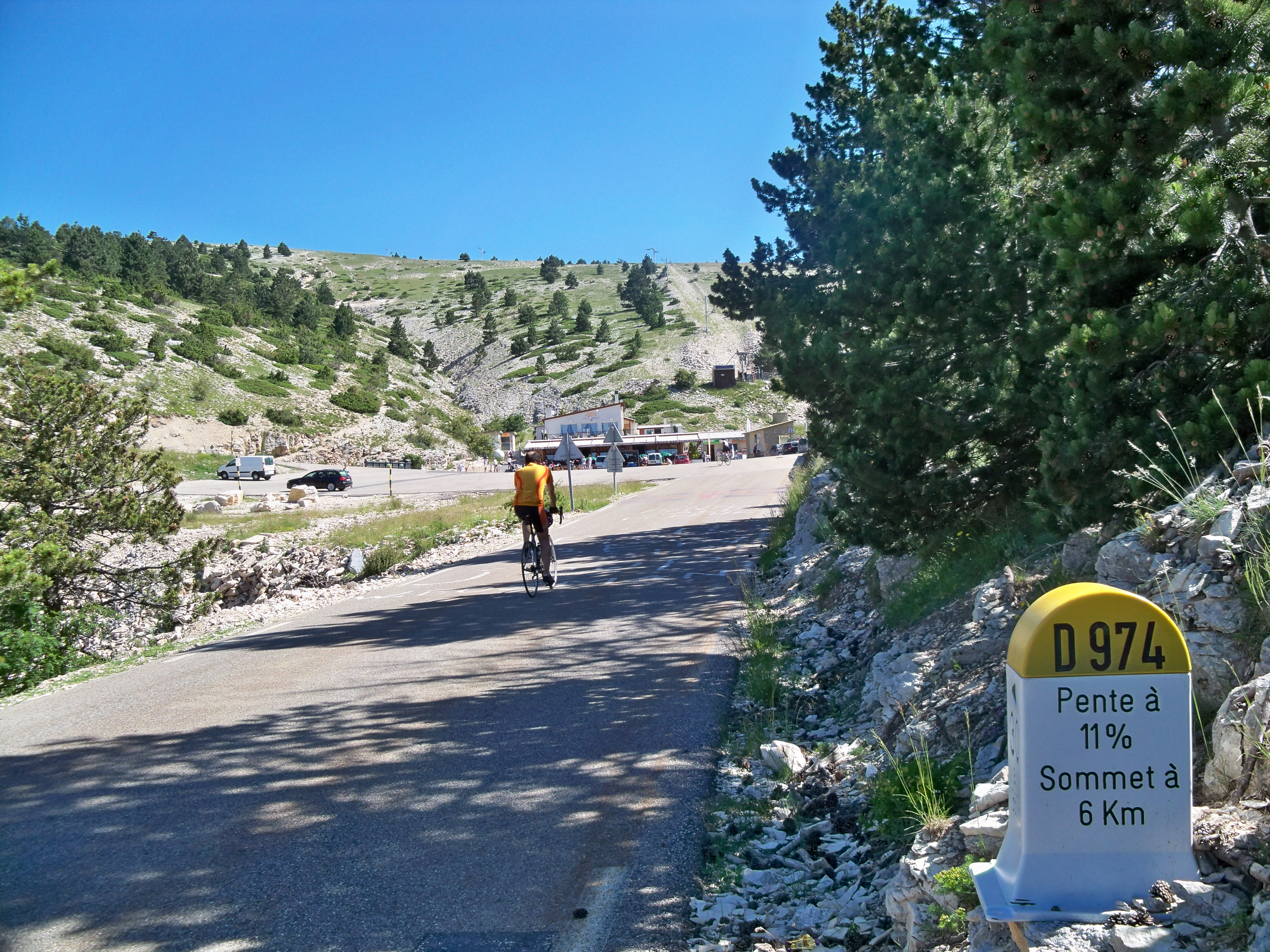
Cycling to Chalet Reynard

=== Winter sport ===
In winter, the station uses two ski lifts to reach six ski slopes, red and blue, for a total of 7 kilometres (4.3 mi) of alpine skiing. A track to practice snowshoeing is marked to reach the summit of Mont Ventoux. Down the tracks, a cottage named for the station, which is open all year, offers services, catering and a shop.

=== Sport in summer ===
Since 2011, in the summer, a bike park is accessible to MTB practitioners to use three trails, as well as a pump track (a loop built flat, consisting of a multitude of bumps, cuts and banked turns) and a training centre for initiation to the discipline.

This station has other sporting activities, especially since the beginning of the twentieth century. Apart from the Tour de France since 1951, cycling is seen as the most widely practised sport, even though the road is considered as the most difficult from Bédoin, the Chalet Reynard was also the crossing of the Mont Ventoux Hill Climb, from 1902. Two hiking trails, the GR 4 and the GR 9, also pass through the Chalet Reynard.

== Bibliography ==
- Barruol, Guy; Dautier, Nerte; Mondon, Bernard (2007). Alpes de Lumières (ed.). Le mont Ventoux. Encyclopédie d'une montagne provençale [The Mont Ventoux. Encyclopedia of a Provencal Mountain] (in French). ISBN 9782906162921. OCLC 470612182.
