= Villars-les-Dombes =

Commune in Auvergne-Rhône-Alpes, France

- Commune
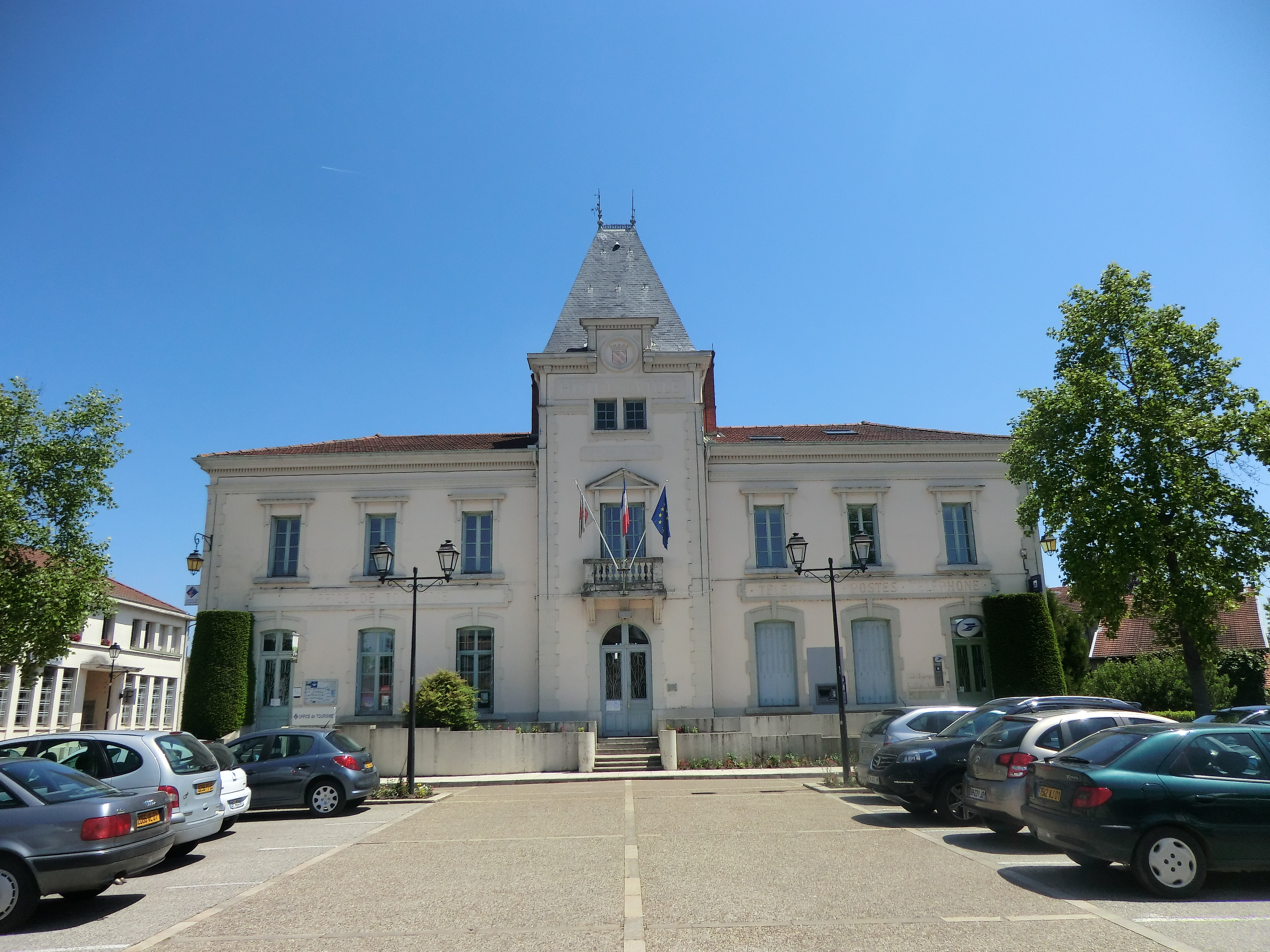
- Town hall

- Coat of arms
- Location of Villars-les-Dombes
- Location within France Location within Auvergne-Rhône-Alpes
- Coordinates: 45°59′56″N 5°01′48″E
- Country: France
- Region: Auvergne-Rhône-Alpes
- Department: Ain
- Arrondissement: Bourg-en-Bresse
- Canton: Villars-les-Dombes
- Intercommunality: Dombes

Government
  - Mayor (2026–32): Isabelle Dubois
- Area^{1}: 24.63 km^{2} (9.51 sq mi)
- Elevation: 279 m (915 ft)
- Highest elevation: 295 m (968 ft)
- Lowest elevation: 263 m (863 ft)
- Population (2023): 5,163
  - Density: 209.6/km^{2} (542.9/sq mi)
- Time zone: UTC+01:00 (CET)
  - Summer (DST): UTC+02:00 (CEST)
- INSEE/Postal code: 01443 /01330
- ^{1} French Land Register data, which excludes lakes, ponds, glaciers > 1 km^{2} (0.386 sq mi or 247 acres) and river estuaries.

Villars-les-Dombes (French pronunciation: [vilaʁ le dɔ̃b], literally Villars near Dombes; Arpitan: Velârs) is a commune in the Ain department in eastern France. Its people are known as Villardois.

== Geography ==
The town is located within Ain, half-way between Lyon (33 km) and Bourg-en-Bresse (29 km), in the heart of the area known as the Dombes, notable for its hundreds of lakes which are waterfowl habitats and are suitable for breeding fish. Its ornithological park, Parc des Oiseaux, is the largest in France.

The Chalaronne river forms part of the commune's south-western border, flows northward through the western part of the commune, crosses the town, then forms part of its northern border.

== History ==
The lordship of Villars (of which archival evidence dates from 940) became, by marriage, the lordship of Thoire-et-Vilars in 1188, and in about 1400 its caput was Trévoux (the estate was managed from there). In 1565, Villars was promoted to a marquisate dependent on the house of Savoie (Savoy), a benefice of the Honour of Savoy.

== Population ==
Historical population

Year	Pop.	±% p.a.
1793	566	—
1800	381	−5.50%
1806	528	+5.59%
1821	513	−0.19%
1831	588	+1.37%
1836	654	+2.15%
1841	789	+3.82%
1846	1,036	+5.60%
1851	1,153	+2.16%
1856	1,094	−1.05%
1861	1,111	+0.31%
1866	1,304	+3.26%
1872	1,473	+2.05%
1876	1,612	+2.28%
1881	1,535	−0.97%
1886	1,607	+0.92%
1891	1,482	−1.61%
1896	1,426	−0.77%
1901	1,482	+0.77%

Year	Pop.	±% p.a.
1906	1,524	+0.56%
1911	1,616	+1.18%
1921	1,429	−1.22%
1926	1,370	−0.84%
1931	1,388	+0.26%
1936	1,397	+0.13%
1946	1,358	−0.28%
1954	1,334	−0.22%
1962	1,583	+2.16%
1968	1,842	+2.56%
1975	2,344	+3.50%
1982	2,796	+2.55%
1990	3,415	+2.53%
1999	4,190	+2.30%
2007	4,317	+0.37%
2012	4,430	+0.52%
2017	4,795	+1.60%
2023	5,163	+1.24%

Source: EHESS and INSEE (1968-2023)

== See also ==
- Communes of the Ain department
