= Maëva Squiban =

French cyclist

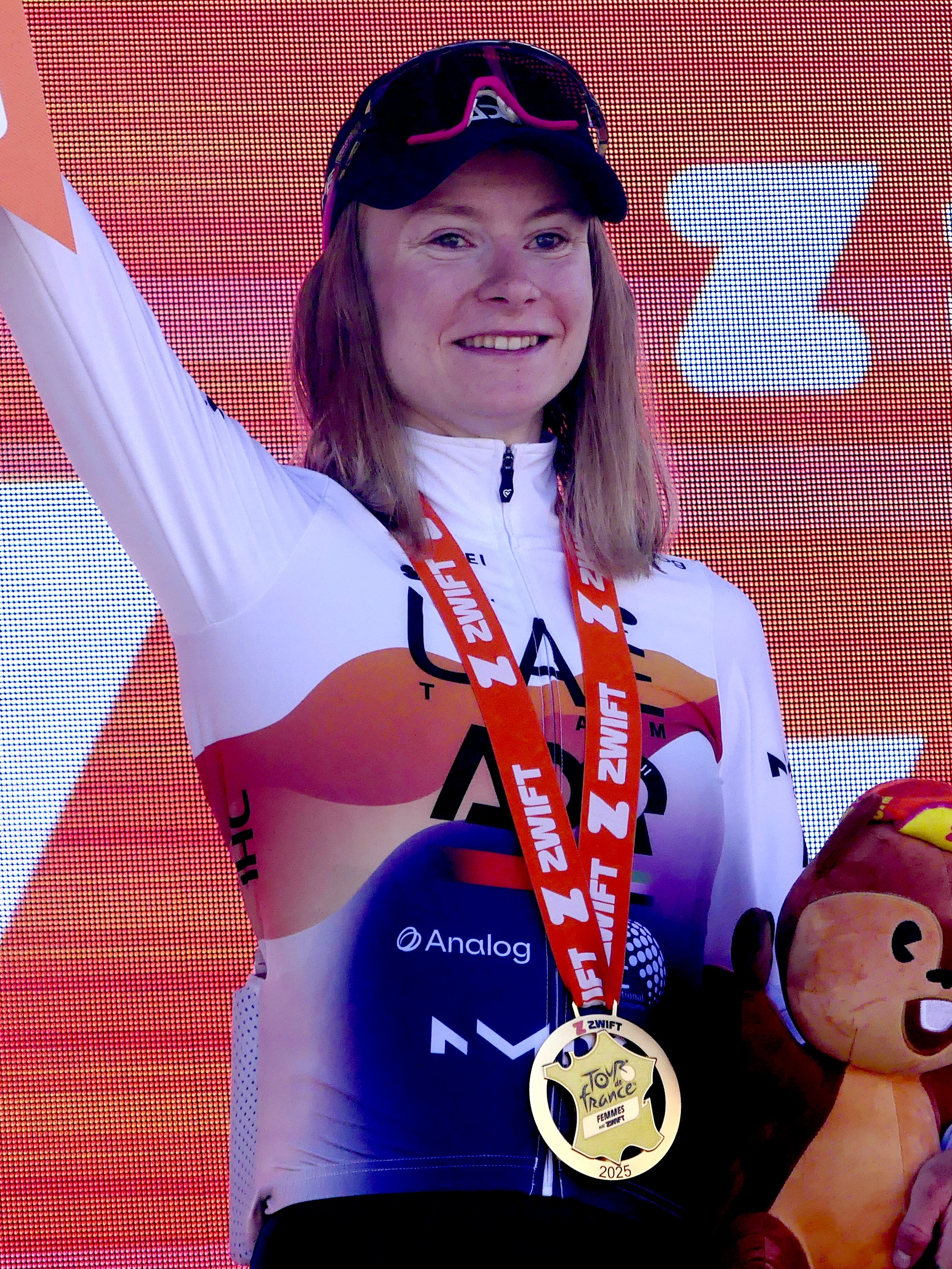
- Squiban at the 2025 Tour de France Femmes

Personal information
- Nickname: Squibbers
- Born: 19 March 2002 (age 24) Brest, France
- Height: 1.66 m (5 ft 5 in)

Cycling career
- Sport: Cycling
- Current team: UAE Team L'Imad
- Discipline: Road
- Role: Rider
- Rider type: All-rounder

Professional teams
- 2020: Stade Rochelais Charente-Maritime (stagiaire)
- 2021–2023: Stade Rochelais Charente-Maritime
- 2024: Arkéa–B&B Hotels Women
- 2025–: UAE Team ADQ

Major wins
- Major Tours Tour de France Femmes 2 individual stages (2025) Combativity award (2025)
Medal record
Women's road bicycle racing
Representing France
World Championships
Silver medal – second place	2025 Kigali	Mixed team relay
European Championships
Gold medal – first place	2026 Ljubljana	Mixed team relay

Maëva Squiban (born 19 March 2002) is a French professional racing cyclist, who rides for UCI Women's WorldTeam UAE Team L'Imad. Squiban won two stages at the 2025 Tour de France Femmes, taking the super-combativity award.

== Career ==
Born in Brest in the Brittany region of France, Squiban started cycling aged 13. After joining a cycling club, she won a silver medal at the 2019 French Junior National Time Trial Championships and won the 2019 Chrono des Nations Juniors. In August 2020 she joined Stade Rochelais Charente-Maritime as a stagiaire, and signed from 2021 a contract with the team.

Squiban rode in the 2022 Tour de France Femmes. Due to a crash in the second stage, she broke her sacrum and had to leave the Tour. At the 2024 Tour de France Femmes she finished second on stage 7 and fifth overall in the young rider classification. She took her first WorldTour race victory on stage 6 of the 2025 Tour de France Femmes, and her second on stage 7. She was subsequently awarded the super-combativity award. Following the event, Squiban was praised by the media, with Cycling Weekly calling her a "breakout star".

== Major results ==
2019
1st Chrono des Nations Juniors
2nd Time trial, National Junior Road Championships
6th Overall Omloop van Borsele
2020
European Junior Road Championships

2nd Time trial
4th Road race

4th Time trial, National Junior Road Championships
2021
National Under-23 Road Championships

2nd Road race
3rd Time trial

7th Grand Prix du Morbihan Féminin
2022
8th Alpes Grésivaudan Classic
2023
1st Stage 2 Vuelta Extremadura Féminas
National Under-23 Road Championships

2nd Time trial
3rd Road race

2024
1st Mountains classification, Tour de Normandie
3rd Overall Tour de la Semois

1st Young rider classification

National Road Championships

4th Time trial
5th Road race

5th Overall Tour Cycliste Féminin International de l'Ardèche

1st Stage 4 (ITT)

6th Trofeo Palma
7th Vuelta CV Feminas
7th Grand Prix de Wallonie
9th Giro dell'Emilia
9th Chrono des Nations
2025
Tour de France

1st Stages 6 & 7
Combativity award Stages 2, 6, 7 & Overall

2nd Team relay, UCI Road World Championships
3rd Overall Tour Cycliste Féminin International de l'Ardèche
6th Overall Vuelta a Extremadura

1st Mountains classification

8th La Périgord Ladies
2026
9th Road race, UCI Road World Championships
