= 2025 Tour de France Femmes =

Women's cycling race

2025 UCI Women's World Tour, race 22 of 27
- Route of the 2025 Tour de France Femmes

Race details
- Dates: 26 July – 3 August
- Stages: 9
- Distance: 1,168.6 km (726.1 mi)
- Winning time: 29h 54' 24"

Results
Jersey awarded to the overall winner	Winner	Pauline Ferrand-Prévot (FRA)	(Visma–Lease a Bike)
	Second	Demi Vollering (NED)	(FDJ–Suez)
	Third	Katarzyna Niewiadoma-Phinney (POL)	(Canyon//SRAM Zondacrypto)
Jersey awarded to the points classification winner	Points	Lorena Wiebes (NED)	(Team SD Worx–Protime)
Jersey awarded to the mountains classification winner	Mountains	Elise Chabbey (SUI)	(FDJ–Suez)
Jersey awarded to the young rider classification winner	Young rider	Nienke Vinke (NED)	(Team Picnic–PostNL)
Jersey awarded to the combativity classification winner	Combativity	Maëva Squiban (FRA)	(UAE Team ADQ)
Jersey awarded to the team classification winner	Team	(France) FDJ–Suez	

The 2025 Tour de France Femmes (officially Tour de France Femmes avec Zwift) was the fourth edition of the Tour de France Femmes. The race took place from 26 July to 3 August 2025 and was the 22nd race in the 2025 UCI Women's World Tour calendar. The race was organised by the Amaury Sport Organisation (ASO), which also organises the men's Tour de France. The race was extended to nine days, making it the longest Tour de France Femmes, and the longest event on the UCI Women's World Tour calendar.

The race was won by French rider Pauline Ferrand-Prévot (Visma–Lease a Bike) by over three and a half minutes, after two stage wins in the French Alps. Second place was 2023 winner Demi Vollering (FDJ–Suez), with defending champion Katarzyna Niewiadoma-Phinney (Canyon//SRAM Zondacrypto) in third. Ferrand-Prévot was the first French winner of the Tour de France Femmes, and the first French win at the Tour de France since Bernard Hinault at the 1985 Tour de France and Jeannie Longo at the 1989 Tour de France Féminin.

In the race's other classifications, Lorena Wiebes (Team SD Worx–Protime) won the green jersey of the points classification. Elise Chabbey (FDJ–Suez) took the polka-dot jersey as the winner of the Queen of the Mountains classification. Nienke Vinke (Team Picnic–PostNL) took the white jersey as the winner of the young riders classification, which was awarded to the best-placed rider under the age of 23. Maëva Squiban (UAE Team ADQ) took the combativity award, after wins on stages 6 and 7. FDJ–Suez won the team classification as the team with the lowest aggregate time among their three best-placed riders.

The race was widely praised, with large crowds attending the Grand Départ in Brittany, record television audiences in France, and accolades for winner Pauline Ferrand-Prévot, who was hailed as a national icon. L'Équipe stated that Ferrand-Prévot's victory had led to "unprecedented enthusiasm in women's cycling", with media calling it the most successful edition of the race.

== Teams ==
Twenty-two teams took part in the race. The teams were announced on 2 April 2025. All 15 UCI Women's WorldTeams were automatically invited. They were joined by seven UCI Women's ProTeams – the two best 2024 UCI Women's Continental Teams (EF Education–Oatly and VolkerWessels Women Cyclingteam) received an automatic invitation, and the other five teams were selected by ASO, the organisers of the Tour. A total of 154 riders from 30 nationalities started the race, with the Netherlands having the largest contingent (34 riders).

UCI Women's WorldTeams

- AG Insurance–Soudal
- Canyon//SRAM Zondacrypto
- Ceratizit Pro Cycling
- FDJ–Suez
- Fenix–Deceuninck
- Human Powered Health
- Lidl–Trek
- Liv AlUla Jayco
- Movistar Team
- Roland Le Dévoluy
- Team Picnic–PostNL
- Team SD Worx–Protime
- UAE Team ADQ
- Uno-X Mobility
- Visma–Lease a Bike

UCI Women's ProTeams

- Arkéa–B&B Hotels Women
- Cofidis
- EF Education–Oatly
- Laboral Kutxa–Fundación Euskadi
- St. Michel–Preference Home–Auber93
- VolkerWessels Cycling Team
- Winspace Orange Seal

== Route and stages ==
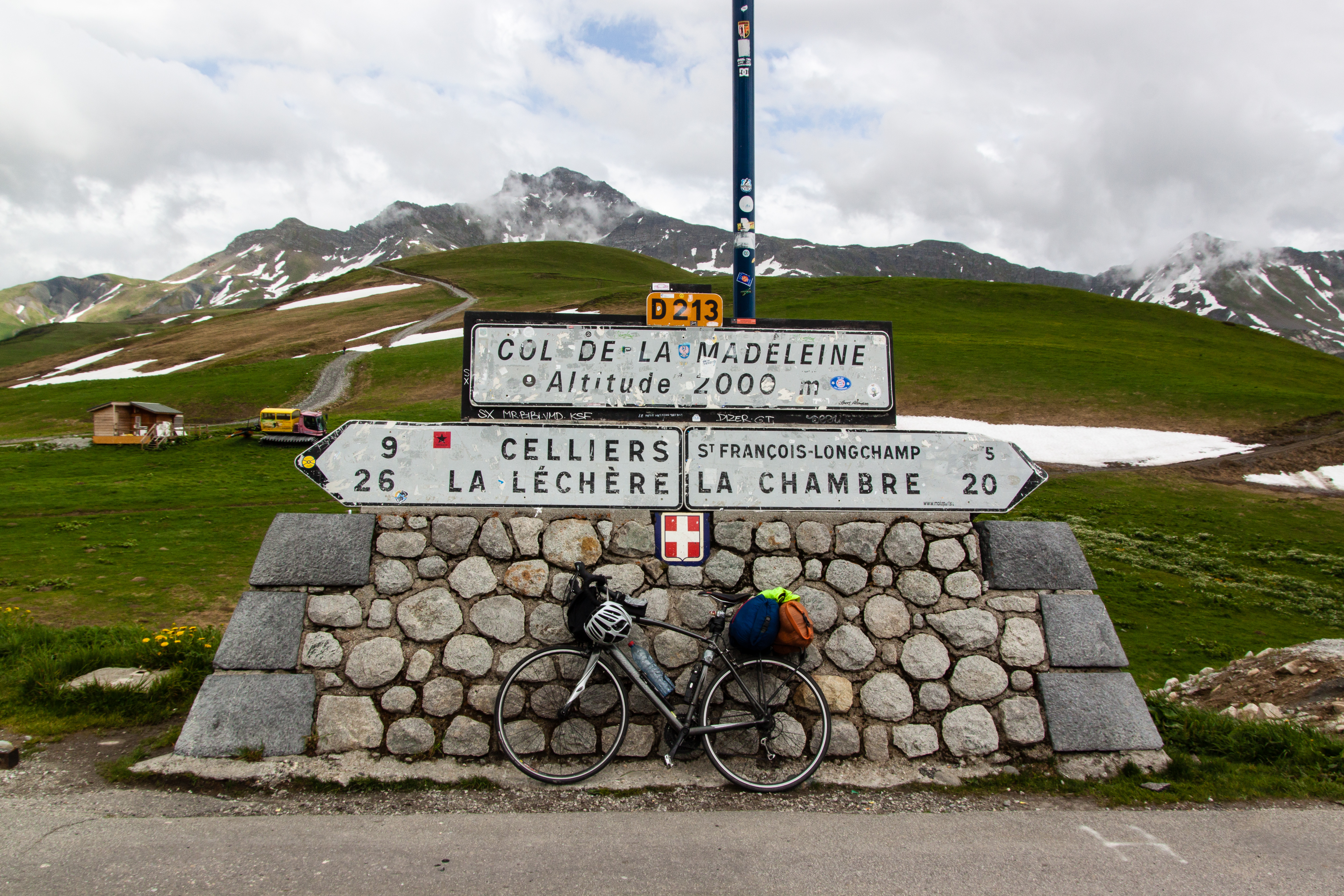
Stage 8 had a summit finish at Col de la Madeleine, at an elevation of 2,000 m (6,600 ft)

The race took place immediately after the men's tour, returning to its late-July spot in the calendar. In June 2024, it was announced that the Tour de France Femmes would have a Grand Départ in Brittany in northwestern France — with three stages in the region. Furthermore, the length of the race would be extended to nine days, with nine stages.

Prior to the route announcement, it was rumoured that the race would again visit the Alps. In October 2024, the full route was announced by race director Marion Rousse. It comprised nine days of racing with nine stages, covering a total of 1,168.6 km (726.1 mi) with 17,240 metres (56,560 ft) of elevation gain. The first two stages took place in Brittany, before heading east across France towards the Alps via the Massif Central. The final two stages took place in the Alps, with the queen stage on stage 8 culminating with a summit finish at the Col de la Madeleine at an elevation of 2,000 m (6,600 ft). The Col de la Madeleine had previously been tackled by the women's professional peloton, including twice during the 2002 Grande Boucle Féminine Internationale. The final stage featured Col de Joux Plane, with a finish at the ski resort of Châtel – Les Porte des Soleil. Climbs were categorised from category 4 (the easiest) to hors catégorie (the most difficult), with 2 hors catégorie climbs on the route.

The route did not feature a time trial, unlike the previous two editions, with organisers citing the longer overall distance across France as the reason. Rousse noted that the course was harder and longer, stating that "from the Thursday to the Sunday it's either medium- or high-mountain stages".

Reacting to the route, Cyclist considered that it has a "punchy start and a very tough final few stages", with Rouleur stating that "it's likely that these parcours could provide some extremely fiery racing" and that the lack of a time trial was the "only glaring omission from the route". L'Équipe noted that the "demanding course" and longer length "reinforces the idea that the event has grown". Defending champion Katarzyna Niewiadoma-Phinney stated that she liked the route, but noted disappointment regarding the lack of a time-trial.

Both Marion Rousse and Rouleur noted that the changes in the women's peloton for 2025 could lead to competitive racing, with the return of four-time Giro d'Italia Women winner Anna van der Breggen and French multi-discipline world champion Pauline Ferrand-Prévot to the peloton, as well as the moves of Demi Vollering to FDJ–Suez and Elisa Longo Borghini to UAE Team ADQ.

Stage characteristics
Stage	Date	Course	Distance	Type	Winner
1	26 July	Vannes to Plumelec	78.8 km (49.0 mi)	Hilly stage	Marianne Vos (NED)
2	27 July	Brest to Quimper	110.4 km (68.6 mi)	Hilly stage	Mavi García (ESP)
3	28 July	La Gacilly to Angers	163.5 km (101.6 mi)	Flat stage	Lorena Wiebes (NED)
4	29 July	Saumur to Poitiers	130.7 km (81.2 mi)	Flat stage	Lorena Wiebes (NED)
5	30 July	Chasseneuil-du-Poitou (Futuroscope) to Guéret	165.8 km (103.0 mi)	Medium-mountain stage	Kimberley Le Court (MRI)
6	31 July	Clermont-Ferrand to Ambert	123.7 km (76.9 mi)	Mountain stage	Maëva Squiban (FRA)
7	1 August	Bourg-en-Bresse to Chambéry	159.7 km (99.2 mi)	Hilly stage	Maëva Squiban (FRA)
8	2 August	Chambéry to Saint-François-Longchamp (Col de la Madeleine)	111.9 km (69.5 mi)	Mountain stage	Pauline Ferrand-Prévot (FRA)
9	3 August	Praz-sur-Arly to Châtel	124.1 km (77.1 mi)	Mountain stage	Pauline Ferrand-Prévot (FRA)
Total			1,168.6 km (726.1 mi)		

== Race overview ==
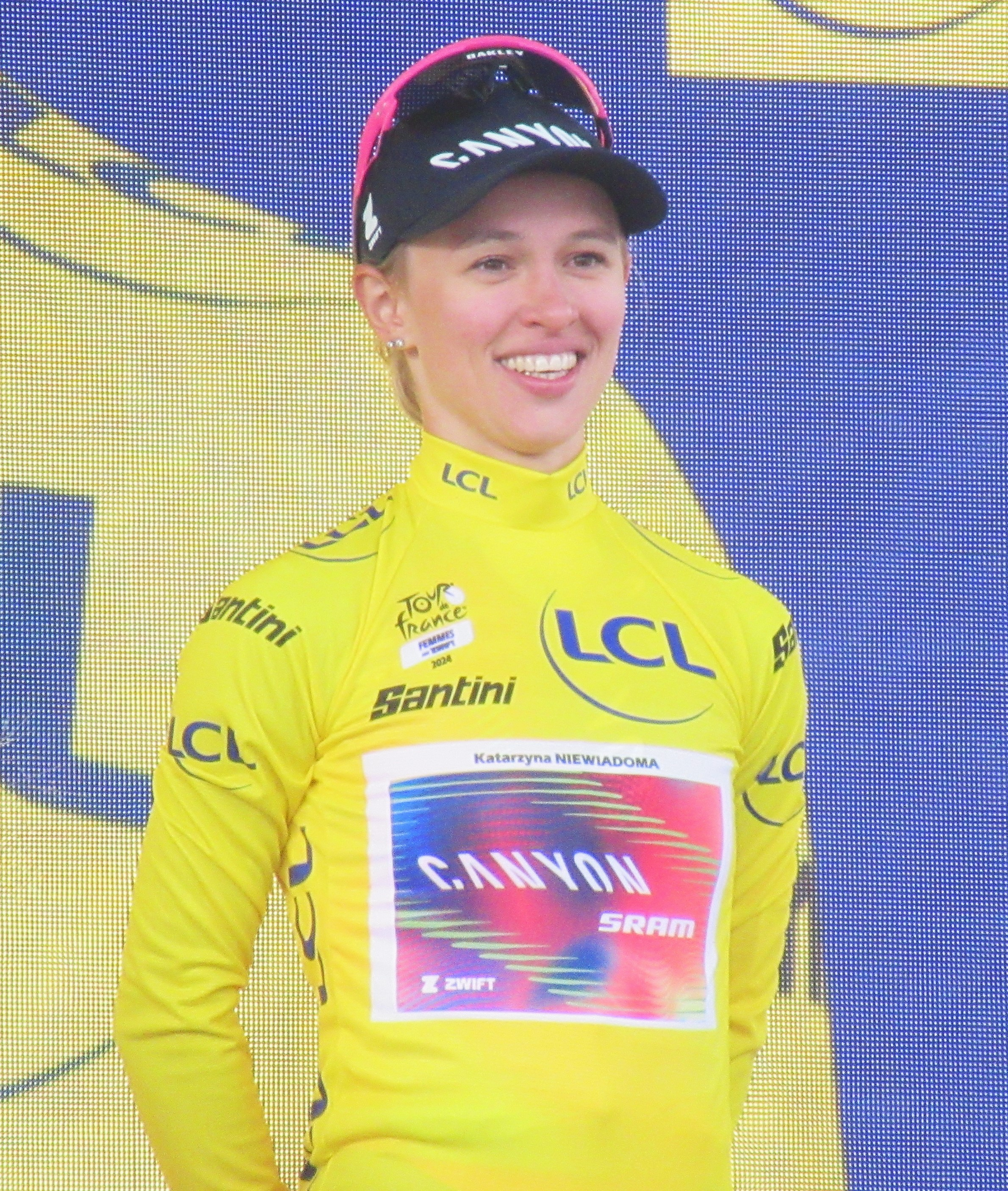
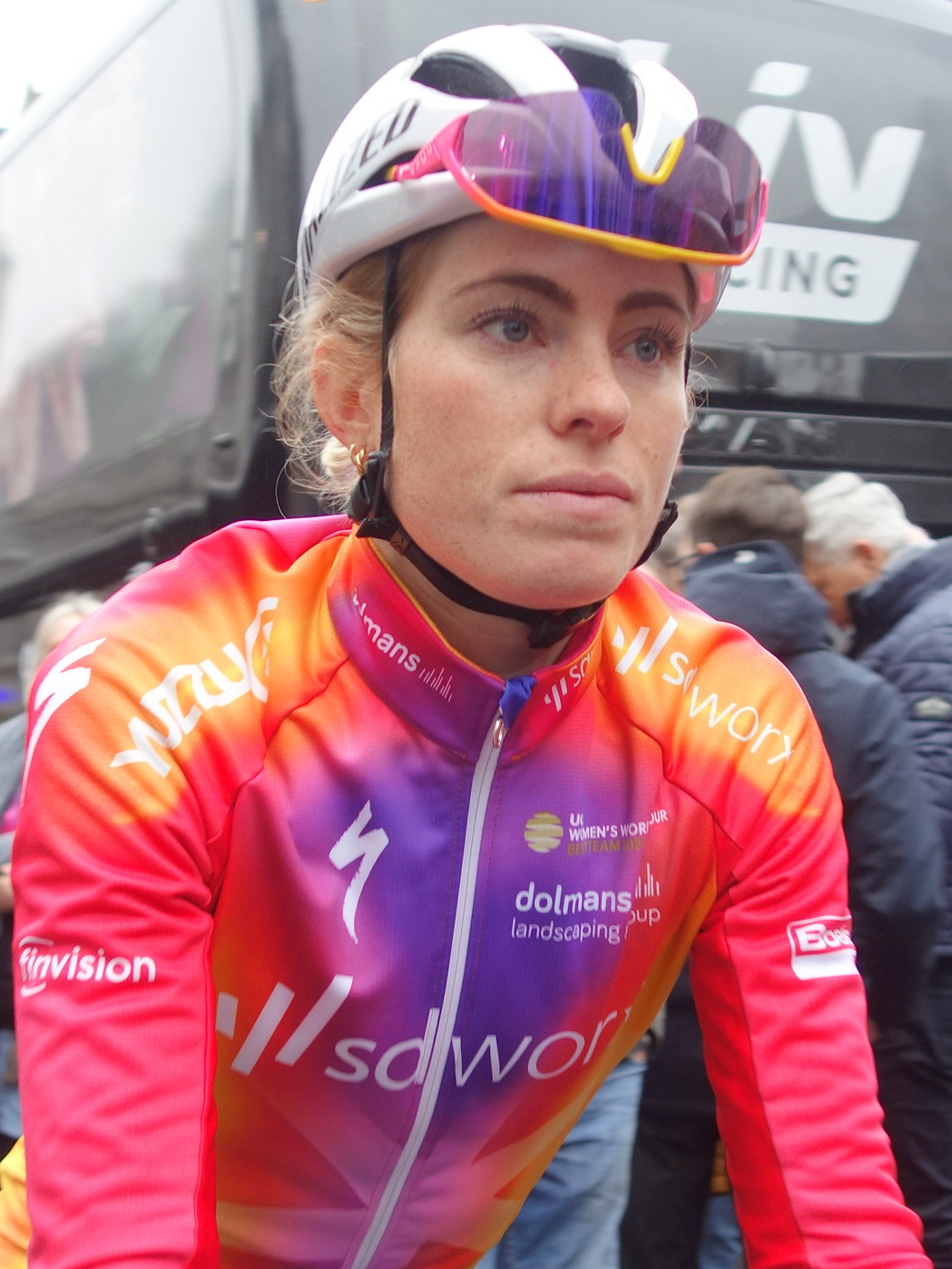
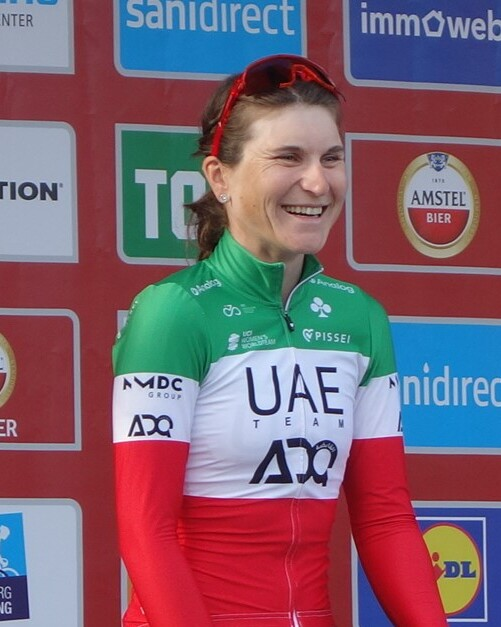
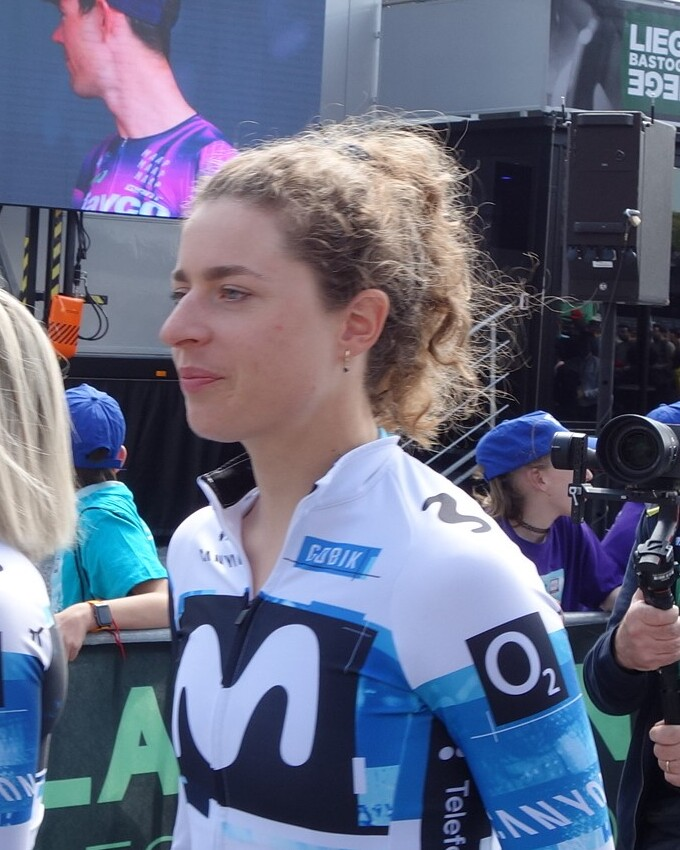
(left to right) Katarzyna Niewiadoma-Phinney, Demi Vollering, Elisa Longo Borghini and Marlen Reusser were considered favourites for the general classification (GC)

Ahead of the race, several riders were considered favourites for the general classification (GC) including defending champion Katarzyna Niewiadoma-Phinney, 2023 winner Demi Vollering (following her victory at La Vuelta Femenina and other stage races in 2025), Elisa Longo Borghini (following her victory at Giro d'Italia Women) and Marlen Reusser (following her victory at Tour de Suisse Women and strong performance at Giro d'Italia Women). French hopes rested on multi-discipline world champion Pauline Ferrand-Prévot, who returned to the professional peloton in 2025, winning Paris–Roubaix Femmes.

Lorena Wiebes and Marianne Vos were considered favourites for the points classification for best sprinter, with Vollering and Sarah Gigante tipped for the Queen of the Mountains (QoM) classification. Marion Bunel and Nienke Vinke were considered favourites for the young rider classification for best rider under the age of 23.

Media coverage prior to the event was positive, noting that the race had gone "from strength to strength", with anticipation of the "hardest edition yet" and the number of potential contenders for the GC. The prize fund increased by around 10% to around €260,000 (compared to €2.5 million for the men's tour), with €50,000 for the winner of the general classification – making it one of the richest races in women's cycling.

=== Grand Départ in Brittany ===
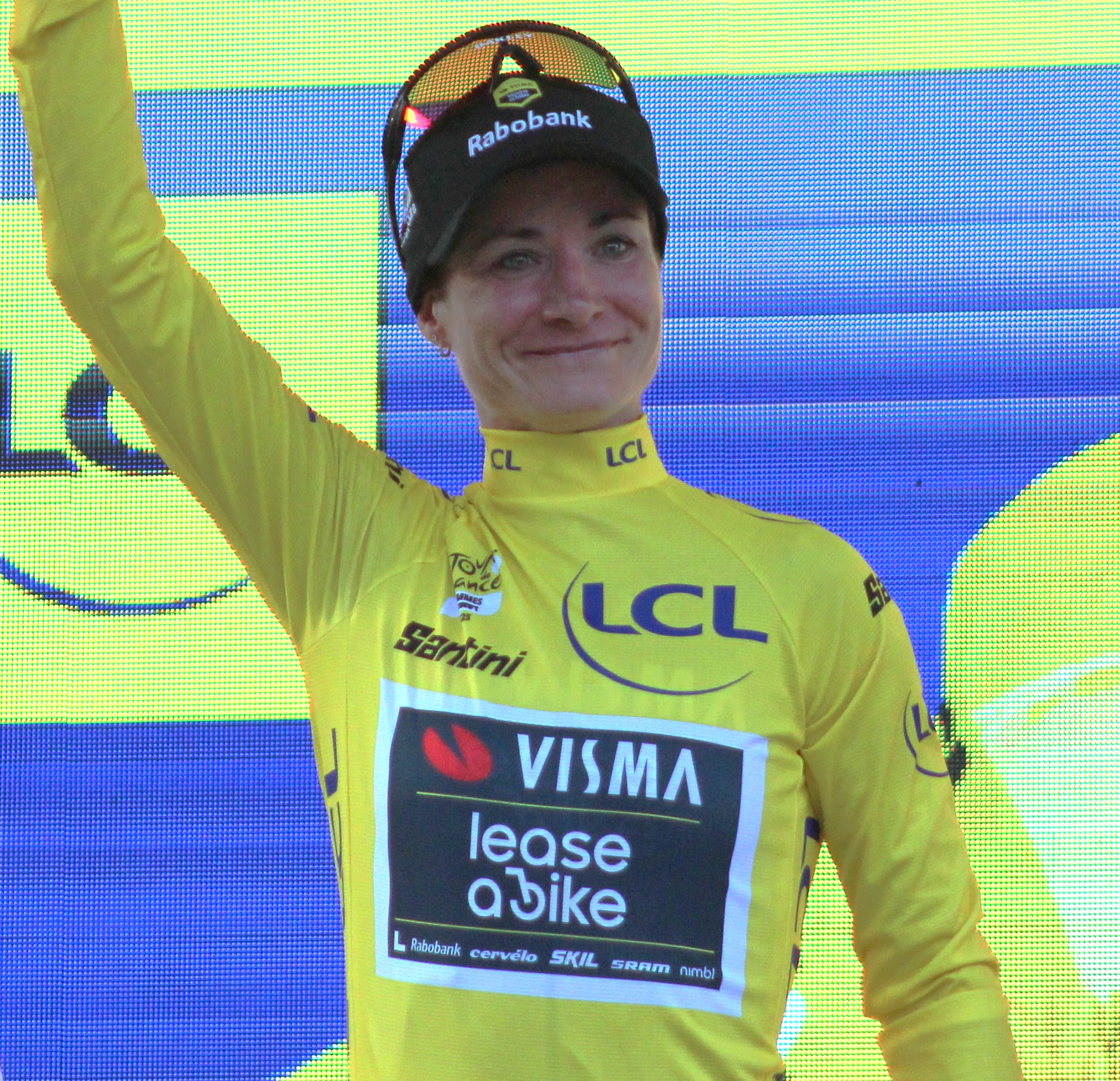
Marianne Vos, winner of stage 1 in the yellow jersey

The first stage took the riders on a hilly course to Plumelec in Brittany, the host of the Grand Départ – with the finishing circuit including three ascents of a short but steep climb. Approaching the intermediate sprint, a large crash involved Movistar Team teammates Liane Lippert and Marlen Reusser – both riders remounted, however Reusser did not rejoin the peloton. Lorena Wiebes (Team SD Worx–Protime) took the maximum points at the intermediate sprint. With 13 kilometres (8.1 mi) remaining, the peloton tackled the climb for the second time, with Elise Chabbey (FDJ–Suez) taking the lead in the Queen of the Mountains (QoM) classification. In the closing stages, several riders attempted to break out to win the stage, with Visma–Lease a Bike chasing them back. In the uphill sprint for the finish line, Pauline Ferrand-Prévot (Visma–Lease a Bike) looked set to win before tiring, with Kimberley Le Court (AG Insurance–Soudal) and then Marianne Vos (Visma–Lease a Bike) overtaking her – Vos won the third Tour stage in her career, taking the yellow jersey of the general classification (GC) as well as taking the lead in the points classification. Julie Bego (Cofidis) took the lead of the young rider classification. Other GC contenders finished in the bunch, with the exception of Reusser who abandoned the race, suffering from illness that had previously affected her at the Giro d'Italia Women.

Stage two remained in Brittany, with a hilly stage to Quimper. Prior to the start of the stage, Charlotte Kool (Team Picnic–PostNL) withdrew after struggling following a crash at the Baloise Ladies Tour earlier in July. At the intermediate sprint, Wiebes took the maximum remaining points behind the breakaway. After the break was caught, a trio of riders including Chabbey in the polka dot jersey of the QoM classification escaped the peloton with around 60 kilometres (37 mi), with Chabbey then stretching her lead in the QoM classification to 4 points over the climbs. They were caught with 12 kilometres (7.5 mi) remaining, with Mavi García (Liv AlUla Jayco) attacking on a descent soon after, pulling out a lead of 15 seconds. García held off the peloton, entering the final kilometres with a 10-second lead. The peloton gave chase on the steep climb to the finish, however García held on to take her first stage win at the Tour, with Wiebes in second place just 3 seconds behind. García was delighted by her win, noting that at 41 years old (the oldest rider in the race) she had considered retirement from cycling. Le Court took the yellow jersey of the GC owing to her higher placed stage finishes, being level on time with Vos. Other GC contenders remained within 20 seconds. Vos and Bego maintained their leads in the points and youth classifications respectively.

The third stage took riders eastwards from La Gacilly in Brittany to Angers on a flat course, with one fourth-category climb early on in the stage. Prior to the start of the stage, Elisa Longo Borghini (UAE Team ADQ) withdrew from the race after struggling with gastroenteritis for the first two stages – the second GC contender to abandon the race. A four-rider group got away in the early part of the stage, staying away for the majority of the stage. Heading into the final 10 kilometres (6.2 mi), the break still had a lead of half a minute but the cohesion began to dwindle down as they soon attacked each other – they were caught by the peloton with just under 6 kilometres (3.7 mi) remaining. 3.3 kilometres (2.1 mi) from the finish, a big crash took down several riders, most notably including Demi Vollering (FDJ–Suez), one of the favourites for the GC. Vollering had to be helped by her teammates to reach the finish line, with her team reporting that she had "pain at the knees, a pain at the glutes and pain at the back" and that she would be checked at the hospital. In the final sprint, Wiebes outsprinted Vos to win the stage, taking the lead in the points classification. With her second place, Vos regained the yellow jersey from Le Court.

=== Heading southeast across France ===
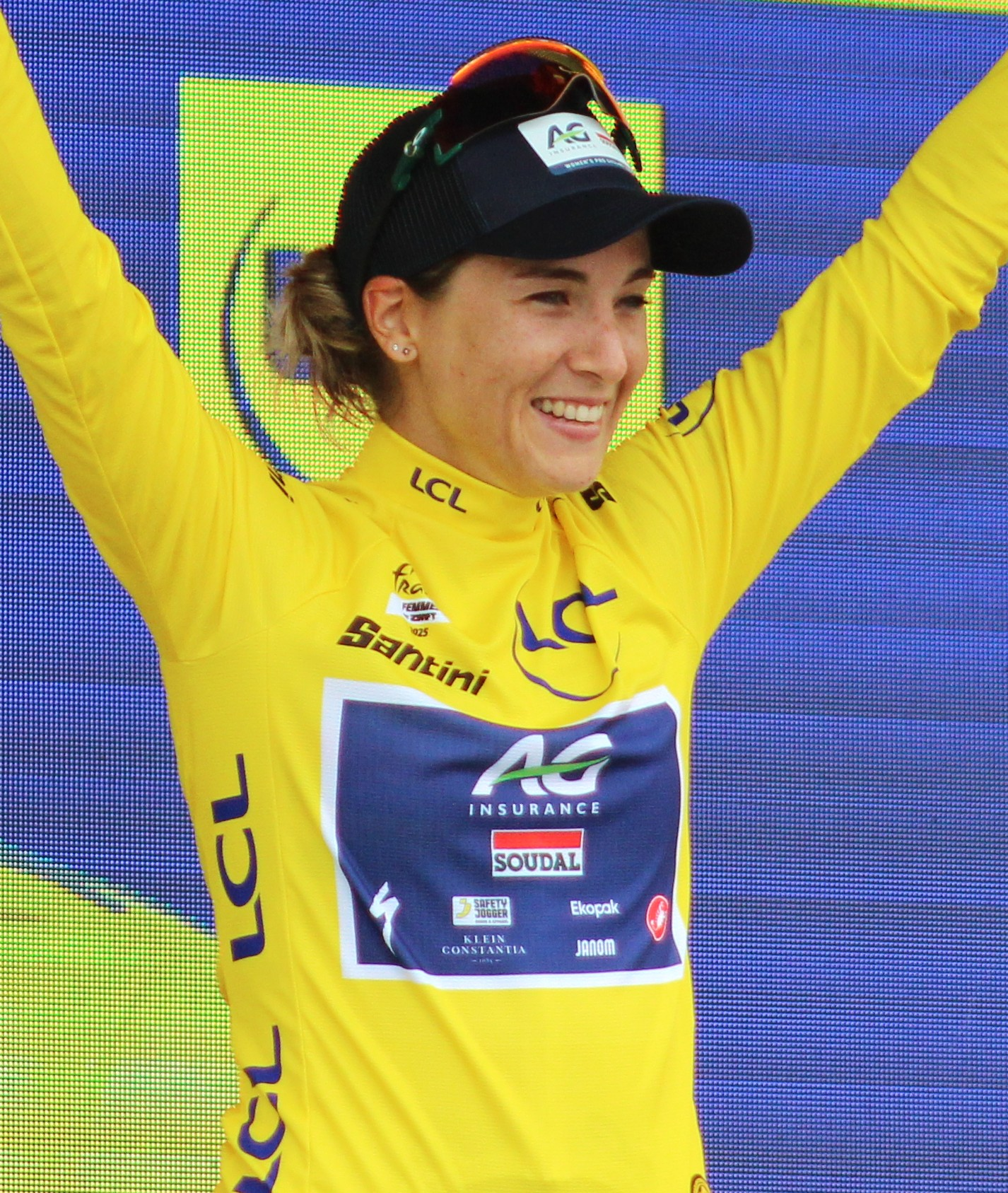
Kimberley Le Court, winner of stage 5 in the yellow jersey

The fourth stage headed southeast to Poitiers on a flat course. Before the stage, FDJ–Suez announced that Vollering was cleared to start after tests following her crash on stage 3. As the race approached the intermediate sprint with 44 kilometres (27 mi) to go, a duo break took maximum points before Wiebes crossed the line in front of Vos to extend her lead in the points classification. After the break was caught with around 4 kilometres (2.5 mi) left, the race headed to the expected bunch sprint, where Wiebes was able to hold off Vos to win her second successive stage.

The fifth stage from Jaunay-Marigny (Futuroscope) to Guéret was the longest stage of the race at 165.8 kilometres (103.0 mi), heading eastwards towards the Alps. The medium mountain stage tackled three categorised climbs (one third-category and two fourth-category), all taking place in the last 30 km (19 mi). Five riders formed the day's main break, leading by almost five minutes at one point before Brodie Chapman (UAE Team ADQ) soloed off the front on the second climb. She was caught at the foot of Le Maupuy, the final climb. On the climb, GC contenders including Le Court, Ferrand-Prévot, Vollering, Katarzyna Niewiadoma-Phinney (Canyon//SRAM Zondacrypto), Anna van der Breggen (Team SD Worx–Protime), Pauliena Rooijakkers (Fenix–Premier Tech), and Sarah Gigante (AG Insurance–Soudal) were able to get a gap, with Le Court, Ferrand-Prévot, and Niewiadoma-Phinney taking the bonus seconds available at the top of the climb. The GC group held off the chasing pack behind, contesting the stage in a sprint. Le Court held off Vollering in a photo-finish to win the stage and reclaim the yellow jersey from Vos, who lost 33 seconds to the front group. Wiebes and Chabbey maintained their leads in the points and QoM classifications.

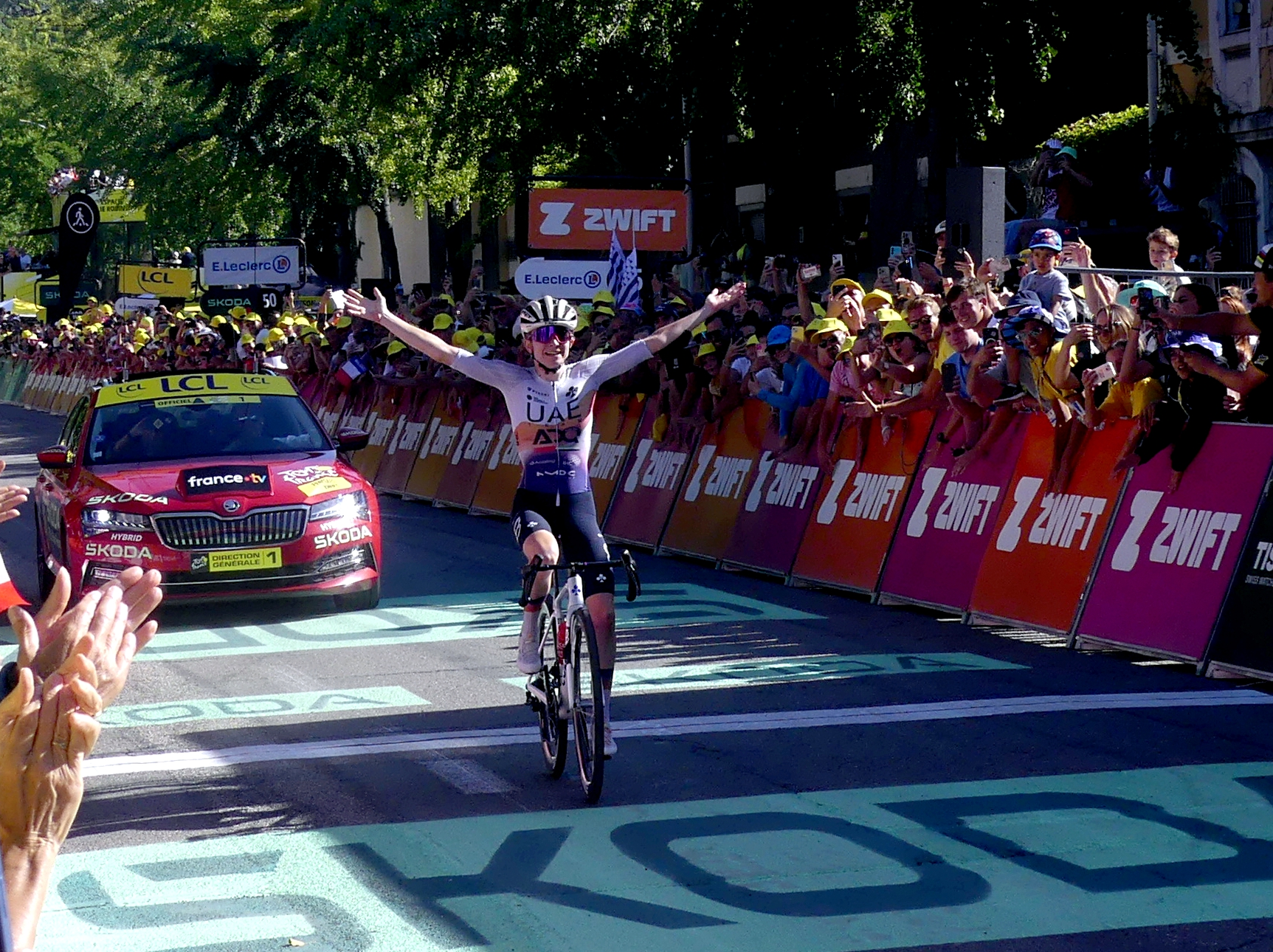
Winner of stages 6 and 7, Maëva Squiban (UAE Team ADQ)

The sixth stage of the race took the riders eastwards to Ambert on a mountainous course in the Massif Central with four categorised climbs. The hardest climb was the first-category Col du Béal (10.2 km with an average gradient of 5.6%). Bonus seconds were available at the top of the uncategorised climb of Valcivières, which topped with 12.1 kilometres (7.5 mi) left. There were 20 riders in the break of the day but they were caught after the descent of the Col du Béal. Midway up the next climb, the Col du Chansert, Maëva Squiban (UAE Team ADQ) went solo off the front. She increased her lead to more than one minute before maintaining her advantage to complete a 32-kilometre (20 mi) solo for the stage. Le Court extended her GC advantage to 26 seconds after taking a total of eight bonus seconds on the stage.

The seventh stage of the race headed further eastwards towards the French Alps on a hilly course. The stage had three categorised climbs (two second-category and one fourth-category), with the second-category climb of Col du Granier (8.9 km with an average gradient of 5.4%) leading to a "fast and technical" descent to the finish in Chambéry. A group of 17 riders went away after the first 20 kilometres (12 mi), with the peloton content to let the break fight for the stage win. On the final climb of Col du Granier, the previous day's stage winner, Squiban, dropped the rest of the break, soloing to a second successive stage win. Meanwhile, in the peloton, Le Court was briefly dropped on Col du Granier but she managed to come back on the descent. Cédrine Kerbaol (EF Education–Oatly) got a gap on the descent, taking second on the stage, while the main GC contenders finished together with the exception of Gigante, Rooijakkers, and Évita Muzic (FDJ–Suez), who lost 11 seconds on the descent. Nienke Vinke (Team Picnic–PostNL) took the lead in the young rider classification, with a 21-second lead over Bego.

=== Mountain stages in the Alps ===
The eighth and ninth stages of the Tour took place in the French Alps, with three first-category and two hors catégorie (English: beyond category) climbs over the two days.

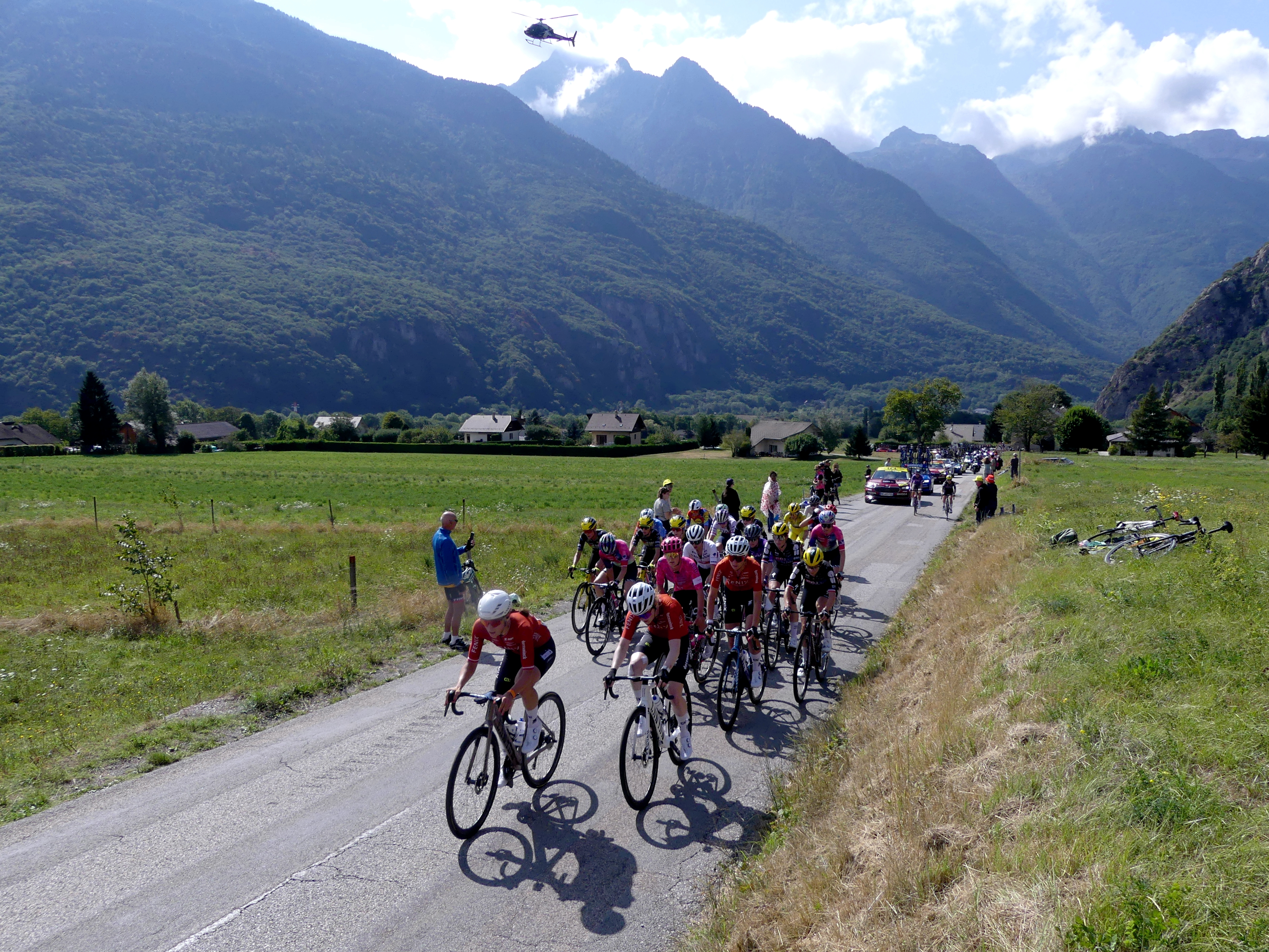
Riders on stage 8 in the French Alps

The eighth stage was the queen stage of the race, a 111.9-kilometre (69.5 mi) route from Chambéry to a summit finish at Col de la Madeleine. The riders tackled three categorised climbs – the first-category Col de Plainpalais, the second-category Côte de Saint-Georges-d'Hurtières, and finally a summit finish at the hors catégorie Col de la Madeleine (18.6 km in length with an average gradient of 8.1%) at an elevation of 2,000 m (6,600 ft). In the middle of the stage, Le Court crashed on a descent. She was quickly able to remount before eventually rejoining the peloton. On the Col de la Madeleine, Niamh Fisher-Black (Lidl–Trek) and Yara Kastelijn (Fenix–Deceuninck) emerged as the strongest from a 15-woman break. In the peloton, Le Court set the pace before Gigante attacked with 11 kilometres (6.8 mi) left. The only rider able to stay with Gigante was Ferrand-Prévot. With 8.3 kilometres (5.2 mi) to go, Ferrand-Prévot made a decisive move to drop Gigante. She passed the remnants of the break, including Fisher-Black and Kastelijn, and extended her advantage all the way to the top, soloing to the stage win and the yellow jersey. Gigante overtook Fisher-Black and Kastelijn to finish second on the stage at almost two minutes down. Behind them, a five-woman group including Vollering, Niewiadoma, Rooijakkers and Kerbaol was formed. Vollering dropped the rest of the group inside the final kilometre, finishing at more than three minutes down on Ferrand-Prévot while the rest of the group finished in dribs and drabs. In the GC, Ferrand-Prévot's advantage over Gigante in second was around two and a half minutes, with Vollering in third around 40 seconds behind Gigante. Wiebes and Chabbey maintained their leads in the points and QoM classifications, while Vinke extended her lead in the young rider classification to nearly nine minutes. Following the stage, Ferrand-Prévot thanked the public and family at the roadside, and stated she'd "realised a little girl's dream, it's a perfect day".

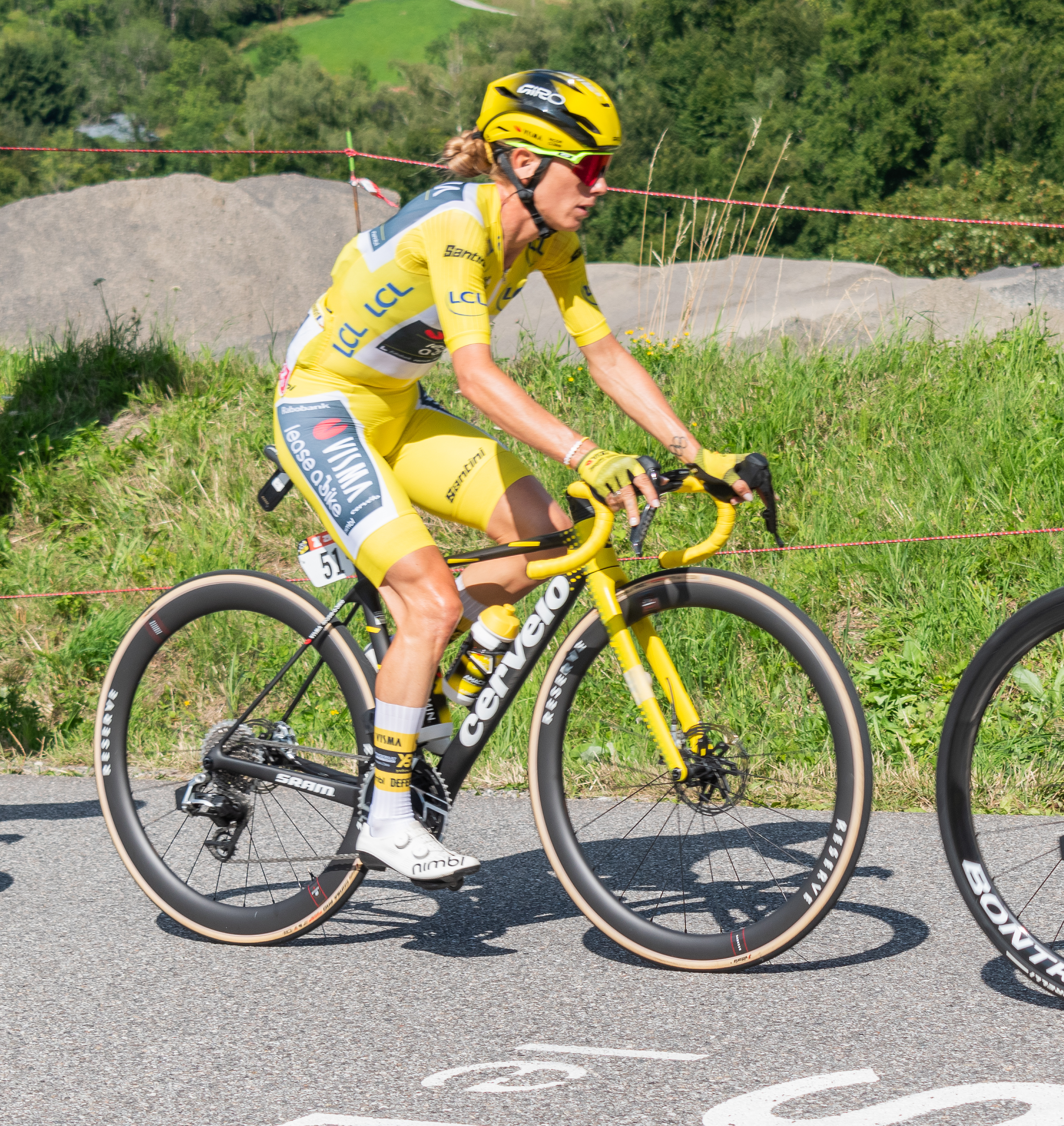
Pauline Ferrand-Prévot in the yellow jersey on stage 9

In the final stage, the riders tackled three categorised climbs – the first-category Côte d'Arâches-la-Frasse (6.2 km with an average gradient of 7.1%), the hors catégorie Col de Joux Plane (11.6 km with an average gradient of 8.5%) at an elevation of 1,691 m (5,548 ft) and the first-category Col du Corbier (5.9 km with an average gradient of 8.5%). After an uphill drag over 20 kilometres (12 mi), the stage finished at the ski resort of Châtel. At the start of the stage, there were splits on the descent which caught out the top two on GC, Ferrand-Prévot and Gigante. After the peloton reformed, van der Breggen went on a solo break on the first climb. At the foot of Col de Joux Plane, Kerbaol and Niewiadoma crashed. While Niewiadoma quickly remounted and rejoined the main GC group, Kerbaol was unable to rejoin and ended up losing more than nine minutes at the end of the day. On the descent of Joux Plane, Gigante was distanced and never rejoined the other contenders, losing almost four minutes to drop out of the top five. After van der Breggen was caught and distanced on the final climb, Ferrand-Prévot attacked with 6.5 kilometres (4.0 mi) to go, dropping the other contenders to solo to a second successive stage win and confirm her Tour victory. With Gigante being distanced, Niewiadoma moved up to third to occupy the last spot on the podium.

=== Results ===
In the final general classification (GC), Pauline Ferrand-Prévot (Visma–Lease a Bike) won the Tour de France Femmes with an advantage over 2023 winner Demi Vollering (FDJ–Suez) of over three and a half minutes. Third overall was defending champion Katarzyna Niewiadoma-Phinney (Canyon//SRAM Zondacrypto). Ferrand-Prévot was the first French winner of the Tour de France Femmes, and the first French win at the Tour de France since Bernard Hinault at the 1985 Tour de France and Jeannie Longo at the 1989 Tour de France Féminin.

In the race's other classifications, Lorena Wiebes (Team SD Worx–Protime) won the green jersey of the points classification. Elise Chabbey (FDJ–Suez) took the polka-dot jersey as winner of the Queen of the Mountains (QoM) classification. Nienke Vinke (Team Picnic–PostNL) took the white jersey as the winner of the young riders classification, which was awarded to the best-placed rider under the age of 23. Maëva Squiban (UAE Team ADQ) took the combativity award, after wins on stages 6 and 7. FDJ–Suez won the team classification as the team with the lowest aggregate time among their three best-placed riders. Out of 154 starters, 124 finished the event.

Pauline Ferrand-Prévot expressed her delight at her victory, stating that she "set the bar really high this year to prepare for this Tour de France" and that she "just wants to enjoy this moment, it may only happen once in my life." She also noted that her weight loss to prepare for the race was "not 100% healthy" but countered that "I didn't do [anything] extreme, and I still had power left after nine days of racing". Vollering expressed her disappointment in the result, stating "I came here for stage wins and the yellow jersey but didn't get either". Niewiadoma-Phinney expressed happiness at finishing third overall, noting the growth in the women's peloton, and that teams and riders were stronger than when she won in 2024. Wiebes noted it was her first Tour "without bad luck", having crashed out in 2022 and illness ending her 2023 Tour. Chabbey thanked Vollering for her efforts to defend the polka-dot jersey, adding that it was "a huge honour to have worn this jersey from start to finish". Vinke stated “it's really special to win [the white jersey], especially in the Tour de France as it's one of the biggest races on the calendar".

== Classification leadership ==
Classification leadership by stage
Stage	Winner	General classification	Points classification	Mountains classification	Young rider classification	Team classification	Combativity award
1	Marianne Vos	Marianne Vos	Marianne Vos (Note: On stage 2, Demi Vollering, who was third in the points classification, wore the green jersey, because first placed Marianne Vos wore the yellow jersey as the leader of the general classification and second placed Kimberley Le Court was obligated to wear the Mauritian national champion's jersey.)	Elise Chabbey	Julie Bego	FDJ–Suez	Franziska Koch
2	Mavi García	Kimberley Le Court	Marianne Vos	Elise Chabbey	Julie Bego	FDJ–Suez	Maëva Squiban
3	Lorena Wiebes	Marianne Vos	Lorena Wiebes	Elise Chabbey	Julie Bego	FDJ–Suez	Clémence Latimier
4	Lorena Wiebes	Marianne Vos	Lorena Wiebes	Elise Chabbey	Julie Bego	FDJ–Suez	Franziska Koch
5	Kimberley Le Court	Kimberley Le Court	Lorena Wiebes	Elise Chabbey	Julie Bego	FDJ–Suez	Brodie Chapman
6	Maëva Squiban	Kimberley Le Court	Lorena Wiebes	Elise Chabbey	Julie Bego	FDJ–Suez	Maëva Squiban
7	Maëva Squiban	Kimberley Le Court	Lorena Wiebes	Elise Chabbey	Nienke Vinke	FDJ–Suez	Maëva Squiban
8	Pauline Ferrand-Prévot	Pauline Ferrand-Prévot	Lorena Wiebes	Elise Chabbey	Nienke Vinke	FDJ–Suez	Niamh Fisher-Black
9	Pauline Ferrand-Prévot	Pauline Ferrand-Prévot	Lorena Wiebes	Elise Chabbey	Nienke Vinke	FDJ–Suez	Anna van der Breggen
Final		Pauline Ferrand-Prévot	Lorena Wiebes	Elise Chabbey	Nienke Vinke	FDJ–Suez	Maëva Squiban

== Classification standings ==
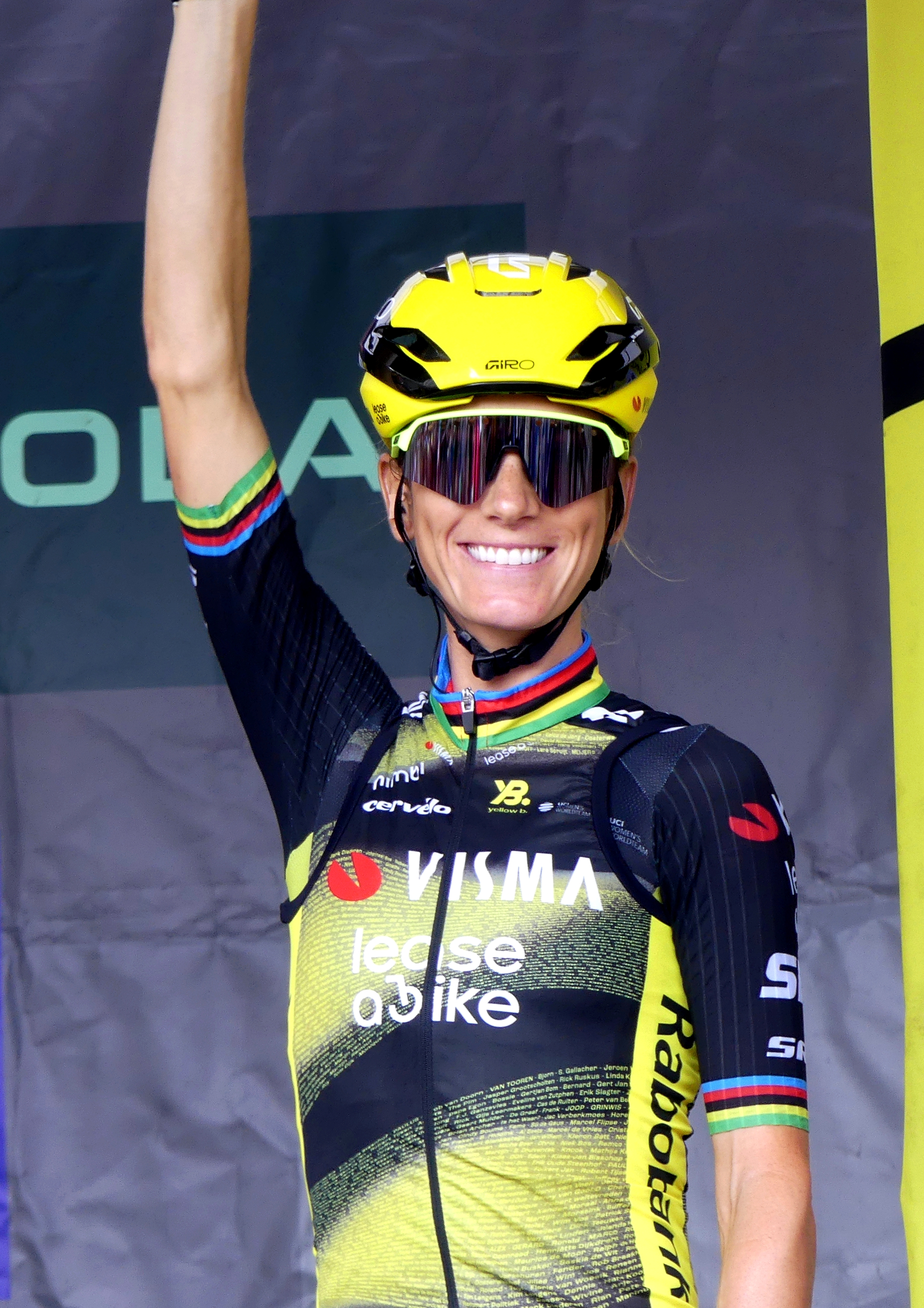
Winner of the general classification, Pauline Ferrand-Prévot (pictured on stage 8)

Legend
Denotes the winner of the general classification	Denotes the winner of the mountains classification
Denotes the winner of the points classification	Denotes the winner of the young rider classification
Denotes the winner of the team classification	Denotes the winner of the combativity award

=== General classification ===
Final general classification (1–10)
Rank	Rider	Team	Time
1	Pauline Ferrand-Prévot (FRA)	Visma–Lease a Bike	29h 54' 24"
2	Demi Vollering (NED)	FDJ–Suez	+ 3' 42"
3	Katarzyna Niewiadoma-Phinney (POL)	Canyon//SRAM Zondacrypto	+ 4' 09"
4	Dominika Włodarczyk (POL)	UAE Team ADQ	+ 5' 45"
5	Niamh Fisher-Black (NZL)	Lidl–Trek	+ 6' 25"
6	Sarah Gigante (AUS)	AG Insurance–Soudal	+ 6' 40"
7	Juliette Labous (FRA)	FDJ–Suez	+ 9' 13"
8	Cédrine Kerbaol (FRA)	EF Education–Oatly	+ 13' 43"
9	Pauliena Rooijakkers (NED)	Fenix–Deceuninck	+ 13' 59"
10	Évita Muzic (FRA)	FDJ–Suez	+ 15' 50"

=== Points classification ===
Final points classification after (1–10)
Rank	Rider	Team	Points
1	Lorena Wiebes (NED)	Team SD Worx–Protime	230
2	Marianne Vos (NED)	Visma–Lease a Bike	178
3	Demi Vollering (NED)	FDJ–Suez	147
4	Kimberley Le Court (MRI)	AG Insurance–Soudal	133
5	Anna van der Breggen (NED)	Team SD Worx–Protime	118
6	Pauline Ferrand-Prévot (FRA)	Visma–Lease a Bike	114
7	Katarzyna Niewiadoma-Phinney (POL)	Canyon//SRAM Zondacrypto	110
8	Franziska Koch (GER)	Team Picnic–PostNL	97
9	Maëva Squiban (FRA)	UAE Team ADQ	72
10	Elise Chabbey (SUI)	FDJ–Suez	72

=== Mountains classification ===
Final mountains classification (1–10)
Rank	Rider	Team	Points
1	Elise Chabbey (SUI)	FDJ–Suez	44
2	Demi Vollering (NED)	FDJ–Suez	36
3	Maëva Squiban (FRA)	UAE Team ADQ	36
4	Pauline Ferrand-Prévot (FRA)	Visma–Lease a Bike	33
5	Anna van der Breggen (NED)	Team SD Worx–Protime	29
6	Katarzyna Niewiadoma-Phinney (POL)	Canyon//SRAM Zondacrypto	19
7	Niamh Fisher-Black (NZL)	Lidl–Trek	19
8	Sarah Gigante (AUS)	AG Insurance–Soudal	18
9	Silke Smulders (NED)	Liv AlUla Jayco	17
10	Yara Kastelijn (NED)	Fenix–Deceuninck	12

=== Young rider classification ===
Final young rider classification (1–10)
Rank	Rider	Team	Time
1	Nienke Vinke (NED)	Team Picnic–PostNL	30h 31' 41"
2	Titia Ryo (FRA)	Arkéa–B&B Hotels Women	+ 14' 51"
3	Julie Bego (FRA)	Cofidis	+ 19' 16"
4	Marion Bunel (FRA)	Visma–Lease a Bike	+ 29' 11"
5	Francesca Barale (ITA)	Team Picnic–PostNL	+ 50' 03"
6	Clémence Latimier (FRA)	Arkéa–B&B Hotels Women	+ 1h 06' 21"
7	Millie Couzens (GBR)	Fenix–Deceuninck	+ 1h 32' 07"
8	Imogen Wolff (GBR)	Visma–Lease a Bike	+ 1h 34' 10"
9	Kiara Lylyk (CAN)	Winspace Orange Seal	+ 1h 53' 40"
10	Flora Perkins (GBR)	Fenix–Deceuninck	+ 2h 04' 59"

=== Team classification ===
Final team classification (1–10)
Rank	Team	Time
1	(France) FDJ–Suez	90h 12' 03"
2	(Belgium) AG Insurance–Soudal	+ 35' 53"
3	(Netherlands) Visma–Lease a Bike	+ 43' 44"
4	(Germany) Canyon//SRAM Zondacrypto	+ 54' 19"
5	(United States) Lidl–Trek	+ 56' 18"
6	(Belgium) Fenix–Deceuninck	+ 1h 07' 54"
7	(United Arab Emirates) UAE Team ADQ	+ 1h 43' 07"
8	(Australia) Liv AlUla Jayco	+ 1h 47' 29"
9	(United States) EF Education–Oatly	+ 1h 53' 30"
10	(United States) Human Powered Health	+ 2h 01' 42"

== Reception ==
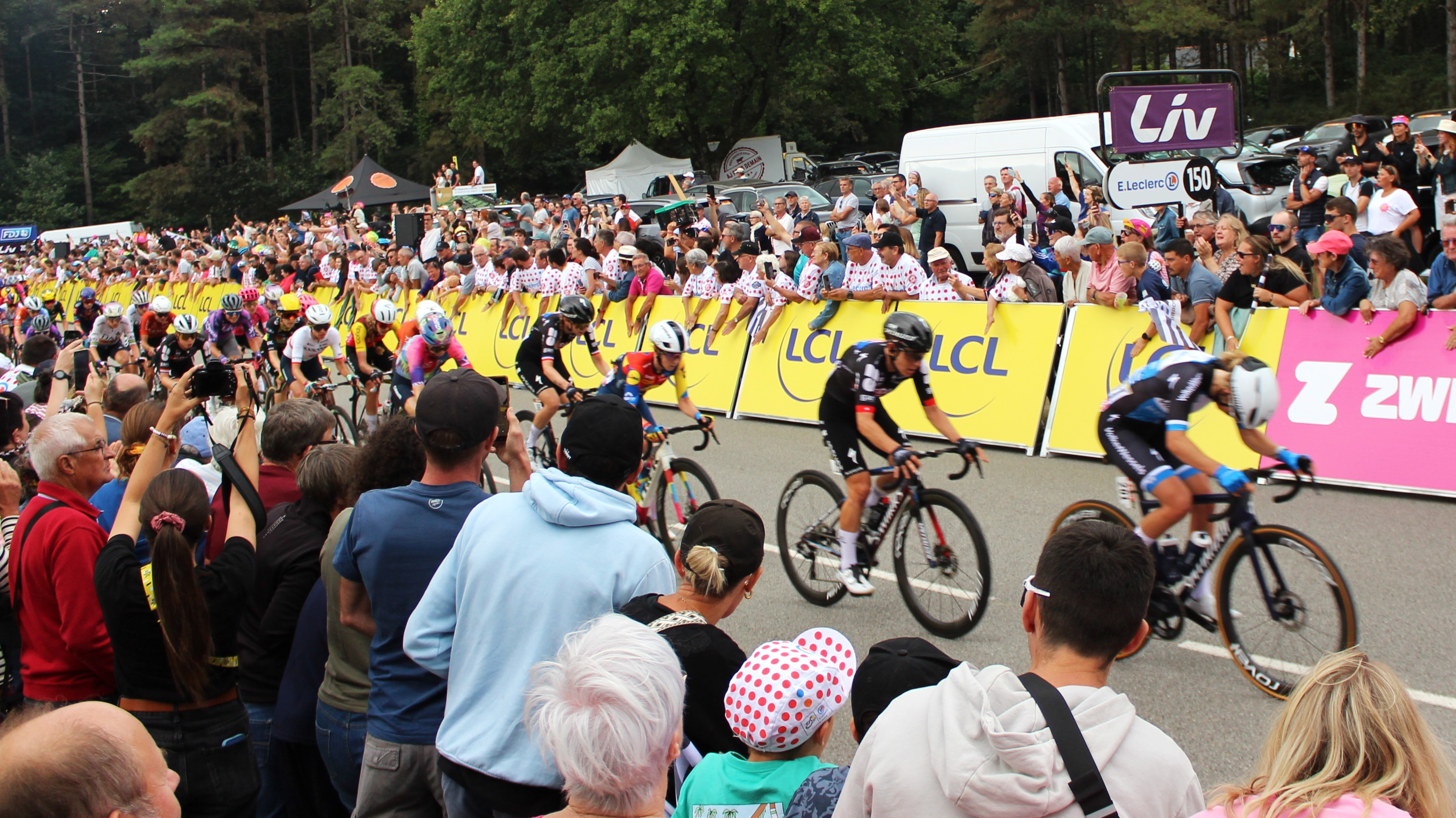
Large enthusiastic crowds greeted the race in Brittany

Media praised the race, with Cycling Weekly calling the race "best and most successful yet", and The Guardian noted that no previous women's races "compare with the significance and scale of the modern Tour de France Femmes".

There was specific praise for Pauline Ferrand-Prévot, with Le Figaro calling her a "Tour de France legend", L'Équipe stated that her victory had led to "unprecedented enthusiasm in women's cycling" and The Guardian noted that she was a French national icon. Her victory was widely welcomed, including by French president Emmanuel Macron, Jeannie Longo (winner of the 1989 Tour de France Féminin) and Bernard Hinault (winner of the 1985 Tour de France).

Media noted the consistency of Vollering and Niewiadoma-Phinney, with both riders having finished on the podium in all four editions of the race. There was praise for the climbing ability of Sarah Gigante, two-time stage winner Maeva Squiban, and French interest in the race with record numbers of television viewers. Media and riders also praised the large enthusiastic crowds in Brittany, which hosted the Grand Départ in Brittany. Race director Marion Rousse stated that "all records have been broken in this fourth edition" and that "we have been adopted by the general public". Christian Prudhomme, race director of the men's tour told Rousse that he "no longer [sees] any difference between the two Tours de France”.

There was disappointment regarding withdrawals of several key contenders including Marlen Reusser, Elisa Longo Borghini and Kristen Faulkner. FDJ–Suez were criticised, with media noting that they "failed to convert [their] numerical superiority" during the race. There was also criticism of the lack of spectators on the Col de la Madeleine, however this was due to traffic restrictions following the L'Étape du Tour cyclosportive held earlier in the day. Cycling Weekly also argued for more television coverage of the race. Jeannie Longo, the winner of the 1989 Tour de France Féminin stated that she felt forgotten by the public, after some media outlets reported Ferrand-Prévot's victory as the first since Bernard Hinault at the 1985 Tour de France.

== Broadcasting ==
As with previous editions, live television coverage was provided by France Télévisions in conjunction with the European Broadcasting Union. At least two and a half hours of each stage were broadcast live, with stages 1, 8 and 9 shown from start to finish.

In France, France 2 reported that 4.4 million viewers watched the final stage to Châtel, with a peak of 7.7 million viewers watching Pauline Ferrand-Prévot's victory – a record number for the Tour de France Femmes. An average of 2.7 million viewers watched the race during the week, around 500,000 more than the 2024 edition. Cycling News noted that the audience share for the final stage was similar to the final stage of the men's Tour, and that French viewing figures were much higher than the women's final of the French Open tennis tournament. In Belgium, around 540,000 viewers watched the stage to Col de la Madeleine on VRT, around 150,000 more than 2024. In the Netherlands, NOS reported that the first five stages averaged 500,000 viewers.
