= Denis Clavel =

French poet and politician (1942–2024)

Mayor of Arâches-la-Frasse
- In office 1971–1983
- Succeeded by: Michel Pépin

Personal details
- Born: 22 June 1942 Annecy, France
- Died: 24 March 2024 (aged 81) Cluses, France
- Occupation: Poet

Denis Clavel (22 June 1942 – 24 March 2024) was a French poet and politician. He published approximately 20 collections of poetry from 1963 to 2020.

== Biography ==
Born in Annecy on 22 June 1942, Clavel met Jean Lurçat in 1963, during his first publication of poetry at the Château d'Annecy. Lurçat entrusted him with the creation of a poetic commentary of his art, the tapestry Chant du monde. His following collections were primarily edited by Guy Chambelland and he maintained significant correspondence with Pierre Emmanuel and Georges Haldas. In 1992, Haldas dedicated a poem to him in the collection La Blessure essentielle. During his career, Clavel received praise from Robert Sabatier. He also served as Mayor of Arâches-la-Frasse from 1971 to 1983.

Denis Clavel died in Cluses on 24 March 2024, at the age of 81.

== Publications ==
- Fenêtre sur la mer (1963)
- Le Chant du monde (1963)
- Le Goût du feu et Journal d'un pharisien (1969)
- La Genèse du poème (1972)
- Opéra sur la vitre (1972)
- Paysage clandestin (1976)
- Distance apprivoisée (1978)
- Les Regards contagieux (1981)
- La Ténèbre (1983)
- Lazare (1984)
- Le Chant de la créature (1988)
- Le Poème (1990)
- Métier d'homme (1990)
- Porte d'âge (1992)
- La Fin du temps (1994)
- La Théorie de Delphes (2002)
- Je ne vois aucune différence de principe entre un poème et une poignée de main (2007)
- Le Livre du repos (2009)
- Le Jardin de Talèfre (2011)
- Infinition de l'heure (2018)
- Le temps ordinaire (2020)
