= Lac de Flaine =

- Location within France
- Location: Flaine, Haute-Savoie
- Coordinates: 46°0′5″N 6°40′22″E
- Primary outflows: subterranean
- Basin countries: France
- Surface area: 12 ha (30 acres)
- Max. depth: 10.5 m (34 ft)
- Surface elevation: 1,417 m (4,649 ft)

Lac de Flaine (French pronunciation: [lak də flɛn]) is a lake at Flaine in Haute-Savoie, France. Its surface and depth vary seasonly. Maximum depth can reach 10.5 m in May and only 0.75 m in winter, while the surface area varies from 12 ha to 1.5 ha.
