= Morillon, Haute-Savoie =

Morillon Morlyan (Savoyard)
- Commune
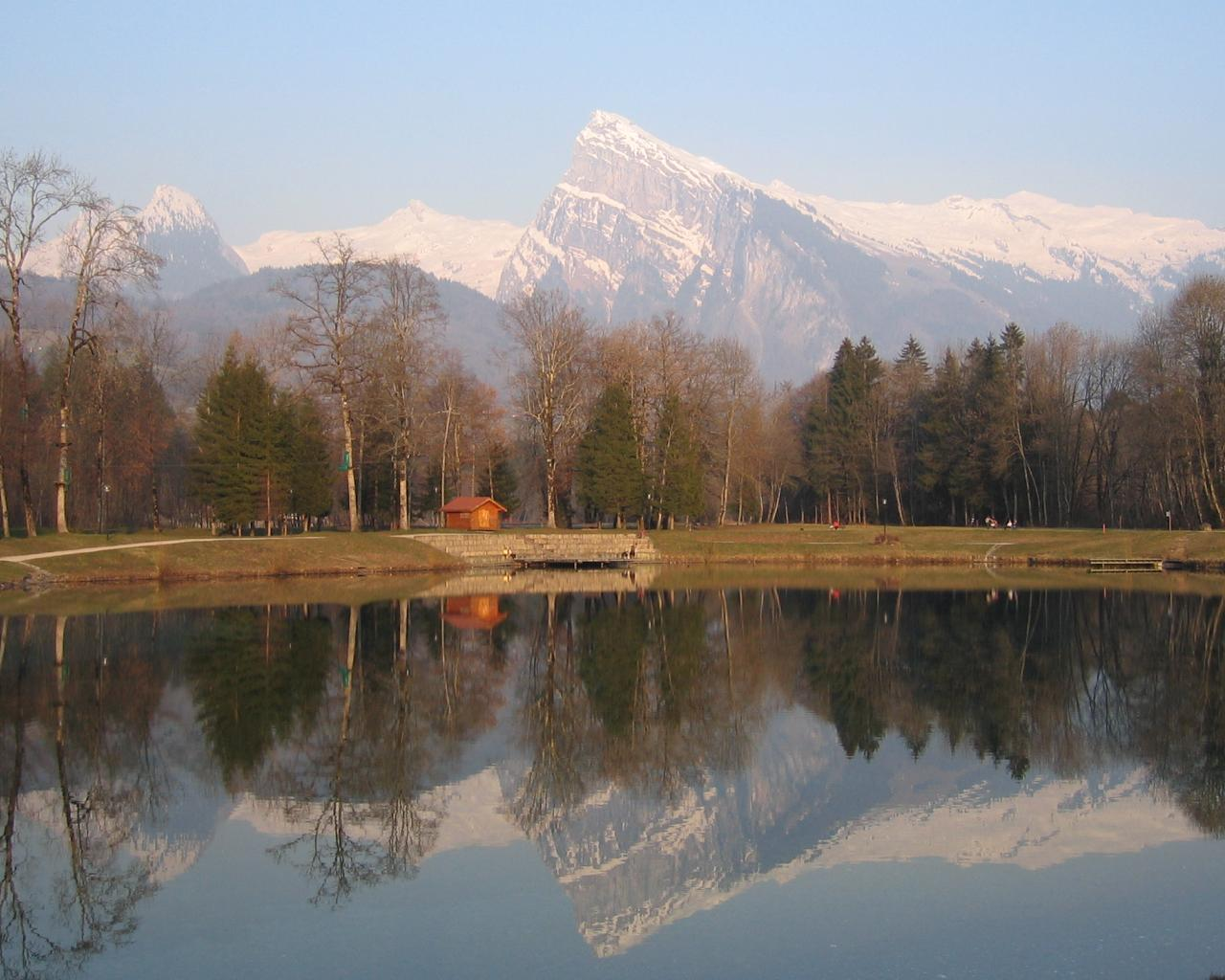
- The "Blue Lake" in Morillon

- Coat of arms
- Location of Morillon
- Location within France Location within Auvergne-Rhône-Alpes
- Coordinates: 46°05′05″N 6°40′34″E
- Country: France
- Region: Auvergne-Rhône-Alpes
- Department: Haute-Savoie
- Arrondissement: Bonneville
- Canton: Cluses

Government
  - Mayor (2020–2026): Simon Beerens-Bettex
- Area^{1}: 14.51 km^{2} (5.60 sq mi)
- Elevation: 900 m (3,000 ft)
- Highest elevation: 2,046 m (6,713 ft)
- Lowest elevation: 657 m (2,156 ft)
- Population (2023): 719
  - Density: 49.6/km^{2} (128/sq mi)
- Time zone: UTC+01:00 (CET)
  - Summer (DST): UTC+02:00 (CEST)
- INSEE/Postal code: 74190 /74440
- ^{1} French Land Register data, which excludes lakes, ponds, glaciers > 1 km^{2} (0.386 sq mi or 247 acres) and river estuaries.

Morillon (French pronunciation: [mɔʁijɔ̃]; Savoyard: Morlyan) is a commune in the Haute-Savoie department in the Auvergne-Rhône-Alpes region in south-eastern France.

It is a popular summer and winter vacation destination. Morillon is family-oriented and holds the Famille Plus Montagne label for its facilities.

== Ski ==
Morillon has a Poma télécabine that departs from just outside the village and links up to the Grand Massif ski area consisting of 265 km of ski runs over the five resorts of Morillon, Samoëns, Flaine, Les Carroz, and Sixt. Morillon is also the home ski area of the 2006 Winter Olympic's Downhill Gold Medalist Antoine Dénériaz. Above the village at Morillon 1100, also known as Les Esserts, there are many apartments benefiting from ski-in ski-out holiday options.

The Grand Massif ski area consists of 145 slopes: 18 green runs, 67 blue runs, 46 red runs and 14 black runs.

== Climate ==
Climate data for Morillon
Month	Jan	Feb	Mar	Apr	May	Jun	Jul	Aug	Sep	Oct	Nov	Dec	Year
Mean daily maximum °C (°F)	3 (37)	6 (43)	10 (50)	15 (59)	18 (64)	23 (73)	25 (77)	24 (75)	21 (70)	14 (57)	8 (46)	4 (39)	15 (59)
Mean daily minimum °C (°F)	−2 (28)	−1 (30)	2 (36)	6 (43)	9 (48)	13 (55)	14 (57)	14 (57)	12 (54)	7 (45)	3 (37)	−1 (30)	7 (45)
Source: Accuweather 2014

== Miscellaneous ==
Morillon also has a small lake which is surrounded by numerous activities including an adventure park for adults and children ages 3+. Other sports include trampolining, volleyball and horse riding. White water rafting on the River Giffre, mountain biking, Canyoning, quad biking and tennis are available. Morillon and Samoëns are close together in the valley and share many activities.

Pinot noir from this region is commonly bottled under the Morillon label.

== See also ==
- Communes of the Haute-Savoie department
