= Gabriel Cognacq =

French businessman (1880–1951)

Gabriel Victor René Cognacq (9 October 1880, Paris – 7 June 1951, Seraincourt) was a French department store owner, art collector, and philanthropist.

== Biography ==
He was born into a modest family of commercial employees. After completing his basic education at the Collège Stanislas, he attended the École des Hautes Études Commerciales where, in 1904, he was awarded a Doctor of Law degree. Since 1902, he had been employed at La Samaritaine, a department store that was founded in 1869 by Ernest Cognacq and his wife Marie-Louise Jaÿ; Gabriel's great-uncle and aunt. As they were childless, they adopted Gabriel and made him their sole heir. In 1911, he married Jeanne Voelckel. They had one son; Philippe (1914–2012).

From 1914 to 1918, he served in World War I. While he was gone, in 1916, Ernest and Marie-Louise created the Fondation Cognacq-Jay, a charitable organization that supports retirement homes, hospitals and schools. Following Ernest's death in 1928, Gabriel took over management of La Samaritaine and the Fondation.

Ernest and Marie-Louise had also amassed an important art collection. Much of it passed to the City of Paris. Since 1929 the collection, consisting mainly of 18th-century arts and crafts, has been on display at the Musée Cognacq-Jay. More recent works, and the Asian handicrafts, were inherited by Gabriel. He soon made additions to the collection; including a large number of prints. During the 1930s, he supported other museums; purchasing property for the proposed Musée Bourdelle, and serving as President of the Musée Rodin. In 1938, he was elected to the Académie des Beaux-Arts, where he took Seat #6 in the "Unattached" section. He was also a member of numerous art societies, and was elected President of the Conseil des Musées Nationaux.

During the Spanish Civil War, he helped the Museo del Prado transport its collection to Geneva. In 1939, after the French declaration of war on Germany, he made the delivery vans at La Samaritaine available to the Louvre, to transport their collection to the relative safety of the Château de Chambord. He continued to support charitable causes throughout the war. In 1941, he was made a member of the National Council of Vichy France. When the Vichy government fell, he was accused of being a collaborator. The resulting public hostility led him to auction off his art collection, rather than donate it to the Louvre, as originally planned. The proceeds went to benefit the Fondation.

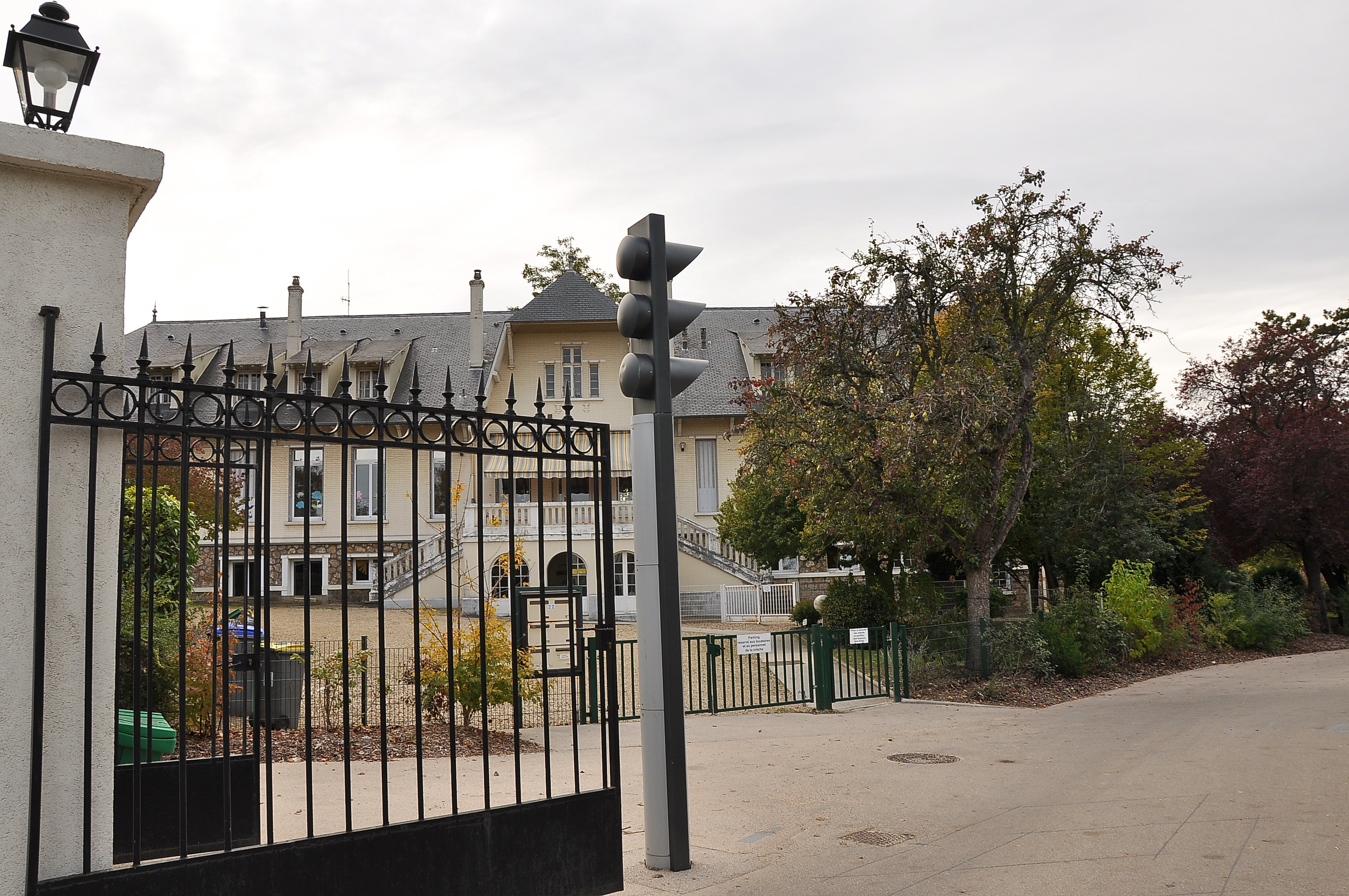
Headquarters of the Fondation Cognacq-Jay
