= Arâches-la-Frasse =

- Commune
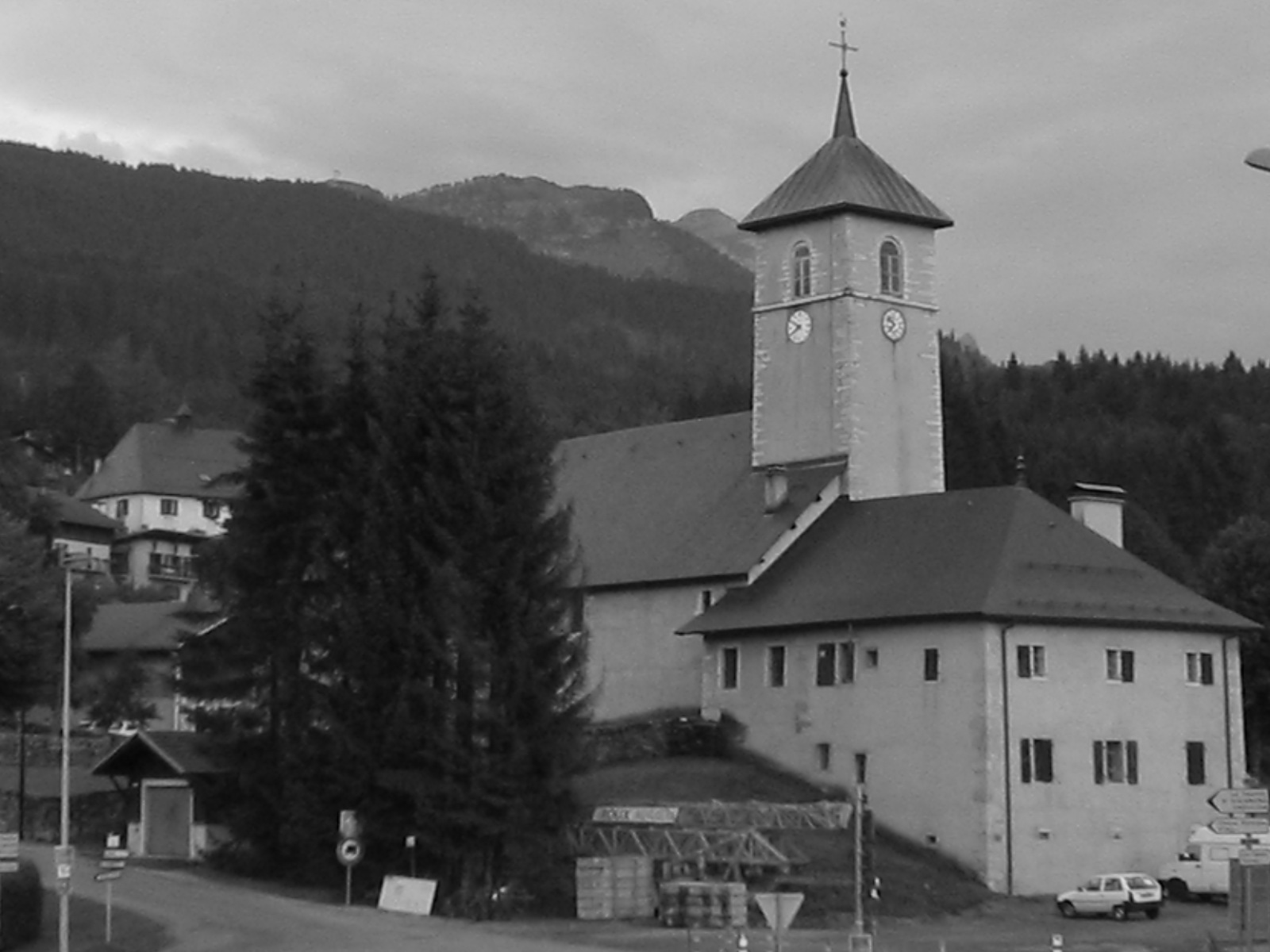
- The church in Arâches-la-Frasse

- Coat of arms
- Location of Arâches-la-Frasse
- Location within France Location within Auvergne-Rhône-Alpes
- Coordinates: 46°02′39″N 6°37′56″E
- Country: France
- Region: Auvergne-Rhône-Alpes
- Department: Haute-Savoie
- Arrondissement: Bonneville
- Canton: Sallanches

Government
  - Mayor (2023–2026): Alexandra Fourgeaud
- Area^{1}: 37.69 km^{2} (14.55 sq mi)
- Highest elevation: 2,466 m (8,091 ft)
- Lowest elevation: 560 m (1,840 ft)
- Population (2023): 1,764
  - Density: 46.80/km^{2} (121.2/sq mi)
- Time zone: UTC+01:00 (CET)
  - Summer (DST): UTC+02:00 (CEST)
- INSEE/Postal code: 74014 /74300
- ^{1} French Land Register data, which excludes lakes, ponds, glaciers > 1 km^{2} (0.386 sq mi or 247 acres) and river estuaries.

Arâches-la-Frasse (French pronunciation: [aʁaʃ la fʁas]) is commune in the Haute-Savoie department in the Auvergne-Rhône-Alpes region in south-eastern France.

Situated in the northern French Alps, the commune sits on a large sunny plateau overlooking the Arve Valley southeast of the town of Cluses.

It is part of the canton of Sallanches. The main villages in the commune are Arâches, Les Carroz, and La Frasse.

== Les Carroz ==
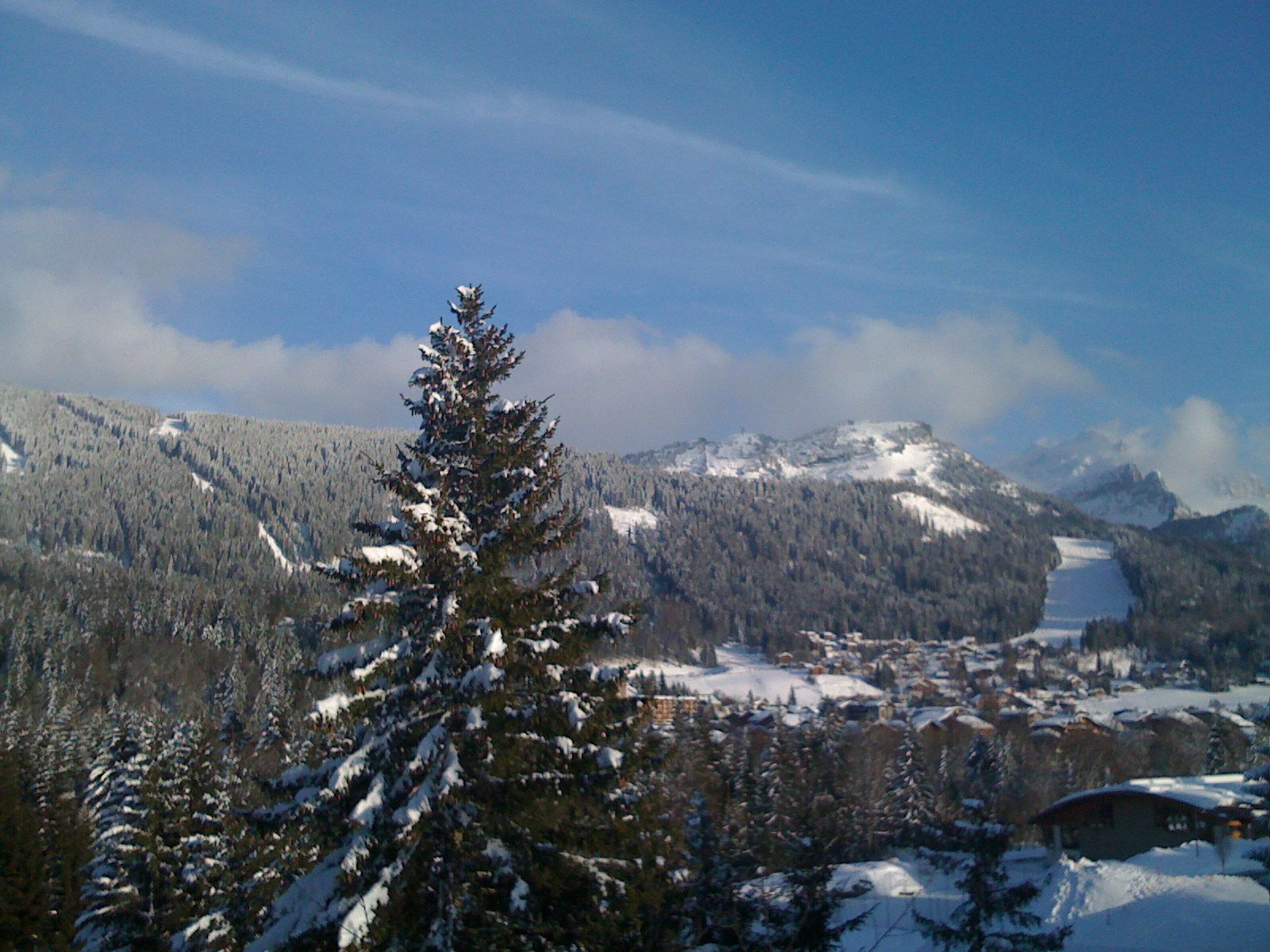
Les Carroz seen from the Pré du Bois

Until the 1930s the village of Les Carroz was a simple farming hamlet with only a few houses. It is now developing into the nearest large ski resort to Geneva. By 1981 Les Carroz had been linked to the nearby ski villages of Samoëns, Morillon and Sixt-Fer-à-Cheval, and the resort of Flaine, developed in the 1960s. The Grand-Massif ski area had been born. The gondola and chairlift in Les Carroz can take skiers straight up to the extensive skiing in the Grand Massif.

== Gallery ==
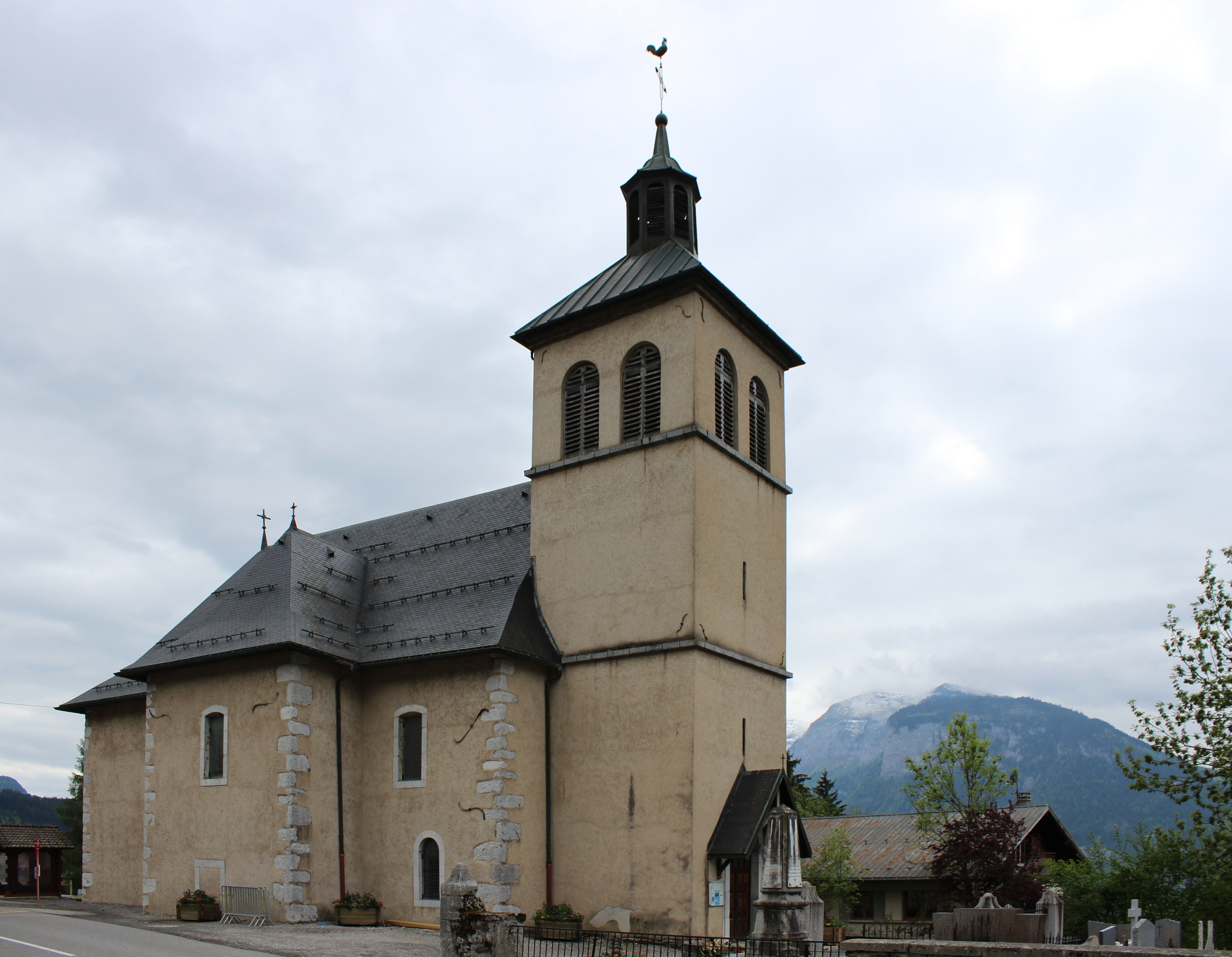
Church

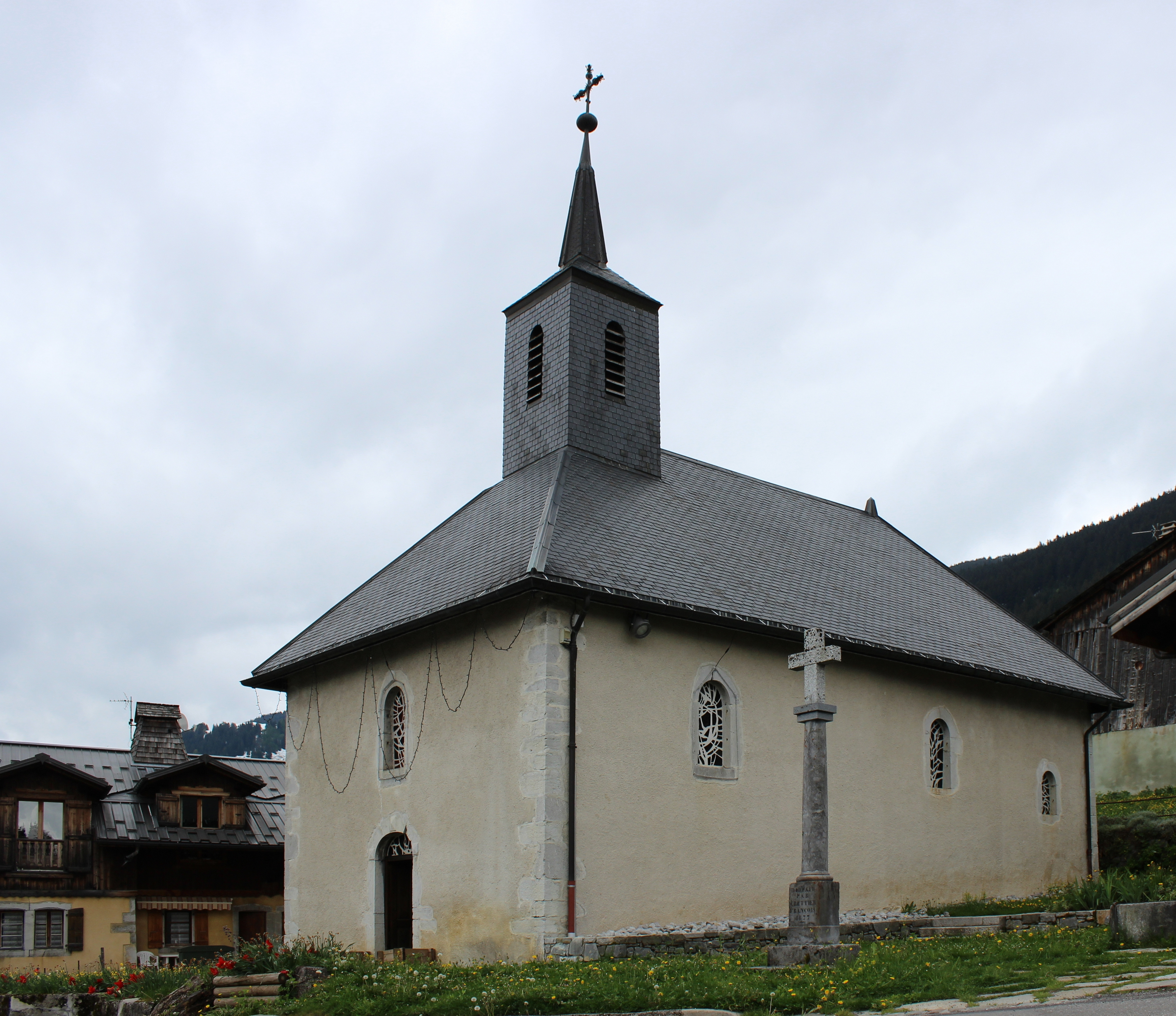
Chapel

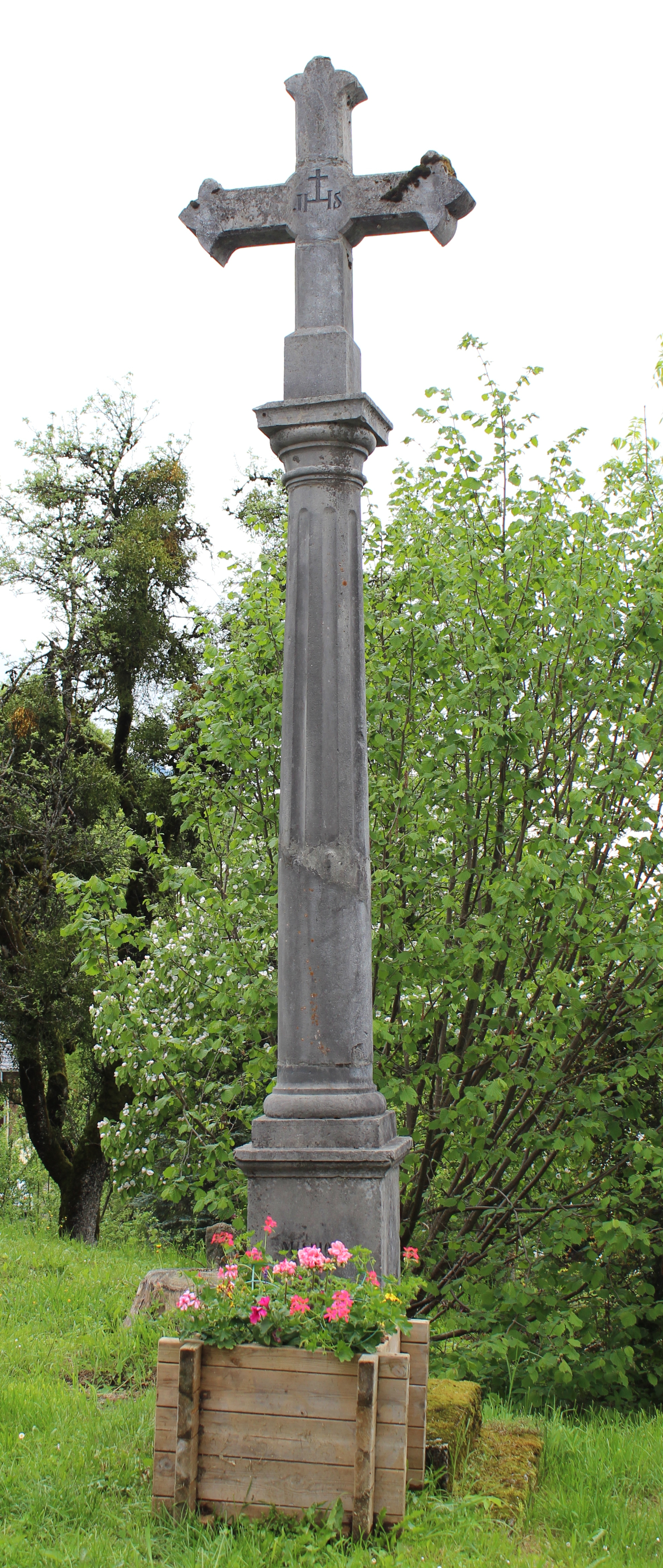
Mission cross

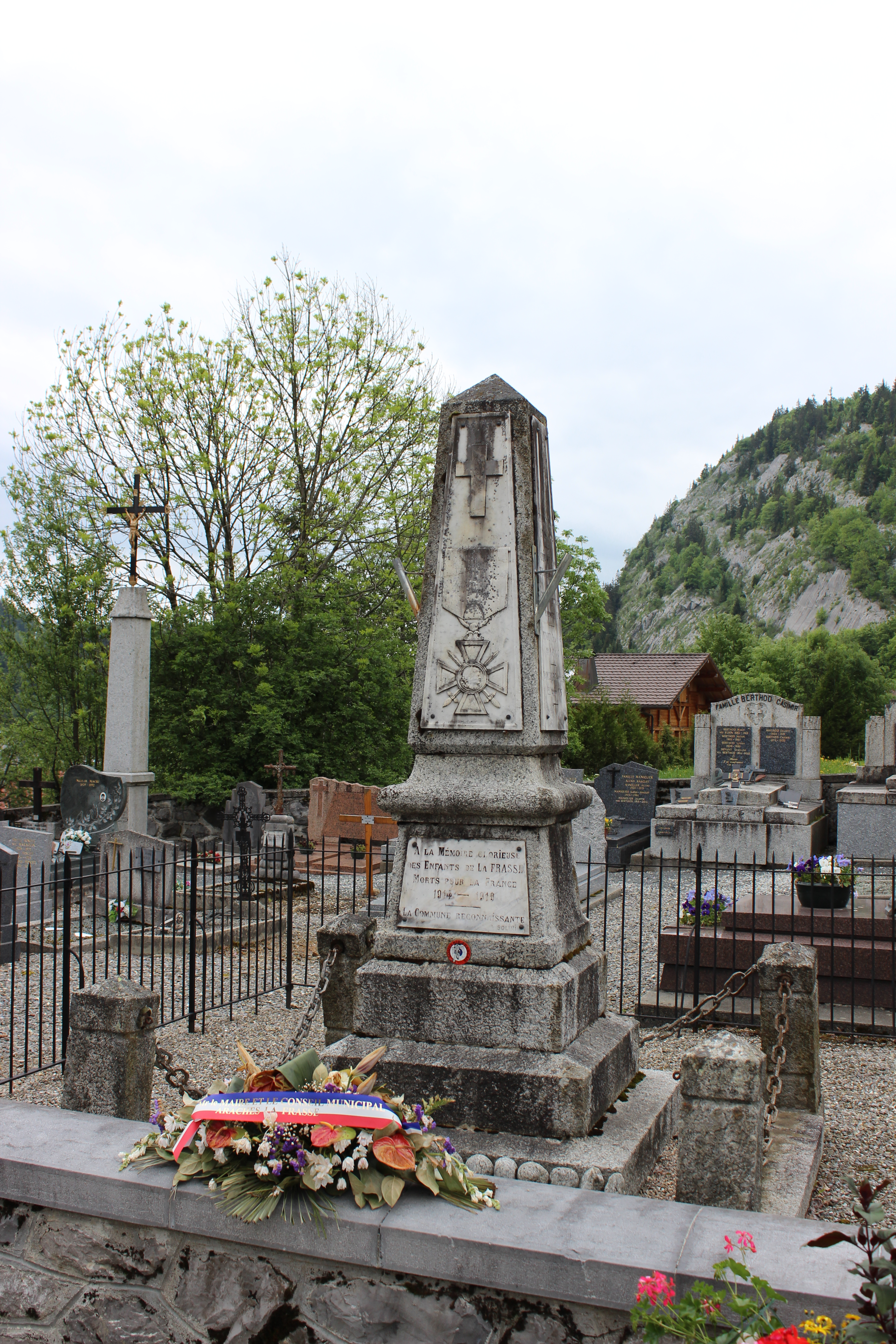
War memorial

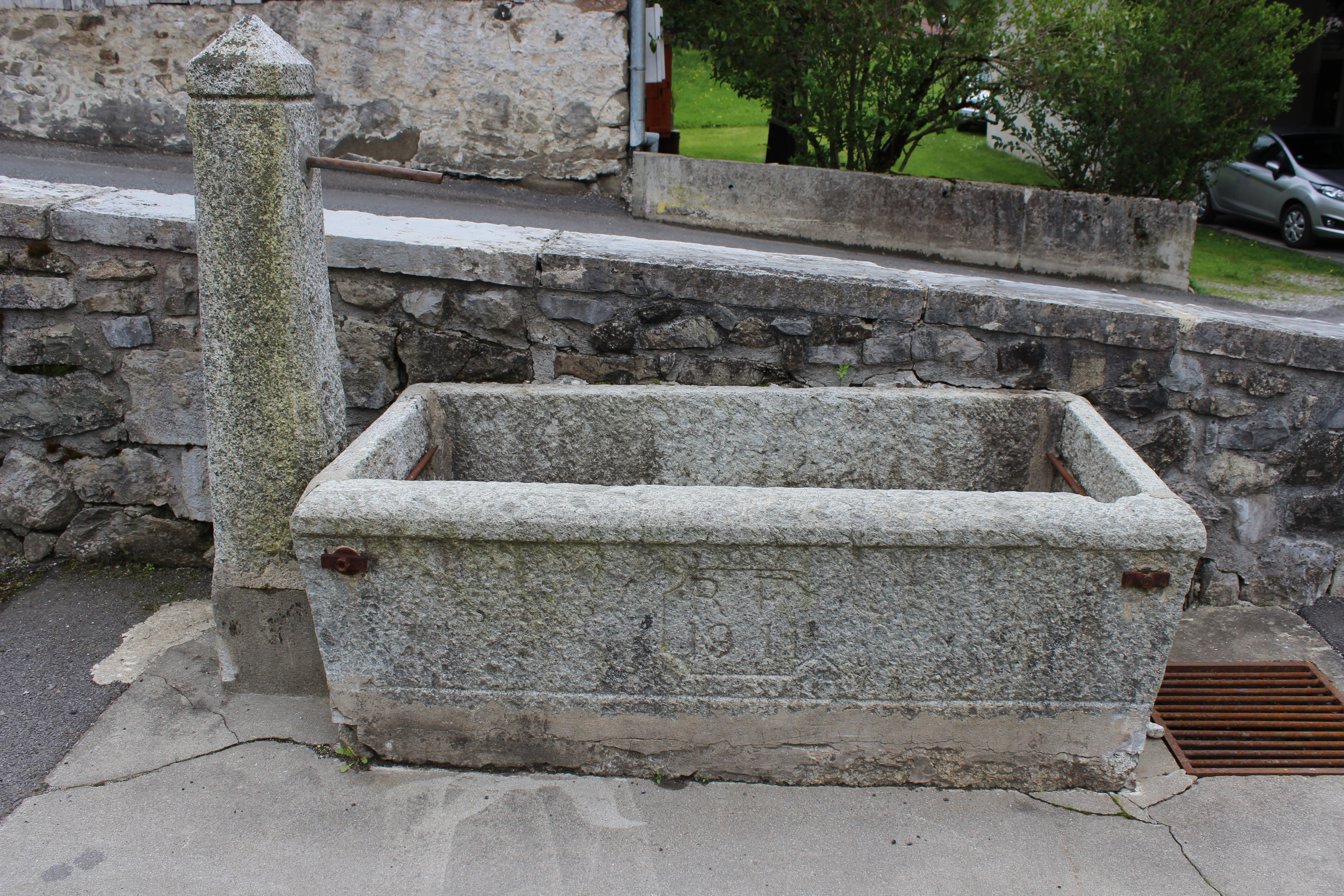
Fountain

== See also ==
- Communes of the Haute-Savoie department
