= Jaÿsinia =

Botanical garden in Rhône-Alpes, France

Jaÿsinia Alpine Botanical Garden
- Samoëns Botanical Garden
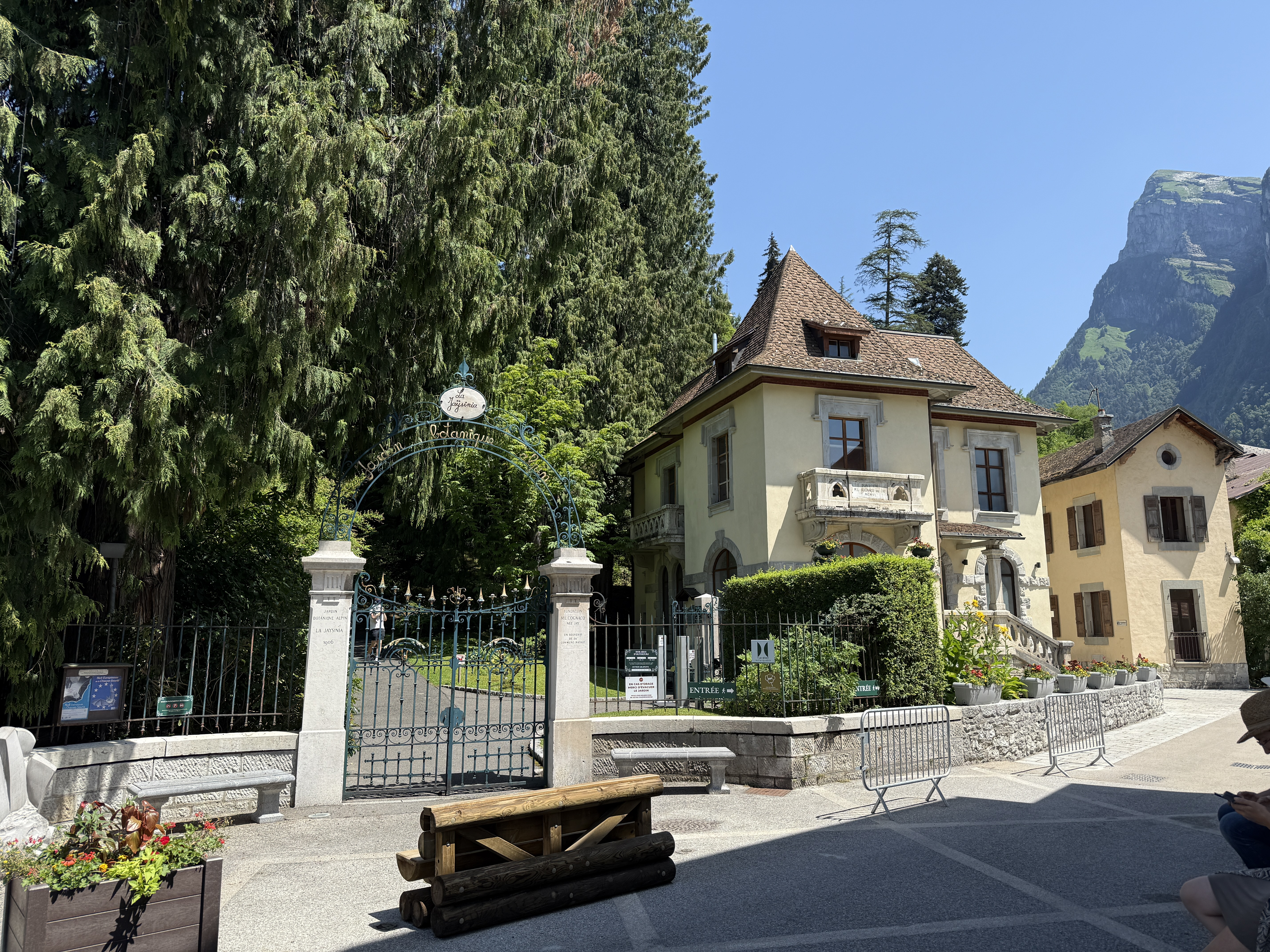
- The entrance to Jardin botanique alpin La Jaÿsinia
- Interactive map of Jaÿsinia Alpine Botanical Garden
- Nearest town: Samoëns
- Coordinates: 46.0850°N 6.7265°E
- Area: 3.7 hectares (9.1 acres)
- Elevation: 700 metres (2,300 ft) to 800 metres (2,600 ft)
- Established: 1905
- Opened: 1906
- Founder: Marie-Louise Cognacq-Jaÿ
- Designer: Louis-Jules Allemand
- Owner: Municipality of Samoëns
- Habitats: Alpine
- Designation: Monument historique

Jaÿsinia 3.7 hectares (9.1 acres) is a botanical garden specializing in alpine flowers, located in Samoëns, Haute-Savoie, Rhône-Alpes, France. It is open daily except when there is snow on the ground; admission is free.

== History ==
The garden was established in 1905 by Marie-Louise Cognac-Jaÿ, a native of Samoëns and founder of La Samaritaine department store in Paris. It was likely an attempt to improve tourism in the area. Other factors also played a role: the 19th-century vogue for such gardens in the Alps; Marie-Louise’s desire to enhance her native village; the local tradition in the Haut-Giffre region of protecting plants from indiscriminate picking; and the impression she took away from visiting the Swiss Village at the Exposition Universelle in 1900.

To transform the wild, uncultivated hillside into a botanical garden she turned to landscape architect Louis-Jules Allemand, a co-creator of the Swiss Village at the 1900 exhibition.

The work carried out over more than two years on this three-hectare site was commensurate with that ambition. The land was divided into 25 plots, each representing a different type of mountain environment from around the world. Some 50,000 plants—including trees, shrubs, conifers, perennials, and annuals—were cultivated there. Fountains, waterfalls, and ponds were fed by a 300,000 litres (300 m^{3}) reservoir supplied by groundwater capture, while the Clevieux torrent and springs from the Allamands Valley provided water for irrigation. Shaping the garden and constructing the walking paths and the access road to the summit required excavating 8,000 cubic meters of stone and using 3 tons of dynamite; remarkably, there were no serious accidents among the workforce, which numbered up to 300 French and Italian workers at the height of construction. It opened to the public in 1906.

The deed of gift provided for the transfer of a government security yielding an annual income of 4,000 francs, intended specifically to remunerate Allemand for managing La Jaysinia, as well as to pay a gardener and an assistant. However, the staff proved insufficient to maintain such a vast and diverse array of plants, and Allemand himself was unable to fulfill his obligations. Despite several additional donations and a change in management, the ensuing years confirmed that the resources required to maintain such a site had been underestimated. The war years inevitably exacerbated the labour shortage, and when Marie-Louise visited Samoëns in late 1918, she found the botanical garden in a deplorable state. Once again, she appointed new management, provided additional funding, and paid for repairs. As long as her health permitted, she returned to Samoëns to personally verify the effectiveness of these measures.

It was not until 1936 that a lasting solution was found: the signing of a tripartite agreement under which the National Museum of Natural History assumed scientific direction of the Alpine Garden, while the Cognacq-Jay Foundation—chaired by Gabriel Cognacq, the driving force behind the agreement—covered the bulk of the funding, supplemented by the municipality of Samoëns, which remained the owner of La Jaysinia.

Since 2023 it has been owned and maintained by the municipality of Samoëns. It is included in the List of Remarkable Gardens of France and is a Monument historique.

== Contents ==
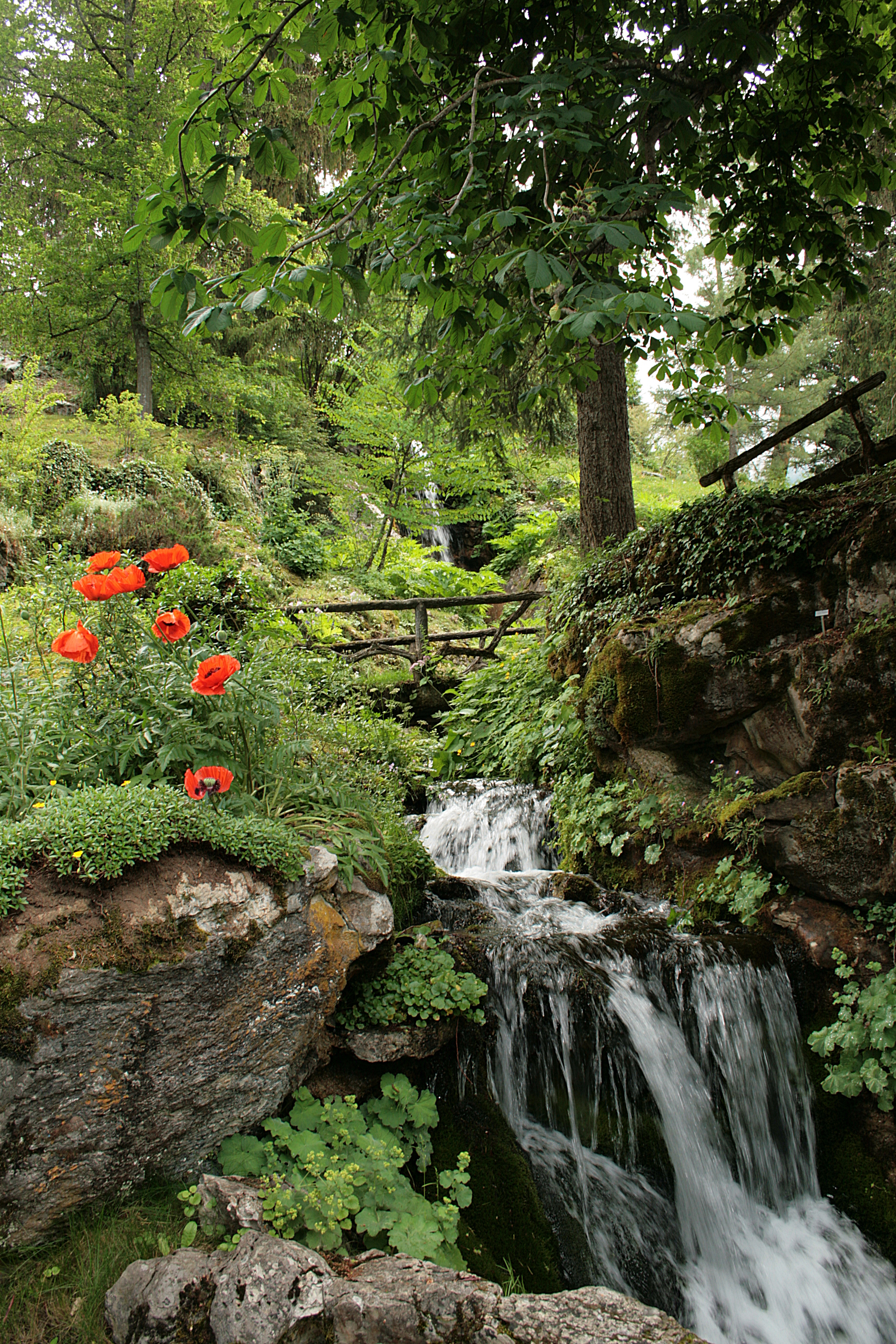
Waterfall of the Jaÿsinia in Samoëns (France)

The garden now contains about 8,000 plants from around the world, representing some 4,500 types of alpine flowers (including the rare Iris perrieri,) and 500 varieties of trees and shrubs.

As a member of the Association of Botanical Gardens of France and Francophone Countries, the garden participates in seed exchanges with many botanical institutions. These collaborations contribute to the preservation and dissemination of plant diversity on a global scale. The Alpine Plant Ecology laboratory was founded in 1937. This still houses a botanical laboratory containing a remarkable herbarium of nearly 40,000 specimens.

It is established at an altitude of 700–800 metres above sea level on a steep, south-facing limestone slope overlooking the old village, with garden features that include:

- the ruins of the La Tornalta castle (12th century), demolished in 1476
- a chapel (see below)
- fountains and cascades.

The Maison de la Jaÿsinia is at the garden's entrance. Originally built by the garden owner as a property for the town medical doctor, it has been vacated and now offers a reception area providing information about the garden and the history of its founder.

== Images ==
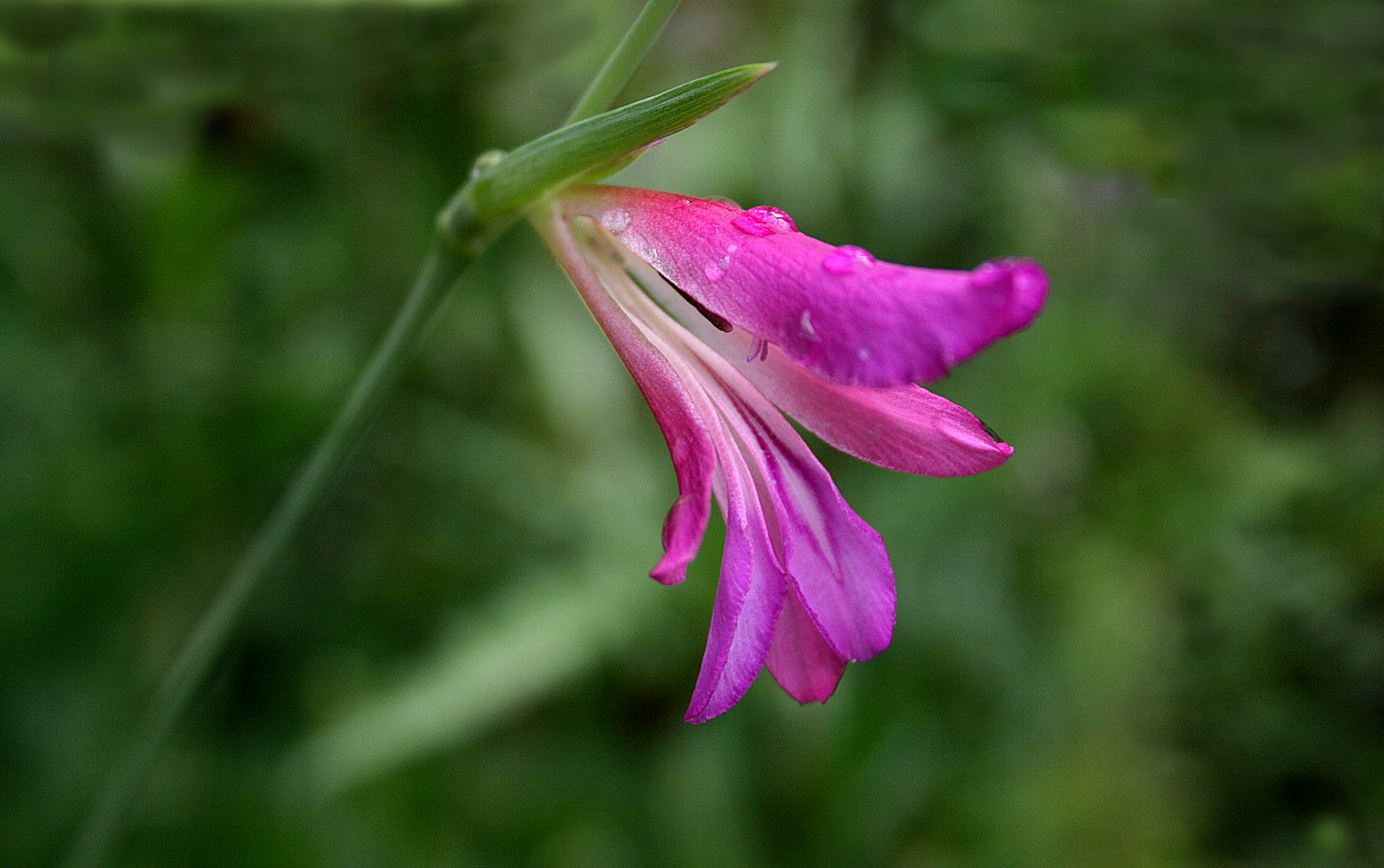
Gladiolus italicus

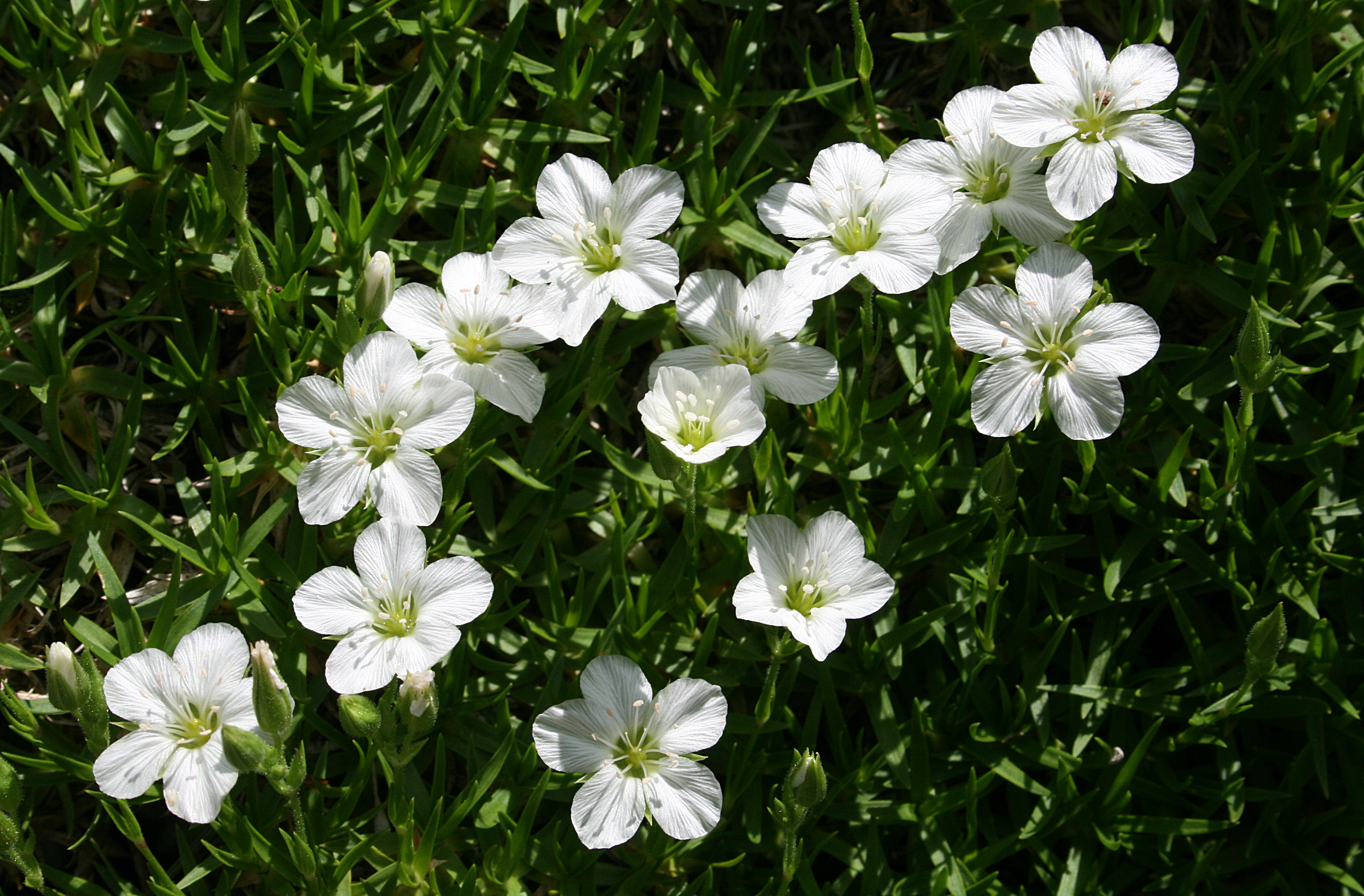
Minuartia graminifolia

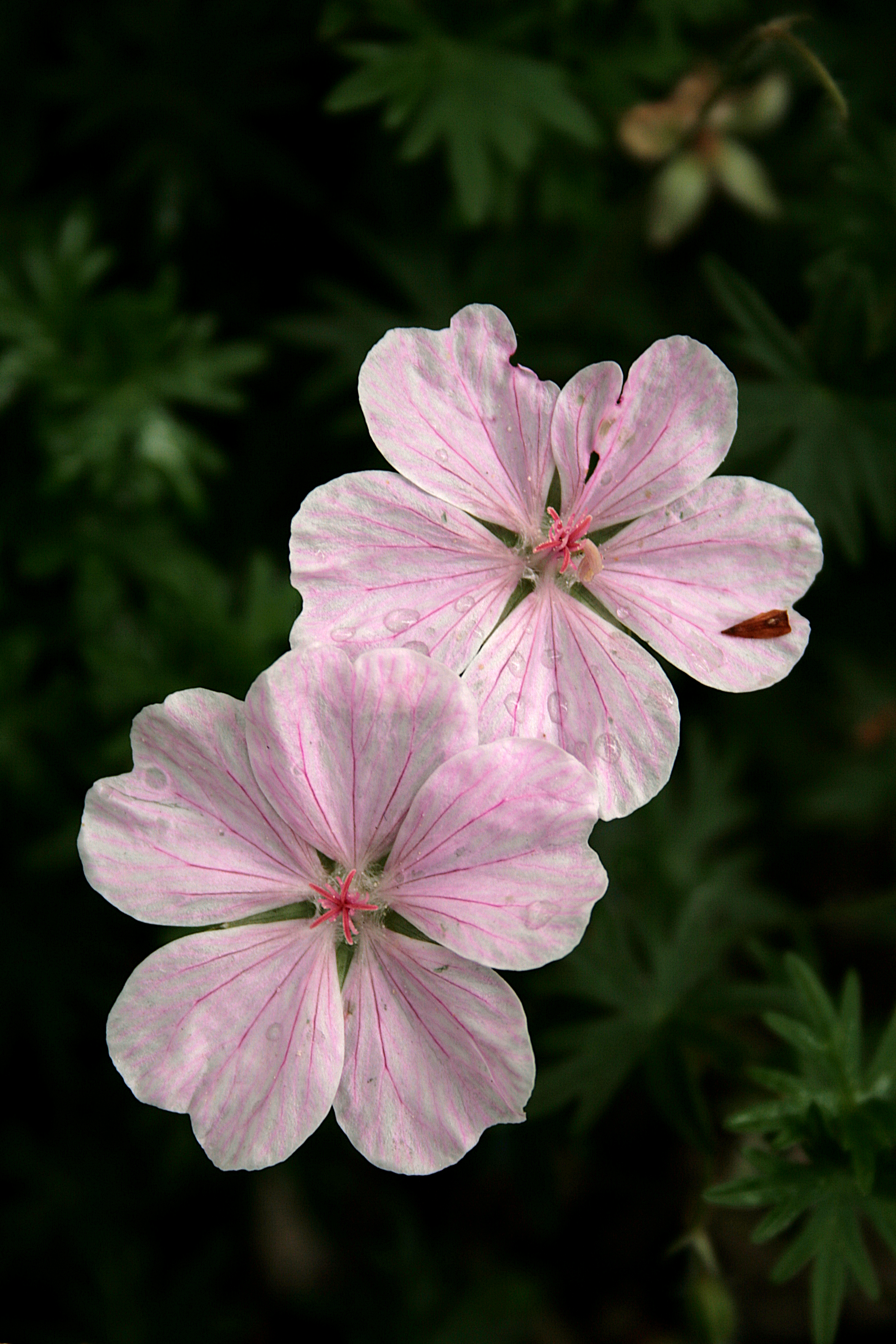
Geranium sanguineum 'Striatum'

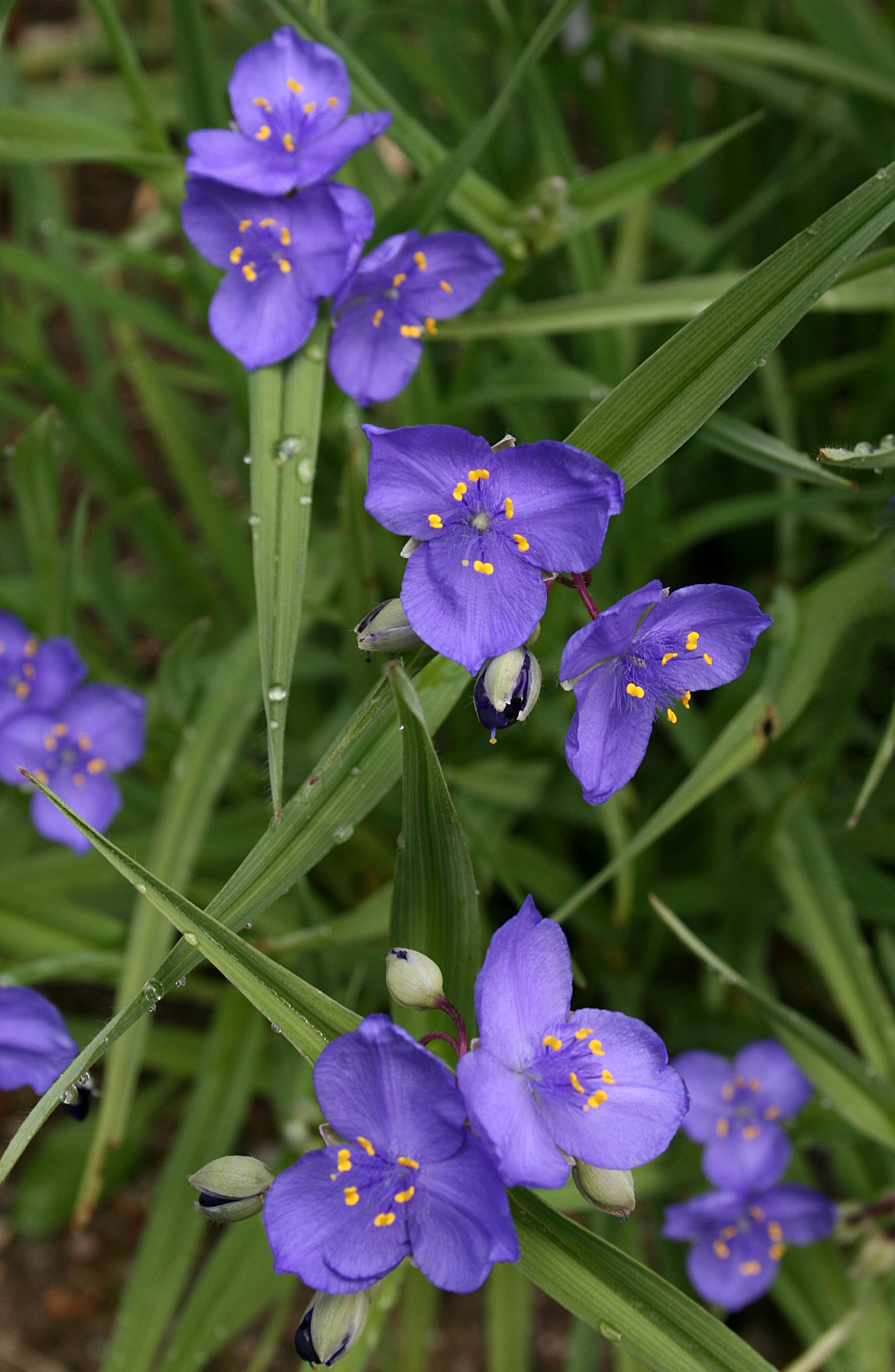
Tradescantia occidentalis

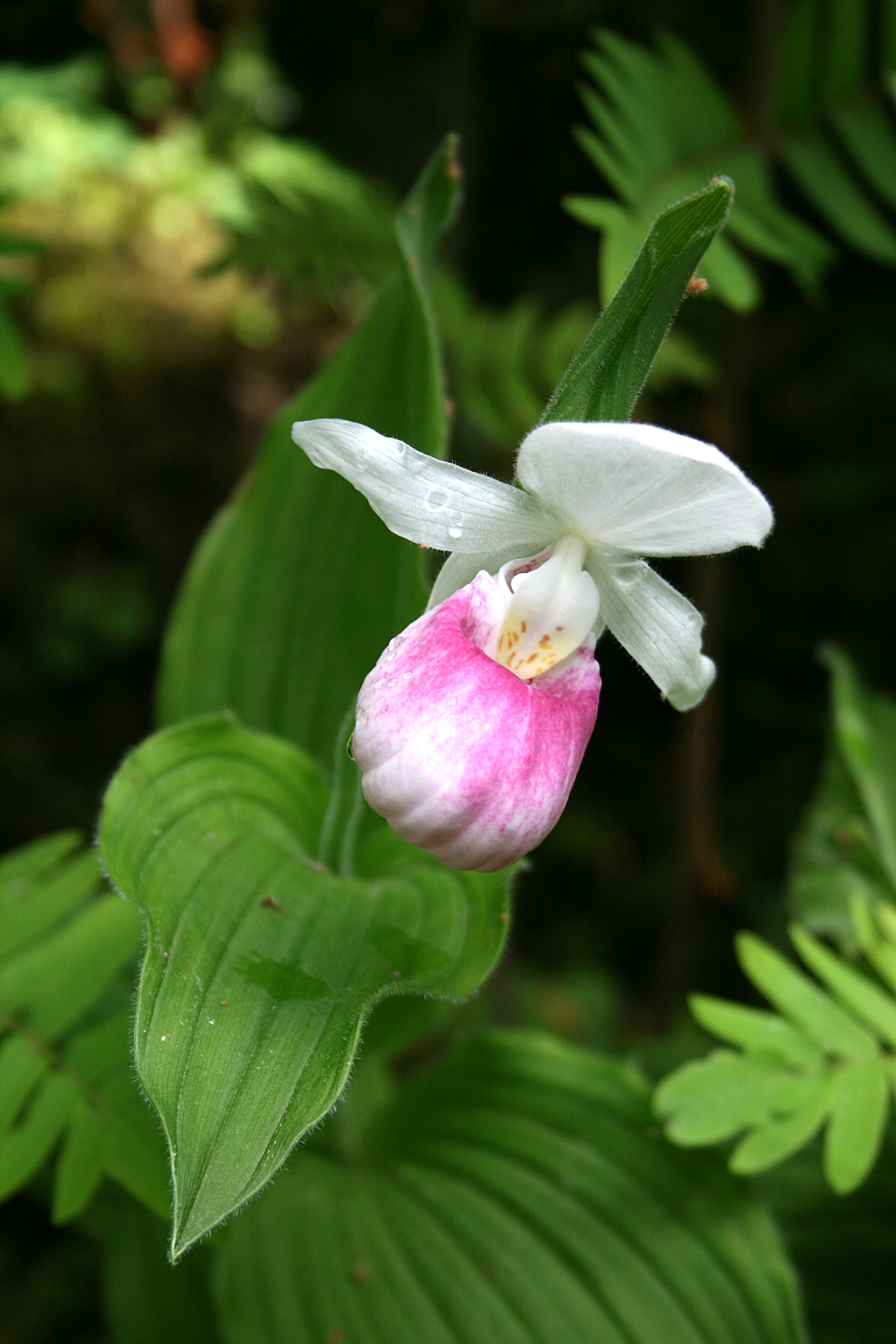
Cypripedium reginae

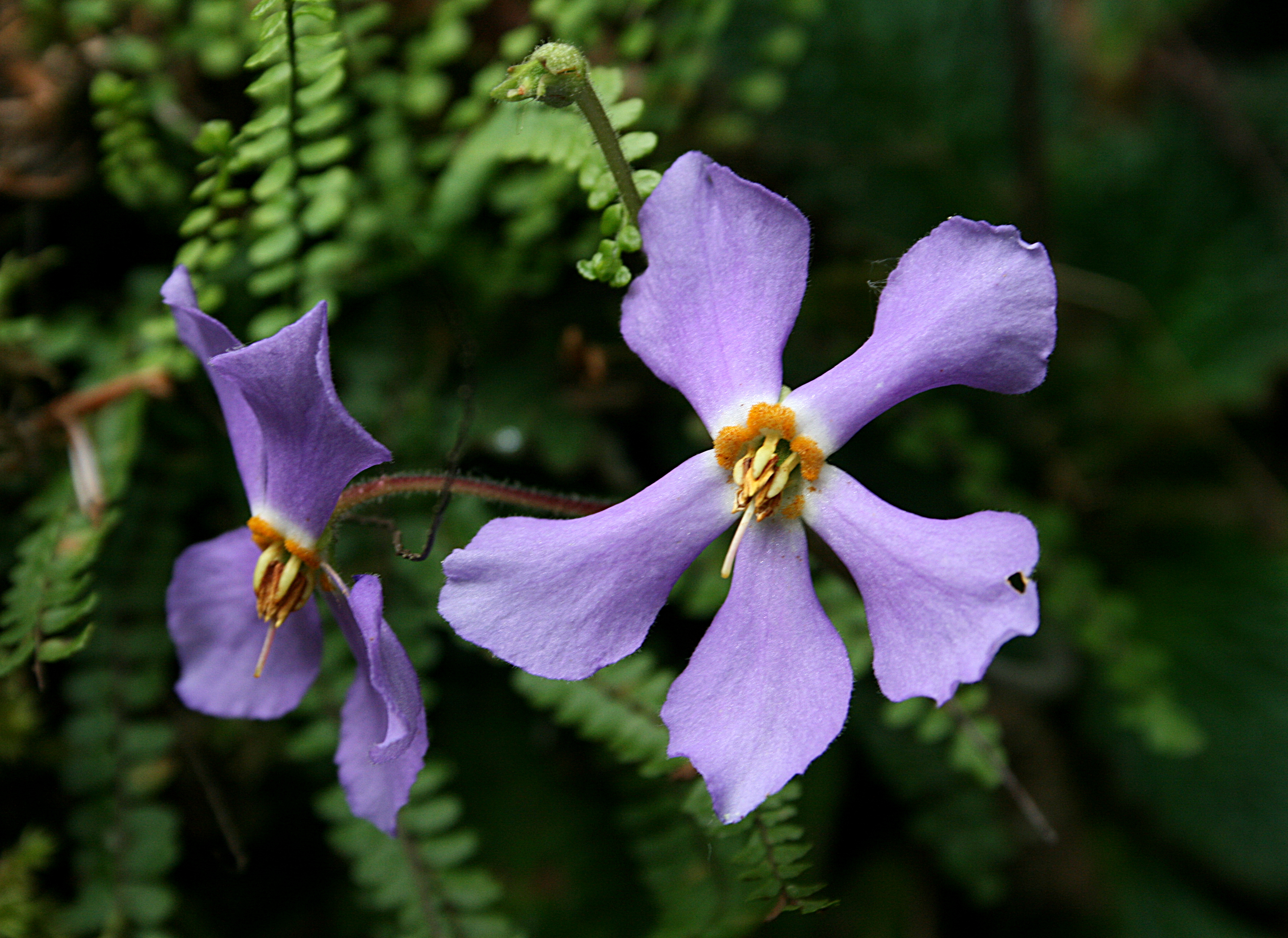
Ramonda myconi

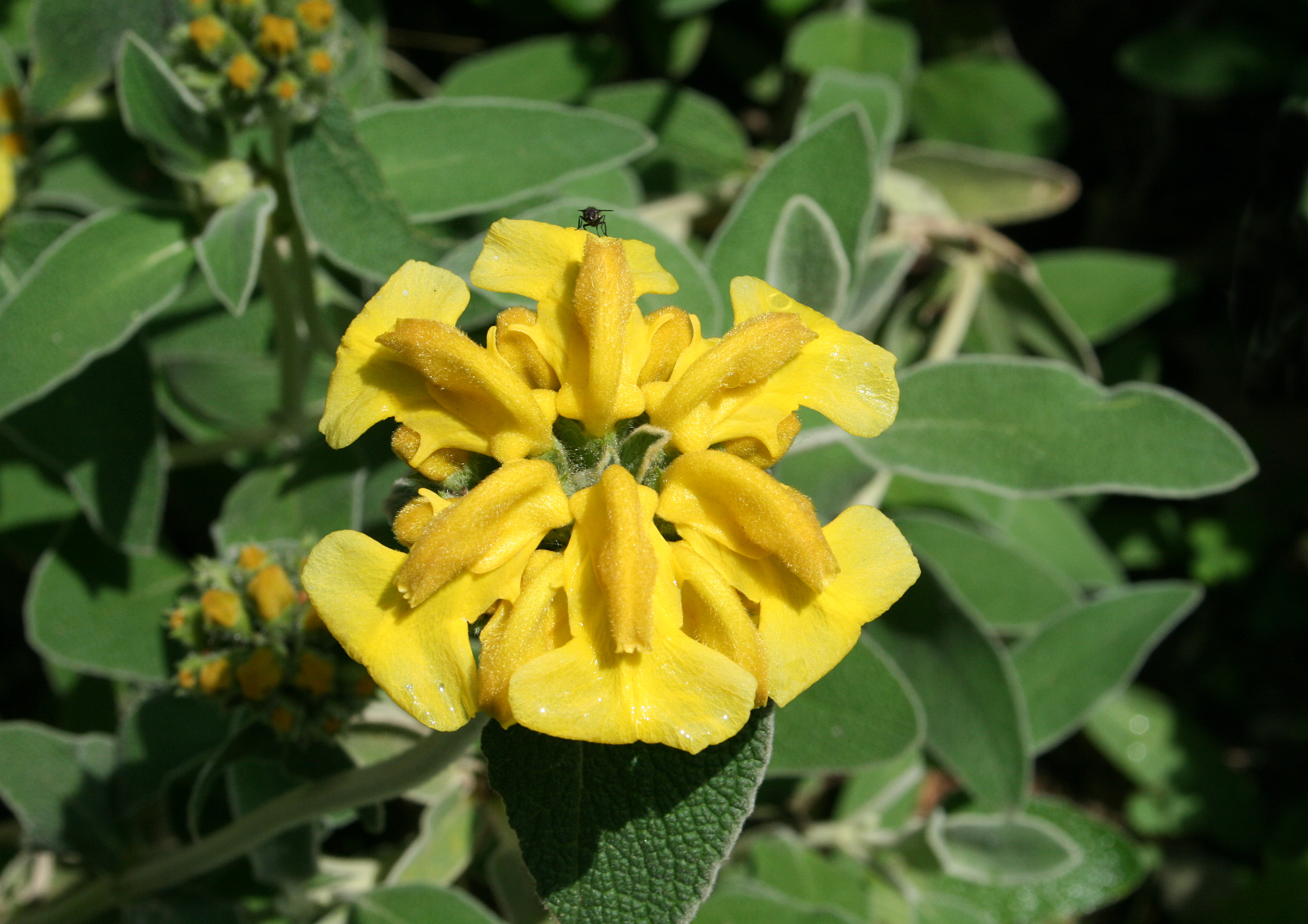
Phlomis fructicosa

== Chapelle Notre-Dame de la Compassion ==
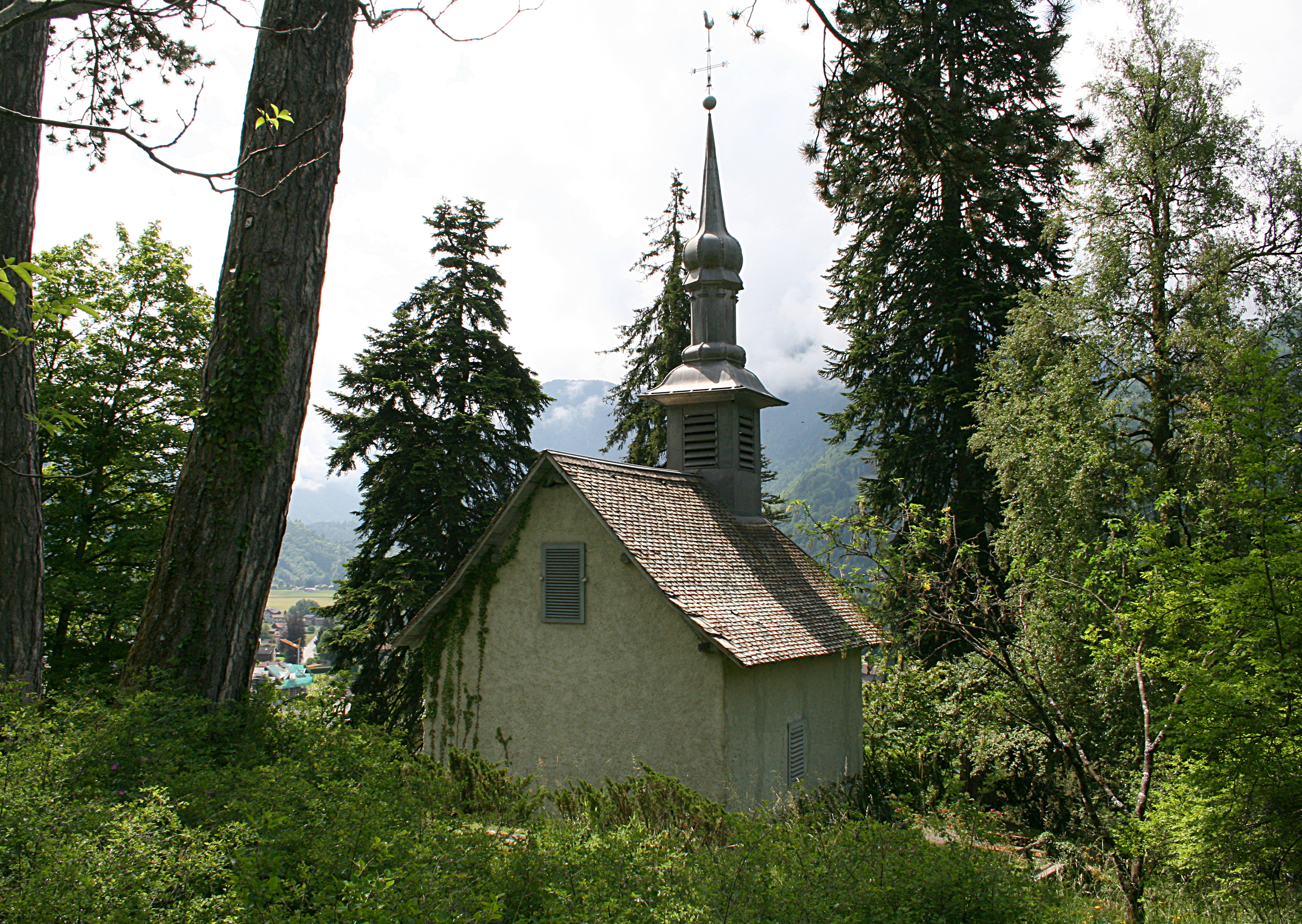
The chapel

The gardens contain the Chapelle Notre-Dame de la Compassion situated towards the top. It was founded on 19 August 1687 in the outbuildings of the old feudal castle of Samoëns.

The founder was Reverend Prosper-François de Gex, Dean of the Colliegiate Church of Sallanches and brother of Pierre-Antoine de Gex, Baron of Saint-Christophe, Lord of Vallon.

== See also ==
- List of botanical gardens in France
