= Marie-Louise Jaÿ =

French businesswoman (1838–1925)

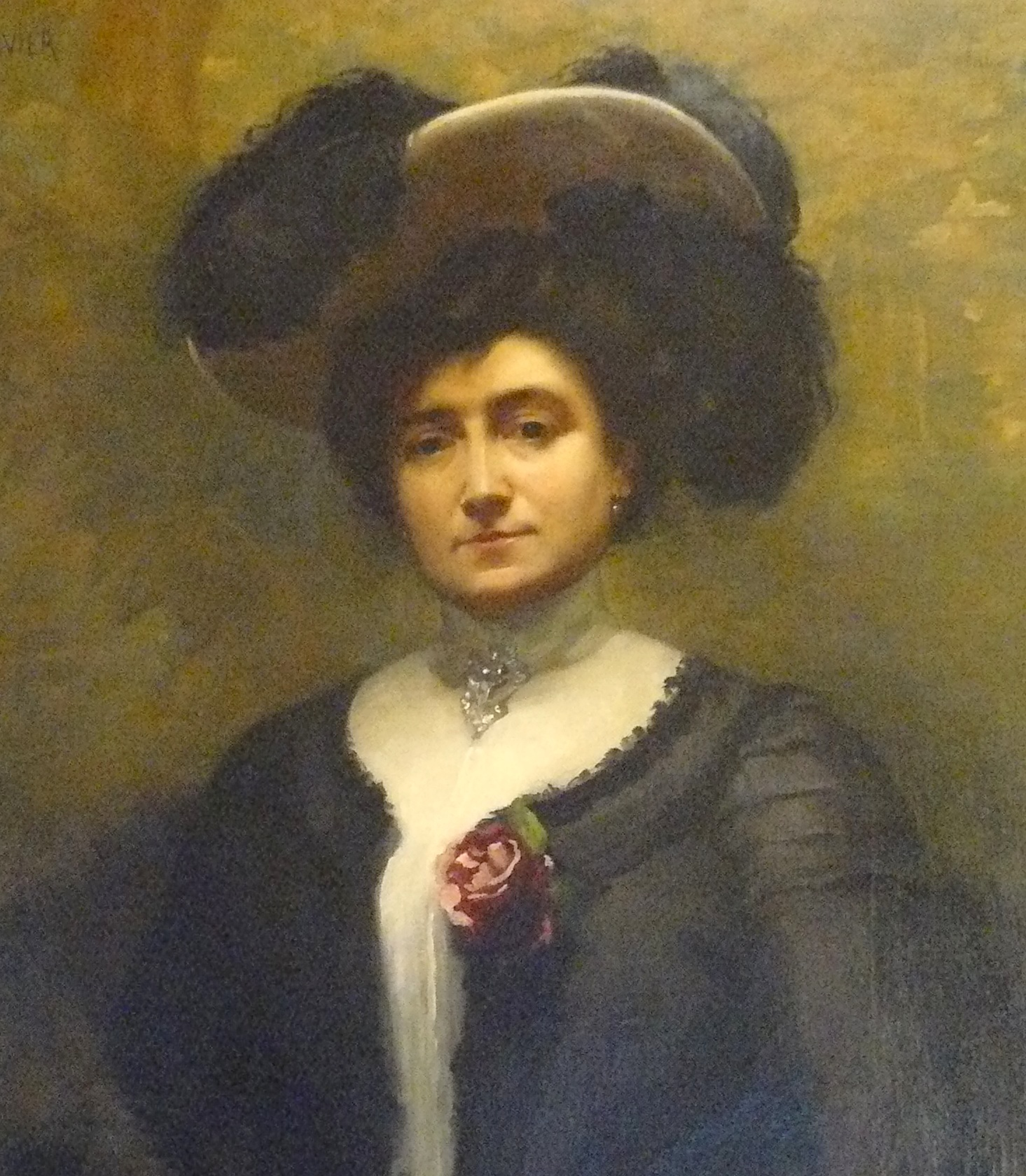
- Marie-Louise Jay in 1903 by Jeanne-Madeleine Favier (1863–1904)
- Born: 1 July 1838; Villard, Duchy of Savoy
- Died: 27 December 1925 (aged 87); Paris, France
- Occupation: Entrepreneur

Marie-Louise Jaÿ (1 July 1838 – 27 December 1925) was a French businesswoman who started work as a shop girl. With her husband Ernest Cognacq she created the La Samaritaine store in Paris, which grew into a chain of large department stores. Innovations included good lighting, clearly marked fixed prices, and allowing customers to pick out their own clothes and try them on before buying. The couple were active in philanthropic work, and gave out bonuses for large families during the population crisis that followed World War I (1914–18).

== Early years ==
Marie Louise Jaÿ was born on 1 July 1838 near Samoëns, now in the department of Haute-Savoie. At that time Samoëns was in the Duchy of Savoy. She was born in the nearby hamlet of Villard. Her father was a mason and her mother a peasant. The family included five girls and three boys. As a child she helped look after a herd of goats. When she was 16 she was sent to stay with an aunt in Paris. She started as a salesgirl in a lingerie boutique, where she learned the trade. At the "Nouvelle Héloïse" store she met a young salesman a year younger than her named Théodore Ernest Cognacq. She then moved to Aristide Boucicaut's department store Le Bon Marché, where she became the first female salesperson in the clothing department.

== Ernest Cognacq ==
When Marie Louise's future husband Ernest Cognacq was 12 his father was financially ruined and died. Ernest left school and began working as a travelling salesman between La Rochelle and Bordeaux. He then moved to Paris and worked in various stores, including La Nouvelle Héloïse, where he met Marie-Louise. In 1867 he opened a shop on Rue Turbigo, but it soon failed. He left Paris for a while, then returned to set up a stall under the second arch of the Pont Neuf. This had been the location of the Samaritaine hydraulic pump, which had been destroyed in 1813. He sold fabrics, towels and dish cloths on a counter made of crates covered in a red cloth. He was nicknamed "Napoléon du déballage" (Napoleon of the packing crates). By the time he was 30 he had saved up some money and was able to rent premises being used as a cafe at the corners of the Rue du Pont-Neuf and the Rue de la Monnaie. He called his new shop "Au Petit Bénéfice". The business prospered, and in 1871 Cognacq took a formal lease and hired two employees.

== La Samaritaine ==
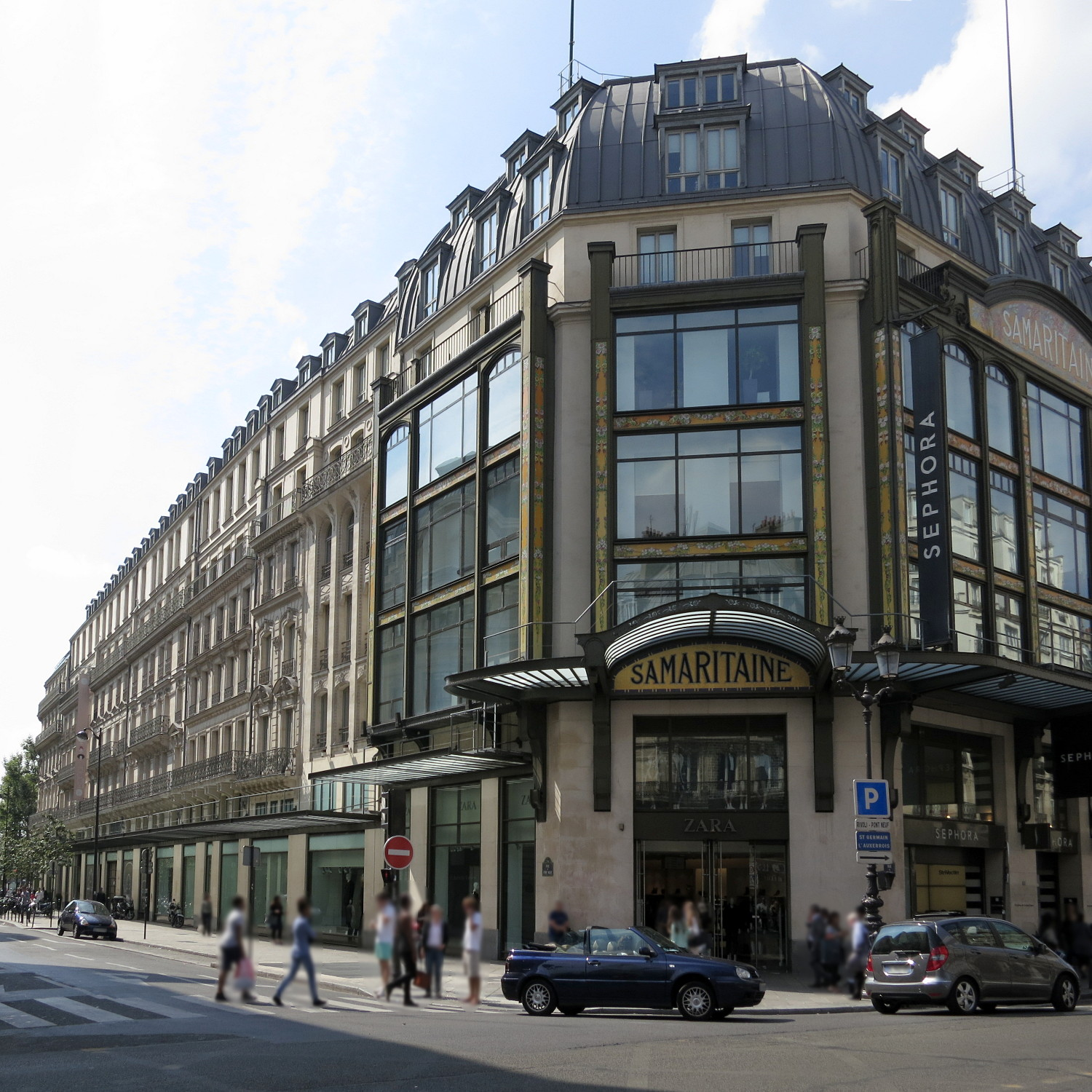
La Samaritaine at the corner of rue du Pont-Neuf and rue de Rivoli

Ernest Cognacq hired Marie-Louise Jaÿ as his sales assistant, and they married on 17 February 1872. She added 20,000 francs to his savings of 5,000 francs. The couple worked hard and saved, and managed to buy the shop, now called La Samaritaine. Her interest in change and innovation complemented his business acumen. They were innovative, and also copied ideas from Le Bon Marché. New concepts included clearly marked fixed prices, and letting customers try on clothes before buying them. Eventually the couple managed to buy all the surrounding shops.

Ernest Cognacq met the architect Frantz Jourdain in May 1883, a pioneer in iron-frame architecture and Art Nouveau. Jourdain redesigned the interior of the La Samaritaine store in 1891, and redesigned the couple's home on what is now Avenue Foch. In 1904 they had an iron frame building erected for them, lit by large windows. The store offered a wide range of goods and let customers pick out items themselves and take them to the sales desk. Further innovations included catalog sales and consumer loans. Between 1905 and 1910 they built four large stores. In 1905 Jourdain designed the second La Samaritaine store, which opened in 1910. It had a visible metal frame, twin cupolas, and a facade with panels of enamelled igneous rock.

Sales rose from 800,000 francs in 1875 to 6,000,000 francs in 1882, 50,000,000 francs in 1898 and over 1,000,000,000 francs in 1925. In 1927 La Samaritaine had 8,000 employees.

Marie-Louise Jaÿ died on 27 December 1925 in Paris at the age of 87. Ernest Cognacq died on 21 February 1928. They were succeeded by their adopted nephew, Gabriel Cognacq. By the 1990s the stores were no longer profitable and were sold to the LVMH group, which had already bought Le Bon Marché. They were closed in 2005.

== Philanthropy ==
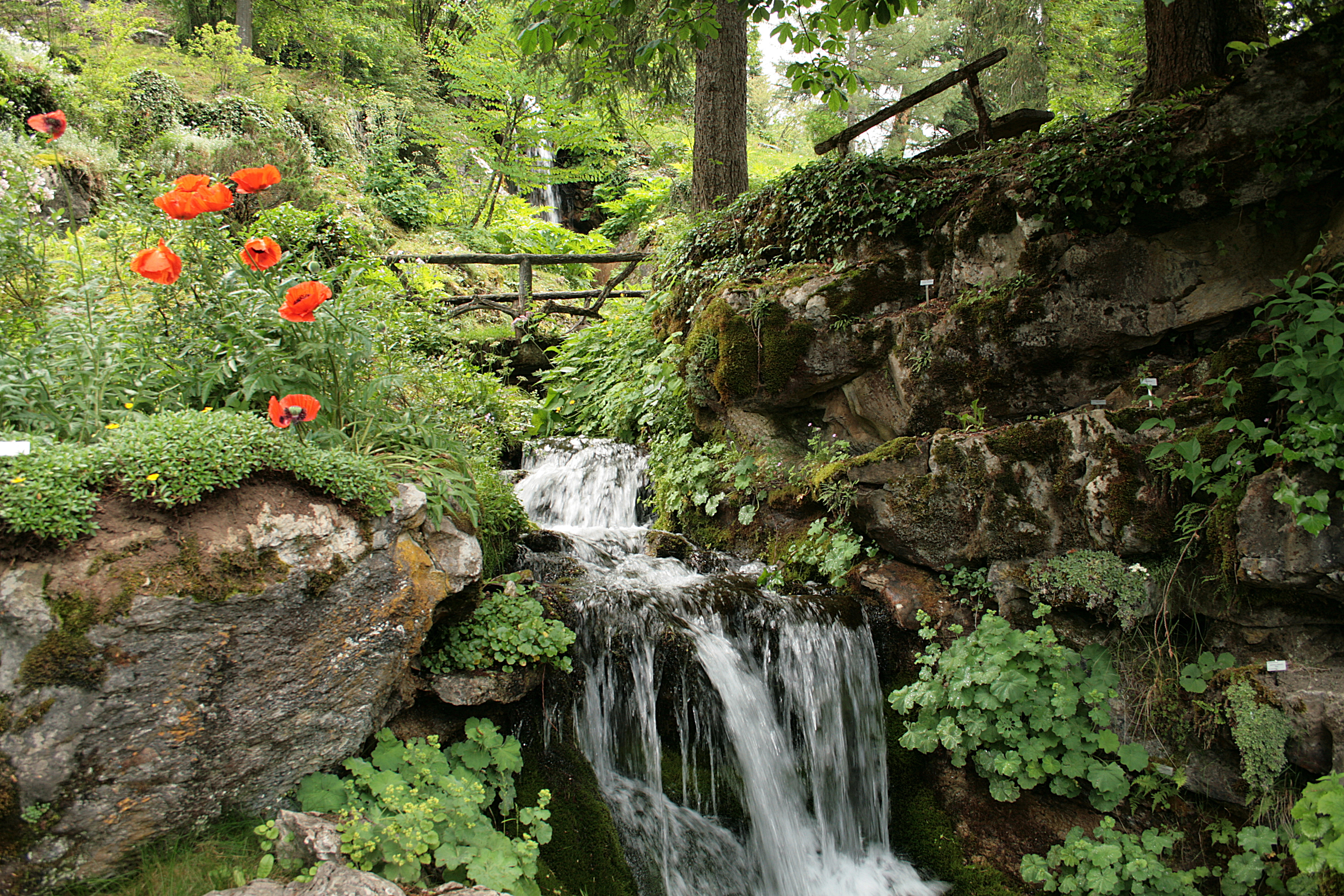
Jaÿsinia garden in Samoëns

Marie-Louise created the 35 hectares (86 acres) Jaÿsinia botanical garden in her home town of Samoëns, opened to the public on 3 September 1906. It holds more than 5,000 plant species from five continents. She also built a house for a doctor who lived rent-free in exchange for giving care to the needy. Ernest offered his home town the collections of a local scholar, which became the basis of Ernest Cognacq museum in Saint-Martin-de-Ré. Between 1900 and 1925 Ernest Cognacq and Marie-Louise Jaÿ assembled an important collection of 18th century art, which they meant to exhibit in their store La Samaritaine de luxe, opened in 1917. It included paintings, books and faience, and in 1928 was bequeathed to the City of Paris to become the Musée Cognacq-Jay.

From 1914 the employees were given shares in the company. 65% of profits were redistributed to employees, who also received benefits such as a free canteen. During World War I (1914–18) the couple created the Fondation Cognacq-Jaÿ, which was recognised as a public utility on 2 December 1916. The foundation's projects were often mostly for the benefit of their employees. It ran a nursery, convalescent home and nursing home in Rueil-Malmaison, a school in Argenteuil, a maternity clinic in Paris, an orphanage and nursing home in Haute-Savoie and alms-houses in Levallois-Perret.

The couple were childless. In 1920 they gave the Académie Française a fund of 100 million francs to reward 300 deserving large families each year in an effort to boost the birth rate after the war. In 1922 they added 16 million francs to reward parents aged 35 or older with six children.

== Sources ==
- Jeudy, Jean-Marie (12 April 2008), "Marie-Louise Jaÿ, la bergère de Samoëns", Livres en Marches (in French)
- Landru, Philippe (1 May 2011), "COGNACQ Ernest (1839-1928) et JAY Marie-Louise (1838-1925)", Cimetières de France et d’ailleurs
- Marie-Louise Cognacq-Jaÿ (1838–1925) (in French), BnF: Bibliotheque nationale de France
- Martinez, Christine (19 June 2017), "Marie-Louise Jaÿ à Samoens, un bourg du duché de Savoie épisode 1", France Bleu
- Parisot, Jennifer (27 August 2009), "Une petite bergère au destin prestigieux", Le Dauphine (in French)
- The Cognacq-Jaÿ family, Musée Cognacq-Jay
- Tissot, Janine, "Fondateur de la " Samaritaine " avec son épouse Marie-Louise JAY", fdaf.org (in French)
