= Samoëns =

Samoëns Samouens (Arpitan)
- Commune
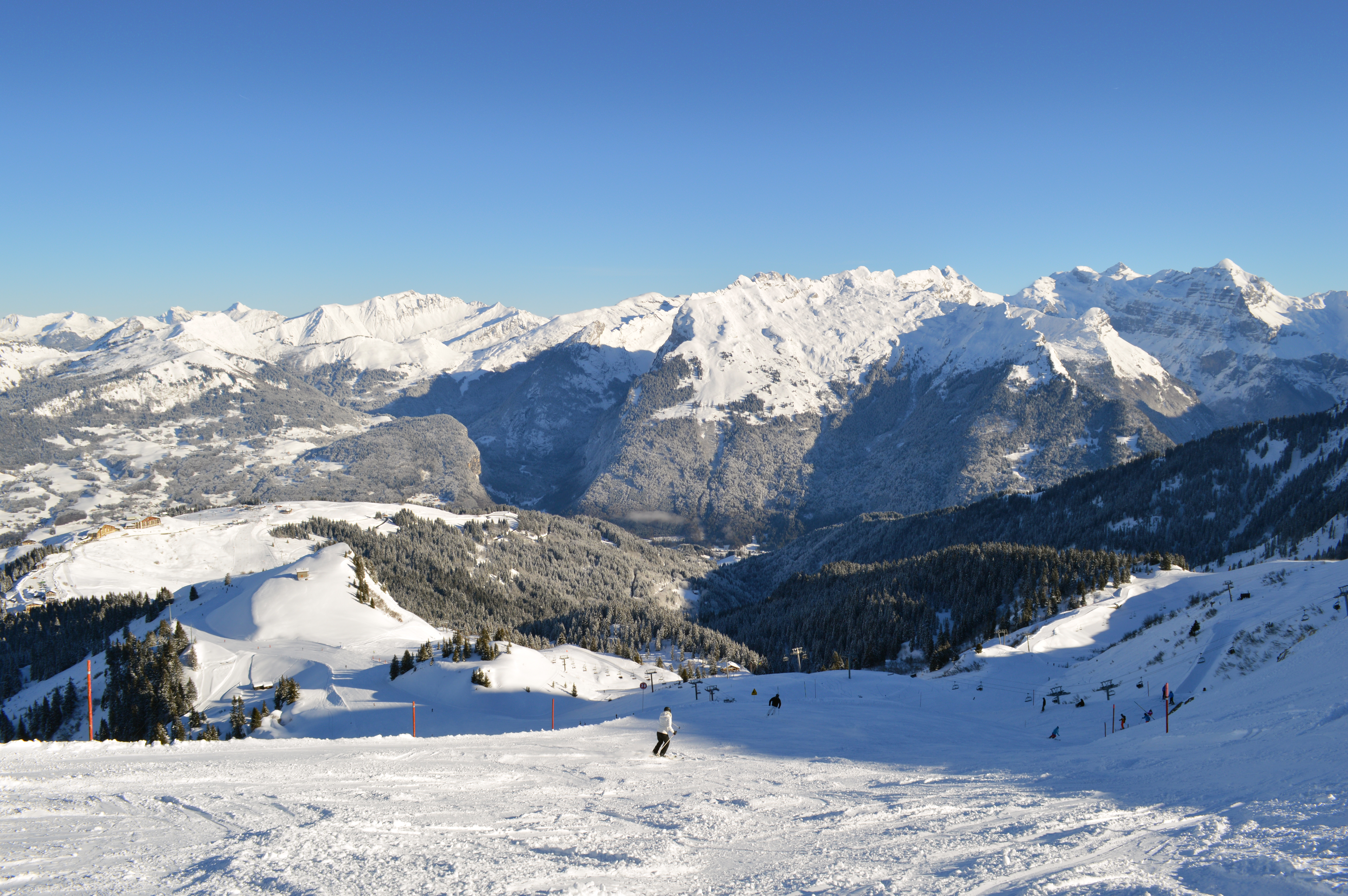
- A general view of Samoëns

- Coat of arms
- Location of Samoëns
- Location within France Location within Auvergne-Rhône-Alpes
- Coordinates: 46°05′05″N 6°43′41″E
- Country: France
- Region: Auvergne-Rhône-Alpes
- Department: Haute-Savoie
- Arrondissement: Bonneville
- Canton: Cluses
- Intercommunality: Montagnes du Giffre

Government
  - Mayor (2020–2026): Jean-Charles Mogenet
- Area^{1}: 97.29 km^{2} (37.56 sq mi)
- Elevation: 710 m (2,330 ft)
- Highest elevation: 2,665 m (8,743 ft)
- Lowest elevation: 671 m (2,201 ft)
- Population (2023): 2,203
  - Density: 22.64/km^{2} (58.65/sq mi)
- Demonym: Septimontains
- Time zone: UTC+01:00 (CET)
  - Summer (DST): UTC+02:00 (CEST)
- INSEE/Postal code: 74258 /74340
- Website: www.mairiedesamoens.fr
- ^{1} French Land Register data, which excludes lakes, ponds, glaciers > 1 km^{2} (0.386 sq mi or 247 acres) and river estuaries.

Samoëns (French pronunciation: [samwɛ̃]; Arpitan: Samouens) is an alpine commune on the Swiss border in the Haute-Savoie department in the Auvergne-Rhône-Alpes region in Southeastern France. It was the principal commune for the canton that bore its name until it was abolished in 2015. The town of Samoëns is located in the French Alps' Vallée du Giffre (Giffre Valley), just southwest of Champéry in Valais.

== Geography ==
The commune is situated in the Giffre Valley, traversed by the Giffre river. The territory includes alpine peaks such as the Tête des Saix (2,405 m) and the Pic de Marcelly (2,532 m).

== History ==
Historically, Samoëns was part of the Duchy of Savoy. The village received communal franchises in the 13th century. Following the Treaty of Turin in 1860, the Duchy of Savoy was annexed by the Second French Empire, and Samoëns became part of the department of Haute-Savoie.

== Population ==
Historical population
| Year | Pop. | ±% p.a. |
|---|---|---|
| 1968 | 1,647 | — |
| 1975 | 1,724 | +0.65% |
| 1982 | 1,954 | +1.81% |
| 1990 | 2,148 | +1.19% |
| 1999 | 2,323 | +0.87% |
| 2007 | 2,368 | +0.24% |
| 2012 | 2,285 | −0.71% |
| 2017 | 2,458 | +1.47% |
| 2023 | 2,203 | −1.81% |
Source: INSEE

== Stonemasons ==
Stone has long been a traditional feature of the Upper Giffre Valley which is dotted with limestone quarries (hardness coefficient, 13). To supplement their income from farming, the men in the region used to work stone.

In 1659, the frahans, the local terms for stonemasons and stonecutters, established a brotherhood in Samoëns. The organisation undertook charitable activities, including caring for the sick, and provided training for apprentices through a school of draughtsmanship that maintained its own library.

The members of the brotherhood of masons and stonecutters in Samoëns were contacted for leading construction projects. They worked with Vauban on his fortifications, were commissioned by Napoleon Bonaparte to build canals in Saint-Quentin, and worked in Givors and even further afield, in Poland, Louisiana and Australia.

To ensure that they were not understood by outsiders when talking to each other, they used their own dialect, called mourmé.

Evidence of their work can be seen all over the village, in its architecture. Even now, there are a number of stonecutters upholding the tradition in Samoëns and the brotherhood has become a cultural association, the Société des Maçons.

== Economy ==
The local economy, historically based on agriculture and stonemasonry, shifted toward the service and tourism sectors in the mid-20th century. The development of the Grand Massif ski area in the 1970s established winter sports as a primary economic activity for the commune.

== Tourist destination ==
The town carries the designation of a "ville fleurie" distinguishing it as one of the most beautiful towns in France.

Approximately a 70 km drive from Geneva Airport, Samoens is a summer destination as well as the site of a ski resort that departs from a lift (Grand massif Express) at the edge of town linking up to Samoëns 1600. Also known as the Plateau des Saix, this resort is part of the larger five-town Grand Massif which includes Flaine and Morillon.

Samoëns has been awarded the 'Famille Plus Montagne' label. Samoëns is the only winter sports resort to be classified by the Caisse Nationale des Monuments Historiques.

As well as skiing, Samoens offers a range of non-skiing activities including dog-sledding, indoor climbing, caving and diving under ice.

== Cultural heritage ==
The historic center of the village features traditional stone architecture with slate roofs. The Church of St. Sixtus (Église Saint-Sixt), originally built in the 15th century and later expanded, contains a 17th-century baroque altarpiece registered in the French Ministry of Culture's heritage database (base Mérimée).

== Jaysinia and the Cognac-Jaÿ Foundation ==
Jaÿsinia (3.7 hectares) is a botanical garden specializing in alpine flowers, established in 1906 by Marie-Louise Cognacq-Jaÿ, a native of Samoëns and founder of La Samaritaine department store in Paris. Since 1936 it has been directed by the Scientific Division of Botany from the National Museum of Natural History. It is open all year and is free of charge.

== Chapels ==
There are nine chapels in and around Samoëns, in addition to many shrines and other cultural buildings. Most were built in the 17th century, except for the chapel in Le Bérouze – dating from the 15th century – and the one in Les Allamands, dating from the 19th century.

Two of these buildings were moved from the sites where they were originally constructed. The chapel in Le Bérouze was originally built at the mountain pass known as "Col de Couz", but it was badly damaged during an invasion by Swiss troops in 1476. Four years later, it was decided to rebuild it on the main square. In Mathonex, the chapel now overlooks the village, but the original building was much closer to the village centre; its relocation became a necessity after a landslide.

== Transport ==
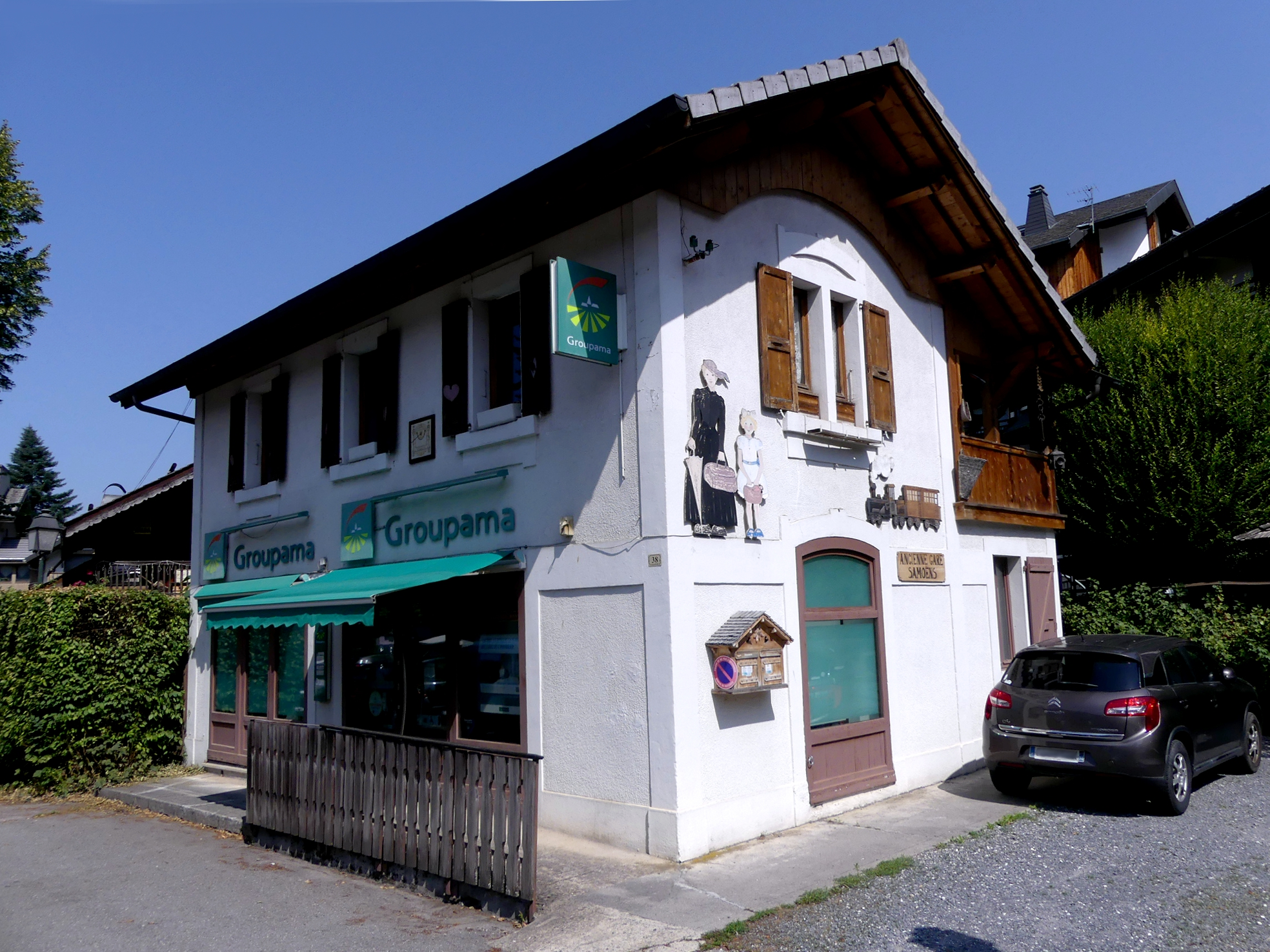
The old station building in Samoëns

A 44 kilometres (27 mi) tramway from Annemasse operated by CEN Réseau de la Haute-Savoie started services in 1891. Four services per day were operated using steam tramway engines.

On 24 August 1932 a 10 kilometres (6.2 mi) extension to Sixt-Fer-à-Cheval was opened and at the same time the whole line was converted to electric traction.

All services were closed on 15 May 1959.

== See also ==
- Reseau Jean Bernard
- Grand Massif
- Morillon, neighbouring commune
- Communes of the Haute-Savoie department
- Reference on village information, activities and accommodation
