= Flaine =

Ski area in the Haute Savoie region of the French Alps

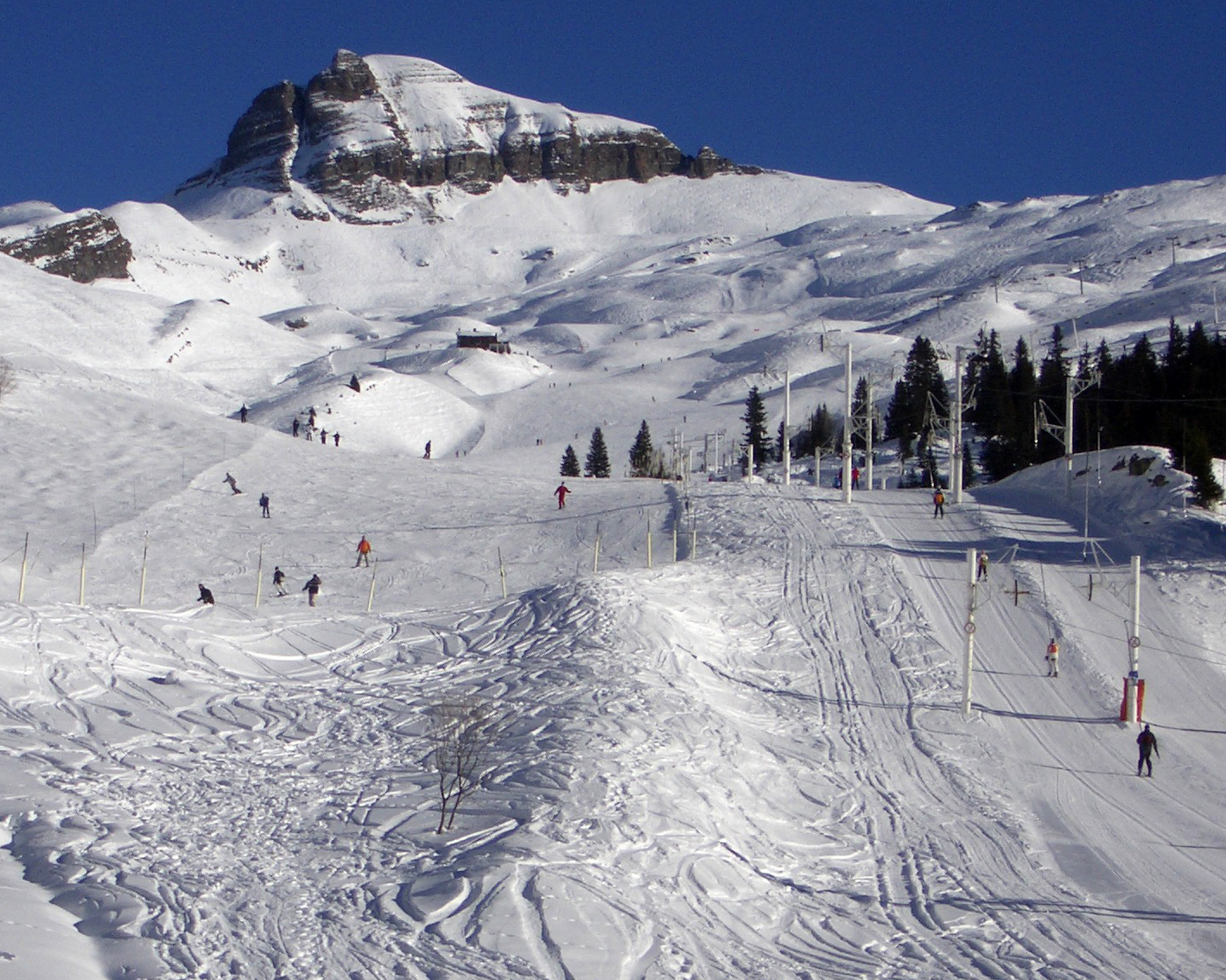
- Interactive map of Flaine
- Location: Haute-Savoie, France
- Nearest city: Geneva, Switzerland
- Coordinates: 46°00′15″N 6°41′45″E
- Top elevation: 2,561 m (8,402 ft)
- Base elevation: 1,600 m (5,200 ft)
- Trails: 64
- Longest run: "Cascade" (14km long)
- Lift system: 2 gondola, 8 chairlifts, 8 surface lift
- Terrain parks: 1
- Website: Official website

Flaine is a ski area in the Haute Savoie region of the French Alps, and is a part of the linked Grand Massif domain. It is in the territory of the communes of Magland and Arâches-la-Frasse. Flaine is linked to Samoëns, Morillon, Les Carroz and Sixt-Fer-à-Cheval, with 267 kilometres (166 mi) pistes in total. It featured the first 8-seater high speed chairlift, Les Grands Vans, and the first snow cannons to be installed in Europe. Flaine is often called the "big snowy bowl" due to it having one of the best snow records in the Alps. Flaine has been dubbed “the world's ugliest ski resort” due to the brutalist architecture of its buildings.

== History ==
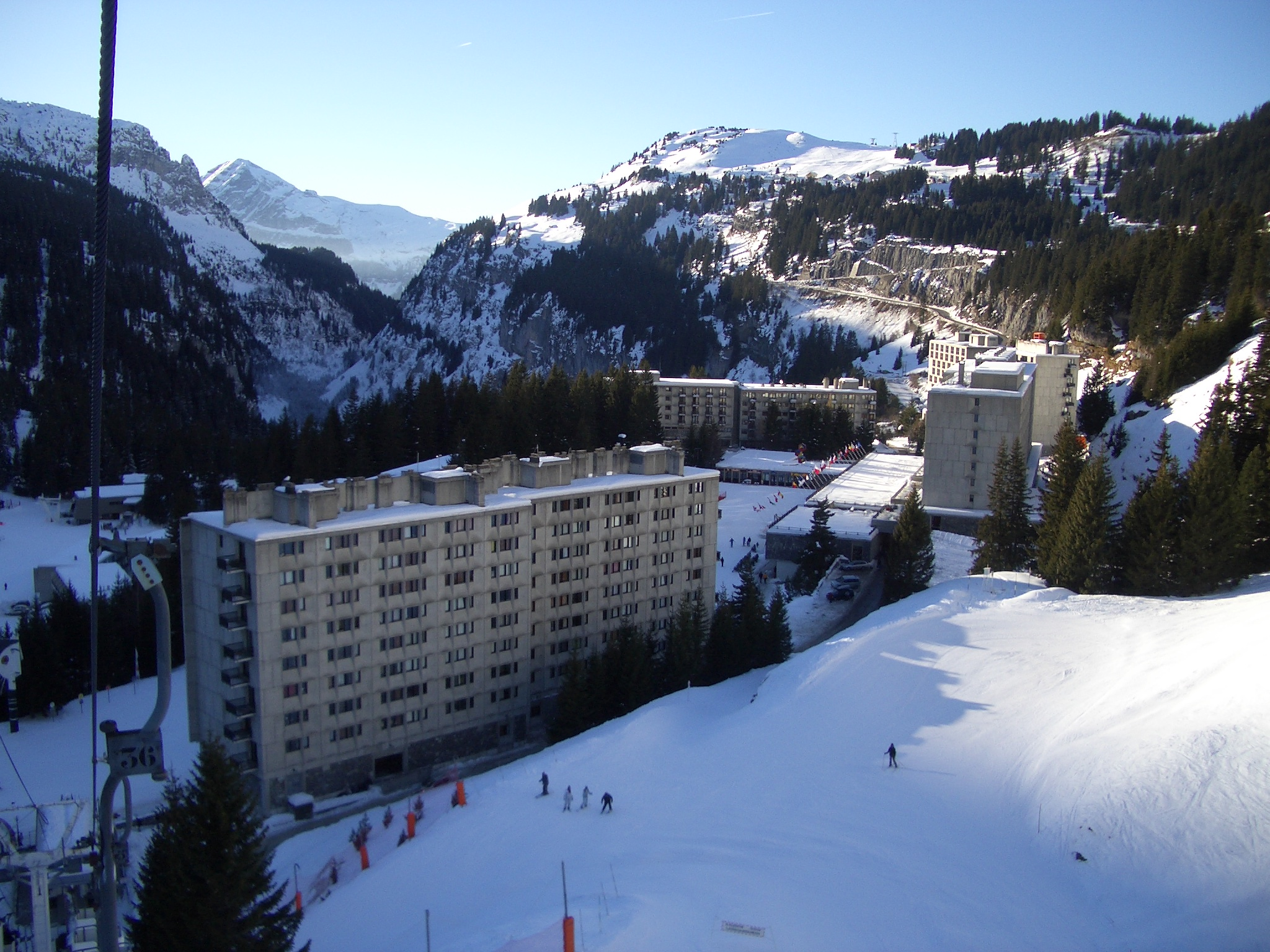

The site was discovered in 1959 by the geophysicist Éric Boissonnas and his wife Sylvie Boissonnas, who wanted to combine outdoor recreation with architecture and design, with the goal of prioritizing aesthetics and care of the environment. Éric and Sylvie Boissonnas entrusted Flaine's design to Marcel Breuer, the eminent Bauhaus architect whose structural designs are well known around the world. He designed the resort using brutalist architecture, with details such as sculptural fireplaces and door handles to hang a ski glove. Ski runs designed by champion Émile Allais, while gondola lift stations were kept on the same level as the ski runs.

Right from the design stage, Éric Boissonnas and Marcel Breuer were careful not to disturb the natural surroundings by integrating the resort into nearby mountains. The layout blends in with the environment's contours, and the different levels which make up the resort can not be seen from one to the other. While cables and wires were hidden in tunnels to achieve a feeling of privacy and tranquillity. They invited urbanist Laurent Chappis who helped influence their plans in order to preserve the natural landscape.

=== Construction ===
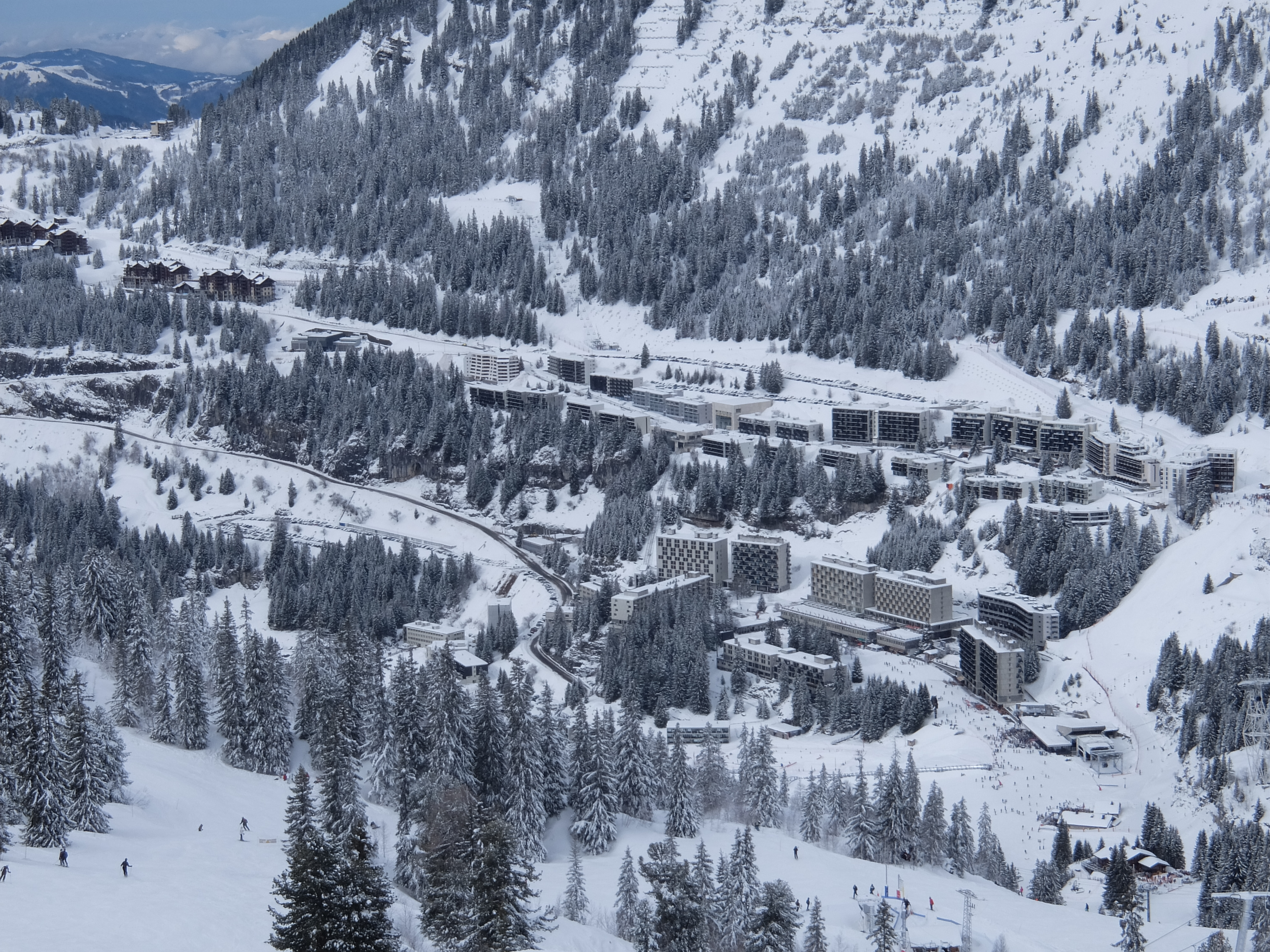
Flaine Ski Resort's main buildings.

The construction of the resort was not without difficulty. Chappis and Pradelle left after Breuer joined the team, Boissonnas fell out with the government official in charge of planning France's winter sports industry and when local landowners found out that Boissonnas was a billionaire they threatened to block the building of the access road to the resort until they received adequate compensation. The result was a three-year delay and huge cost overruns, and led to greater state involvement in French ski resort development. By the time the resort was opened on 17 January 1969 it had probably cost Boissonnas the equivalent of around $250 million from his personal fortune at 2005 prices.

The site is divided into two areas which are joined by two free lifts. The upper area, Flaine Forêt, at an altitude of 1,700 metres (5,600 ft), consists of a number of apartment buildings named after constellations, the Éric et Sylvie Boissonnas Auditorium, shops, offices and restaurants. The lower area, Flaine Forum, at an altitude of 1,600 metres (5,200 ft), has more restaurants, shops, bars and accommodation. It contains Europe’s first snowmaking system.

== Artwork ==
The resort boasts a wealth of monumental works of art - "La Tête de Femme" by Pablo Picasso, "Le Boqueteau" by Jean Dubuffet, and "Les Trois Hexagones" by Victor Vasarely.

== Location ==
Flaine is about 1 hour and 15 minutes away from Geneva Airport, approximately 3 hours drive from Lyon, and 30 km from the A 40 motorway (l'Autoroute Blanche). It is close to resorts Les Houches, Les Contamines, large ski area Chamonix-Mont-Blanc as well as the Portes du Soleil region — notably resorts Les Gets and Morzine. Trips to Italy via the Mont Blanc Tunnel to Courmayeur are also possible.

Bus services are available several times a day to Taninges in the Giffre Valley (where resorts Morillon and Samoëns are situated) where buses to Geneva and Chamonix can be accessed. The bus service is run by Transdev Alpbus.

== Terrain ==
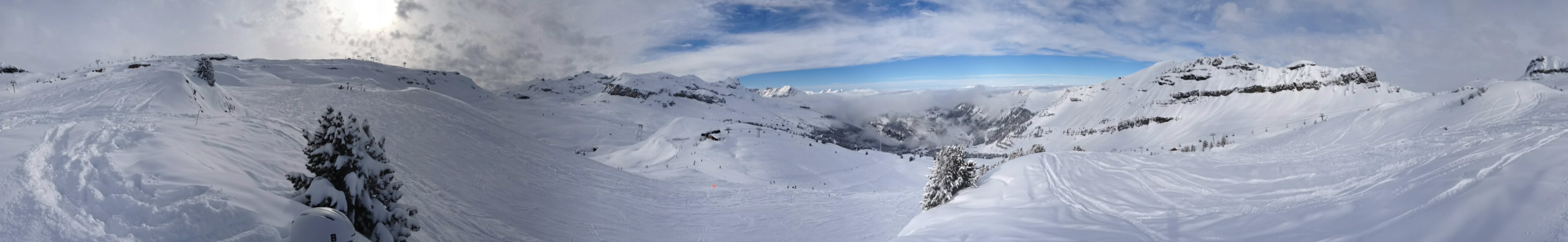
360° panorama of Flaine, from the Almandine run.

The ski area contains 64 trails and 24 lifts.

In each different grade of run (green, blue, red, & black) there is a theme in the Flaine bowl. For example, most of the blue runs are named after metals/jewels (e.g. Serpentine, Turquoise, Dolomie, Cristal, Tourmaline, Émeraude), nearly all the reds are diabolically named (e.g. Faust, Méphisto, Belzébuth, Lucifer) and most black runs after stones (e.g. Diamant Noir, Agate). Most green runs are named after trees (e.g. Mélèze, Pin, Epicea). This only occurs in the Flaine valley though; the other resorts' runs are named separately. However the same names are repeated in different resorts. For example "Combe", valley, is a popular name because of the many runs leading into valleys. Arête, ridge, is also popular.

== Lift system ==
There is a free lift (Télébenne) which links up the upper and lower parts of Flaine. Flaine is in the process of implementing an upgrade program to its lifts and trails called Flaine Perspectives 2006–2010. For 2006, new gondola cabins were installed on Aup de Véran, whilst the base station was renovated for 2007. For 2008, the Les Gerats lift was installed to allow better access to the new Intrawest village (Flaine Montsoleil). In addition the Tête des Verds 6-person detachable chair was installed from the main base area. For 2009, Flaine aim to renovate the Télébenne, installation of a 4-person chair to replace the Bois button, to be called Aujon and the installation of a 4-person chair to link the western part of the Intrawest village.

Name	Type	Make	Year Built
Aujon	Surface lift	Gimar Montaz Mautino	1972
Aup de Véran	8 person gondola	Poma	renovated 2012
Bois	Surface lift	Gimar Montaz Mautino	1970
Desert Blanc	6 person detachable chair	Poma	2011
Diamant Noir	4 person chair	Poma	2013
Forêt	Surface lift	Gimar Montaz Mautino	2014
Gers	Surface lift	Gimar Montaz Mautino	1970
Grand Grenier	Surface lift	Gimar Montaz Mautino	1984
Grandes Platières (DMC)	16 person gondola	Poma	renovated 2010
Grands Vans	8 person detachable chair	Doppelmayr	2000
Lapiaz	Surface lift	Doppelmayr	1973
Le Lac	6 person detachable chair	Poma	1999
Les Gérats	4 person chair	Doppelmayr	2008
Lindars Nord	2 person chair	Poma	1980
Stade	Surface lift	Gimar Montaz Mautino	1969
Tête des Verds	6 person detachable chair	Doppelmayr	2007
Véret	Surface lift	Poma	1969
Vernant	6 person detachable chair	Poma	1999

== Other activities ==
=== Music in Flaine ===
Académie Internationale de Musique (Flaine International Music Academy) is held every August. Its aim is to teach music to a high level and to hold free concerts in the Eric et Sylvie Boissonnas Auditorium a 500-seater auditorium. ‘Musique in Flaine’ came about when a number of music teachers involved with the Bain de Musique wanted to set up a high level academy devoted to chamber music.

=== Golf ===
The Golf course is open between July and September. It is positioned at the Col de Pierre Carrée at an altitude of 1,900 metres (6,200 ft), making it one of the highest golf courses in Europe. The course is spread over 3,500 metres (11,500 ft) of available green, and also has a driving range, putting green and training area.

== Evolution and environmental issues ==
Flaine is situated on a geological plate of rock called the "Désert de Platé". This type of rock formation is extremely rugged and cracked looking, creating a large number of crevasses and potholes in the area, which are particularly visible in summer.
