= Grand Massif =

Ski resort in Haute-Savoie department, France

Coordinates: 46.007°N 6.68312°E

Le Grand Massif
- Interactive map of Le Grand Massif
- Location: France
- Nearest city: Geneva, Switzerland
- Top elevation: 2,500 m (8,200 ft)
- Base elevation: 700 m (2,300 ft)
- Skiable area: 265 km (165 mi) of runs
- Trails: 146 (20 green, 64 blue, 49 red, 13 black)
- Longest run: 14 km (8.7 mi)
- Lift system: 71 lifts
- Terrain parks: 16
- Snowmaking: 1110 cannons
- Website: Grand-Massif.com

The Grand Massif is a ski resort located in Haute-Savoie department, France.

== History ==
1939 - The first ski lift of the area was built in Les Carroz. It was inaugurated on January 29

1945 - Samoens then built a 'télébenne' lift from Vercland to the Plateau des Saix

1950 - Morillon constructed a small funicular known as the 'Bossons Tele-Sled'

1951 - Sixt constructed a 'télébenne' lift six years after Samoens

1967 - Flaine constructed its first ski lift, the Grandes Platières cable car. Flaine also welcomed its first guests on December 6 even before fully finishing the constructing of the buildings.

1975 - Opening of the new link between Samoens and Flaine (via the Combe Vernant)

1976 - Flaine and Samoens reached agreement for ski passes allowing holders of either pass to ski in both areas

1980 - The Grand Massif was born as all the resorts were connected to the lift network

1981 - Two ski pass areas were set up, 'Grand Massif' and 'Massif'

== Resort Management ==
The resort of les Carroz (1140 – 2500 metres) is administered by the commune of Arâches-La Frasse and the resort of Flaine (1600 – 2500 metres) has been jointly managed by the commune and by Magland, a small town situated in the valley. Compagnie des Alpes ("CDA"), the world's largest ski operator, acquired four resorts in the Grand Massif (Flaine, Samoëns, Morillon and Sixt) in mid-December 1997, and in 1998 formed a global alliance with Canadian developer Intrawest. For Flaine this means the addition of 2,700 beds (with a further 2,000 in a second phase) and investments in new lifts, services and infrastructure. Les Carroz remains independent of the Flaine resort management.

== 2018-2023 development ==
The resort announced for a new six seat chairlift called Coulouvrier in 2018. This would link 1100m to 2100m, add 4 new pistes, as well as replace the aging 40 year old lifts: Gouilles De Rouge & Lanche. The lift was completed for the 2018 - 2019 ski season.

In 2019, the resort has announced for a new 10 seat gondola to replace the current Vercland lift which was built over 45 years ago. The lift opened before the 2021-22 ski season.

The resort plans to open a Tricable gondola lift linking Magland with Flaine in 2025. It will be approximately 5.5 kilometres long and will have a capacity of over 5000 people per hour.

== Les Carroz ==
Until the 1930s the village of Les Carroz was a simple farming hamlet with just a few houses. At 1100m altitude, it sits on a large sunny plateau overlooking the Arve Valley south east of the town of Cluses, on the road to Flaine. The village is part of the commune of Arâches-La Frasse. Whilst the busy periods are during the ski season (mid December to third week of April) and during the French summer holidays (July and August), it has a permanent population and is open all year round.

== Classic cascades run ==
This run goes across high mountain, down through the forests and past the cascade waterfalls to Sixt in good weather and snow conditions it is considered to be a special day trip for those that enjoy the scenery and tranquility of the mountains. Good access to Cascades is from the top of the long Gers drag lift, but to reach this the black Styx run must be skied first; Styx is open when avalanche conditions permit, but is variable in condition (sometimes pisted, sometimes not). Otherwise one can reach Cascades via the blue piste off the top of Flaine, but there is some poling to do. At the bottom at Sixt Fer à Cheval, a bus meets skiers to take them back to the cabin lift at Samoëns. There are some quiet and surprisingly interesting runs in Sixt (accessible via the Cascades drag-lift), but as of 2018, is only accessible via ski-touring as the three 1970 chairlifts were permanently closed due to aging status and lack of profitability to replace them. But there are still three drag lifts in operation.
