= Lac de la Vogealle =

Lake in France

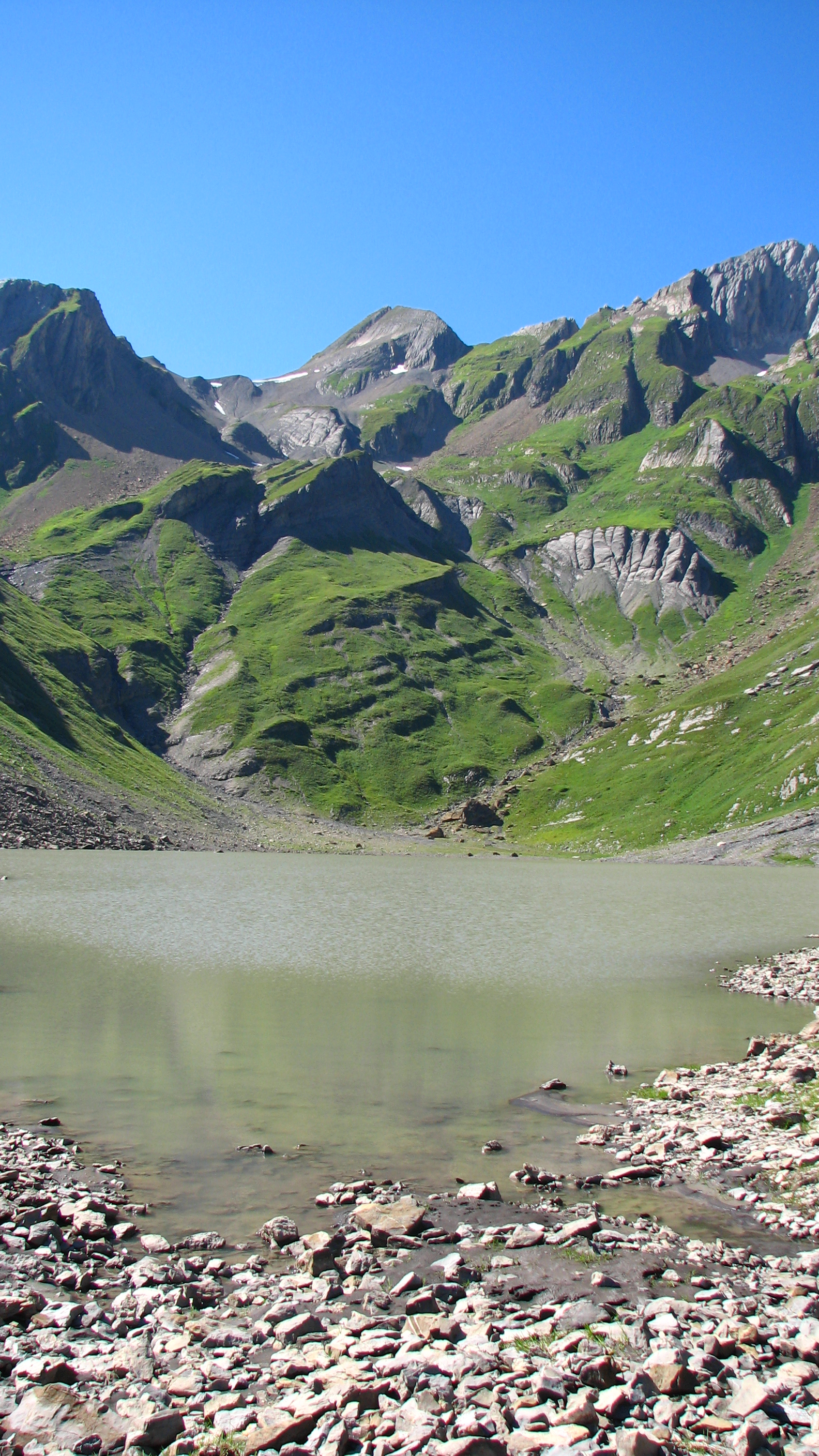
- (August 2008)

- Location within France
- Location: Sixt-Fer-à-Cheval, Haute-Savoie
- Coordinates: 46°7′14″N 6°49′35″E
- Basin countries: France
- Surface area: 7 ha (17 acres) (max)
- Surface elevation: 2,001 m (6,565 ft)

Lac de la Vogealle (French pronunciation: [lak də la vɔʒal]) is a lake in Haute-Savoie, France. It is located below the Dents Blanches and nearby the Cirque de Sixt-Fer-à-Cheval at an elevation of 2001 m. The lake's surface area varies seasonally. It is surrounded by several glaciers the Prazon glacier en the Ruan glacier as well as the Tenneverge Peak.
