= Cascade du rouget =

Cascade du Rouget
- Interactive map of Cascade du Rouget
- Location: Sixt-Fer-A-Cheval
- Coordinates: 46°01′38″N 6°46′19″E
- Elevation: 960 meters
- Total height: 80
- Number of drops: 3

The Cascade du Rouget is a waterfall in Sixt-fer-a-Cheval, and part of the Giffre-des-Fonds river, a tributary of the Giffre. It consists of 3 drops, the first 2 being the most obvious and visible from the road, and the 3rd being slightly more downstream.

It is accessible by road, and there is a car park nearby for tourists due to its popularity. It was named France's most beautiful waterfall in 2009, and its beauty has earned the nickname of "Queen of the Alps". It is one of the listed sites in the commune, along with the Cirque du Fer-a-Cheval and Gorges des Tines.

It is unsafe to approach the waterfall due to spray making the rocks slippery, and the strong currents which lead to the 3rd drop of the waterfall. In 2010, a man drowned after being pulled down the waterfall due to the high flow rate due to the spring snowmelt.

The water from this waterfall is believed to have links to fertility in local folklore, and there is a tradition of elders offering bottles of the water to newlyweds to ensure a prosperous household in the future.
