= Pic de Tenneverge =

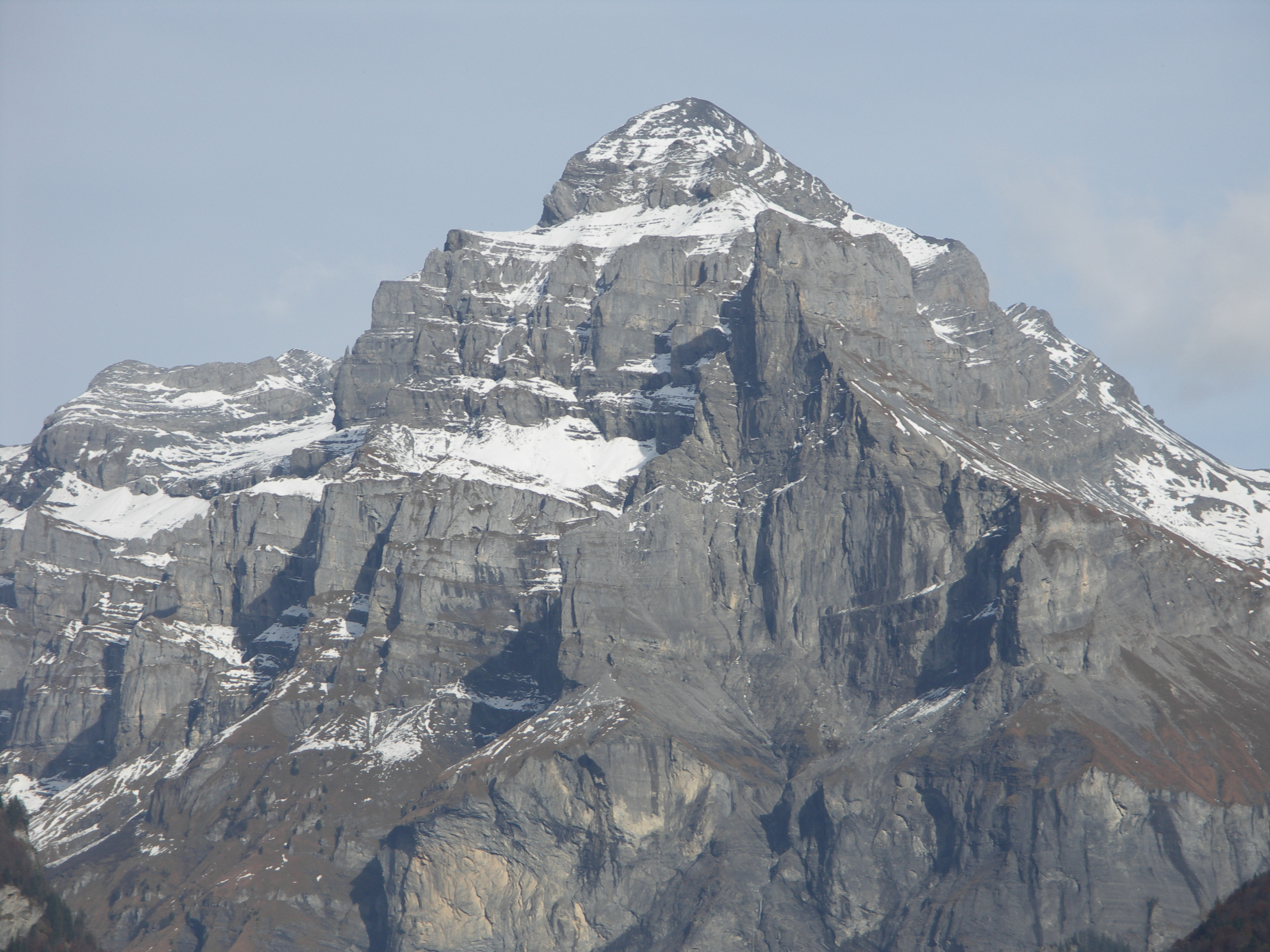
- View from Sixt-Fer-à-Cheval (west side)

Highest point
- Elevation: 2,985 m (9,793 ft)
- Prominence: 201 m (659 ft)
- Parent peak: Tour Sallière
- Isolation: 3.6 km (2.2 mi)
- Coordinates: 46°05′39″N 06°52′42″E

Geography
- Location within Alps
- Location: Haute-Savoie, France (mountain partially in Switzerland)
- Parent range: Chablais Alps

Pic de Tenneverge is a mountain of the Chablais Alps, located between the French department of Haute-Savoie and the Swiss canton of Valais. Its summit is 2,985 metre-high and lies within France, 300 metres west of the border with Switzerland (2,951 m). The mountain is located between Sixt-Fer-à-Cheval (France) and Lac d'Emosson (Switzerland).
