= Dents Blanches =

Mountain in Switzerland

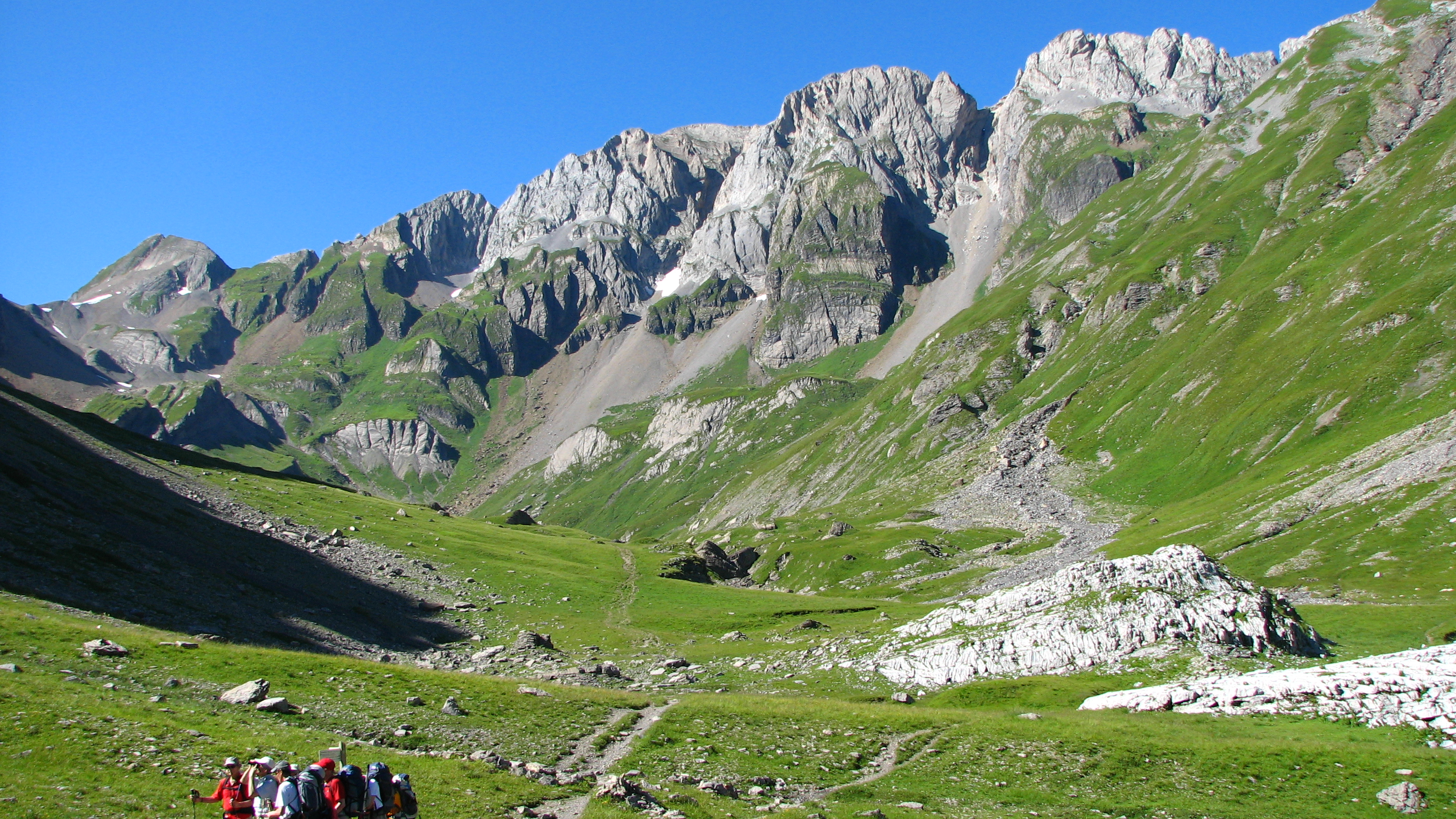
- Les Dents Blanches vues du Lac de la Vogealle

Highest point
- Elevation: 2,759 m (9,052 ft)
- Prominence: 364 m (1,194 ft)
- Parent peak: Dents du Midi
- Coordinates: 46°07′55.2″N 6°50′30.6″E

Geography
- Location within Alps
- Main peaks in Chablais Alps Mouse over (or touch) gives more detail of peaks. Location in the Alps
- Location: Valais, Switzerland; Haute-Savoie, France
- Parent range: Chablais Alps

The Dents Blanches (from French, lit. White Teeth) is a mountain in the Chablais Alps on the Swiss-French border. It is composed of several summits of which the Dent de Barme is the highest.
