= Sixt Abbey =

Former French abbey

- Abbaye de Sixt
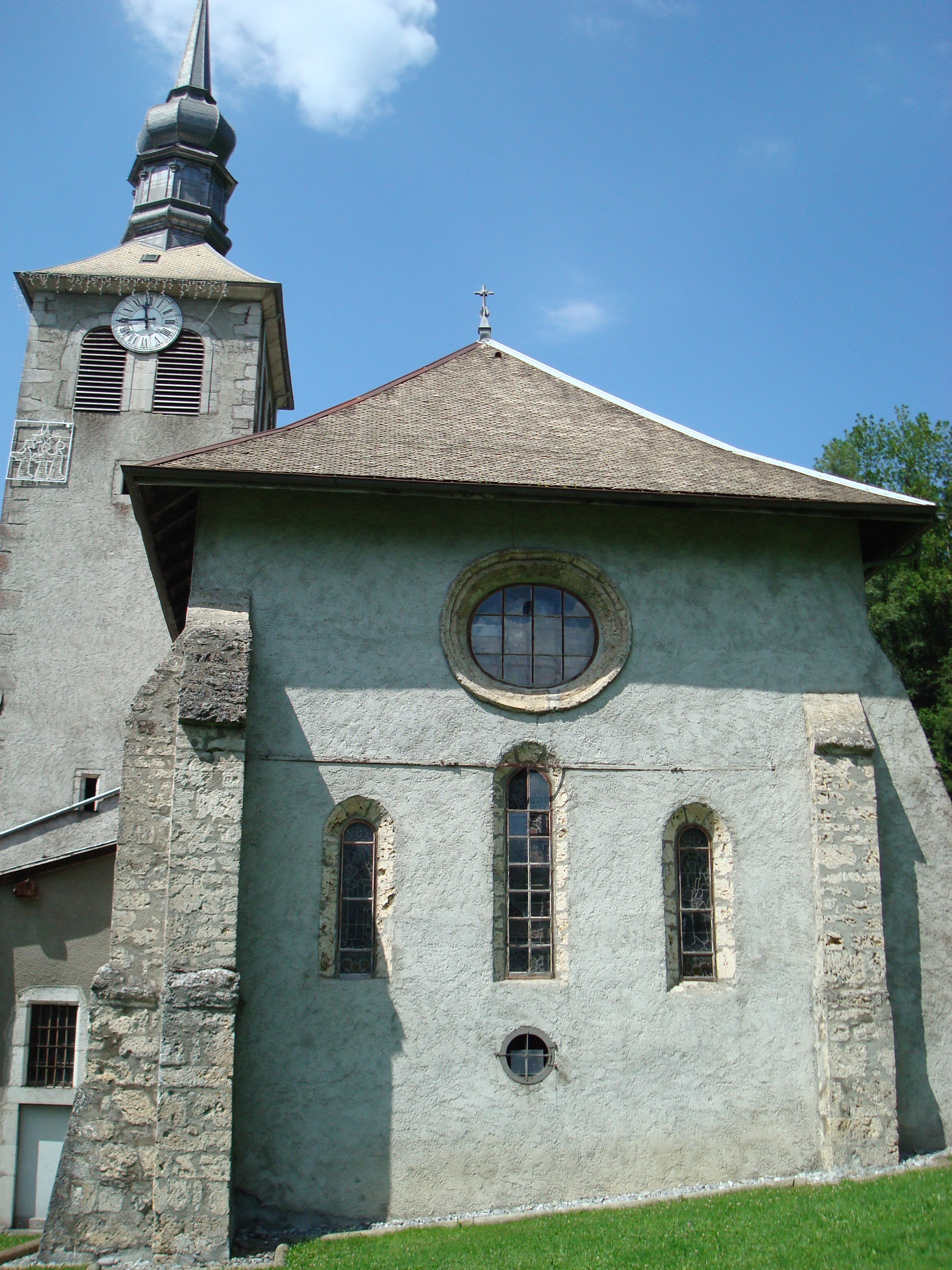
- The flat chevet of the Sixt church.
- Interactive map of Sixt Abbey
- Location: Sixt-Fer-à-Cheval, Haute-Savoie, Auvergne-Rhône-Alpes, France
- Coordinates: 46.055748°N 6.776691°E
- Type: Abbey
- Beginning date: 12th century
- Completion date: 19th century
- Protection: Listed as historical monument in 1997

The Sixt Abbey is a former abbey of regular canons belonging to the congregation of Abondance Abbey located in Sixt-Fer-à-Cheval, in the department of Haute-Savoie in the region of Auvergne-Rhône-Alpes, France. Founded before 1144, it was closed in 1792 following the French invasion of the Duchy of Savoy.

Only a portion of the original buildings survives today. The church, its granary, the former abbatial building, and the presbytery are listed as historical monuments by a decree dated February 17, 1997. Since the early 2010s, the former abbatial site has been the subject of archaeological and historical research.

The abbey played a significant role in fostering pastoralism in a high-mountain region during the Middle Ages.

== Geography ==
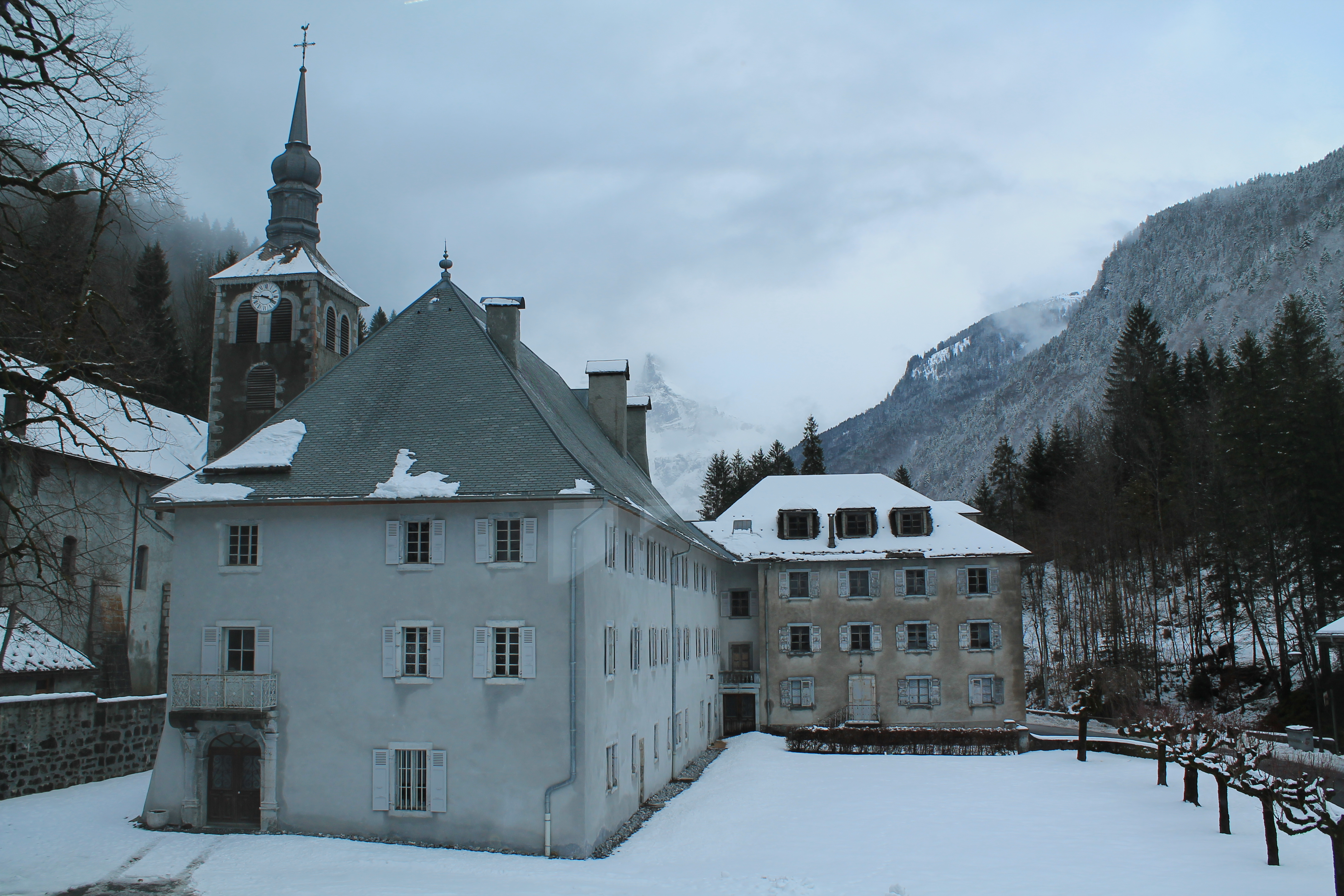
The Sixt Abbey in winter, Sixt-Fer-à-Cheval, Haute-Savoie.

The abbey is situated in the historic region of Faucigny, in the Haute-Savoie department, and within the commune of Sixt-Fer-à-Cheval. It was established at an altitude of approximately 720 meters on a terrace above the Giffre river, upstream of the Tines lock, at the confluence of the Giffre and Giffre des Fonds rivers.

== History ==
=== Foundation in the 12th century ===
A priory was founded by regular canons of Saint Augustine from Abondance Abbey at an unknown date but before 1144, when the priory was elevated to an abbey. The canons settled on lands granted by Aymon I of Faucigny, Lord of Faucigny. The first abbot was Ponce. Contrary to the legendary account of Ponce's life written by Canon Jean Depassier and published in 1666, there is no evidence that Ponce was a member of the House of Faucigny. In February 1156, Pope Adrian IV confirmed the abbey's possessions and rights. In 1161, a dispute between the canons of Sixt and those of Abondance was resolved through the mediation of several prelates and knights from Savoy and Faucigny. In 1167, Arducius de Faucigny, Bishop of Geneva, confirmed the donation of the Samoëns parish to the abbey, with the deed drafted at Sixt Abbey. Before his death around 1166, Aymon I of Faucigny became a canon of the abbey and may have been buried there.

Archaeological excavations have identified the foundations of this early abbey. Surrounding a Romanesque cloister adorned with decorated capitals, at least two buildings were organized: the church and the southern wing. The southern wing measured 26 meters in length and 8.5 meters in width, likely housing a refectory and kitchen on the ground floor and a dormitory on the first floor, similar to a Benedictine abbey. The Romanesque church was rebuilt in later periods and remains largely unknown.

=== 13th century ===
The abbey grew in wealth and size during the 13th century. In 1200, Abbot Almaric secured jurisdiction over the inhabitants of the Sixt valley from Guillaume de Faucigny, with privileges confirmed in 1234 and 1318. In February 1204, Pope Innocent III issued a papal bull confirming the abbey's possessions and assets. That same month, the pope addressed a letter to Bishop Nantelme of Geneva regarding disputes over the Samoëns parish church. The abbot also managed conflicts arising from donations made in the previous century by Turembert de Lucinges. Aymon II de Faucigny repeatedly confirmed donations made to the regular canons by his vassals and ancestors, and made donations himself.

The church was at least partially rebuilt in the 13th century with the addition of a Gothic choir featuring a flat chevet with a triplet. An eastern wing, uncovered during excavations, included a chapter house on the ground floor, widely open to the eastern cloister gallery.

From 1282 to 1292, the church housed the remains of the heir of Viennois, son of Béatrice de Faucigny, the Great Dauphine, until the completion of the Chartreuse de Mélan. Other members of the Faucigny aristocracy were also buried at Sixt.

=== Late Middle Ages ===
In 1411, Jean V de Bertrand, Bishop of Geneva, visited Sixt Abbey and noted that the regular life was no longer observed and that the buildings required urgent repairs. In 1418, the canons and abbot leased the Sales alpage for a significant sum of 400 gold florins to fund these repairs. The enclosure was rebuilt with a corner tower near the main entrance. In the church, a southern lateral chapel was built at the expense of the chapter house, which was reduced in length.

=== Early Modern Period ===
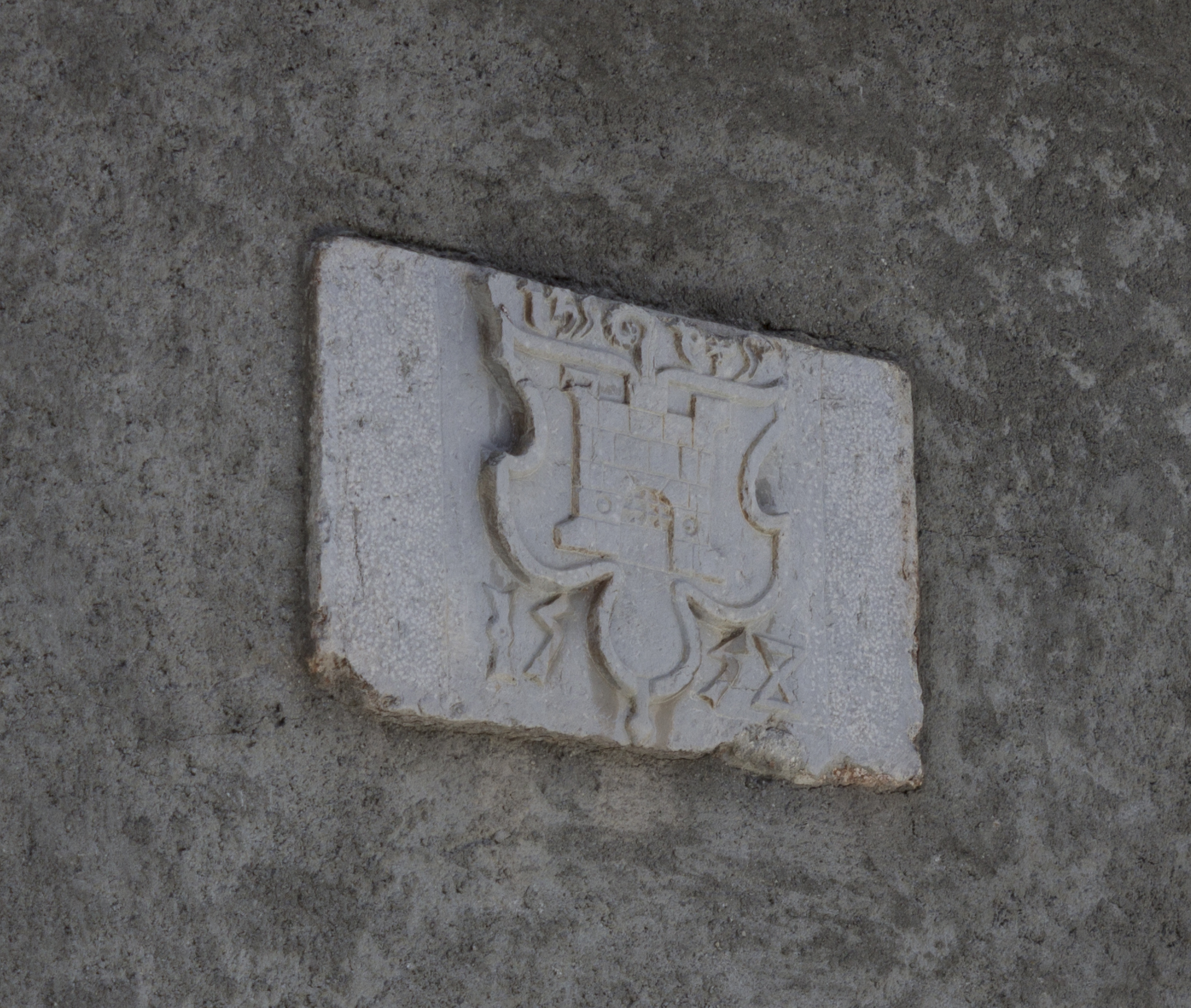
Keystone of the abbey gate, dated 1558.

The first commendatory abbot appointed to Sixt Abbey was the Venetian cardinal Giovanni Battista Zeno, who died in 1501. In the 16th century, the abbey’s enclosure was rebuilt, with the gate’s keystone inscribed with the year 1558. This keystone is now integrated into one of the presbytery’s façades. Pilgrimages to the tomb and fountain of the founding abbot, Ponce, are documented from the early 17th century. Francis de Sales, Bishop of Geneva, reformed the abbey during this period and opened Ponce’s tomb on November 14, 1620. Around the same time, Abondance Abbey saw its regular canons replaced by Cistercian Feuillants, leading to the dissolution of the Abondance congregation. Abbot Humbert de Mouxy undertook reconstruction work in the 1620s. The ceiling of the refectory dates from this period. The cloister was entirely rebuilt, reusing Romanesque decorative elements. The lateral chapel was repurposed for archive storage.

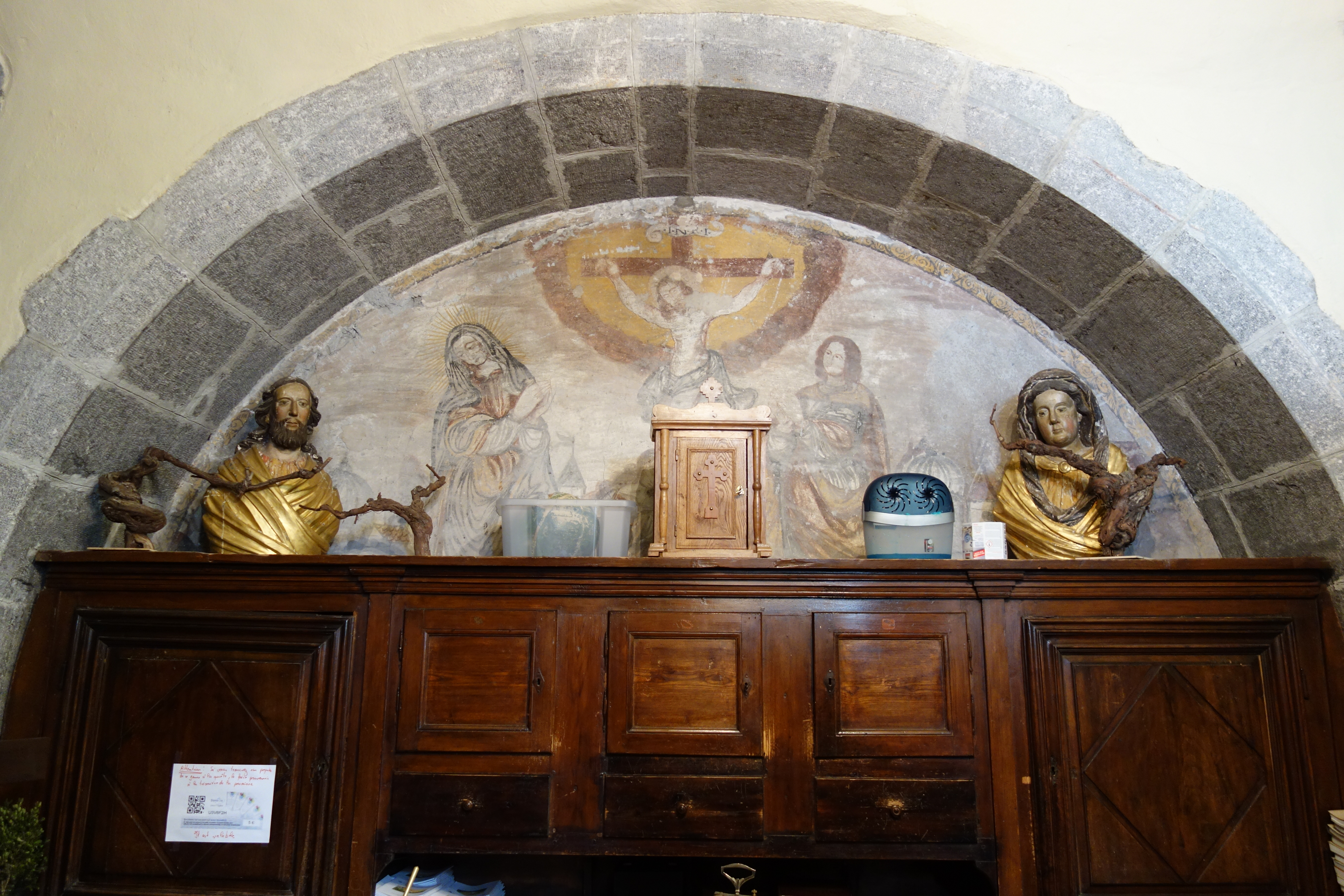
Mural painting of the Crucifixion of Christ, 18th century, in the sacristy of the Sixt-Fer-à-Cheval church.

In October 1680, a severe fire destroyed parts of the abbey, including the church’s nave, the eastern and western wings, and all the roofs. Restoration work spanned many years. The eastern wing was rebuilt with a new chapter house. A new nave was completed in 1687, and the western wing was reconstructed. The former chapel, used temporarily to house Ponce’s remains during the nave’s reconstruction, was converted into an archive room. A mural painting of the Crucifixion adorned this temporary tomb. In 1745, the abbey’s roof was entirely rebuilt.

=== Contemporary Period ===
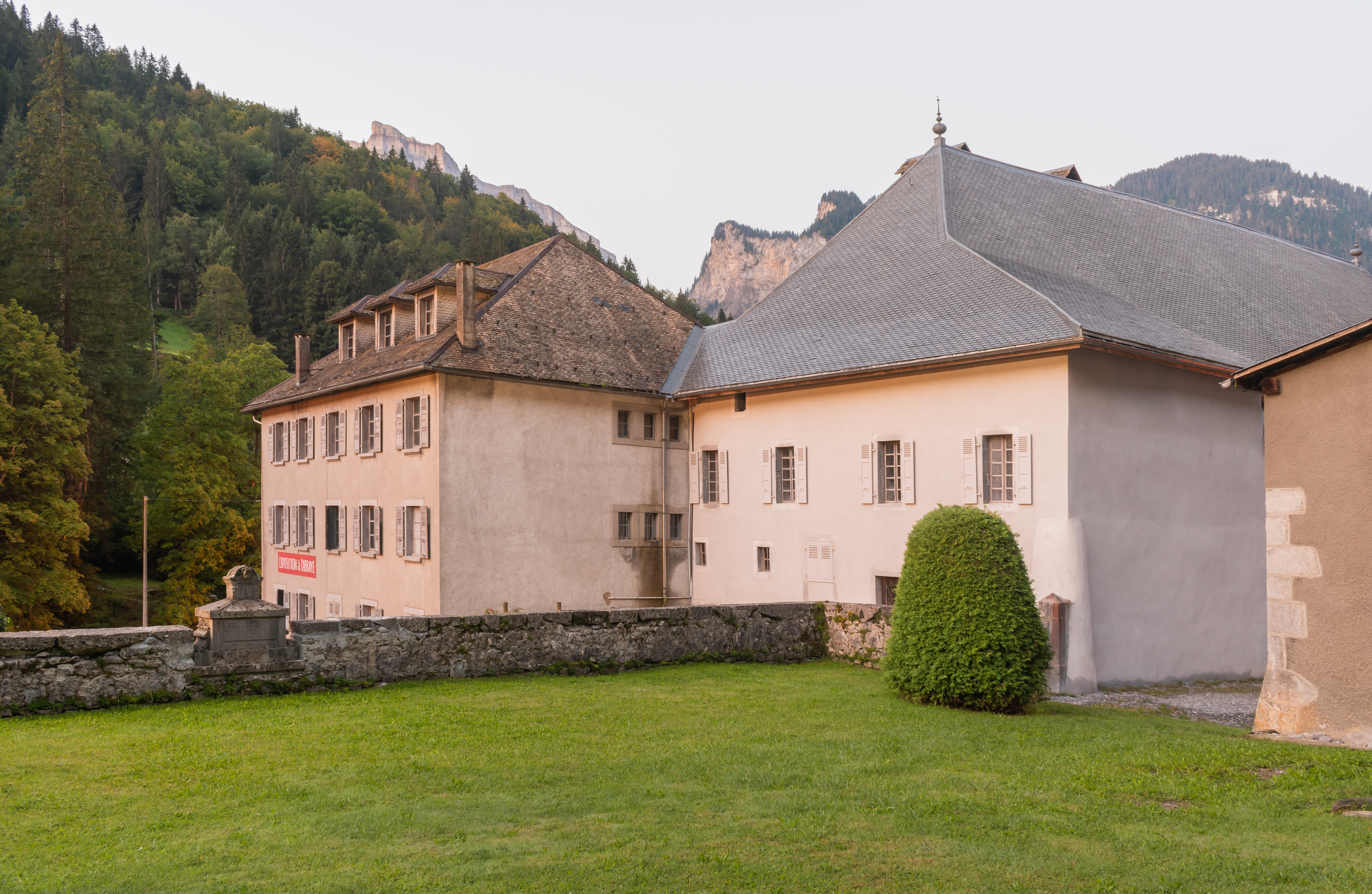
Annex of the former Fer à Cheval hotel.

The French invasion of September 1792 ended the abbey’s existence, with the canons dispersed and the properties sold as “national goods.” The former convent was converted into an inn, then a hotel until 1995, and even housed a mining operation’s headquarters from 1809 to 1853. A hotel annex was built in the early 20th century.

In 1810, Albanis Beaumont, a Savoyard engineer and geographer, died in the monastery he had acquired, according to the Dictionnaire du duché de Savoie (1840). His funerary monument remains visible in the former cemetery at the apse of the abbey church. However, the Dictionnaire historique de la Suisse lists La Vernaz as Beaumont’s place of death.

The building was listed as a historical monument in February 1997.

The abbey is currently undergoing a restoration project to transform it into a museum, environmental, and cultural site as part of the Grands Sites de France initiative. It is owned by the commune of Sixt-Fer-à-Cheval (church parcel) and the Haute-Savoie department (former convent parcel) since 2000.

== Description ==
=== Overview ===
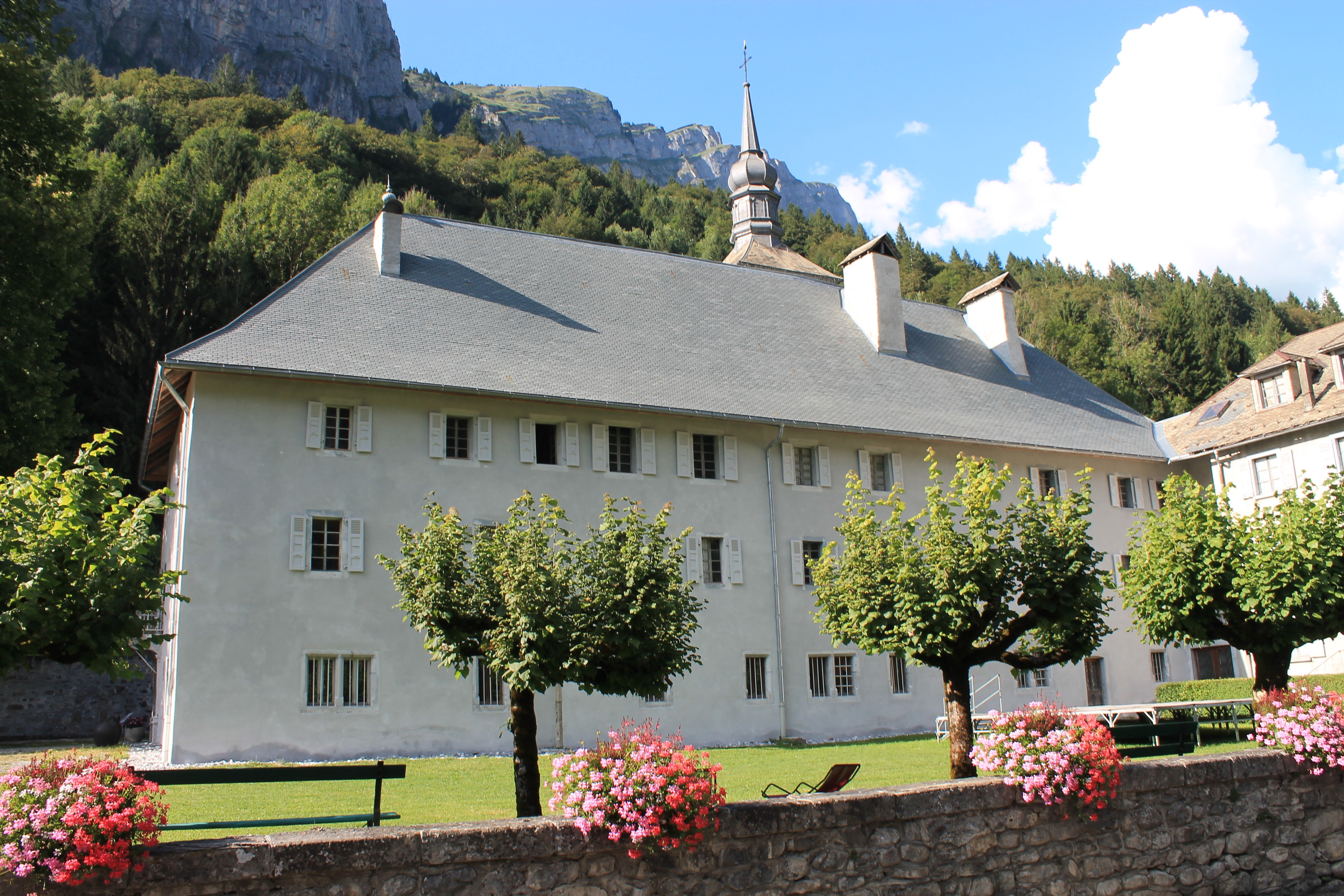
Overview of Sixt Abbey, Sixt-Fer-à-Cheval, Haute-Savoie.

The church, located at the northern end of the site, is a composite structure built between the 13th and 18th centuries. To the south, the surviving conventual buildings were constructed between the 12th and 18th centuries. To the west of the former convent are two dependencies: the current Sixt-Fer-à-Cheval presbytery and the former corner tower of the abbey’s enclosure. To the east, a traditional 19th-century wooden granary completes the complex.

=== The church ===
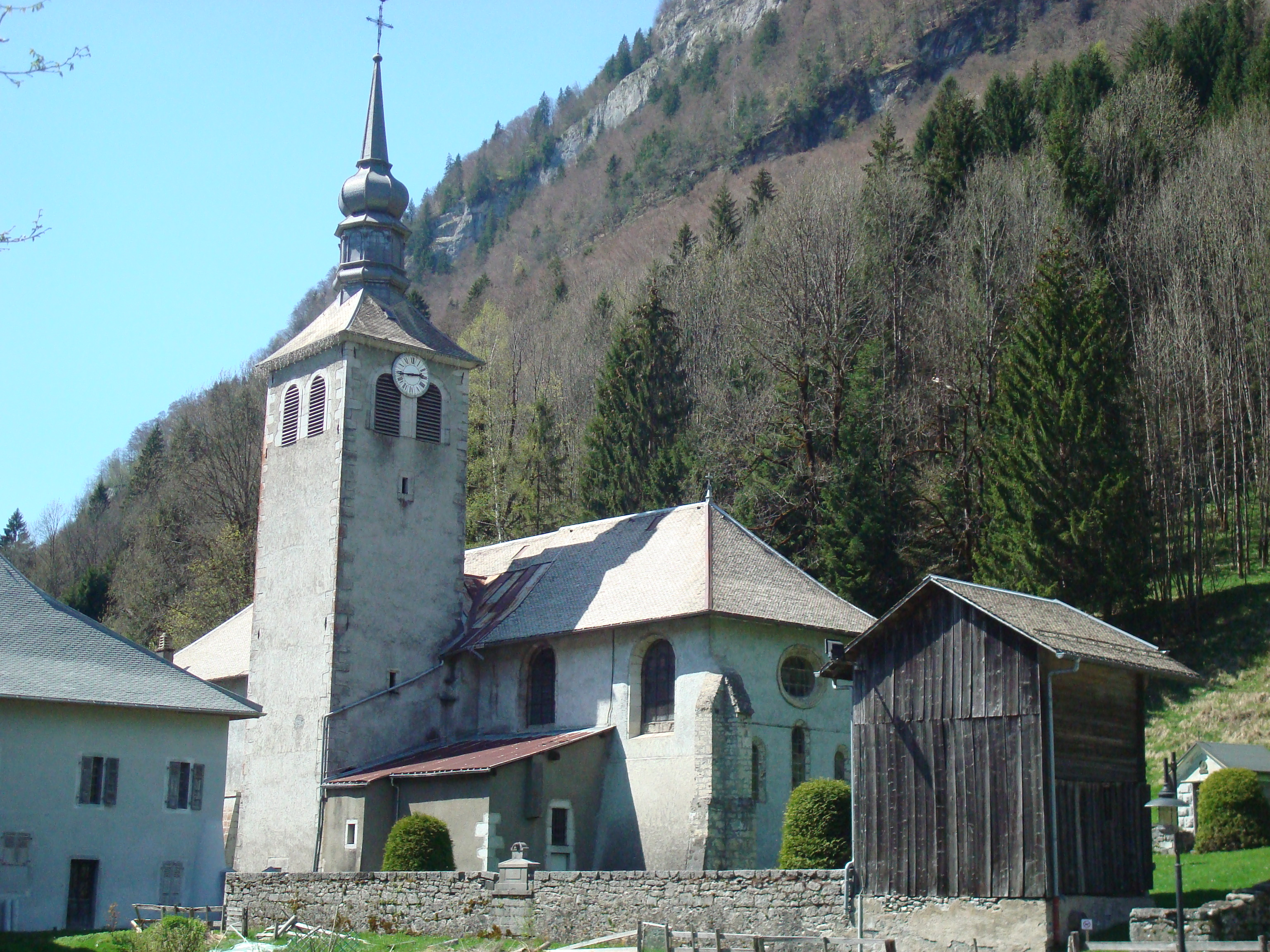
View of the Sixt-Fer-à-Cheval church from the southeast.

The former abbatial church, now a parish church, is dedicated to Saint Madeleine. It comprises a 13th-century choir, a 17th-century nave, a 19th-century onion-domed bell tower, and two early 20th-century lateral chapels. A protected treasure, listed as a historical monument, includes items from the Middle Ages and early modern period, housed in the sacristy built south of the sanctuary.

The medieval choir features four bays with ribbed vaults of tuff supported by sculpted corbels depicting human figures. The church is lit by a triplet in the chevet and two large modern windows in the southern wall. At the third eastern bay, two chapels create the appearance of a transept. The northern chapel is built on a limestone rock detached from the mountain. The modern nave consists of three bays and a gallery. The sacristy, also covered with ribbed vaults of Sixt limestone, houses the Crucifixion mural.

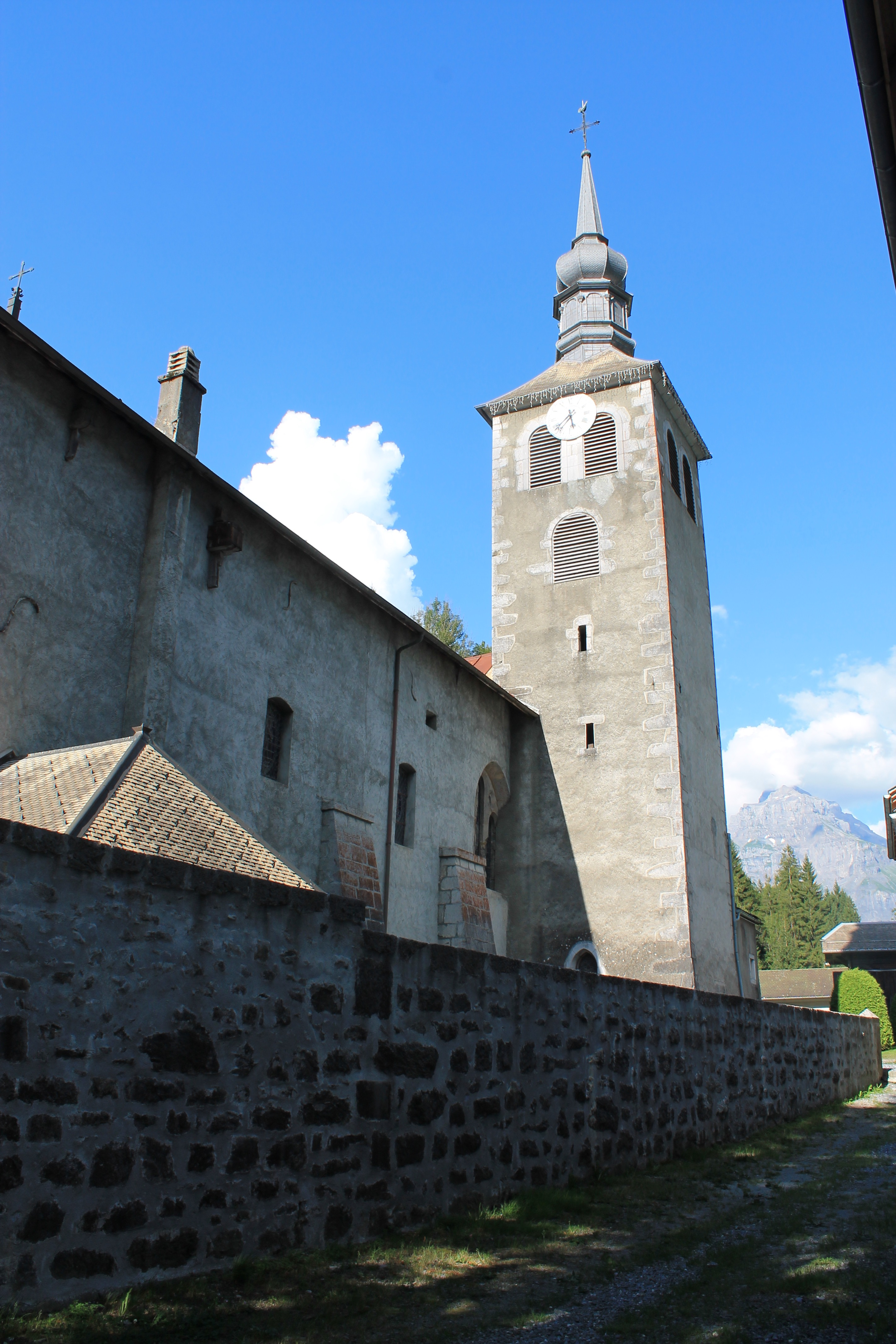
Bell tower.

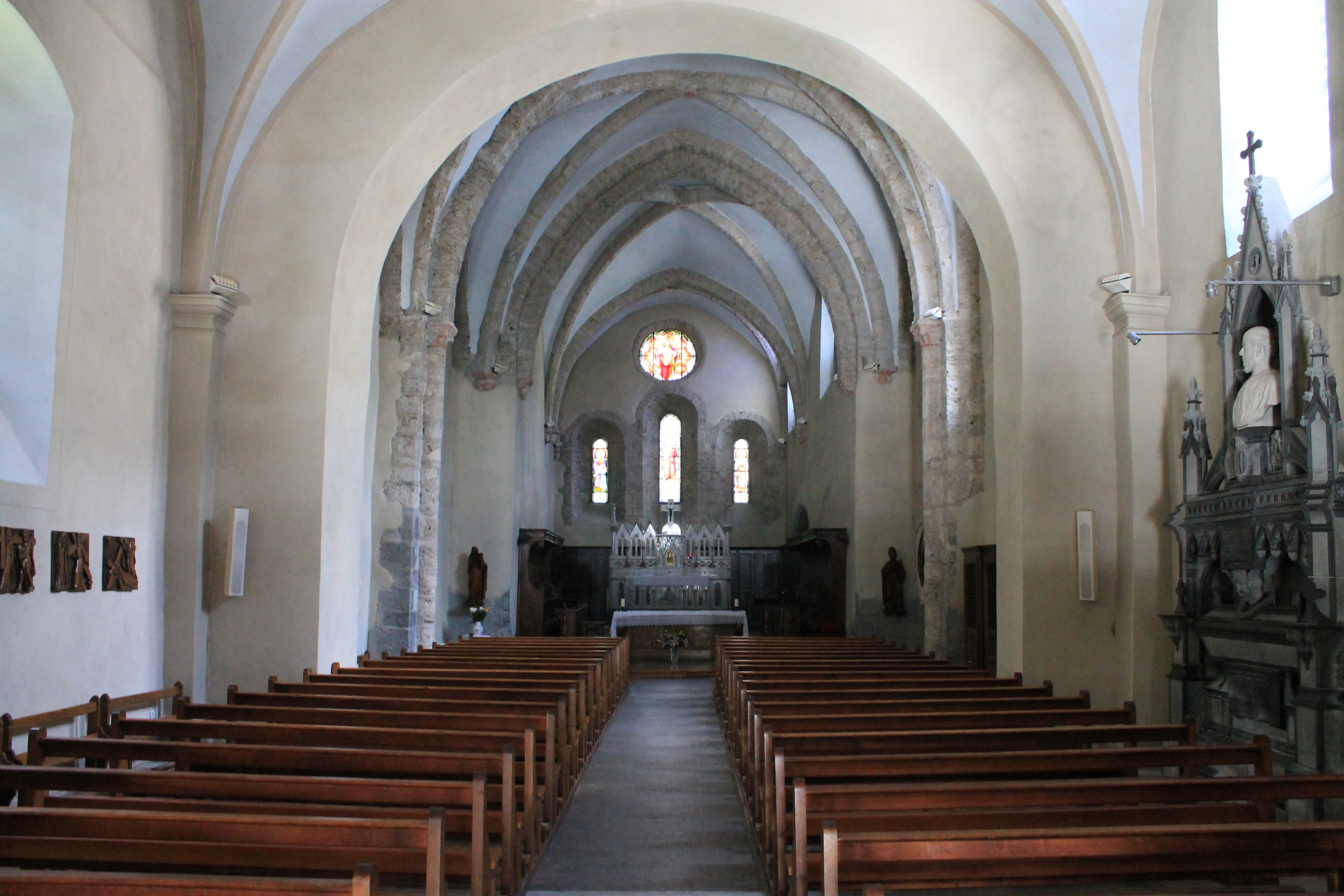
Nave.

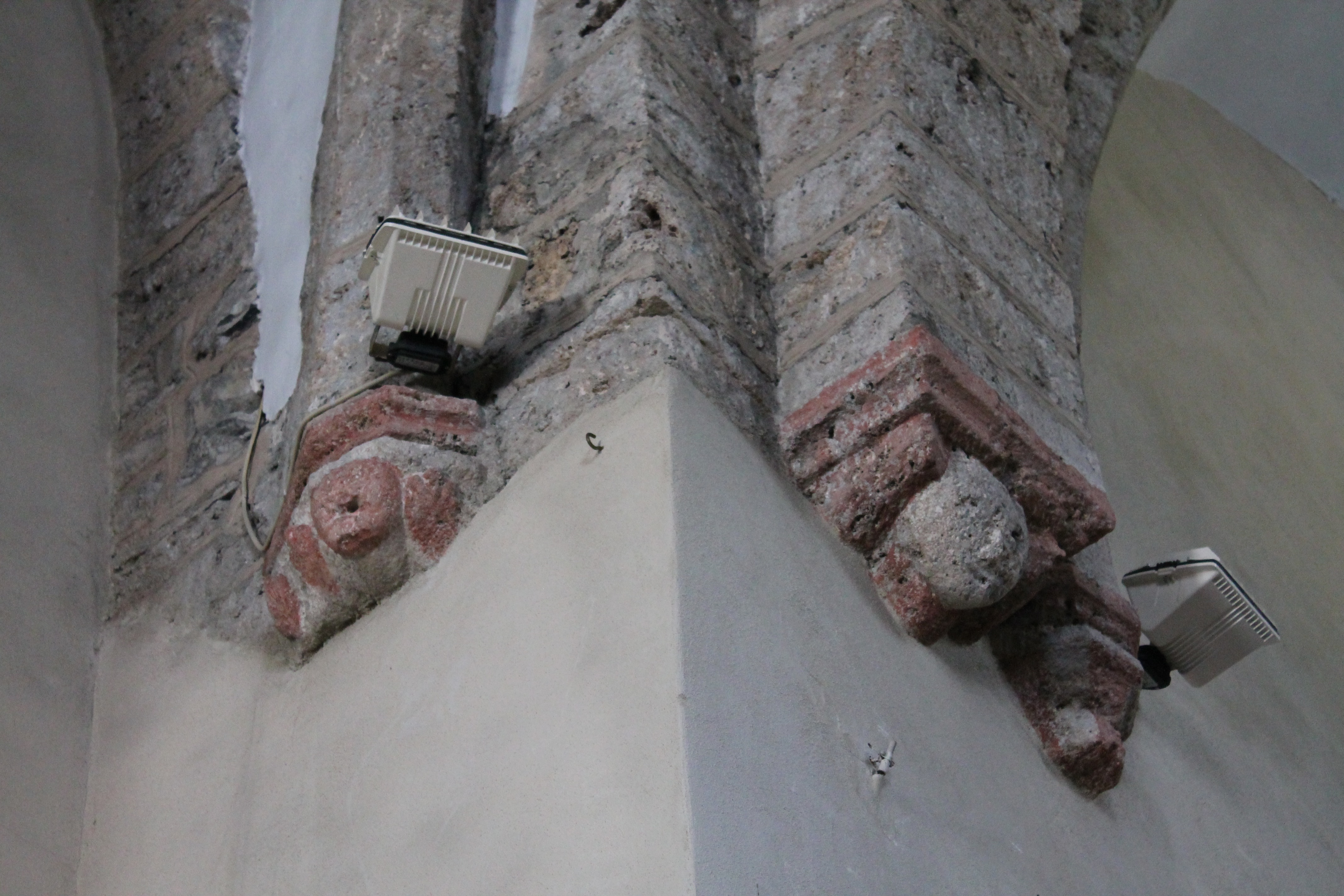
Corbels.

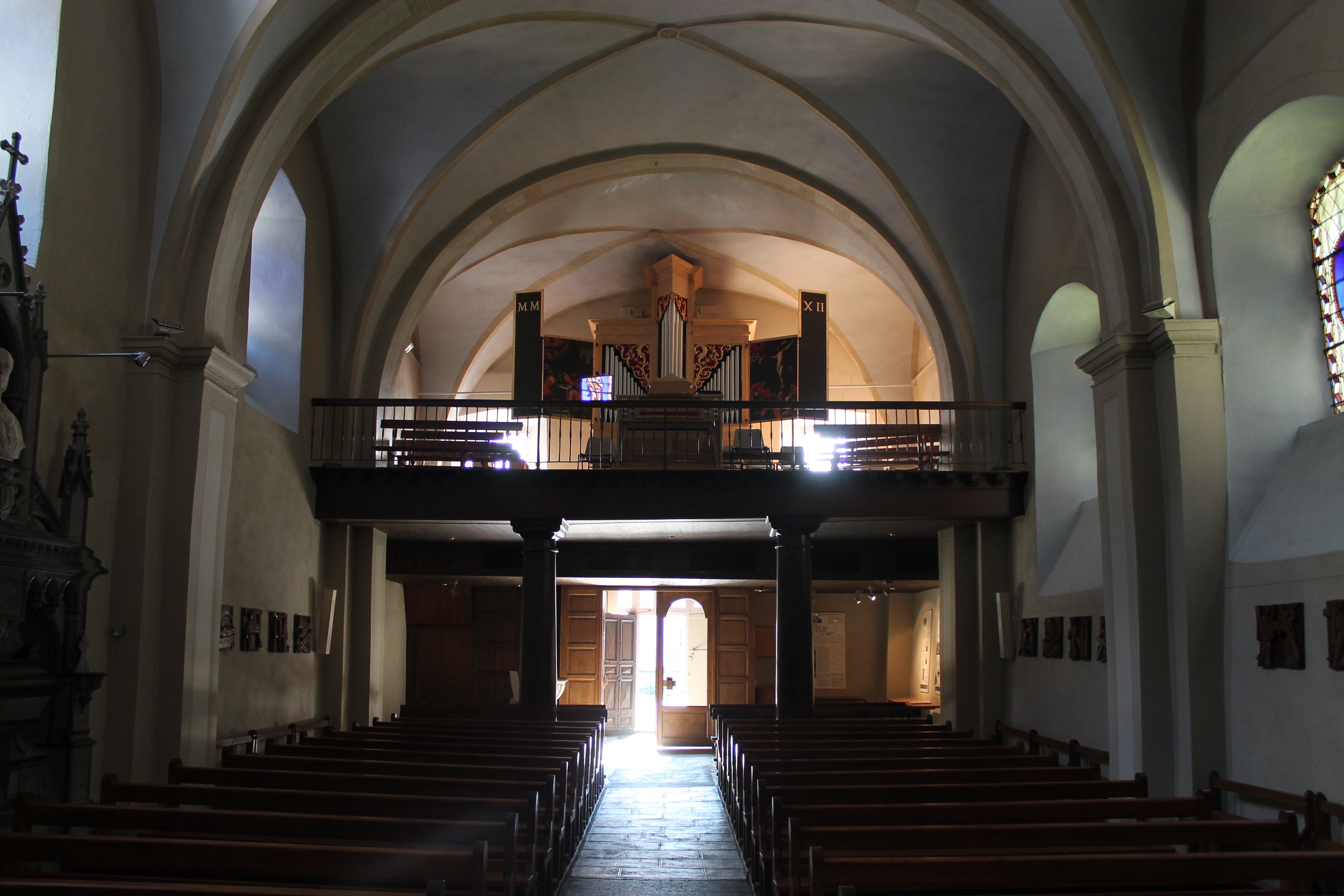
Gallery and organ.

=== The "Logis" ===
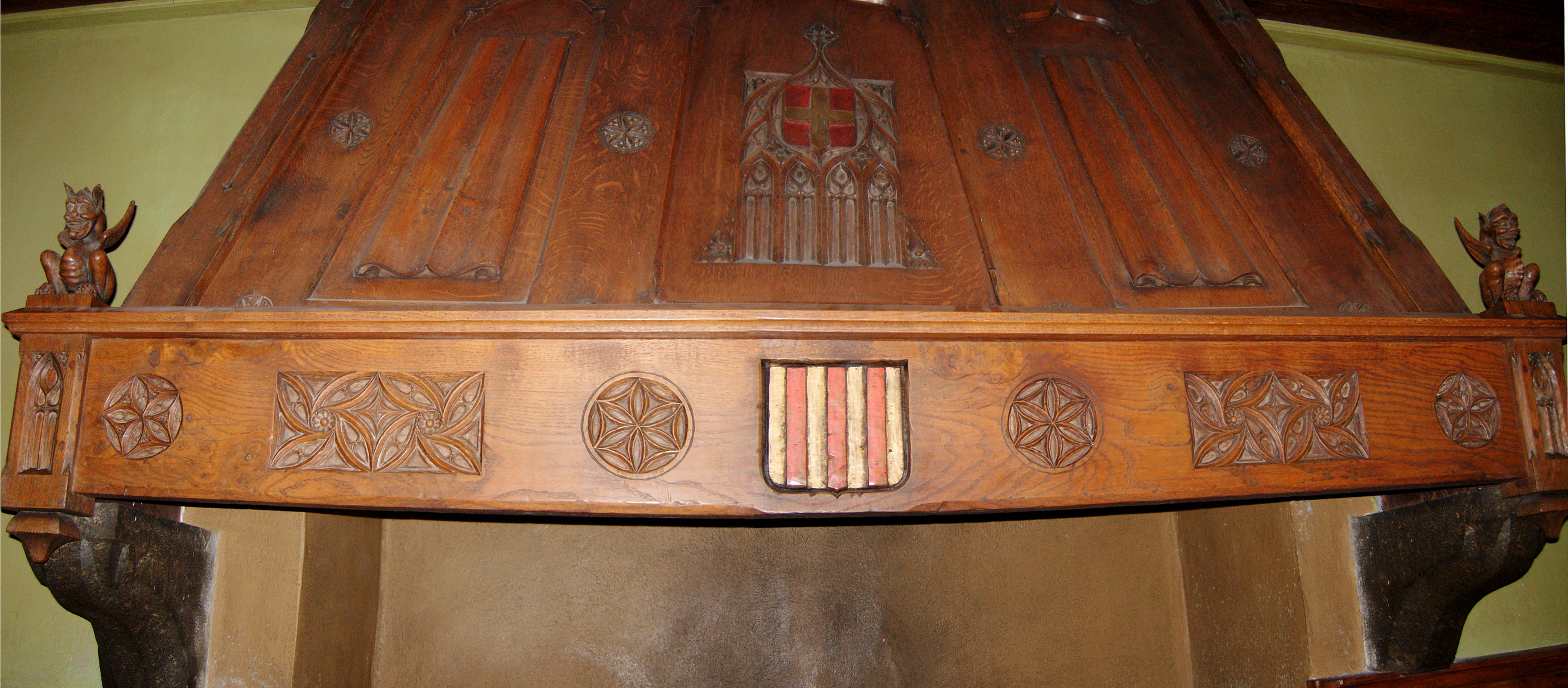
Fireplace in the refectory of Sixt Abbey, Sixt-Fer-à-Cheval.

After its acquisition by the Haute-Savoie General Council in 2000, the building known locally as the “abbatial logis,” corresponding to the southern wing of the convent, underwent archaeological investigations that revealed 17th- and 18th-century decorations, preserved despite two centuries of varied use.

The ground floor contains large rooms and kitchens, accessed via a long corridor with barrel vaults from the 17th century. The former restaurant of the Fer-à-Cheval Hotel and Abbey occupies the largest space (86 m²), possibly the former refectory, and features a remarkable ceiling with decorated beams.

The upper two floors, accessed by a grand 17th-century staircase, house the former canons’ cells, later divided into twenty hotel rooms. Beams, paneling, doors, and fireplaces from the 17th and 18th centuries allow reconstruction of the original layout, decorations, and comforts.

== Archaeological study ==
=== Preventive archaeology operations ===
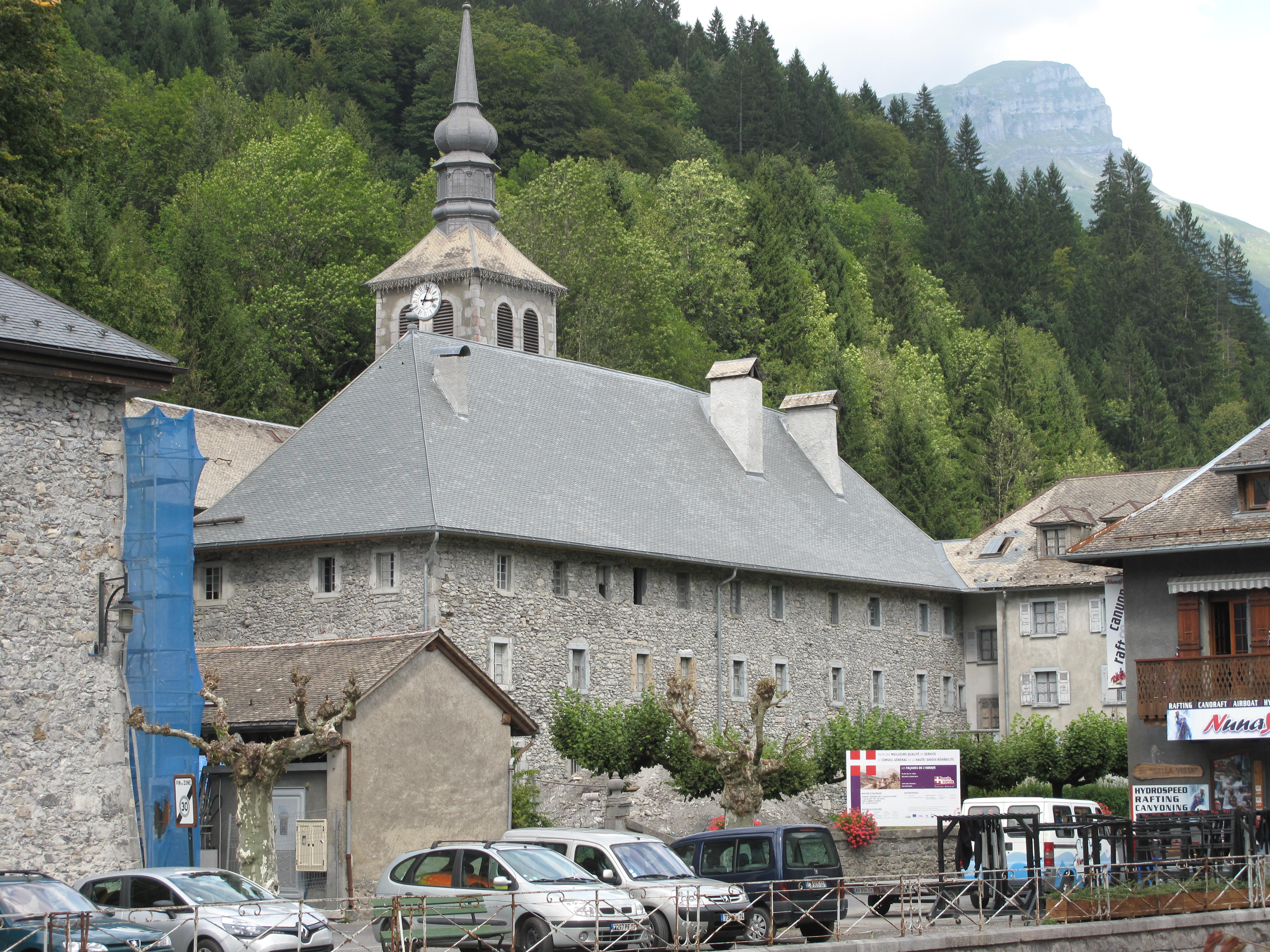
Ongoing archaeological studies of the structure.

The acquisition of the former southern convent wing by the Haute-Savoie department in 2000 prompted preventive archaeological investigations, mandated by the Regional Archaeology Service (SRA) of the former Rhône-Alpes region, ahead of roof and façade restoration and earthworks. Led by Laurent D'Agostino of the Hadès archaeological firm, these studies occurred between 2010 and spring 2014, followed by 2015. Building archaeology provided new insights into the layout of the initial 12th- and 13th-century abbey and its transformations up to the mid-20th century. Archaeologists uncovered remains of the western wing connecting the southern wing to the church. In the cloister’s courtyard and western gallery, burials were discovered, some dated to the 12th and 13th centuries by carbon-14, indicating use as a burial space from the abbey’s origins.

In 2015, archaeologist David Jouneau from the approved preventive archaeology operator Archeodunum conducted a building archaeology study in the southern wing’s corridor, corresponding to the former southern cloister gallery, refining the abbey’s construction phases.

=== Programmed archaeology operations ===
Between November 2012 and June 2013, Christophe Guffond (Haute-Savoie Departmental Council) conducted a building archaeology operation on the “Granary-School” complex, focusing on the former abbey tower. Carbon-14 dating placed the structure at the end of the Middle Ages or the early modern period.

Since 2015, Sixt Abbey has been studied as part of a doctoral dissertation in medieval history and archaeology by Sidonie Bochaton at Lumière-Lyon 2 University. Three archaeological operations took place. In June 2015, the southern side of the church’s chevet was excavated, revealing foundations of a former lateral chapel dedicated to Saint James. In 2016, the cloister and chapter house were excavated. In 2017, a test pit on the former convent parcel uncovered two domestic dependencies.

== See also ==
- Chanoines réguliers de Saint-Augustin
- Duché de Savoie
- Samoëns
- François de Sales

== Bibliography ==
- Baud, Anne; Schmitt, Anne (2019). La construction monumentale en Haute-Savoie du XIIe au XVIIIe siècle [Monumental Construction in Haute-Savoie from the 12th to 18th Century]. Documents d'Archéologie en Auvergne-Rhône-Alpes (in French). Lyon: ALPARA et MOM. p. 132.
- Besson, Joseph-Antoine (1759). Mémoires pour l'histoire ecclésiastiques des diocèses de Genève, Tarantaise, Aoste et Maurienne, et du décanat de Savoye [Memoirs for the Ecclesiastical History of the Dioceses of Geneva, Tarantaise, Aosta, and Maurienne, and the Deanery of Savoy] (in French). Nancy: S. Henault. p. 506.
- Binz, Louis; Piguet, Martine; Coram-Mekkey, Sandra (2006). Les visites pastorales du diocèse de Genève par l'évêque Jean de Bertrand (1411-1414) [Pastoral Visits of the Diocese of Geneva by Bishop Jean de Bertrand (1411-1414)] (in French). Annecy: Académie salésienne. p. 724. ISBN 9782901102229. ISSN 1958-9700.
- Bochaton, Sidonie (2023a). L'abbaye de Sixt. Des chanoines réguliers en Faucigny (XIIe au XIXe) [Sixt Abbey: Regular Canons in Faucigny (12th to 19th Century)] (in French). Annecy: Académie salésienne. p. 384.
- Bochaton, Sidonie (2023b). "Lieux de justice de chanoines réguliers en Haute-Savoie. Les congrégations d'Abondance et du Mont-Joux" [Places of Justice of Regular Canons in Haute-Savoie: The Congregations of Abondance and Mont-Joux]. Actes du colloque quadriennal du CERCOR Communautés religieuses, société et justice (in French): 297–314.
- Bochaton, Sidonie (2022). "La nef et le choeur. A propos des églises de l'abbaye de Sixt" [The Nave and the Choir: On the Churches of Sixt Abbey]. De cols en vallées. Parcours en Faucigny médiéval et moderne (in French). 1: 111–123.
- Bochaton, Sidonie (2021). Les chanoines réguliers en Savoie du Nord. Restitution des abbayes d'Abondance et de Sixt (XIIe - XVIIe) [Regular Canons in Northern Savoy: Reconstruction of the Abbeys of Abondance and Sixt (12th to 17th Century)] (Thesis) (in French). Lyon: Université Lumière.
- Bochaton, Sidonie (2019). "Maisons canoniales en Savoie du Nord. Les congrégations du Grand-Saint-Bernard et d'Abondance" [Canonical Houses in Northern Savoy: The Congregations of Grand-Saint-Bernard and Abondance]. Les monastères de chanoines réguliers en France (XIIe-XVIIIe) (in French). 32. CAHMER: 171–185.
- Bochaton, Sidonie; Jouneau, David (2018). "L'abbaye de Sixt à travers le temps. Résultats des campagnes archéologiques 2015 et 2016" [Sixt Abbey Through Time: Results of the 2015 and 2016 Archaeological Campaigns] (PDF). Les Dossiers du musée savoisien (in French).
- Bochaton, Sidonie; Guffond, Christophe; Jouneau, David (2017). "L'abbaye de Sixt. Une histoire architecturale tourmentée" [Sixt Abbey: A Troubled Architectural History]. Domestiquer Un Bout du Monde... (in French): 24–47.
- Carrier, Nicolas (2001). La vie montagnarde en Faucigny à la fin du Moyen Âge [Mountain Life in Faucigny at the End of the Middle Ages]. Logiques historiques (in French). L'Harmattan. p. 620. ISBN 978-2-7475-1592-4. ISSN 1625-3329.
- Carrier, Nicolas (2003). "Les moines et la montagne en Savoie du Nord (XIe-XVe)" [Monks and the Mountain in Northern Savoy (11th-15th Century)]. Actes des congrès de la Société des historiens médiévistes de l'enseignement supérieur public (in French). 34: 221–239.
- Delerce, Arnaud (2019). L'abbaye d'Abondance et sa congrégation: D'après la reconstitution du chartrier canonial (1108-1300) [Abondance Abbey and Its Congregation: Based on the Reconstruction of the Canonical Chartulary (1108-1300)]. Sociétés, religion, politique (in French). Université Savoie Mont Blanc.
- Delerce, Arnaud (2017). Focus Abondance: Une abbaye à la lumière de ses parchemins retrouvés [Focus Abondance: An Abbey in the Light of Its Rediscovered Parchments] (in French). Communauté de communes Pays d'Évian Vallée d'Abondance.
- Gavard, Adrien (1911). "Les archives de l'abbaye de Sixt avant la Révolution" [The Archives of Sixt Abbey Before the Revolution]. Mémoires & Documents (in French). Académie salésienne.
- Guffond, Christophe (2017). Domestiquer un bout du monde… Vivre dans les montagnes de Sixt XIIe-XXIe [Taming a Piece of the World: Living in the Sixt Mountains 12th-21st Century]. Culture 74 (in French). Annecy: Conseil départemental de la Haute-Savoie.
- Lullin, Paul; Le Fort, Charles (1866). Régeste genevois: Répertoire chronologique et analytique des documents imprimés relatifs à l'histoire de la ville et du diocèse de Genève avant l'année 1312 [Geneva Register: Chronological and Analytical Repertory of Printed Documents Related to the History of the City and Diocese of Geneva Before 1312] (in French). Société d'histoire et d'archéologie de Genève.
- Oursel, Raymond (2008). Les chemins du sacré: L'art sacré en Savoie [The Paths of the Sacred: Sacred Art in Savoy]. Les Savoisiennes (in French). Vol. 1. La Fontaine de Siloé. pp. 133–134. ISBN 978-2-8420-6350-4.
- Rannaud, Marie (1905). Le Bienheureux Ponce de Faucigny, fondateur de l'abbaye de Sixt: sa vie, son culte [The Blessed Ponce de Faucigny, Founder of Sixt Abbey: His Life, His Cult] (in French). Comité paroissial. p. 427.
