= CEN Réseau de la Haute-Savoie =

Railway line in France

Annemasse-Samoëns-Sixt-Fer-à-Cheval
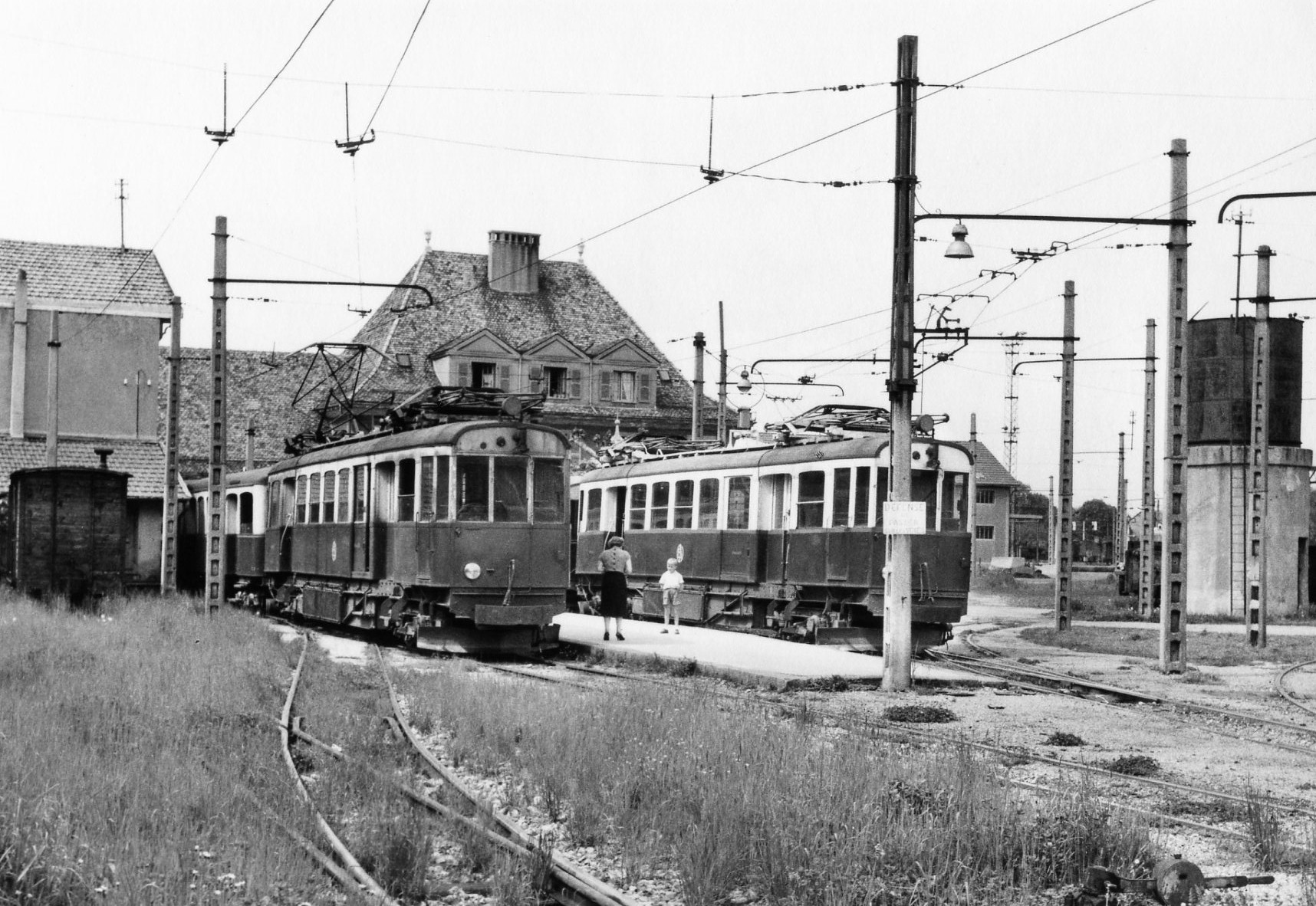
- The CEN Réseau de la Haute-Savoie tramway terminus at Annemasse in 1955

Overview
- Owner: Chemins de fer économiques du Nord
- Termini: Annemasse; Samoëns 1891-1932 Sixt-Fer-à-Cheval 1932-1959

History
- Opened: 15 July 1891
- Closed: 15 May 1959

Technical
- Track gauge: 1,000 mm (3 ft 3 3/8 in) metre gauge
- Electrification: 1500V DC (1932-1959)

The Réseau de la Haute-Savoie was a tramway line in the Auvergne-Rhône-Alpes region of France from 1891 to 1959. It ran from Annemasse to Samoëns and Sixt-Fer-à-Cheval with branches to Bonneville and Marignier.

== History ==
A 44 kilometres (27 mi) tramway from Annemasse to Samoëns operated by CEN Réseau de la Haute-Savoie started services in 1891. There were two branches:

- Bonne to Bonneville 13 kilometres (8.1 mi)
- Pont du Risse to Marignier 7 kilometres (4.3 mi)

The line between Annemasse and Saint-Jeoire was opened for passenger services on 15 July 1891 with a service of four trains per day and a journey time of 1 hour 20 minutes. The full line to Samoens opened a few months later.

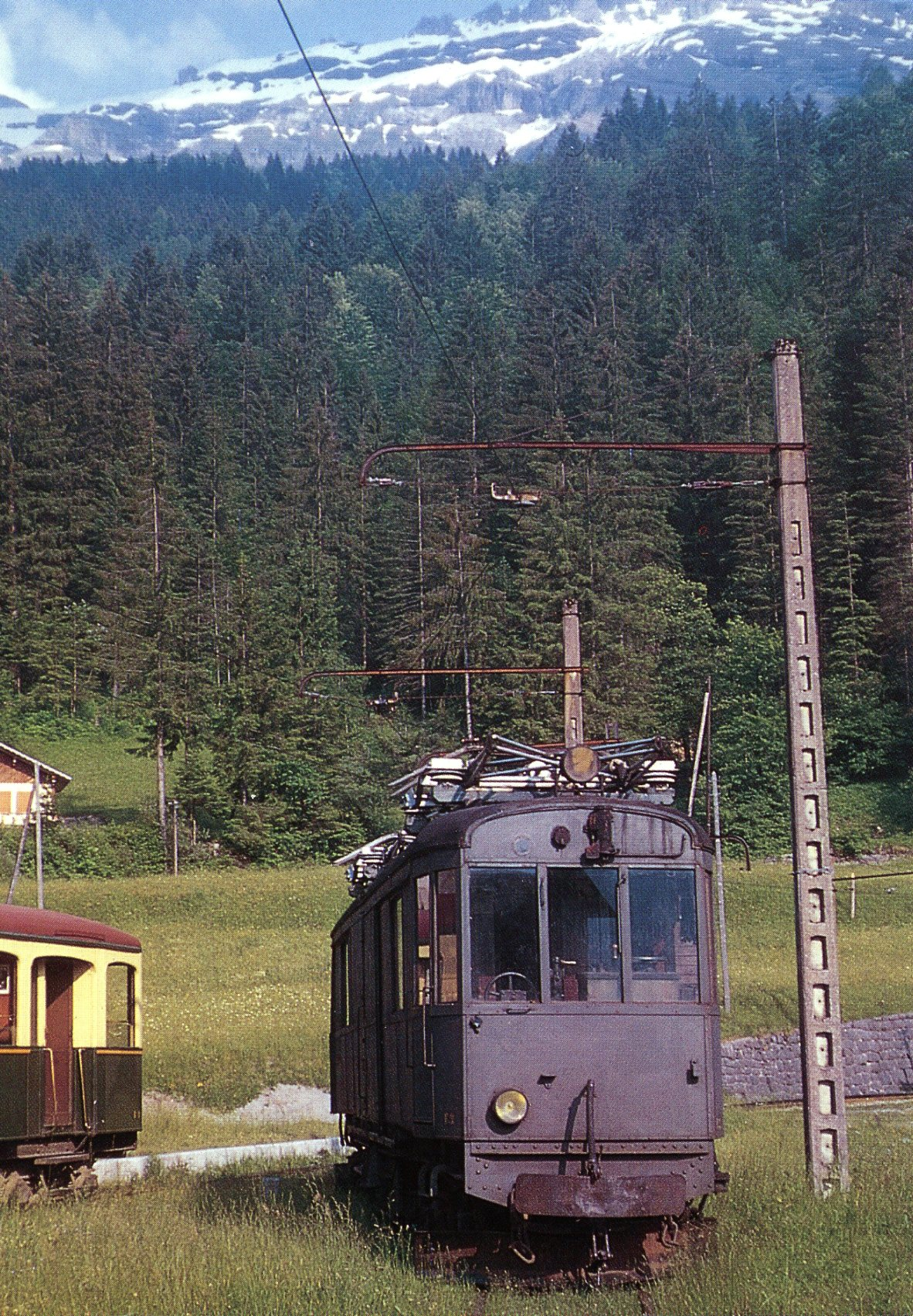
Trains at Sixt-Fer-à-Cheval in 1958

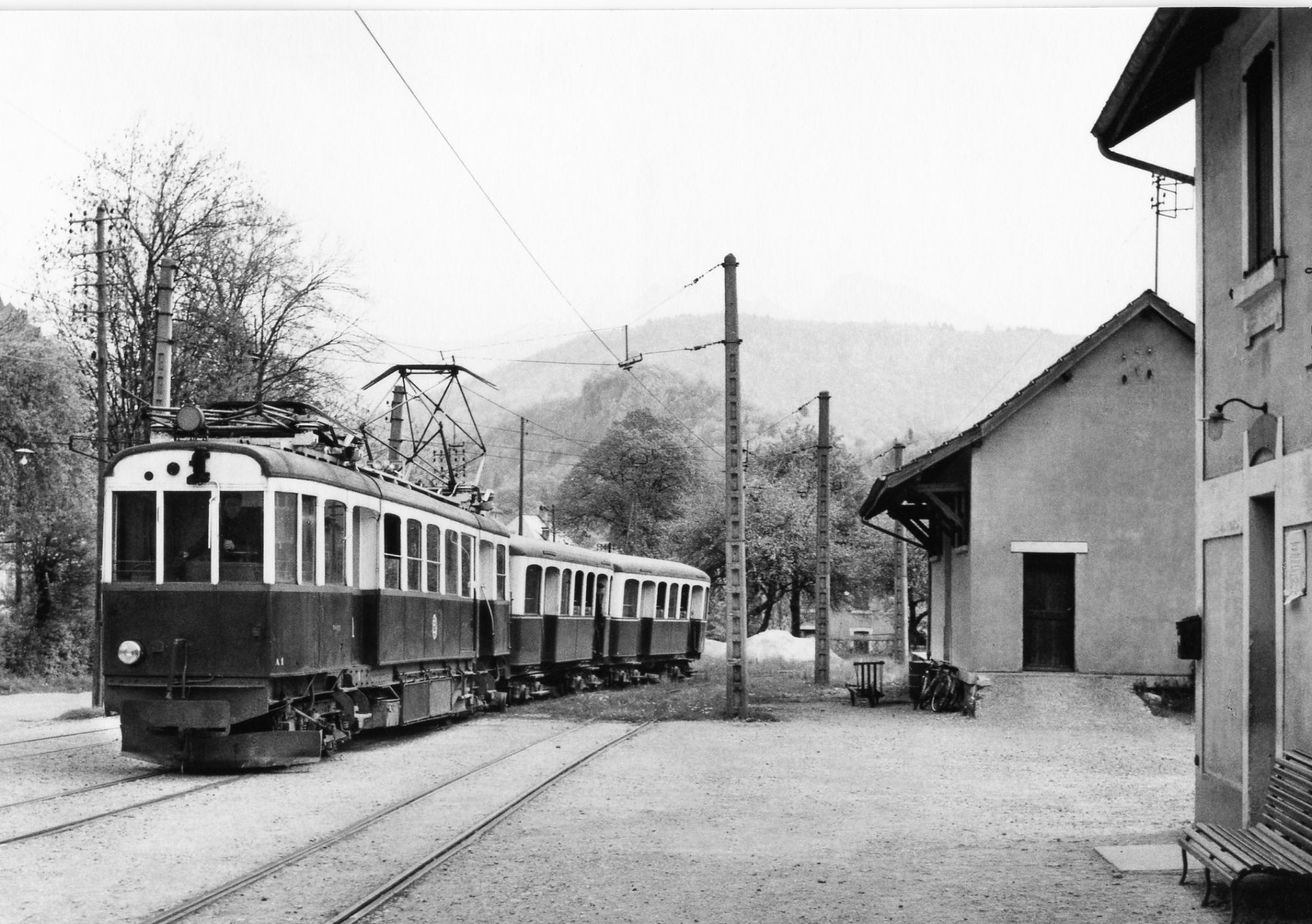
A train at Saint-Jeoire in 1959

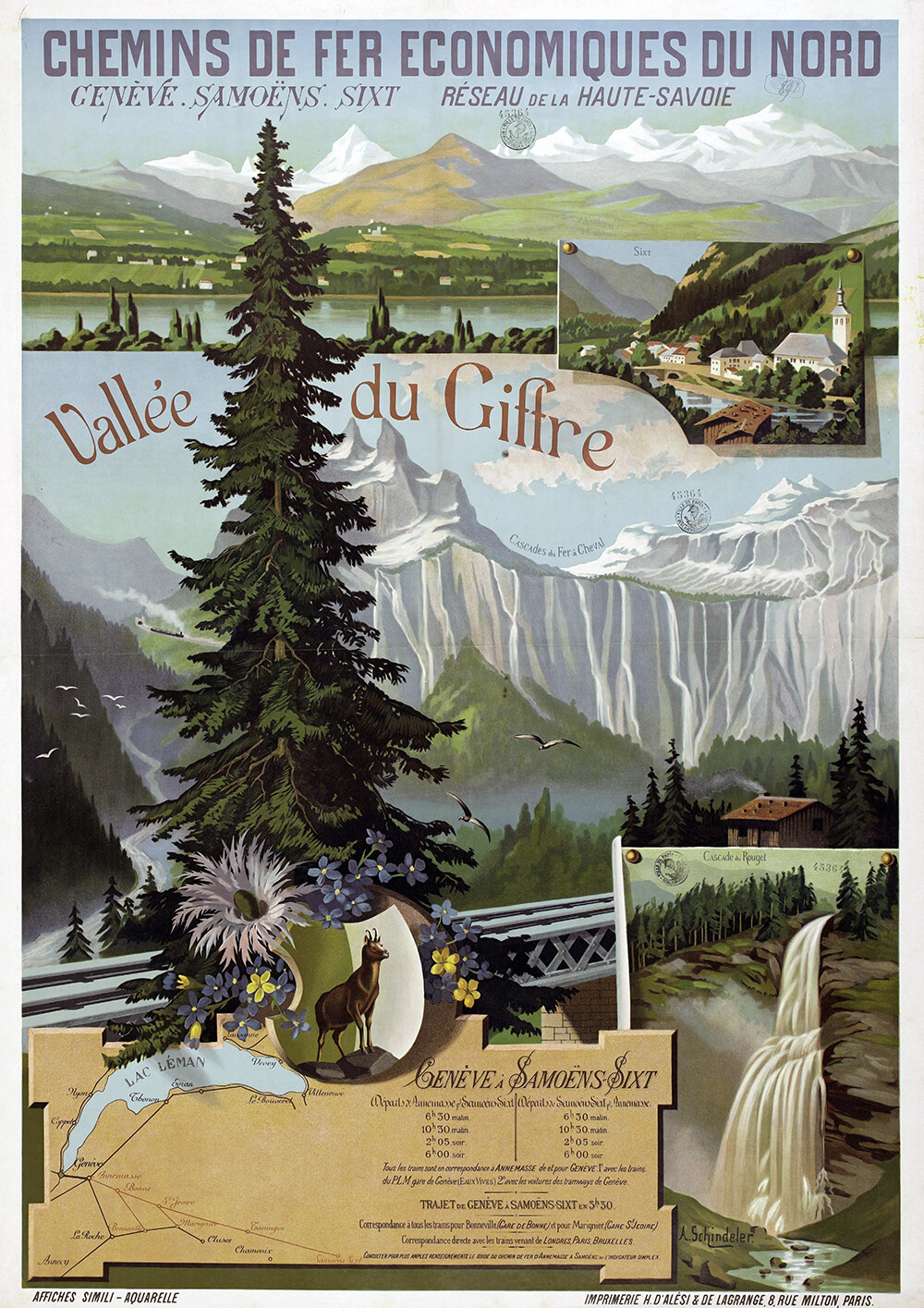
Advert from the 1930s

The service was operated using steam tramway engines. The tramway company operated the services with a fleet of eight steam locomotives, 22 passenger cars and 77 wagons.

In 1896 the annual meeting of the Chemins de fer économiques du Nord reported the following information about the operation of the service.

Length: 63 km. Operating revenues, which stood at 206,803.90 francs in 1894, reached 210,658.59 francs in 1895—an increase of 3,843.31 francs over the 1894 fiscal year. The number of passengers transported was 232,177.

In 1913 the tramway carried 306,000 passengers and 60,000 tons of goods.

The branch between Bonne and Bonneville was abandoned in 1928.

On 24 August 1932 a 6 kilometres (3.7 mi) extension to Sixt-Fer-à-Cheval was opened and at the same time the whole line was converted to electric traction.

The branch from Pont du Risse to Marignier was not electrified and passenger services were withdrawn in 1933, followed by the withdrawal of freight services in 1946.

At its peak in 1951 the railway carried 480,000 passengers and 7,000 tones of freight.

The remaining services were withdrawn on 15 May 1959.

== Steam locomotives ==
- Numbers 35 to 39, 030T Twin cabin tramway engine, delivered in 1891 by the Ateliers de construction du Nord de la France (ANF) of Blanc-Misseron
- Number 40, 030T Twin cabin tramway engine, delivered in 1894 by the Société franco-belge de matériel de chemins de fer.

== Timetable in 1959 ==
Annemasse	Saint-Jeoire	Samoëns	Sixt	Notes
07.30		09.09	09.20	Except Saturdays, Sundays and holidays
08.20		10.01	10.12	Daily
10.32		12.11	12.22	Sundays and Holidays
12.15		13.56	14.07	Daily
14.24		16.03	16.14	Saturdays, Sundays and Holidays
16.34		18.15	18.26	Except Saturdays, Sundays and Holidays
18.18		19.59	20.10	Daily
19.24		19.59	20.10	Sundays and Holidays
20.10	20.56			Sundays and Holidays. Terminates at Saint-Jeoire

Sixt	Samoëns	Saint-Jeoire	Annemasse	Notes
		05.29	06.15	Except Sundays and Holidays
		06.14	07.00	Sundays and Holidays
05.46	05.59		07.43	Except Sundays and Holidays
06.09	06.20		07.54	Sundays and Holidays
06.58	07.10		08.47	Except Sundays and Holidays
08.01	08.12		09.48	Sundays and Holidays
12.00	12.11		13.49	Daily
16.19	16.30		18.08	Daily
17.00	17.11		18.49	Sundays and Holidays
17.21	17.32		19.10	Saturdays, Sundays and Holidays
17.36	17.47		19.25	Except Saturdays, Sundays and Holidays
18.07	18.18		19.56	Sundays and Holidays
