= Sixt-Fer-à-Cheval =

Sixt-Fer-à-Cheval Hi (Savoyard)
- Commune
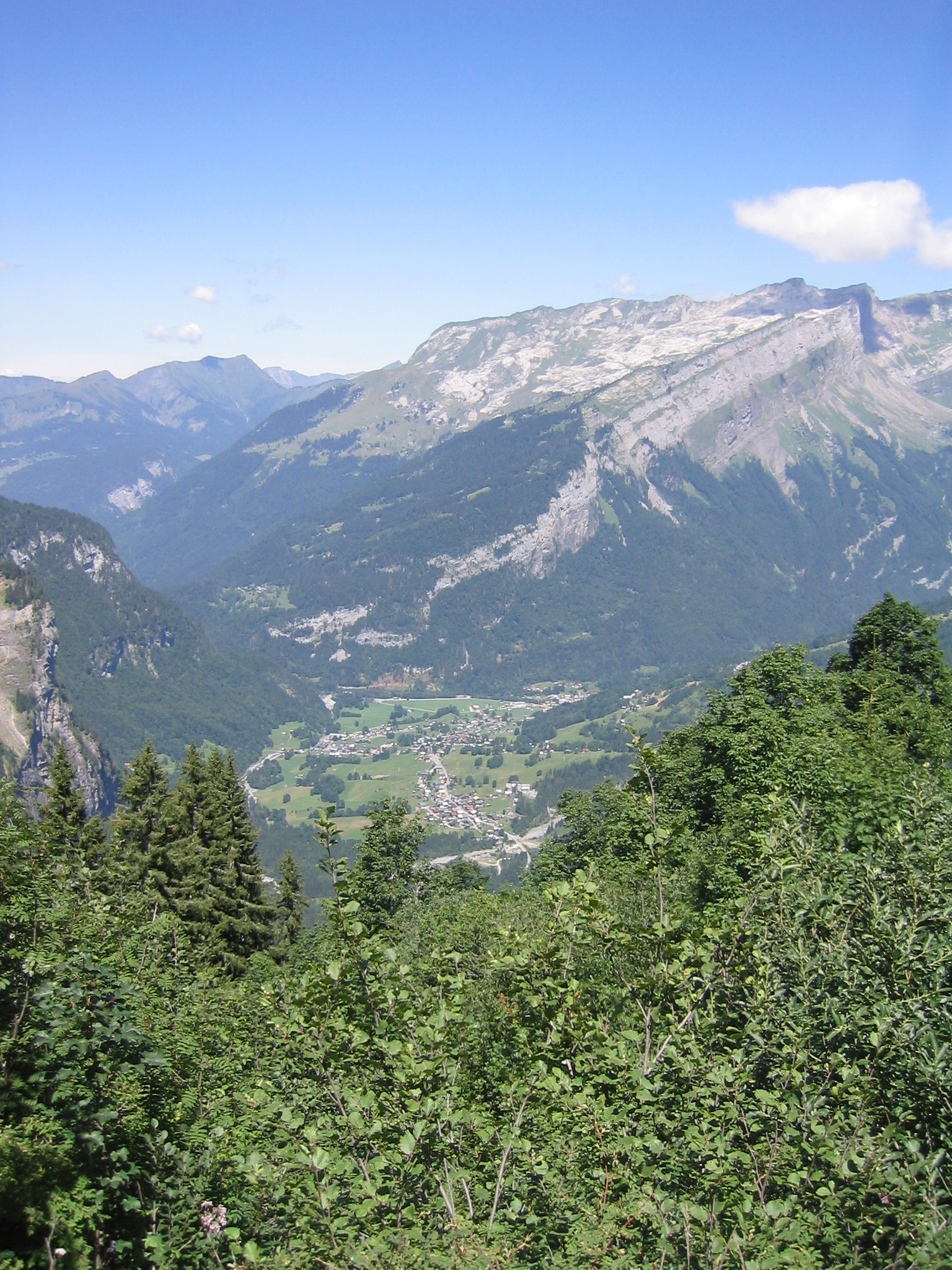
- Aerial view of Sixt-Fer-à-Cheval

- Coat of arms
- Location of Sixt-Fer-à-Cheval
- Location within France Location within Auvergne-Rhône-Alpes
- Coordinates: 46°03′21″N 6°46′35″E
- Country: France
- Region: Auvergne-Rhône-Alpes
- Department: Haute-Savoie
- Arrondissement: Bonneville
- Canton: Cluses

Government
  - Mayor (2020–2026): Stéphane Bouvet
- Area^{1}: 119.07 km^{2} (45.97 sq mi)
- Highest elevation: 3,099 m (10,167 ft)
- Lowest elevation: 728 m (2,388 ft)
- Population (2023): 736
  - Density: 6.18/km^{2} (16.0/sq mi)
- Time zone: UTC+01:00 (CET)
  - Summer (DST): UTC+02:00 (CEST)
- INSEE/Postal code: 74273 /74740
- Website: www.sixtferacheval.com
- ^{1} French Land Register data, which excludes lakes, ponds, glaciers > 1 km^{2} (0.386 sq mi or 247 acres) and river estuaries.

Sixt-Fer-à-Cheval (French pronunciation: [sikst fɛʁ a ʃ(ə)val]; Savoyard: Hi) is a commune in the Haute-Savoie department within the Auvergne-Rhône-Alpes region in southeastern France. It is located at the end of the Giffre Valley.

Sixt-Fer-à-Cheval is one of Les Plus Beaux Villages de France. Although the Cirque du Fer à Cheval has made Sixt famous, other attractions including the Cascade du Rouget waterfall, named "Queen of the Alps" and a nature reserve cover most of the district's geographical area. Its architectural heritage includes the priory and church stemming from the former Sixt Abbey, founded by Ponce de Faucigny.

== Geography ==
The area of the town ranges in altitude from 728 to 3,098 metres (2,388 to 10,164 ft); three-quarters of its area (9,200 hectares out of 11,200 total) are part of a natural reserve and completely uninhabited.

The name Sixt-Fer-à-Cheval comes from the shape of the natural amphitheatre ("Cirque du Fer à Cheval") which, from above, looks like a horseshoe. Located in the Natural Reserve of Sixt, the Cirque du Fer à Cheval, classified a Grand Site de France is a destination for approximately 500,000 visitors each year.

The heart of the village is the parish of the Abbaye. Sixt is divided into 12 parishes, along the two main rivers called Giffre des Fonts also called "Giffre-Haut" (Upper Giffre), and Giffre du Fer à Cheval. The Giffre river, a tributary of the Arve, has its source in Sixt-Fer-à-Cheval, coming from a few hundred waterfalls in the nearby mountains.

Four of the twelve parishes are located between the parish of the Abbaye and the Cirque du Fer à Cheval (Les Curtets, L'Echarny, Le Molliet, Nambride). The seven other parishes are located between the parish of the Abbaye and the Rouget Waterfall, in the upper Giffre valley (Maison Neuve, Salvagny, Passy, Le Fay, Hauterive, La Chapelle, and Englène). Sixt-Fer-à-Cheval is linked to the Samoëns' valley through one sole road.

The highest mountain in the village, the Mont Buet (also called "Women's Mont Blanc") reaches 3,099 metres (10,167 ft). Sixt shares borders with Switzerland (on the northeast) and also Chamonix-Mont-Blanc (to the south). The village and its 11,200 hectares (28,000 acres) is recognized as one of Les Plus Beaux Villages de France (The Most Beautiful Villages of France), of which there are only five in all of the French Alps.

== Mountain sports ==
Sixt is a year-round destination for adventurers, walkers, skiers and mountain bikers. There are trails and paths among alpine meadows, forests and waterfalls, including the Cascade du Rouget, "Queen of the Alps” waterfall, a 40-minute walk from the village.

Sixt-Fer-à-Cheval is a winter sports resort. Part of the Grand-Massif ski resort, Sixt is a destination for skiers and proponents of other forms of alpine activities (paragliding, via ferrata, mountaineering, ice-climbing, and rafting).

A ski area which enables families of all abilities to access the 265 km of slopes of the Grand Massif resort (Sixt-Samoëns-Flaine-Les Carroz) – from beginner slopes to blue, red, black and off-piste. Sixt owns one of the longest ski slopes of the Alps, which can be accessed from the Grande Platières summit above Flaine. This 14 km "Piste des Cascades" all the way down to Sixt, 1,700 metres (5,600 ft) below, is a gentle blue run through meadows, iced waterfalls and forests, where it is possible to see chamois and alpine ibex.

== Transport ==
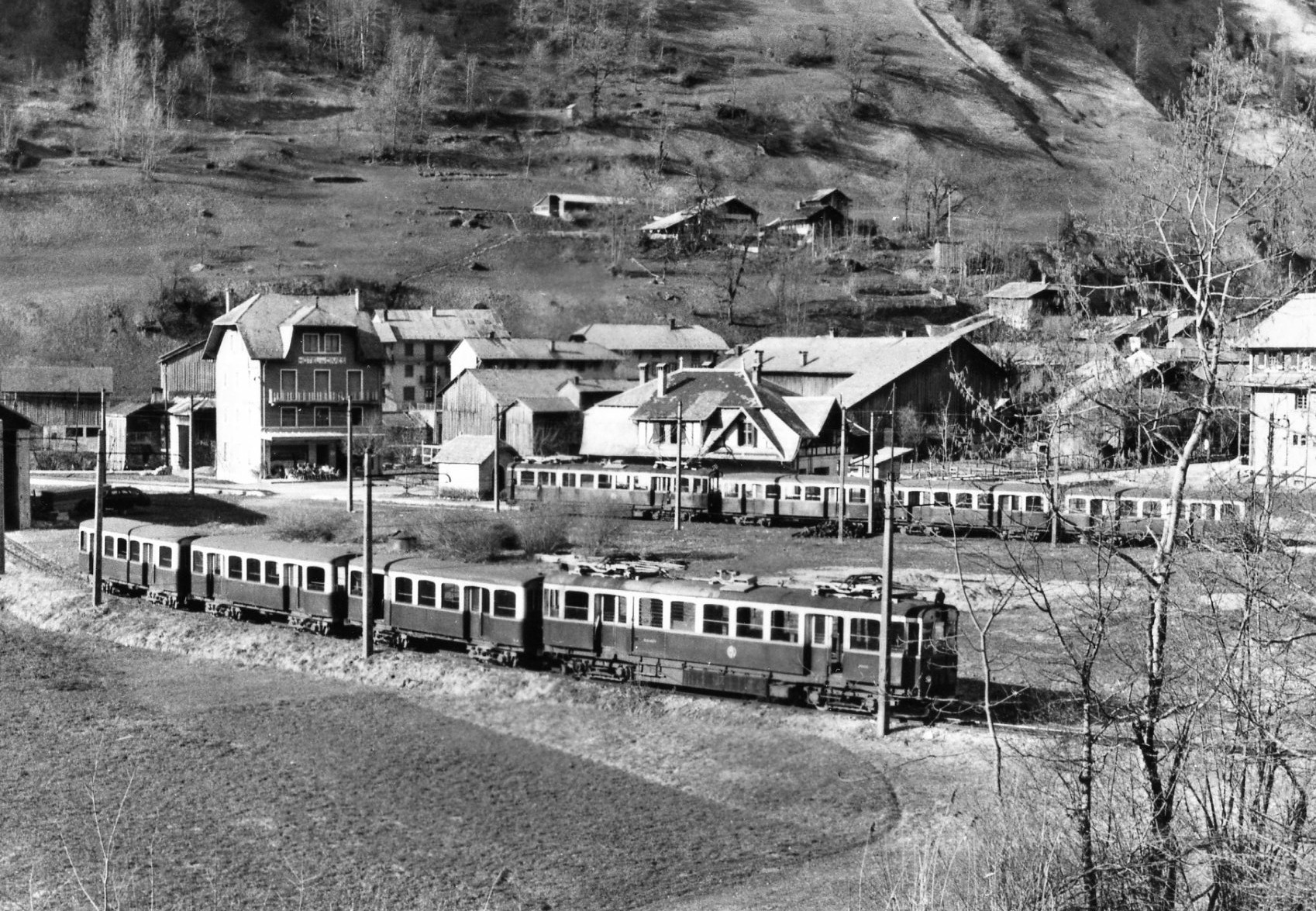
The station at Sixt in 1955

The 44 kilometres (27 mi) tramway from Annemasse to Samoens which had been operated by CEN Réseau de la Haute-Savoie since 1891 was extended by 10 kilometres (6.2 mi) on 24 August 1932 to Sixt and at the same time the whole line was converted to electric traction.

All services were closed on 15 May 1959.

== See also ==
- Communes of the Haute-Savoie department
