= Boussy =

Boussy may refer to:

- Poussi (born 1953), Egyptian actress
- Boussy, Haute-Savoie, a commune in Haute-Savoie, France
