= Saint-Eusèbe =

Saint-Eusèbe may refer to:

- Saint-Eusèbe, Haute-Savoie, a commune in the French region of Rhône-Alpes
- Saint-Eusèbe, Saône-et-Loire, a commune in the French region of Bourgogne
- Saint-Eusèbe, Quebec, a parish municipality in the province of Québec
