= Henri Émery =

French politician

Henri Émery (born 14 June 1767 in Crempigny) was a French civil servant and representative.

== Biography ==
Émery was born in 1767 in Crempigny in the duchy of Savoy. He was the son of Jean-Baptiste Emery and Louise Gaillard.

He was the secretary of the central administration of the Mont-Blanc department in the wake of the annexation of Savoy to France in 1792. He continued his career in departmental administration and was appointed a prefecture counsellor in Chambéry on 14 Floréal, Year 8, (14 May 1800).

He was elected a Mont-Blanc representative to the Chamber of Representatives during the Hundred Days from 11 May to 13 July 1815.

Émery died on an unknown date.
