= Arrondissement of Annecy =

Coordinates: 45°53′48″N 6°07′34″E

Annecy
- Arrondissement
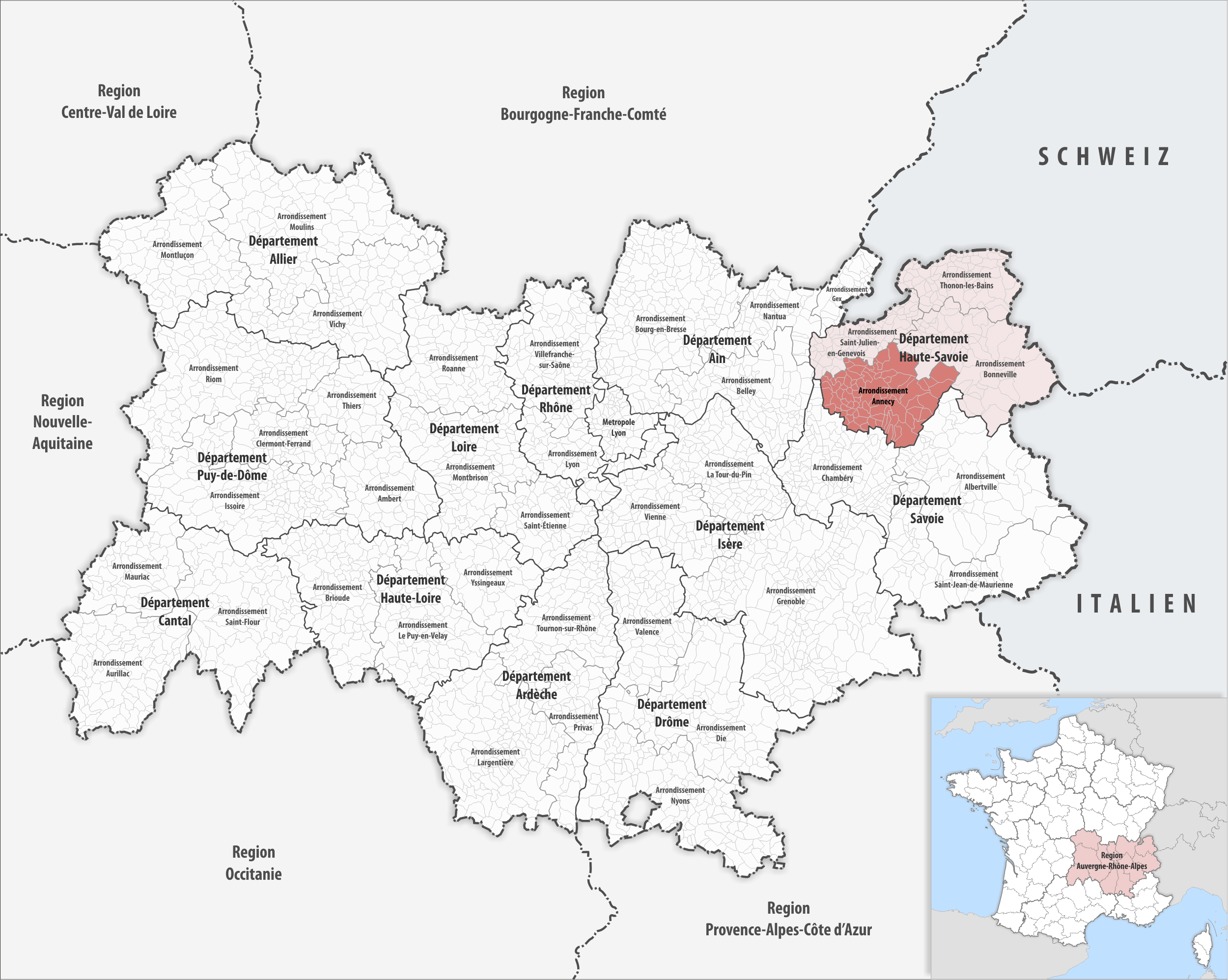
- Location within the region Auvergne-Rhône-Alpes
- Country: France
- Region: Auvergne-Rhône-Alpes
- Department: Haute-Savoie
- No. of communes: {{{nbcomm}}}
- Area: 1,253.9 km^{2} (484.1 sq mi)
- Population (2023): 298,238
  - Density: 237.85/km^{2} (616.02/sq mi)
- INSEE code: 741

The arrondissement of Annecy is an arrondissement of France in the Haute-Savoie department in the Auvergne-Rhône-Alpes region. It has 77 communes. Its population is 293,040 (2021), and its area is 1,253.9 km^{2} (484.1 sq mi).

== Composition ==
The communes of the arrondissement of Annecy, and their INSEE codes, are:

1. Alby-sur-Chéran (74002)
2. Alex (74003)
3. Allèves (74004)
4. Annecy (74010)
5. Argonay (74019)
6. La Balme-de-Sillingy (74026)
7. La Balme-de-Thuy (74027)
8. Bloye (74035)
9. Bluffy (74036)
10. Le Bouchet-Mont-Charvin (74045)
11. Boussy (74046)
12. Chainaz-les-Frasses (74054)
13. Chapeiry (74061)
14. La Chapelle-Saint-Maurice (74060)
15. Charvonnex (74062)
16. Chavanod (74067)
17. Chevaline (74072)
18. Choisy (74076)
19. Les Clefs (74079)
20. La Clusaz (74080)
21. Crempigny-Bonneguête (74095)
22. Cusy (74097)
23. Dingy-Saint-Clair (74102)
24. Doussard (74104)
25. Duingt (74108)
26. Entrevernes (74111)
27. Épagny-Metz-Tessy (74112)
28. Étercy (74117)
29. Faverges-Seythenex (74123)
30. Fillière (74282)
31. Giez (74135)
32. Le Grand-Bornand (74136)
33. Groisy (74137)
34. Gruffy (74138)
35. Hauteville-sur-Fier (74141)
36. Héry-sur-Alby (74142)
37. Lathuile (74147)
38. Leschaux (74148)
39. Lornay (74151)
40. Lovagny (74152)
41. Manigod (74160)
42. Marcellaz-Albanais (74161)
43. Marigny-Saint-Marcel (74165)
44. Massingy (74170)
45. Menthon-Saint-Bernard (74176)
46. Mésigny (74179)
47. Montagny-les-Lanches (74186)
48. Moye (74192)
49. Mûres (74194)
50. Nâves-Parmelan (74198)
51. Nonglard (74202)
52. Poisy (74213)
53. Quintal (74219)
54. Rumilly (74225)
55. Saint-Eustache (74232)
56. Saint-Eusèbe (74231)
57. Saint-Félix (74233)
58. Saint-Ferréol (74234)
59. Saint-Jean-de-Sixt (74239)
60. Saint-Jorioz (74242)
61. Saint-Sylvestre (74254)
62. Sales (74255)
63. Sallenôves (74257)
64. Serraval (74265)
65. Sevrier (74267)
66. Sillingy (74272)
67. Talloires-Montmin (74275)
68. Thônes (74280)
69. Thusy (74283)
70. Val-de-Chaise (74167)
71. Vallières-sur-Fier (74289)
72. Vaulx (74292)
73. Versonnex (74297)
74. Veyrier-du-Lac (74299)
75. Les Villards-sur-Thônes (74302)
76. Villaz (74303)
77. Viuz-la-Chiésaz (74310)

== History ==
The arrondissement of Annecy was created in 1860. In June 2023 it lost two communes to the arrondissement of Saint-Julien-en-Genevois.

As a result of the reorganisation of the cantons of France which came into effect in 2015, the borders of the cantons are no longer related to the borders of the arrondissements. The cantons of the arrondissement of Annecy were, as of January 2015:

1. Alby-sur-Chéran
2. Annecy-Centre
3. Annecy-le-Vieux
4. Annecy-Nord-Est
5. Annecy-Nord-Ouest
6. Faverges
7. Rumilly
8. Seynod
9. Thônes
10. Thorens-Glières
