= Versonnex =

Versonnex may refer to the following places in France:

- Versonnex, Ain, a commune in the department of Ain
- Versonnex, Haute-Savoie, a commune in the department of Haute-Savoie
