= Mûres =

- Commune
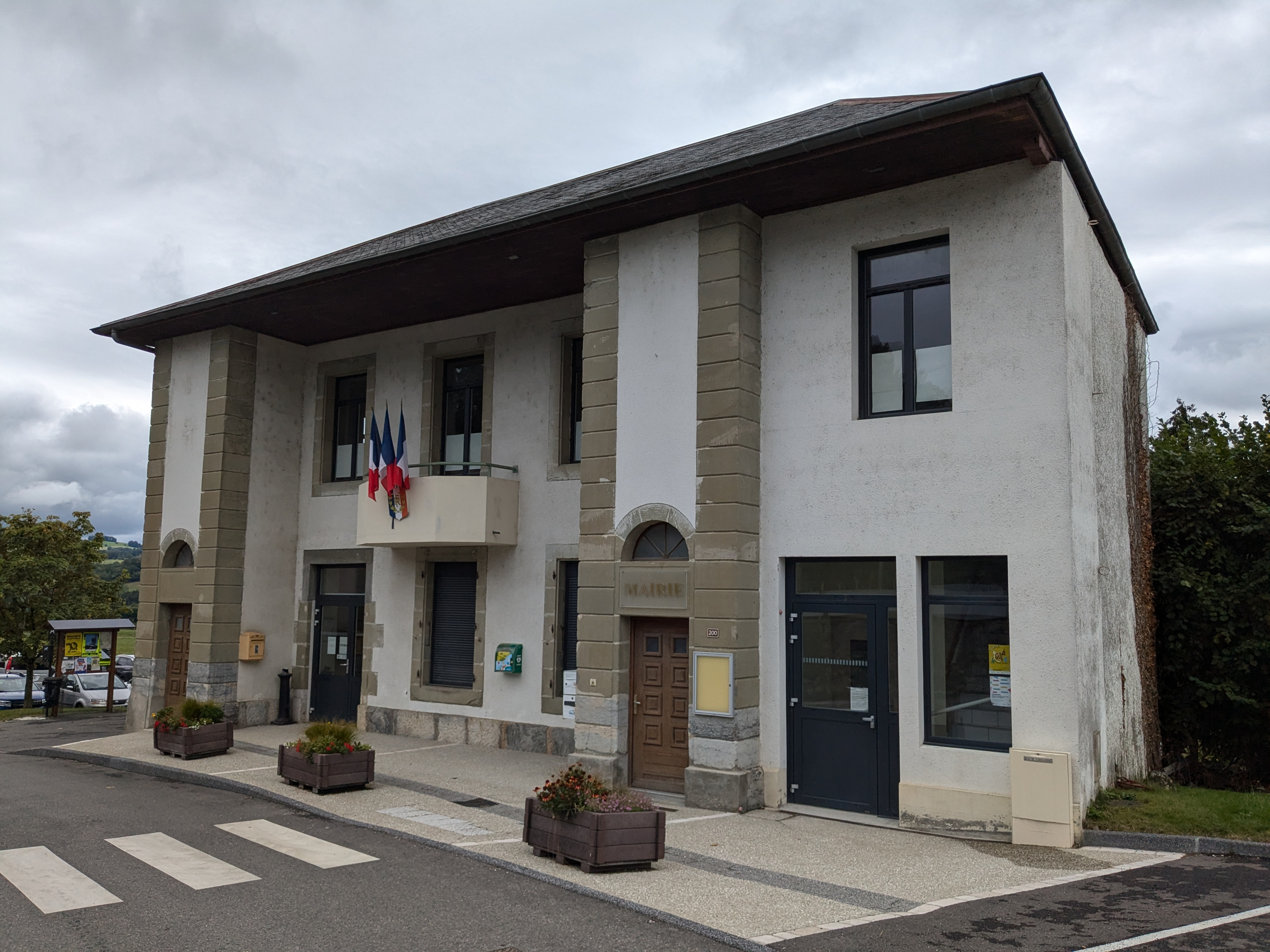
- Town hall
- Location of Mûres
- Location within France Location within Auvergne-Rhône-Alpes
- Coordinates: 45°48′24″N 6°02′21″E
- Country: France
- Region: Auvergne-Rhône-Alpes
- Department: Haute-Savoie
- Arrondissement: Annecy
- Canton: Rumilly
- Intercommunality: CA Grand Annecy

Government
  - Mayor (2020–2026): David Dubosson
- Area^{1}: 5.23 km^{2} (2.02 sq mi)
- Highest elevation: 593 m (1,946 ft)
- Lowest elevation: 380 m (1,250 ft)
- Population (2023): 870
  - Density: 170/km^{2} (430/sq mi)
- Time zone: UTC+01:00 (CET)
  - Summer (DST): UTC+02:00 (CEST)
- INSEE/Postal code: 74194 /74540
- ^{1} French Land Register data, which excludes lakes, ponds, glaciers > 1 km^{2} (0.386 sq mi or 247 acres) and river estuaries.

Mûres (French pronunciation: [myʁ]; Arpitan: Mure) is a commune in the Haute-Savoie department in the Auvergne-Rhône-Alpes region in south-eastern France.

== Geography ==
The Chéran forms the commune's western border.

== See also ==
- Communes of the Haute-Savoie department
