= La Balme-de-Thuy =

Commune in Auvergne-Rhône-Alpes, France

- Commune
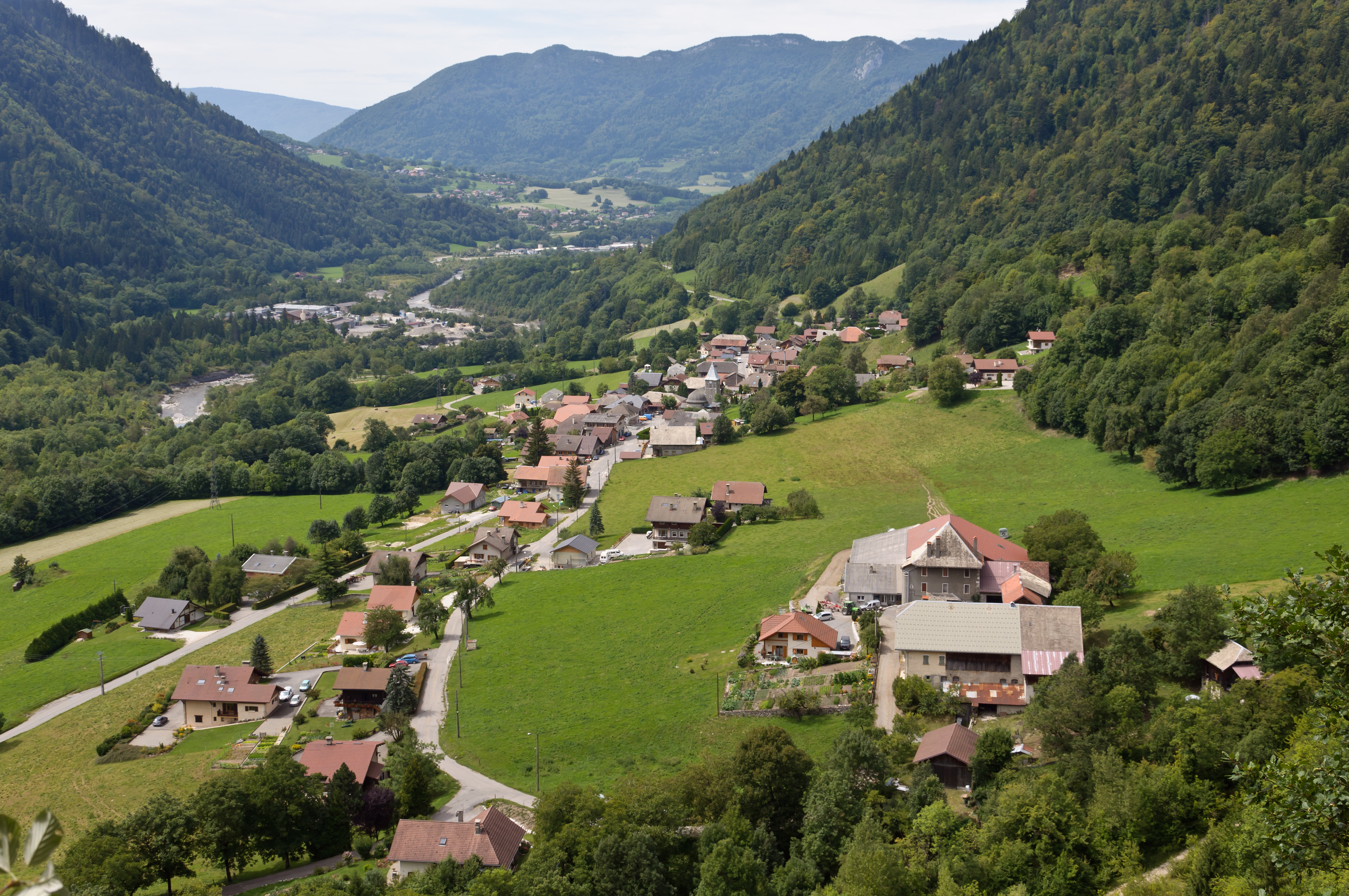
- La Balme-de-Thuy, in the valley of Thônes
- Location of La Balme-de-Thuy
- Location within France Location within Auvergne-Rhône-Alpes
- Coordinates: 45°54′05″N 6°16′37″E
- Country: France
- Region: Auvergne-Rhône-Alpes
- Department: Haute-Savoie
- Arrondissement: Annecy
- Canton: Faverges

Government
  - Mayor (2020–2026): Pierre Barrucand
- Area^{1}: 17.79 km^{2} (6.87 sq mi)
- Highest elevation: 1,915 m (6,283 ft)
- Lowest elevation: 534 m (1,752 ft)
- Population (2023): 460
  - Density: 26/km^{2} (67/sq mi)
- Time zone: UTC+01:00 (CET)
  - Summer (DST): UTC+02:00 (CEST)
- INSEE/Postal code: 74027 /74230
- ^{1} French Land Register data, which excludes lakes, ponds, glaciers > 1 km^{2} (0.386 sq mi or 247 acres) and river estuaries.

La Balme-de-Thuy (French pronunciation: [la balm də tɥi]; Arpitan: La Bârma-dè-Tui) is a commune in the Haute-Savoie department in the Auvergne-Rhône-Alpes region in south-eastern France.

== Geography ==
The Fier flows westward through the middle of the commune and forms part of its western border.

== See also ==
- Communes of the Haute-Savoie department
