= Massingy, Haute-Savoie =

Massingy
- Commune
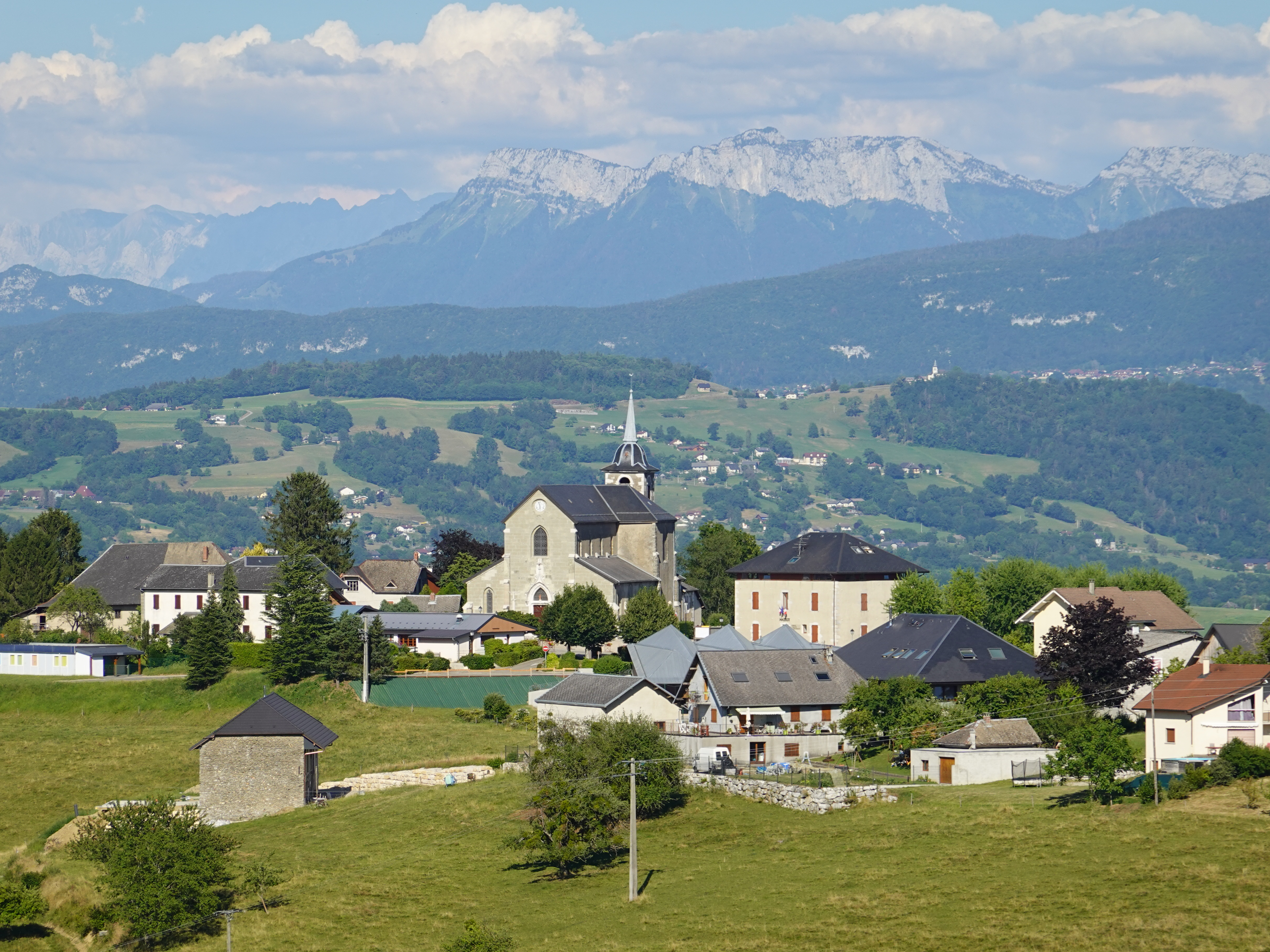

- Coat of arms
- Location of Massingy
- Location within France Location within Auvergne-Rhône-Alpes
- Coordinates: 45°49′50″N 5°55′15″E
- Country: France
- Region: Auvergne-Rhône-Alpes
- Department: Haute-Savoie
- Arrondissement: Annecy
- Canton: Rumilly
- Intercommunality: Rumilly Terre de Savoie

Government
  - Mayor (2020–2026): Jean-Michel Blocman
- Area^{1}: 12.34 km^{2} (4.76 sq mi)
- Highest elevation: 825 m (2,707 ft)
- Lowest elevation: 373 m (1,224 ft)
- Population (2023): 852
  - Density: 69.0/km^{2} (179/sq mi)
- Time zone: UTC+01:00 (CET)
  - Summer (DST): UTC+02:00 (CEST)
- INSEE/Postal code: 74170 /74150
- ^{1} French Land Register data, which excludes lakes, ponds, glaciers > 1 km^{2} (0.386 sq mi or 247 acres) and river estuaries.

Massingy (French pronunciation: [masɛ̃ʒi]; Arpitan: Massingi) is a commune in the Haute-Savoie department and Auvergne-Rhône-Alpes region of eastern France.

== See also ==
- Communes of the Haute-Savoie department
