= Bloye =

Bloye Blèyi (Savoyard)
- Commune
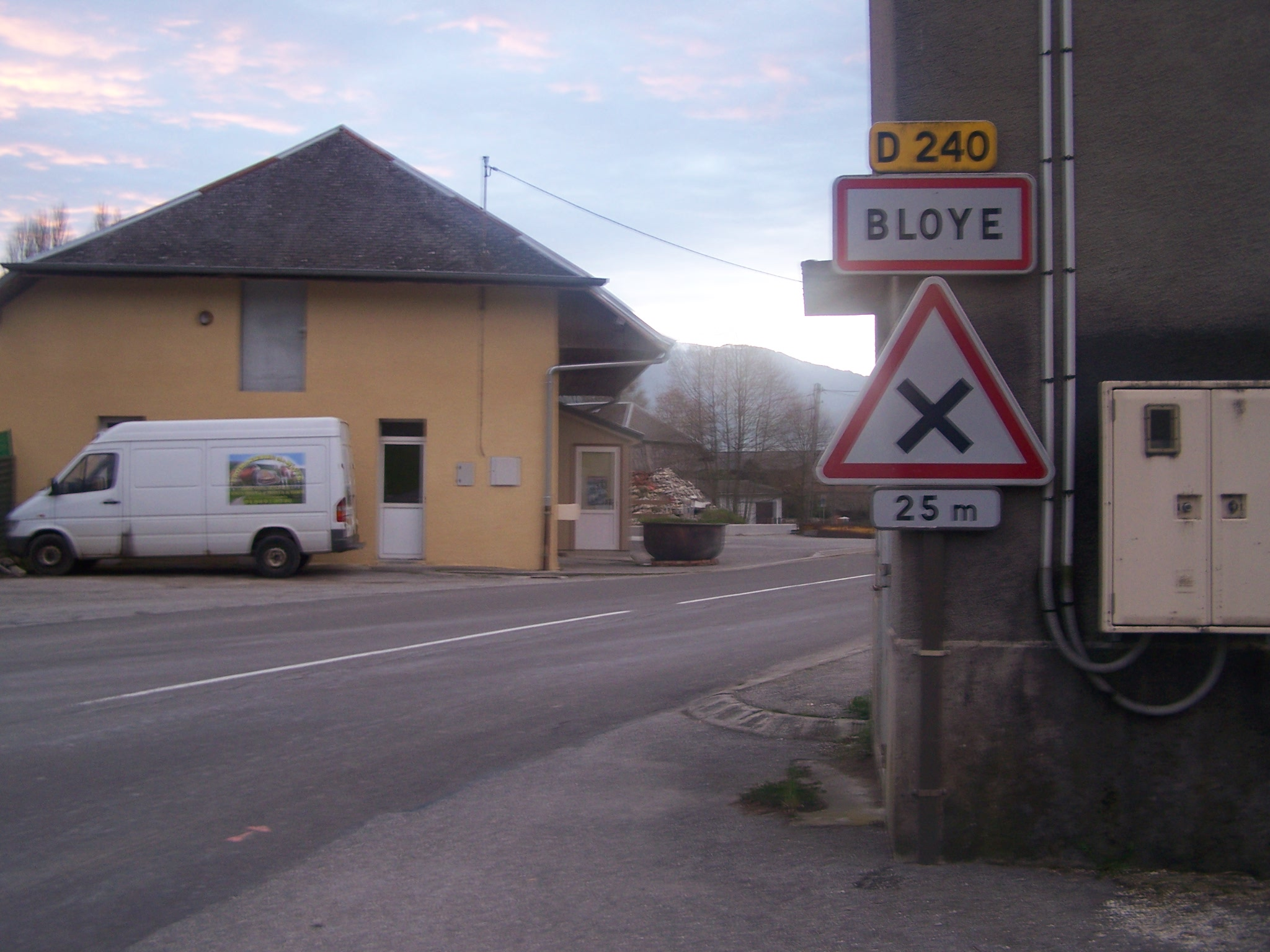
- The main road into Bloye

- Coat of arms
- Location of Bloye
- Location within France Location within Auvergne-Rhône-Alpes
- Coordinates: 45°49′36″N 5°56′46″E
- Country: France
- Region: Auvergne-Rhône-Alpes
- Department: Haute-Savoie
- Arrondissement: Annecy
- Canton: Rumilly
- Intercommunality: Rumilly Terre de Savoie

Government
  - Mayor (2020–2026): Patrick Dumont
- Area^{1}: 4.4 km^{2} (1.7 sq mi)
- Highest elevation: 494 m (1,621 ft)
- Lowest elevation: 352 m (1,155 ft)
- Population (2023): 571
  - Density: 130/km^{2} (340/sq mi)
- Time zone: UTC+01:00 (CET)
  - Summer (DST): UTC+02:00 (CEST)
- INSEE/Postal code: 74035 /74150
- ^{1} French Land Register data, which excludes lakes, ponds, glaciers > 1 km^{2} (0.386 sq mi or 247 acres) and river estuaries.

Bloye (French pronunciation: [blɔj]; Savoyard: Blèyi) is a commune in the Haute-Savoie department and Auvergne-Rhône-Alpes region of eastern France.

== Climate ==
On average, Bloye experiences 83.3 days per year with a minimum temperature below 0 °C (32.0 °F), 1.6 days per year with a minimum temperature below −10 °C (14.0 °F), 4.9 days per year with a maximum temperature below 0 °C (32.0 °F), and 28.8 days per year with a maximum temperature above 30 °C (86.0 °F). The record high temperature was 40.0 °C (104.0 °F) on 13 August 2003; the record low temperature was −16.1 °C (3.0 °F) on 5 February 2012.

Climate data for Bloye (1991–2020 normals, extremes 1995–present)
Month	Jan	Feb	Mar	Apr	May	Jun	Jul	Aug	Sep	Oct	Nov	Dec	Year
Record high °C (°F)	19.1 (66.4)	20.7 (69.3)	25.2 (77.4)	29.0 (84.2)	34.0 (93.2)	37.1 (98.8)	37.5 (99.5)	40.0 (104.0)	32.8 (91.0)	28.2 (82.8)	22.7 (72.9)	20.5 (68.9)	40.0 (104.0)
Mean daily maximum °C (°F)	5.8 (42.4)	8.2 (46.8)	13.2 (55.8)	17.5 (63.5)	21.5 (70.7)	25.8 (78.4)	27.8 (82.0)	27.3 (81.1)	22.7 (72.9)	17.4 (63.3)	10.4 (50.7)	6.1 (43.0)	17.0 (62.6)
Daily mean °C (°F)	2.1 (35.8)	3.4 (38.1)	7.3 (45.1)	11.0 (51.8)	15.2 (59.4)	19.0 (66.2)	20.8 (69.4)	20.4 (68.7)	16.1 (61.0)	12.1 (53.8)	6.2 (43.2)	2.6 (36.7)	11.3 (52.4)
Mean daily minimum °C (°F)	−1.5 (29.3)	−1.4 (29.5)	1.4 (34.5)	4.5 (40.1)	8.9 (48.0)	12.5 (54.5)	13.8 (56.8)	13.6 (56.5)	10.0 (50.0)	6.8 (44.2)	2.1 (35.8)	−0.9 (30.4)	5.8 (42.5)
Record low °C (°F)	−13.5 (7.7)	−16.1 (3.0)	−12.0 (10.4)	−5.8 (21.6)	−0.9 (30.4)	2.0 (35.6)	6.0 (42.8)	5.0 (41.0)	0.3 (32.5)	−6.0 (21.2)	−12.5 (9.5)	−14.0 (6.8)	−16.1 (3.0)
Average precipitation mm (inches)	99.2 (3.91)	82.7 (3.26)	90.0 (3.54)	91.4 (3.60)	98.6 (3.88)	98.9 (3.89)	86.0 (3.39)	100.2 (3.94)	103.7 (4.08)	117.7 (4.63)	117.4 (4.62)	121.0 (4.76)	1,206.8 (47.5)
Average precipitation days (≥ 1.0 mm)	10.0	8.7	9.4	9.5	11.0	9.8	8.5	9.1	8.5	10.6	10.8	11.4	117.3
Source: Meteociel

== See also ==
- Communes of the Haute-Savoie department
