= Marigny-Saint-Marcel =

- Commune
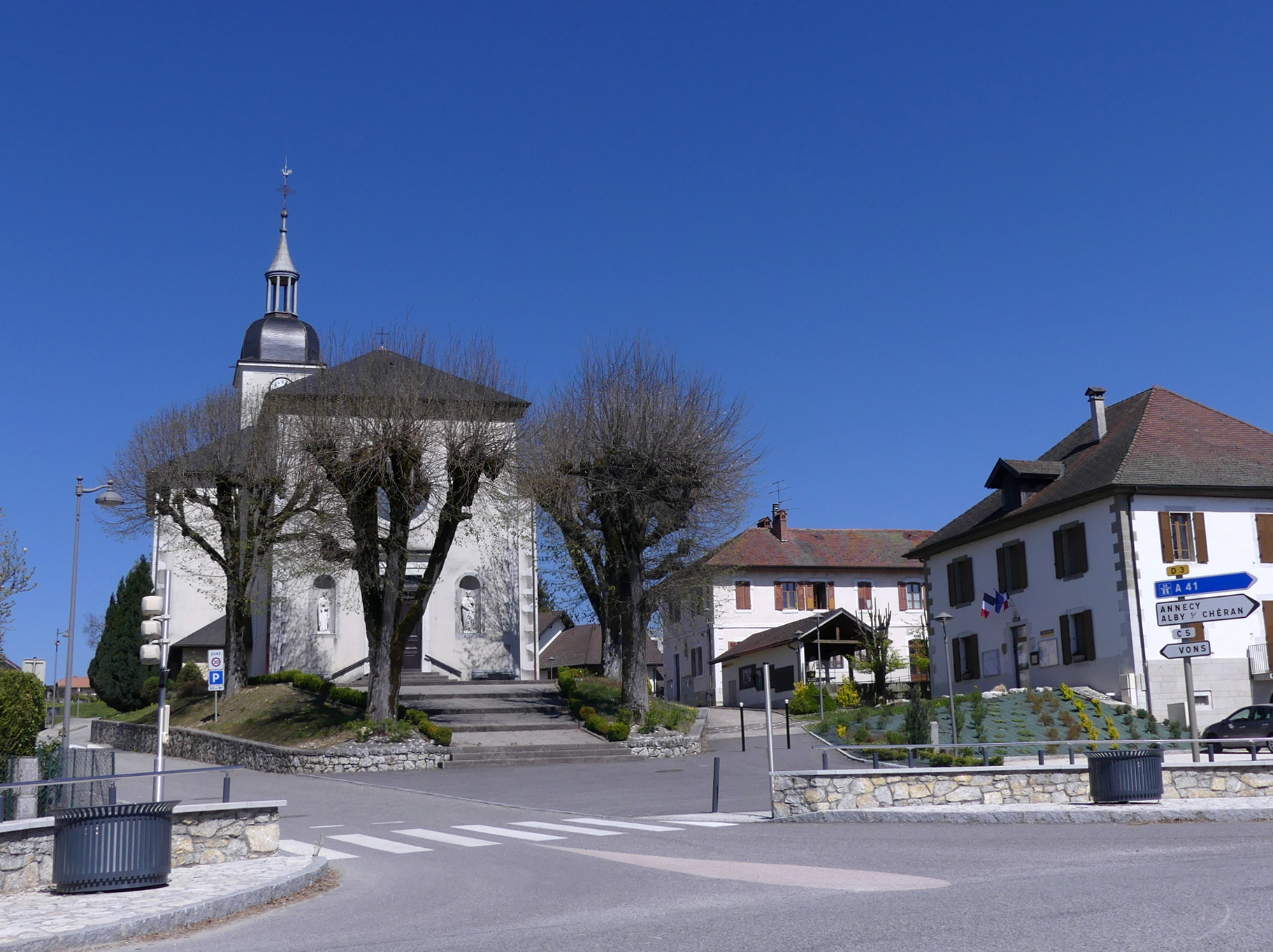

- Coat of arms
- Location of Marigny-Saint-Marcel
- Location within France Location within Auvergne-Rhône-Alpes
- Coordinates: 45°49′48″N 5°59′12″E
- Country: France
- Region: Auvergne-Rhône-Alpes
- Department: Haute-Savoie
- Arrondissement: Annecy
- Canton: Rumilly
- Intercommunality: Rumilly Terre de Savoie

Government
  - Mayor (2020–2026): Jean-Pierre Favre
- Area^{1}: 7.35 km^{2} (2.84 sq mi)
- Highest elevation: 504 m (1,654 ft)
- Lowest elevation: 340 m (1,120 ft)
- Population (2023): 708
  - Density: 96.3/km^{2} (249/sq mi)
- Time zone: UTC+01:00 (CET)
  - Summer (DST): UTC+02:00 (CEST)
- INSEE/Postal code: 74165 /74150
- ^{1} French Land Register data, which excludes lakes, ponds, glaciers > 1 km^{2} (0.386 sq mi or 247 acres) and river estuaries.

Marigny-Saint-Marcel (French pronunciation: [maʁiɲi sɛ̃ maʁsɛl]; Arpitan: Maregni) is a commune in the Haute-Savoie department in the Auvergne-Rhône-Alpes region in south-eastern France.

== Geography ==
The Chéran forms the commune's north-eastern border.

== See also ==
- Communes of the Haute-Savoie department
