= Vaulx, Haute-Savoie =

Vaulx Vô (Arpitan)
- Commune
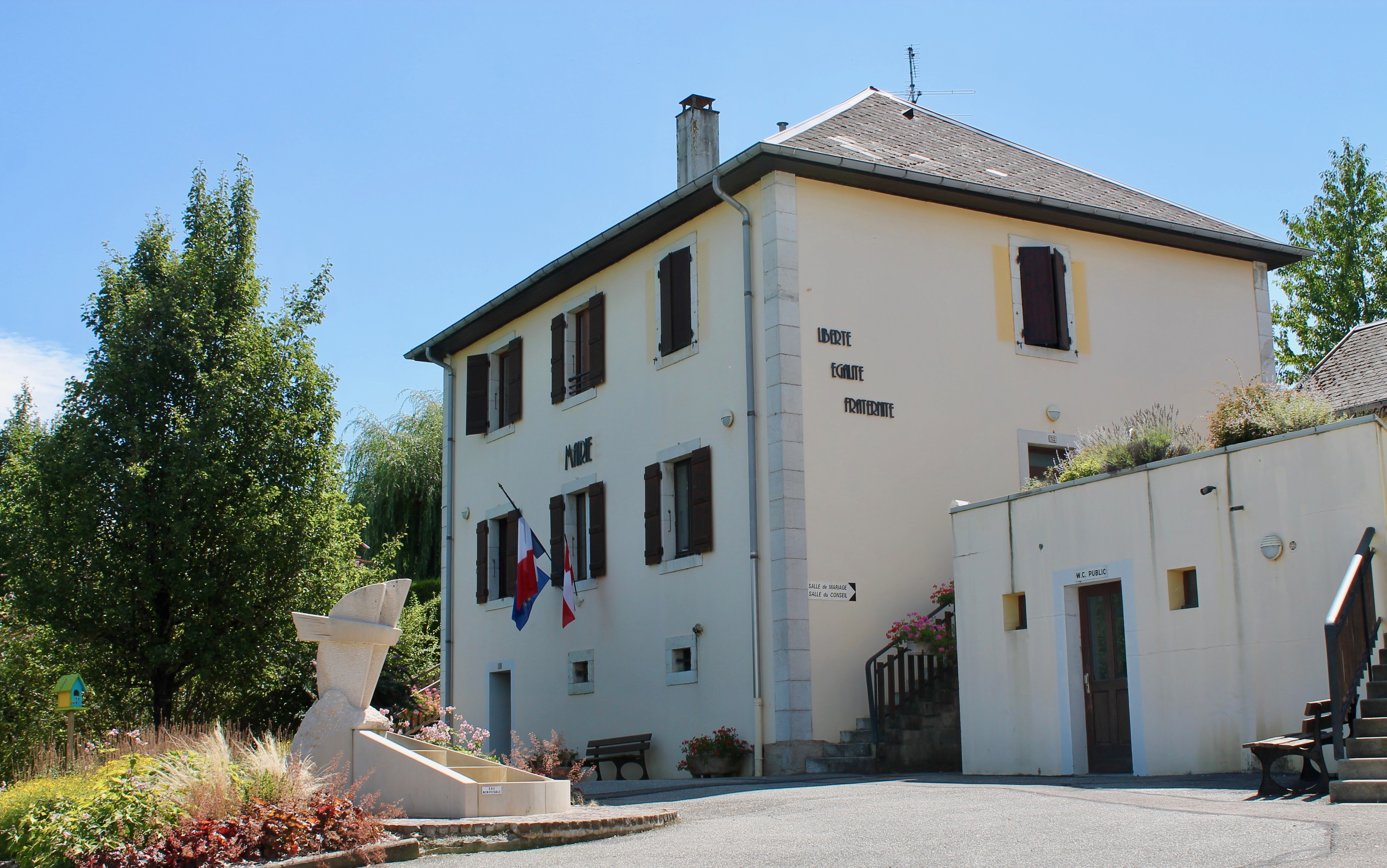
- Town hall
- Location of Vaulx
- Location within France Location within Auvergne-Rhône-Alpes
- Coordinates: 45°55′51″N 5°59′46″E
- Country: France
- Region: Auvergne-Rhône-Alpes
- Department: Haute-Savoie
- Arrondissement: Annecy
- Canton: Rumilly
- Intercommunality: Rumilly Terre de Savoie

Government
  - Mayor (2020–2026): Isabelle Vendrasco
- Area^{1}: 11.19 km^{2} (4.32 sq mi)
- Highest elevation: 712 m (2,336 ft)
- Lowest elevation: 337 m (1,106 ft)
- Population (2023): 1,086
  - Density: 97.05/km^{2} (251.4/sq mi)
- Time zone: UTC+01:00 (CET)
  - Summer (DST): UTC+02:00 (CEST)
- INSEE/Postal code: 74292 /74150
- ^{1} French Land Register data, which excludes lakes, ponds, glaciers > 1 km^{2} (0.386 sq mi or 247 acres) and river estuaries.

Vaulx (French pronunciation: [vo]; Arpitan: Vô) is a commune in the Haute-Savoie department in the Auvergne-Rhône-Alpes region in south-eastern France.

== Geography ==
The river Fier forms part of the commune's southern border.

== See also ==
- Communes of the Haute-Savoie department
