= Marcellaz-Albanais =

Marcellaz-Albanais Marslâ (Arpitan)
- Commune
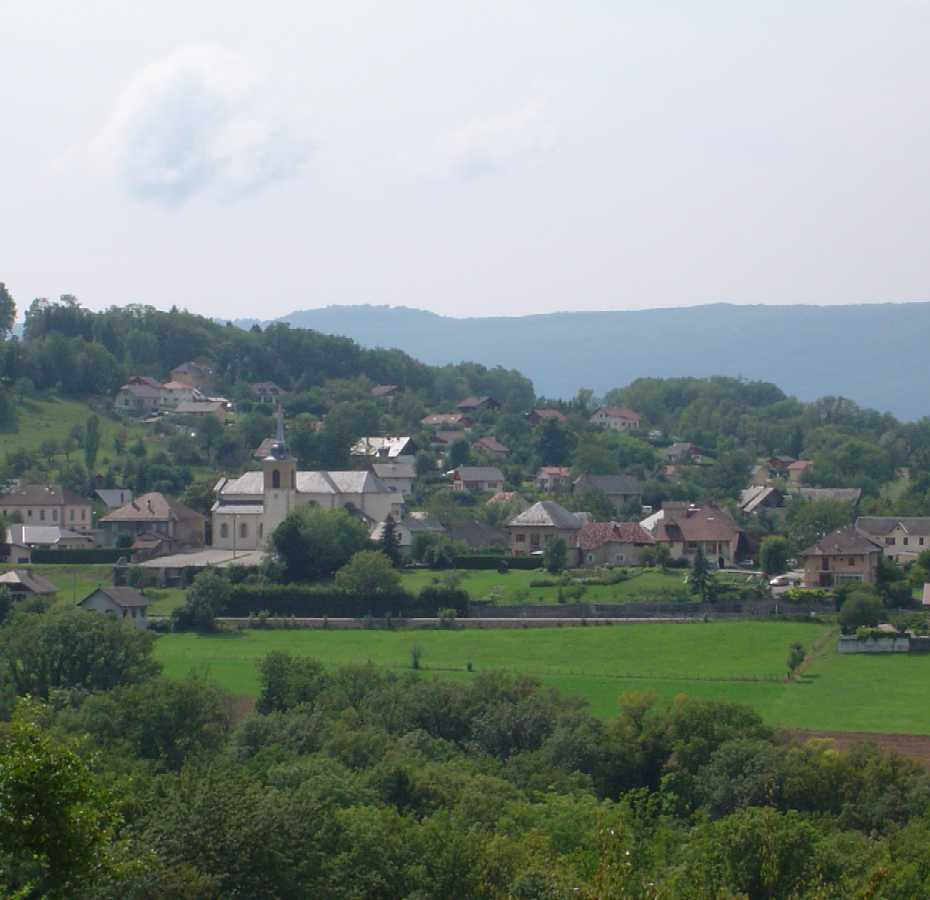
- A general view of Marcellaz-Albanais
- Location of Marcellaz-Albanais
- Location within France Location within Auvergne-Rhône-Alpes
- Coordinates: 45°52′32″N 6°00′07″E
- Country: France
- Region: Auvergne-Rhône-Alpes
- Department: Haute-Savoie
- Arrondissement: Annecy
- Canton: Rumilly
- Intercommunality: Rumilly Terre de Savoie

Government
  - Mayor (2020–2026): Jean-Pierre Lacombe
- Area^{1}: 14.54 km^{2} (5.61 sq mi)
- Highest elevation: 729 m (2,392 ft)
- Lowest elevation: 340 m (1,120 ft)
- Population (2023): 2,058
  - Density: 141.5/km^{2} (366.6/sq mi)
- Demonym: Marcellaziens
- Time zone: UTC+01:00 (CET)
  - Summer (DST): UTC+02:00 (CEST)
- INSEE/Postal code: 74161 /74150
- Website: www.marcellaz-albanais.fr
- ^{1} French Land Register data, which excludes lakes, ponds, glaciers > 1 km^{2} (0.386 sq mi or 247 acres) and river estuaries.

Marcellaz-Albanais (French pronunciation: [maʁsela albanɛ]; Arpitan: Marslâ) is a commune in the Haute-Savoie department located in the Auvergne-Rhône-Alpes region in south-eastern France.

== Population ==
Historical population
Year	Pop.	±% p.a.
1968	599	—
1975	649	+1.15%
1982	839	+3.74%
1990	1,226	+4.86%
1999	1,401	+1.49%
2007	1,687	+2.35%
2012	1,793	+1.23%
2017	1,906	+1.23%
2023	2,058	+1.29%
Source: INSEE

== See also ==
- Communes of the Haute-Savoie department
