= Lovagny =

- Commune
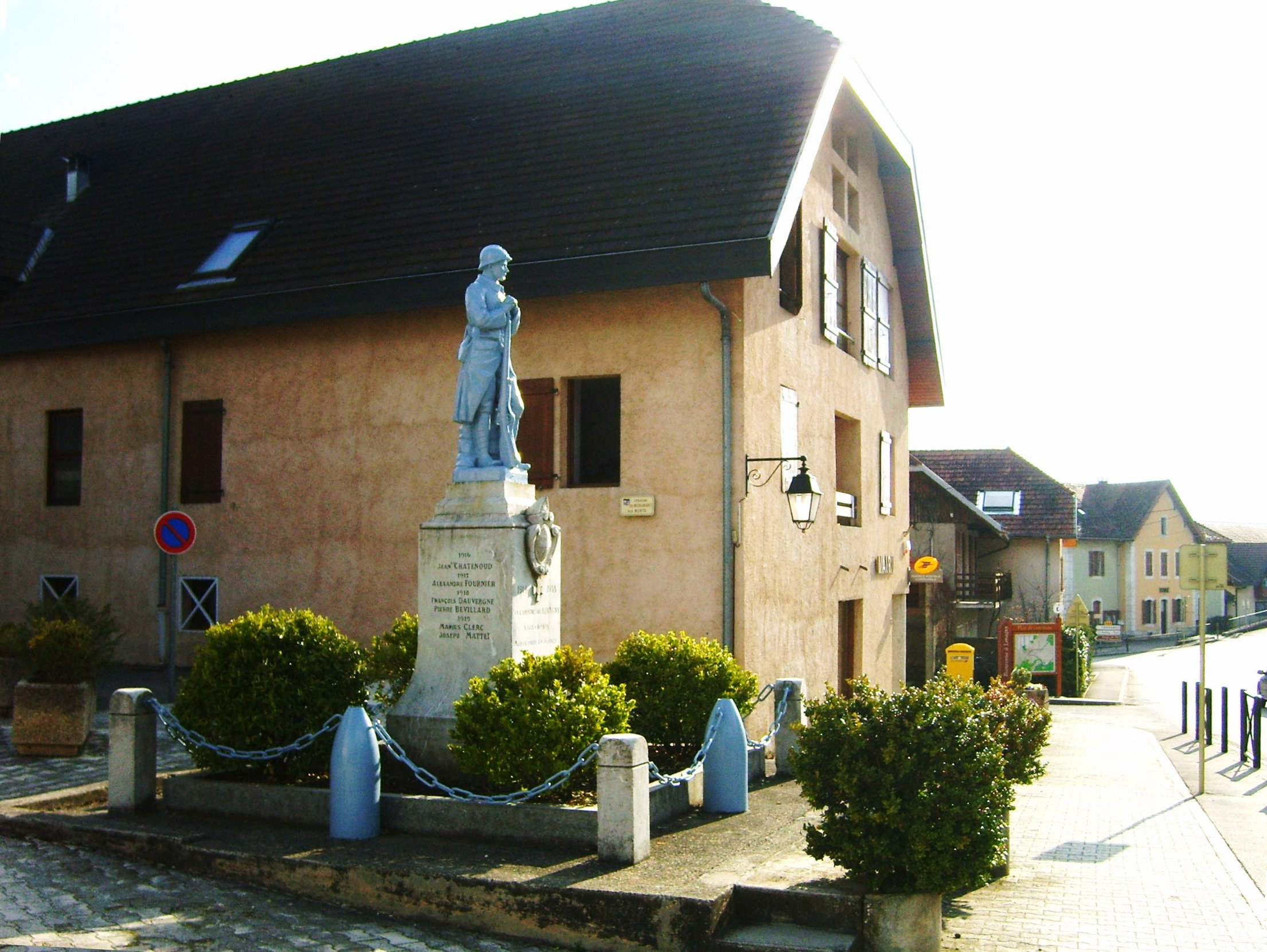
- War monument and town hall of Lovagny

- Coat of arms
- Location of Lovagny
- Location within France Location within Auvergne-Rhône-Alpes
- Coordinates: 45°54′18″N 6°02′02″E
- Country: France
- Region: Auvergne-Rhône-Alpes
- Department: Haute-Savoie
- Arrondissement: Annecy
- Canton: Annecy-1
- Intercommunality: CC Fier et Usses

Government
  - Mayor (2020–2026): Henri Carelli
- Area^{1}: 5.55 km^{2} (2.14 sq mi)
- Highest elevation: 669 m (2,195 ft)
- Lowest elevation: 352 m (1,155 ft)
- Population (2023): 1,358
  - Density: 245/km^{2} (634/sq mi)
- Time zone: UTC+01:00 (CET)
  - Summer (DST): UTC+02:00 (CEST)
- INSEE/Postal code: 74152 /74330
- ^{1} French Land Register data, which excludes lakes, ponds, glaciers > 1 km^{2} (0.386 sq mi or 247 acres) and river estuaries.

Lovagny (French pronunciation: [lɔvaɲi]) is a commune in the Haute-Savoie department in the Auvergne-Rhône-Alpes region in south-eastern France.

== Geography ==
The Fier forms most of the commune's southern border.

== See also ==
- Communes of the Haute-Savoie department
