= Les Clefs =

- Commune
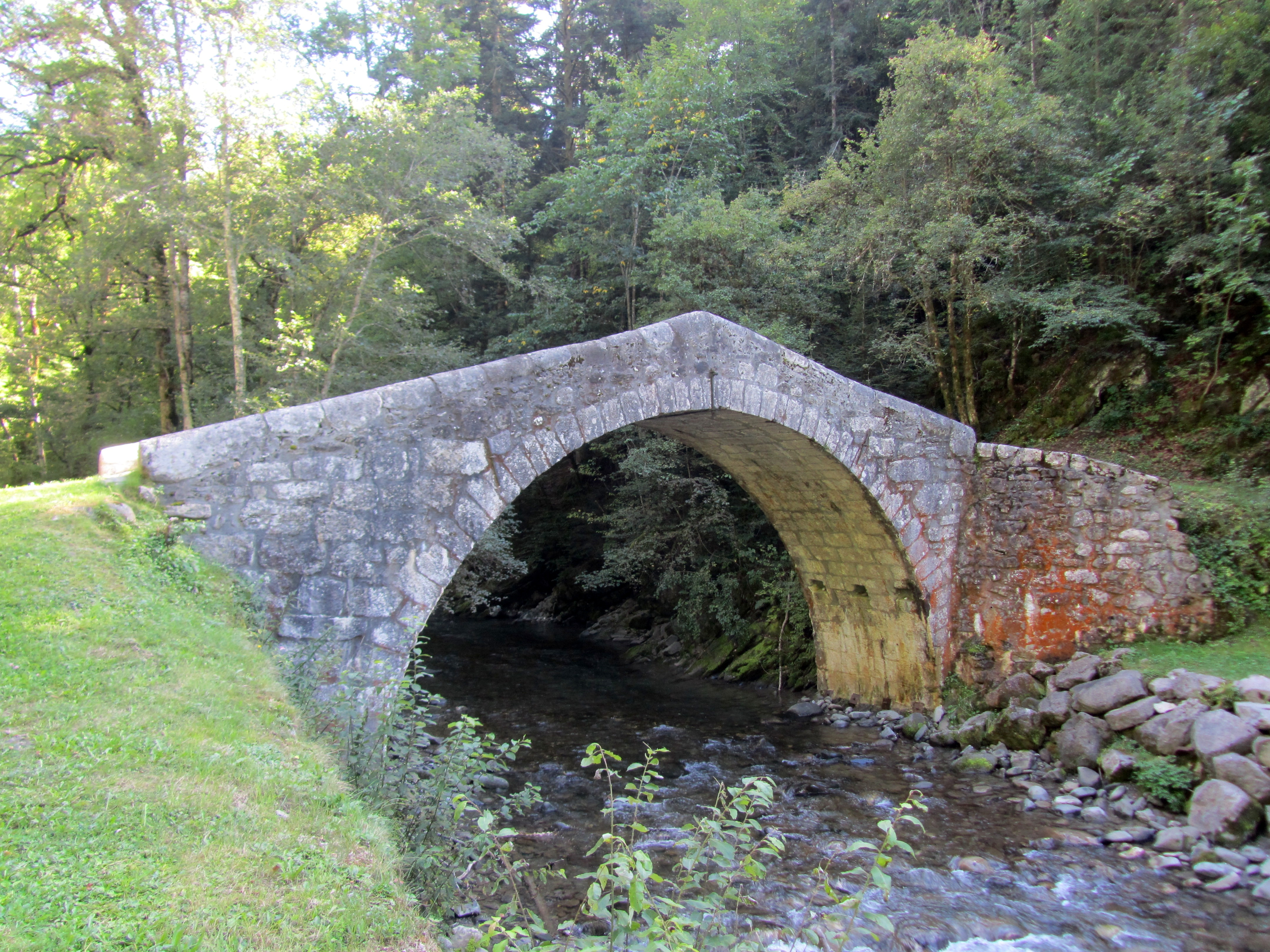
- The "Roman bridge"

- Coat of arms
- Location of Les Clefs
- Location within France Location within Auvergne-Rhône-Alpes
- Coordinates: 45°51′42″N 6°19′44″E
- Country: France
- Region: Auvergne-Rhône-Alpes
- Department: Haute-Savoie
- Arrondissement: Annecy
- Canton: Faverges
- Intercommunality: CC des Vallées de Thônes

Government
  - Mayor (2020–2026): Sébastien Briand
- Area^{1}: 18.47 km^{2} (7.13 sq mi)
- Highest elevation: 2,351 m (7,713 ft)
- Lowest elevation: 670 m (2,200 ft)
- Population (2023): 714
  - Density: 38.7/km^{2} (100/sq mi)
- Time zone: UTC+01:00 (CET)
  - Summer (DST): UTC+02:00 (CEST)
- INSEE/Postal code: 74079 /74230
- ^{1} French Land Register data, which excludes lakes, ponds, glaciers > 1 km^{2} (0.386 sq mi or 247 acres) and river estuaries.

Les Clefs (French pronunciation: [le kle]; Arpitan: Lé Klyè) is a commune in the Haute-Savoie department in the Auvergne-Rhône-Alpes region in south-eastern France.

== Geography ==
The Fier forms part of the commune's north-eastern border, then flows westward through the northern part of the commune.

== See also ==
- Communes of the Haute-Savoie department
