= Thusy =

- Commune
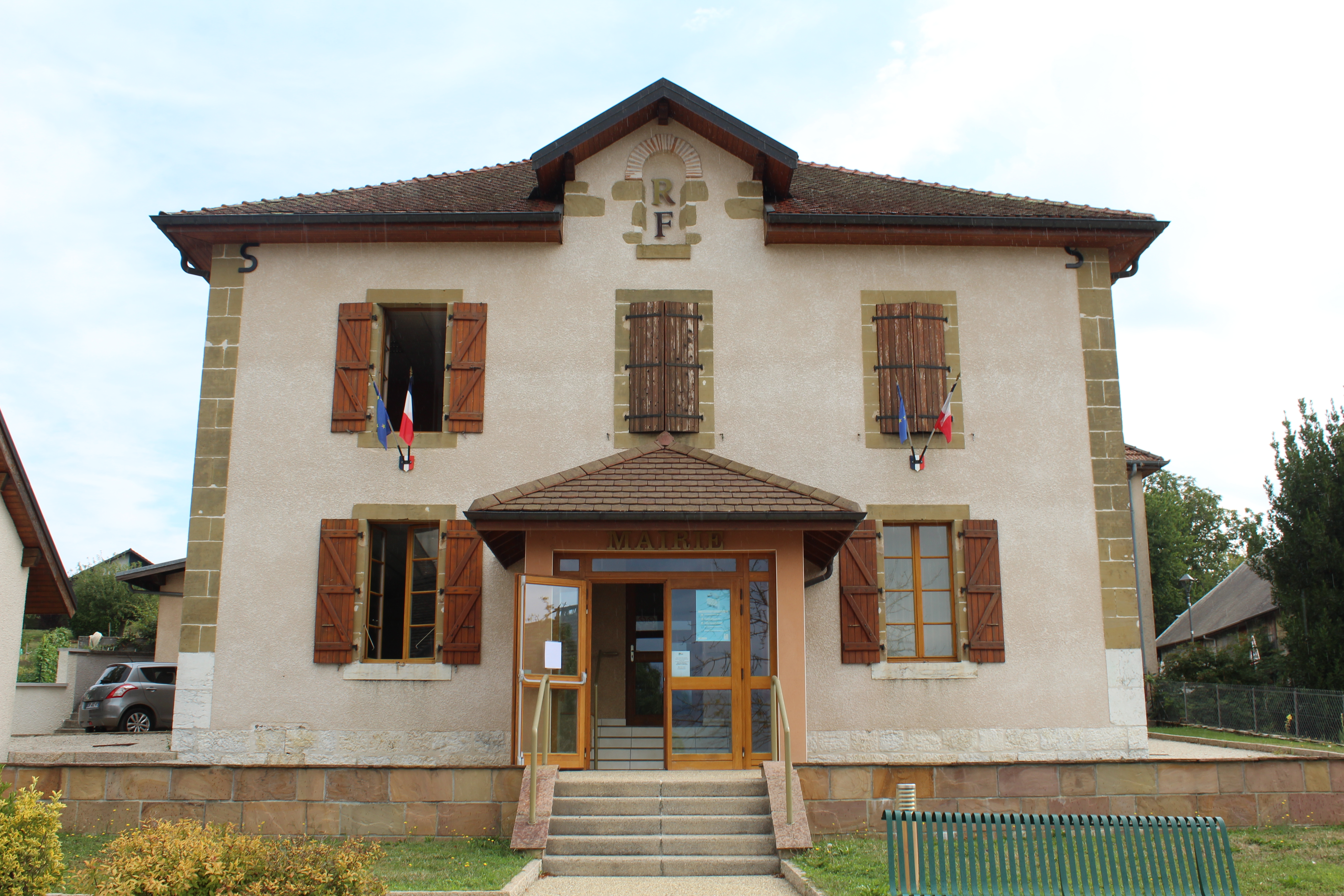
- Town hall

- Coat of arms
- Location of Thusy
- Location within France Location within Auvergne-Rhône-Alpes
- Coordinates: 45°56′53″N 5°56′58″E
- Country: France
- Region: Auvergne-Rhône-Alpes
- Department: Haute-Savoie
- Arrondissement: Annecy
- Canton: Rumilly
- Intercommunality: Rumilly Terre de Savoie

Government
  - Mayor (2020–2026): Joël Mugnier
- Area^{1}: 10.74 km^{2} (4.15 sq mi)
- Highest elevation: 728 m (2,388 ft)
- Lowest elevation: 377 m (1,237 ft)
- Population (2023): 1,181
  - Density: 110.0/km^{2} (284.8/sq mi)
- Demonym: Thusiens / Thusiennes
- Time zone: UTC+01:00 (CET)
  - Summer (DST): UTC+02:00 (CEST)
- INSEE/Postal code: 74283 /74150
- ^{1} French Land Register data, which excludes lakes, ponds, glaciers > 1 km^{2} (0.386 sq mi or 247 acres) and river estuaries.

Thusy (French pronunciation: [tyzi]; Arpitan: Tozi) is a commune in the Haute-Savoie department in the Auvergne-Rhône-Alpes region in south-eastern France.

== See also ==
- Communes of the Haute-Savoie department
