= Lornay =

- Commune
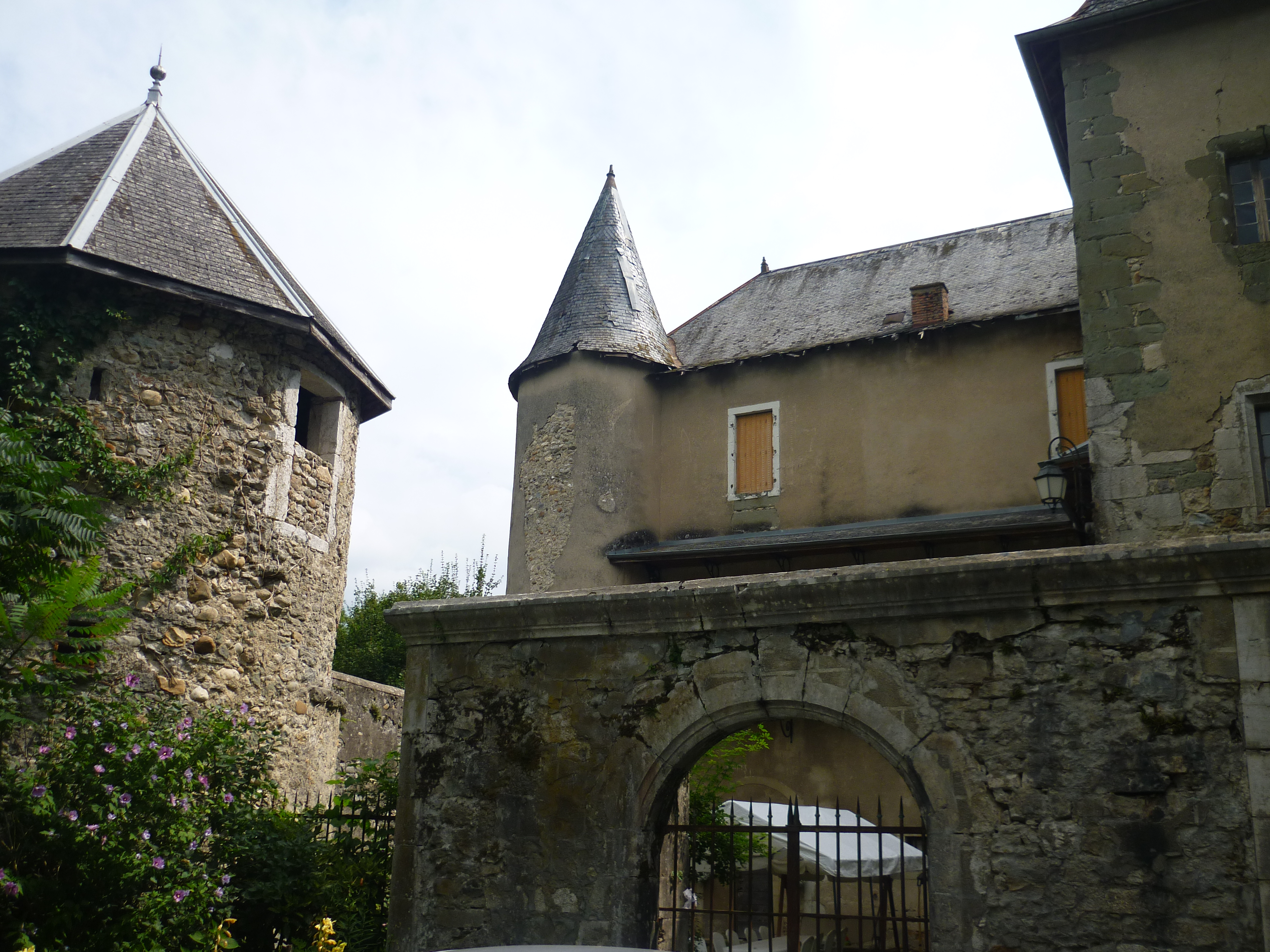
- The Château of Lornay
- Location of Lornay
- Location within France Location within Auvergne-Rhône-Alpes
- Coordinates: 45°55′01″N 5°54′09″E
- Country: France
- Region: Auvergne-Rhône-Alpes
- Department: Haute-Savoie
- Arrondissement: Annecy
- Canton: Rumilly
- Intercommunality: Rumilly Terre de Savoie

Government
  - Mayor (2020–2026): Laurence Kennel
- Area^{1}: 9.65 km^{2} (3.73 sq mi)
- Highest elevation: 1,025 m (3,363 ft)
- Lowest elevation: 295 m (968 ft)
- Population (2023): 588
  - Density: 60.9/km^{2} (158/sq mi)
- Time zone: UTC+01:00 (CET)
  - Summer (DST): UTC+02:00 (CEST)
- INSEE/Postal code: 74151 /74150
- ^{1} French Land Register data, which excludes lakes, ponds, glaciers > 1 km^{2} (0.386 sq mi or 247 acres) and river estuaries.

Lornay (French pronunciation: [lɔʁnɛ]; Arpitan: Lourné) is a commune in the Haute-Savoie department in the Auvergne-Rhône-Alpes region in south-eastern France.

== Geography ==
The Fier forms the commune's eastern border.

== See also ==
- Communes of the Haute-Savoie department
