= Villaz =

- Commune
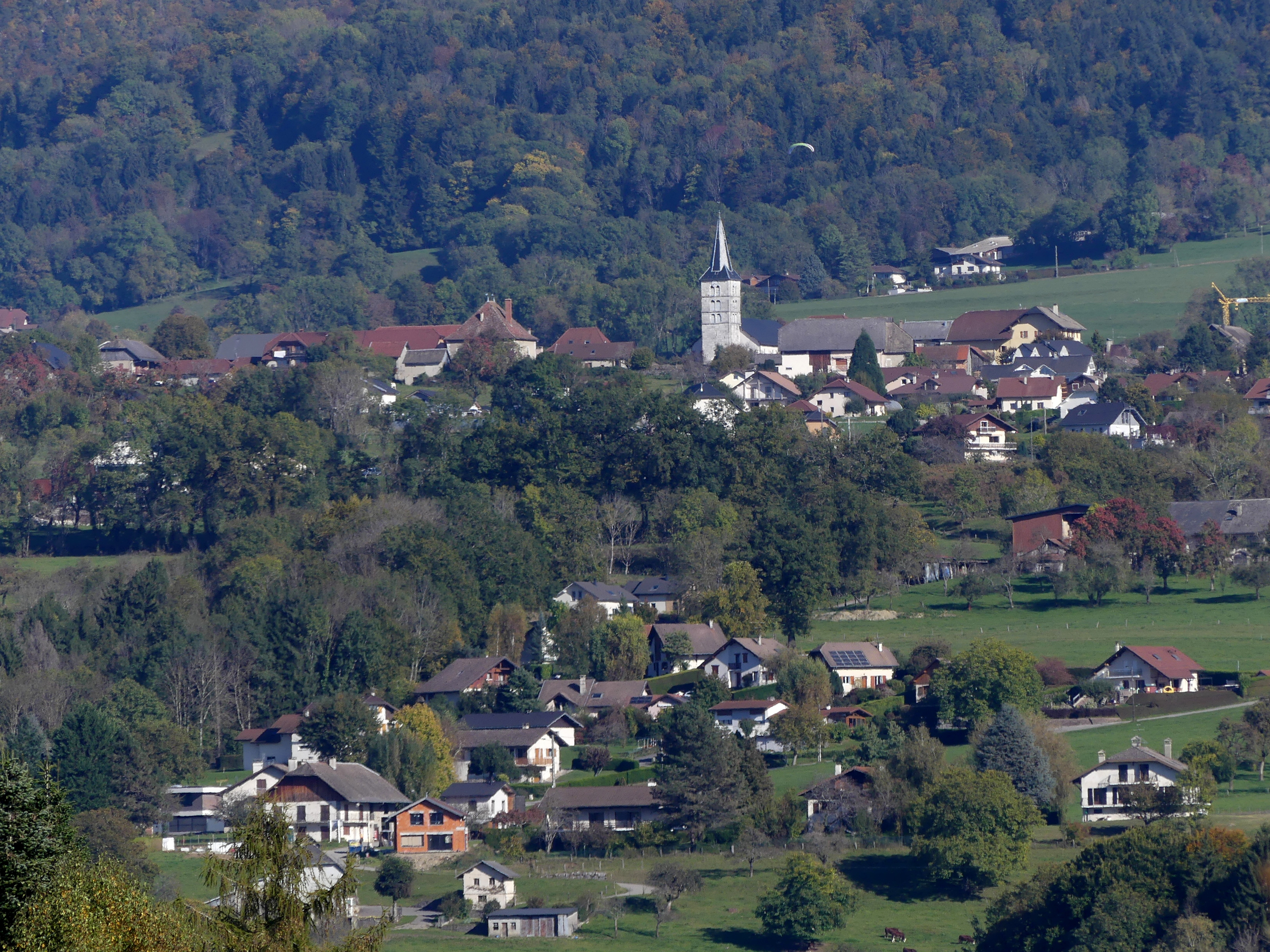
- View of Villaz from Argonay

- Coat of arms
- Location of Villaz
- Location within France Location within Auvergne-Rhône-Alpes
- Coordinates: 45°56′58″N 6°11′29″E
- Country: France
- Region: Auvergne-Rhône-Alpes
- Department: Haute-Savoie
- Arrondissement: Annecy
- Canton: Annecy-3
- Intercommunality: CA Grand Annecy

Government
  - Mayor (2020–2026): Christian Martinod
- Area^{1}: 15.27 km^{2} (5.90 sq mi)
- Elevation: 705 m (2,313 ft)
- Highest elevation: 1,680 m (5,510 ft)
- Lowest elevation: 463 m (1,519 ft)
- Population (2023): 3,607
  - Density: 236.2/km^{2} (611.8/sq mi)
- Demonym: villazois
- Time zone: UTC+01:00 (CET)
  - Summer (DST): UTC+02:00 (CEST)
- INSEE/Postal code: 74303 /74370
- Website: www.villaz.fr
- ^{1} French Land Register data, which excludes lakes, ponds, glaciers > 1 km^{2} (0.386 sq mi or 247 acres) and river estuaries.

Villaz (French pronunciation: [vilaz]) is a commune in the Haute-Savoie department in the Auvergne-Rhône-Alpes region in south-eastern France.

== Geography ==
The river Fier forms the commune's southern border.

== Population ==
Historical population
Year	Pop.	±% p.a.
1968	612	—
1975	814	+4.16%
1982	1,129	+4.78%
1990	1,602	+4.47%
1999	2,068	+2.88%
2007	2,414	+1.95%
2012	3,059	+4.85%
2017	3,427	+2.30%
2023	3,607	+0.86%
Source: INSEE

== See also ==
- Communes of the Haute-Savoie department
