= Chapeiry =

- Commune
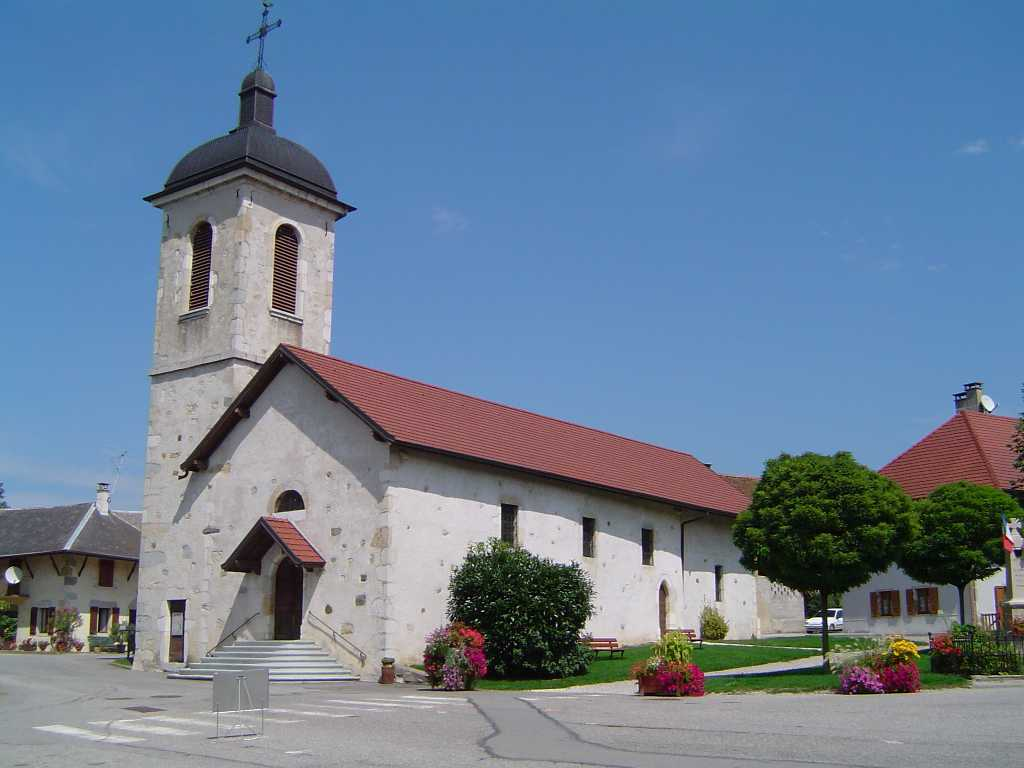
- The church in Chapeiry
- Location of Chapeiry
- Location within France Location within Auvergne-Rhône-Alpes
- Coordinates: 45°46′26″N 6°02′18″E
- Country: France
- Region: Auvergne-Rhône-Alpes
- Department: Haute-Savoie
- Arrondissement: Annecy
- Canton: Rumilly
- Intercommunality: CA Grand Annecy

Government
  - Mayor (2020–2026): Gilles Ardin
- Area^{1}: 5.76 km^{2} (2.22 sq mi)
- Highest elevation: 725 m (2,379 ft)
- Lowest elevation: 420 m (1,380 ft)
- Population (2023): 984
  - Density: 171/km^{2} (442/sq mi)
- Demonym: Chapériens
- Time zone: UTC+01:00 (CET)
  - Summer (DST): UTC+02:00 (CEST)
- INSEE/Postal code: 74061 /74540
- ^{1} French Land Register data, which excludes lakes, ponds, glaciers > 1 km^{2} (0.386 sq mi or 247 acres) and river estuaries.

Chapeiry (French pronunciation: [ʃapɛʁi]; Arpitan: Chapèri, before 1984: Chapery) is a commune in the Haute-Savoie department in the Auvergne-Rhône-Alpes region in south-eastern France.

== See also ==
- Communes of the Haute-Savoie department
