= Fier (river) =

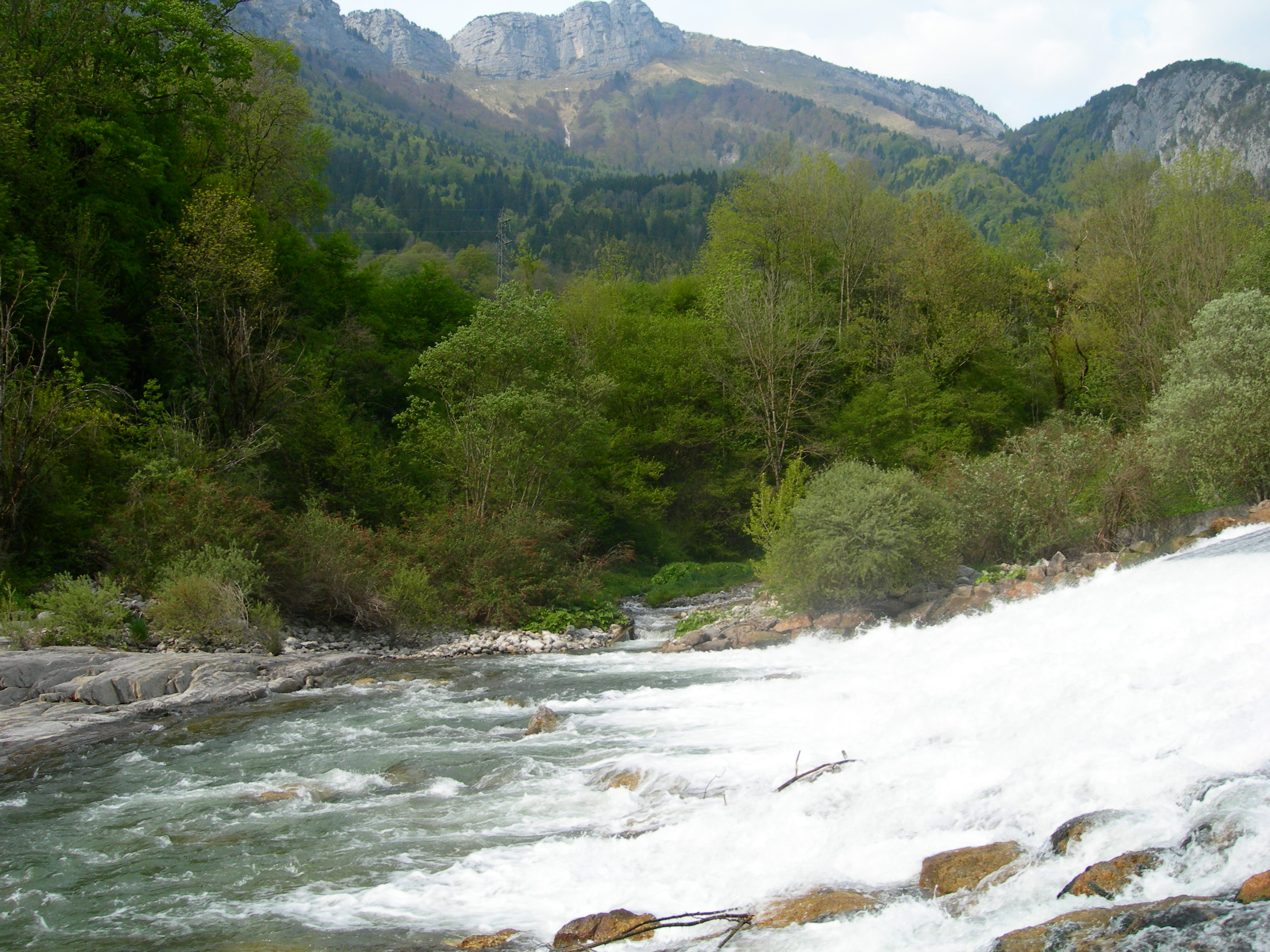
- The Fier

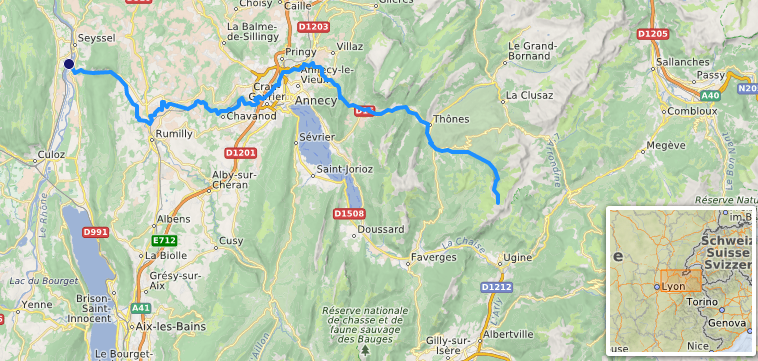

Location
- Country: France

Physical characteristics
- Source
  - location: Manigod
  - coordinates: 45°48′45″N 06°25′03″E
  - elevation: 1,800 m (5,900 ft)
- Mouth
  - location: Rhône
  - coordinates: 45°56′21″N 05°49′55″E
  - elevation: 255 m (837 ft)
- Length: 72.2 km (44.9 mi)
- Basin size: 1,380 km^{2} (530 sq mi)
- Discharge
  - average: 41.2 m^{3}/s (1,450 cu ft/s)

Basin features
- Progression: Rhône→ Mediterranean Sea
- Tributaries
  - left: Thiou, Chéran

The Fier (French pronunciation: [fjɛʁ]) is a 72.2 km (44.9 mi) long river in the Haute-Savoie and Savoie départements, southeastern France. Its source is at Manigod, in the Aravis Range. It flows generally west. It is a left tributary of the Rhône into which it flows at Seyssel.

Among its tributaries are the Chéran and the Thiou, that drains Lake Annecy.

== Départements and communes along its course ==
This list is ordered from source to mouth:

- Haute-Savoie: Manigod, Les Clefs, Thônes, La Balme-de-Thuy, Alex, Dingy-Saint-Clair, Annecy-le-Vieux, Nâves-Parmelan, Villaz, Argonay, Pringy, Metz-Tessy, Meythet, Annecy, Cran-Gevrier, Poisy, Chavanod, Lovagny, Étercy, Vaulx, Hauteville-sur-Fier, Sales, Vallières, Rumilly, Moye, Lornay, Val-de-Fier,
- Savoie: Motz
- Haute-Savoie: Seyssel
