= Dingy-Saint-Clair =

- Commune
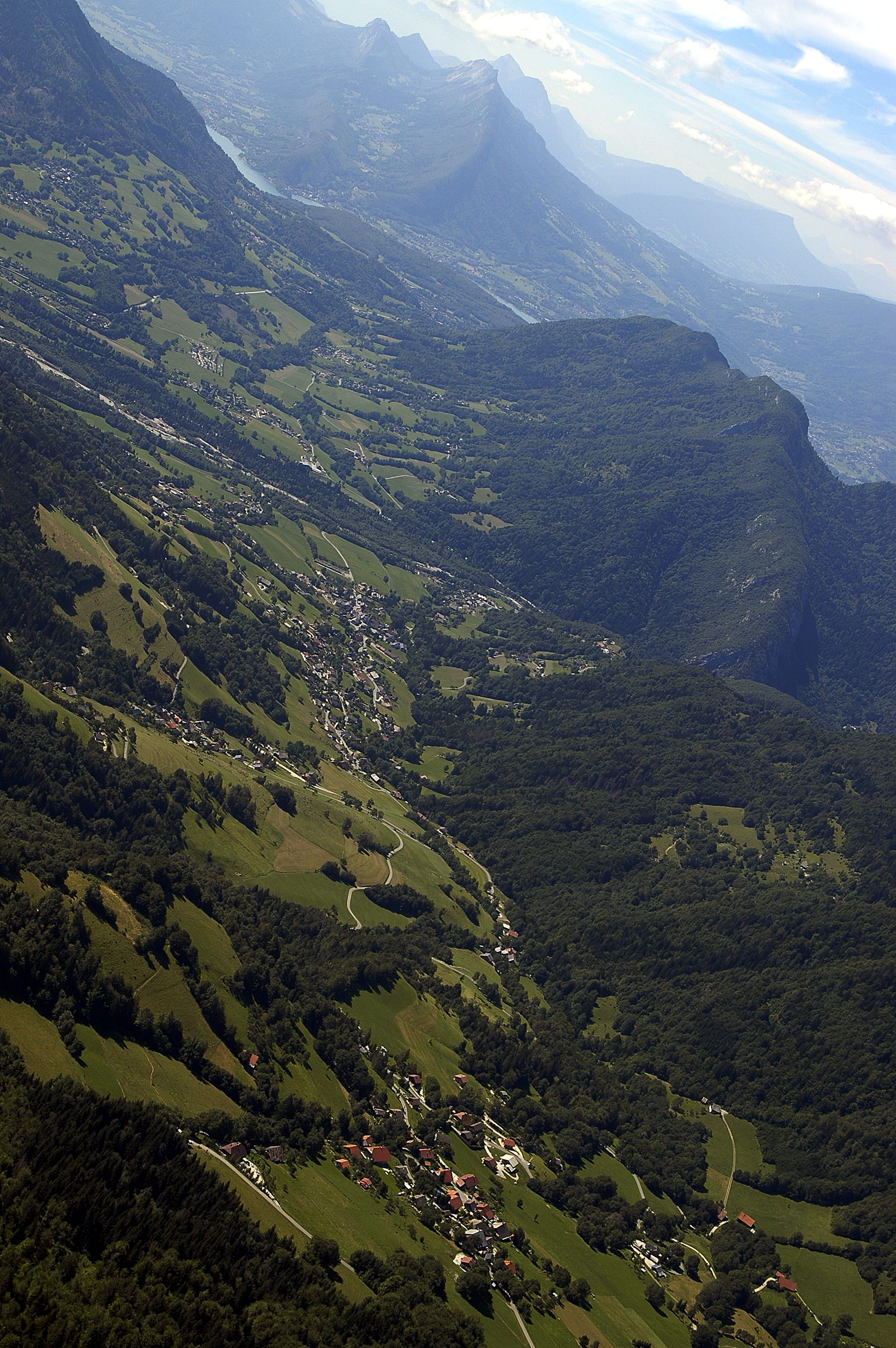
- Dingy-Saint-Clair seen from the Parmelan
- Location of Dingy-Saint-Clair
- Location within France Location within Auvergne-Rhône-Alpes
- Coordinates: 45°54′45″N 6°13′23″E
- Country: France
- Region: Auvergne-Rhône-Alpes
- Department: Haute-Savoie
- Arrondissement: Annecy
- Canton: Faverges

Government
  - Mayor (2020–2026): Laurence Audette
- Area^{1}: 34.12 km^{2} (13.17 sq mi)
- Elevation: 594 m (1,949 ft)
- Highest elevation: 1,856 m (6,089 ft)
- Lowest elevation: 492 m (1,614 ft)
- Population (2023): 1,466
  - Density: 42.97/km^{2} (111.3/sq mi)
- Time zone: UTC+01:00 (CET)
  - Summer (DST): UTC+02:00 (CEST)
- INSEE/Postal code: 74102 /74230
- ^{1} French Land Register data, which excludes lakes, ponds, glaciers > 1 km^{2} (0.386 sq mi or 247 acres) and river estuaries.

Dingy-Saint-Clair (French pronunciation: [dɛ̃ʒi sɛ̃ klɛːʁ]) is a commune in the Haute-Savoie department in the Auvergne-Rhône-Alpes region in south-eastern France.

== Geography ==
The commune is around 5 kilometres (3 mi) east of Annecy. The Fier forms the commune's south-western border.

== See also ==
- Communes of the Haute-Savoie department
