= Gruffy =

- Commune
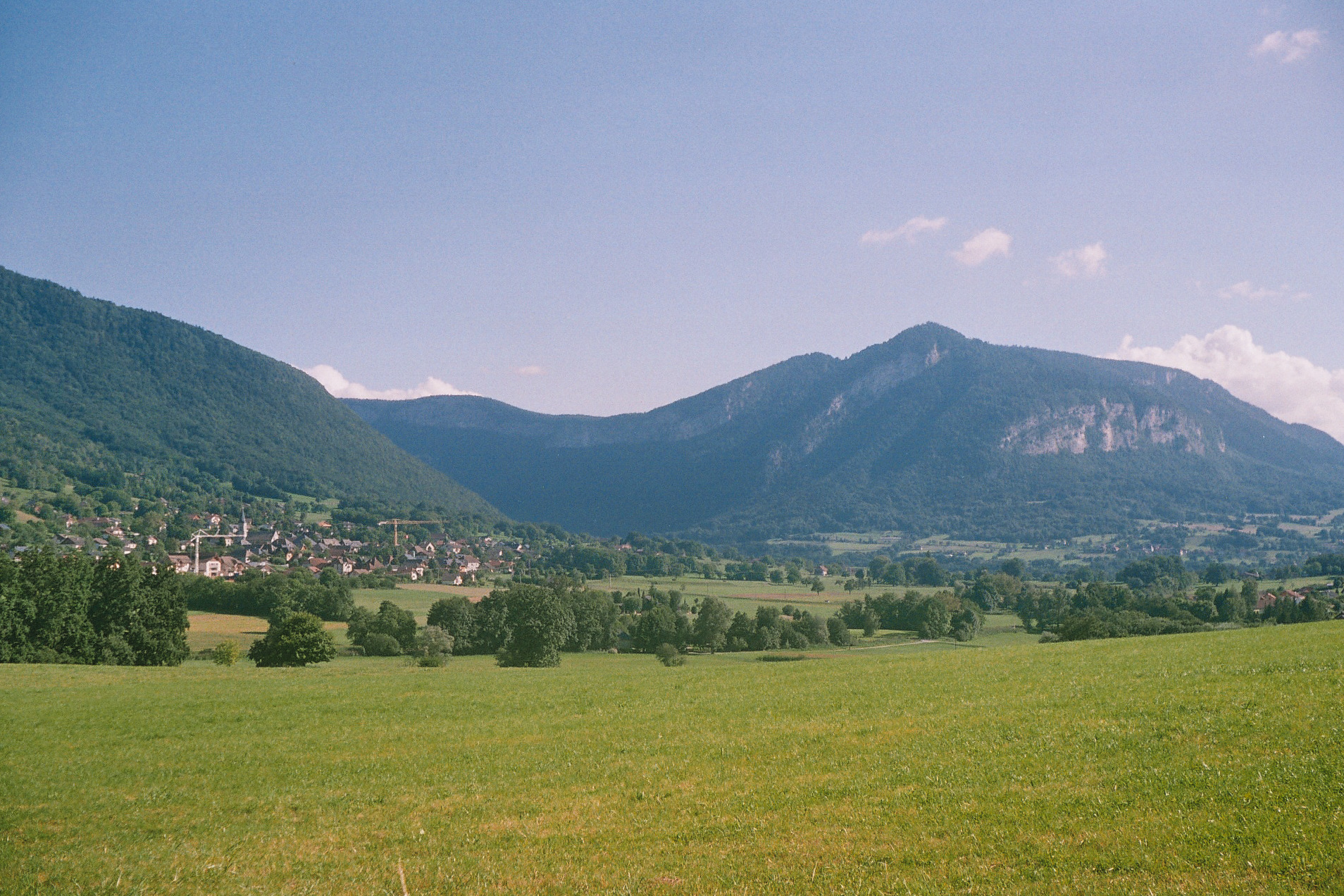
- A general view of Gruffy
- Location of Gruffy
- Location within France Location within Auvergne-Rhône-Alpes
- Coordinates: 45°47′19″N 6°03′20″E
- Country: France
- Region: Auvergne-Rhône-Alpes
- Department: Haute-Savoie
- Arrondissement: Annecy
- Canton: Rumilly
- Intercommunality: CA Grand Annecy

Government
  - Mayor (2020–2026): Marie-Luce Perdrix
- Area^{1}: 14.44 km^{2} (5.58 sq mi)
- Highest elevation: 1,644 m (5,394 ft)
- Lowest elevation: 400 m (1,300 ft)
- Population (2023): 1,504
  - Density: 104.2/km^{2} (269.8/sq mi)
- Time zone: UTC+01:00 (CET)
  - Summer (DST): UTC+02:00 (CEST)
- INSEE/Postal code: 74138 /74540
- ^{1} French Land Register data, which excludes lakes, ponds, glaciers > 1 km^{2} (0.386 sq mi or 247 acres) and river estuaries.

Gruffy (French pronunciation: [ɡʁyfi]; Arpitan: Grôfi) is a commune in the Haute-Savoie department in the Auvergne-Rhône-Alpes region in south-eastern France.

== Geography ==
The Chéran forms the commune's south-western border.

== See also ==
- Communes of the Haute-Savoie department
