= Étercy =

- Commune
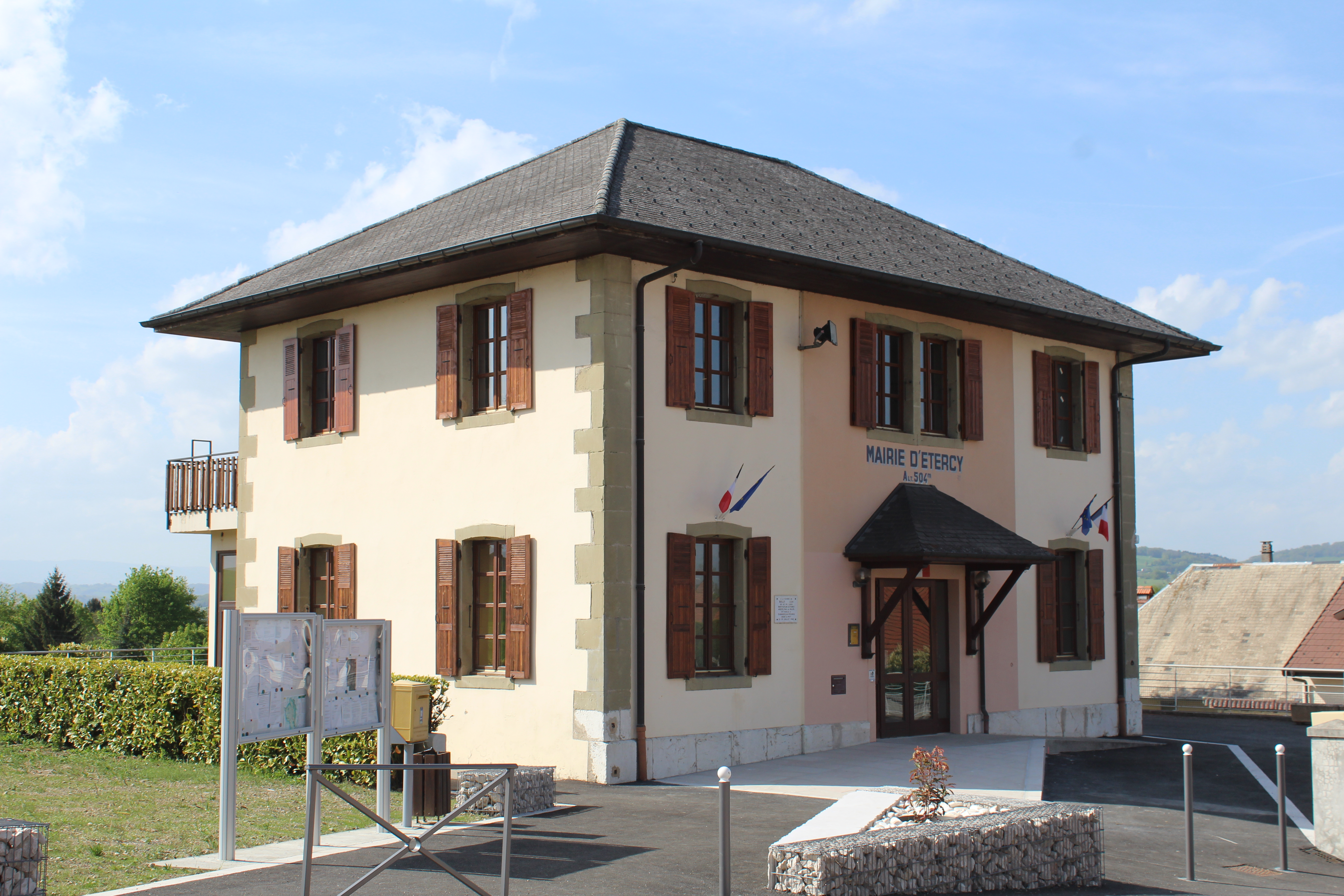
- Town hall
- Location of Étercy
- Location within France Location within Auvergne-Rhône-Alpes
- Coordinates: 45°53′30″N 6°00′35″E
- Country: France
- Region: Auvergne-Rhône-Alpes
- Department: Haute-Savoie
- Arrondissement: Annecy
- Canton: Rumilly
- Intercommunality: Rumilly Terre de Savoie

Government
  - Mayor (2020–2026): Patrick Bastian
- Area^{1}: 4.55 km^{2} (1.76 sq mi)
- Highest elevation: 593 m (1,946 ft)
- Lowest elevation: 337 m (1,106 ft)
- Population (2023): 985
  - Density: 216/km^{2} (561/sq mi)
- Time zone: UTC+01:00 (CET)
  - Summer (DST): UTC+02:00 (CEST)
- INSEE/Postal code: 74117 /74150
- ^{1} French Land Register data, which excludes lakes, ponds, glaciers > 1 km^{2} (0.386 sq mi or 247 acres) and river estuaries.

Étercy (French pronunciation: [etɛʁsi]) is a commune in the Haute-Savoie department in the Auvergne-Rhône-Alpes region in south-eastern[France. The area of this commune is 4.55 km^{2} (1.76 sq mi) and population as of January 2019 is 838.

== Geography ==
The Fier forms most of the commune's northern border.

== See also ==
- Communes of the Haute-Savoie department
