= Allèves =

Allèves Alève (Savoyard)
- Commune
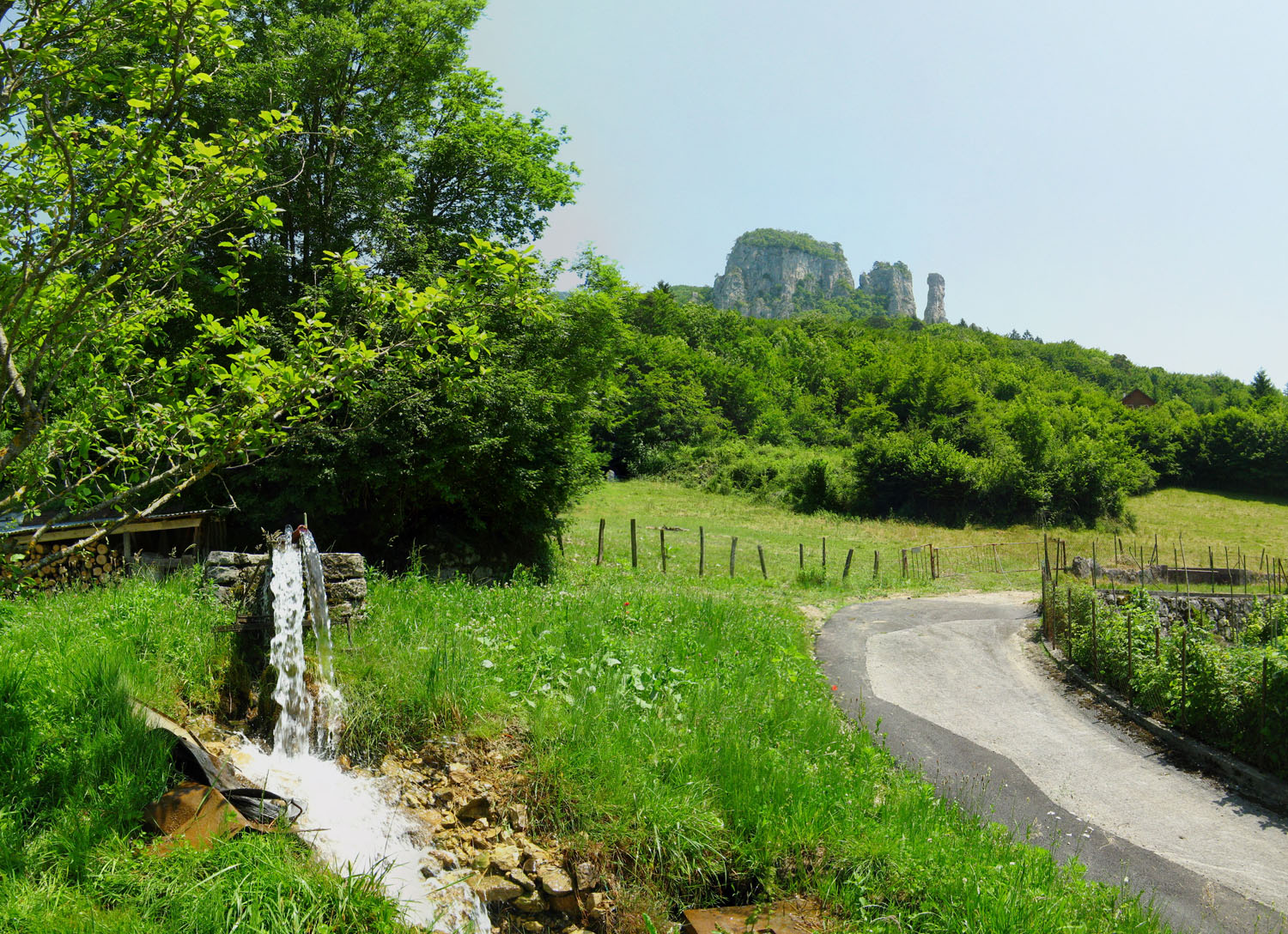
- A view of the towers of Saint-Jacques, in Allèves

- Coat of arms
- Location of Allèves
- Location within France Location within Auvergne-Rhône-Alpes
- Coordinates: 45°45′10″N 6°04′52″E
- Country: France
- Region: Auvergne-Rhône-Alpes
- Department: Haute-Savoie
- Arrondissement: Annecy
- Canton: Rumilly
- Intercommunality: CA Grand Annecy

Government
  - Mayor (2020–2026): Noëlle Delorme
- Area^{1}: 8.81 km^{2} (3.40 sq mi)
- Highest elevation: 1,621 m (5,318 ft)
- Lowest elevation: 480 m (1,570 ft)
- Population (2023): 397
  - Density: 45.1/km^{2} (117/sq mi)
- Demonym(s): Allevains, Allevaines
- Time zone: UTC+01:00 (CET)
  - Summer (DST): UTC+02:00 (CEST)
- INSEE/Postal code: 74004 /74540
- ^{1} French Land Register data, which excludes lakes, ponds, glaciers > 1 km^{2} (0.386 sq mi or 247 acres) and river estuaries.

Allèves (French pronunciation: [alɛv]; Savoyard: Alève) is a commune in the Haute-Savoie department in the Auvergne-Rhône-Alpes region in south-eastern France.

== Geography ==
The village is located above the right bank of the Chéran, which forms the commune's southern border.

== See also ==
- Communes of the Haute-Savoie department
