= Chainaz-les-Frasses =

Chainaz-les-Frasses Shènâ (Savoyard)
- Commune
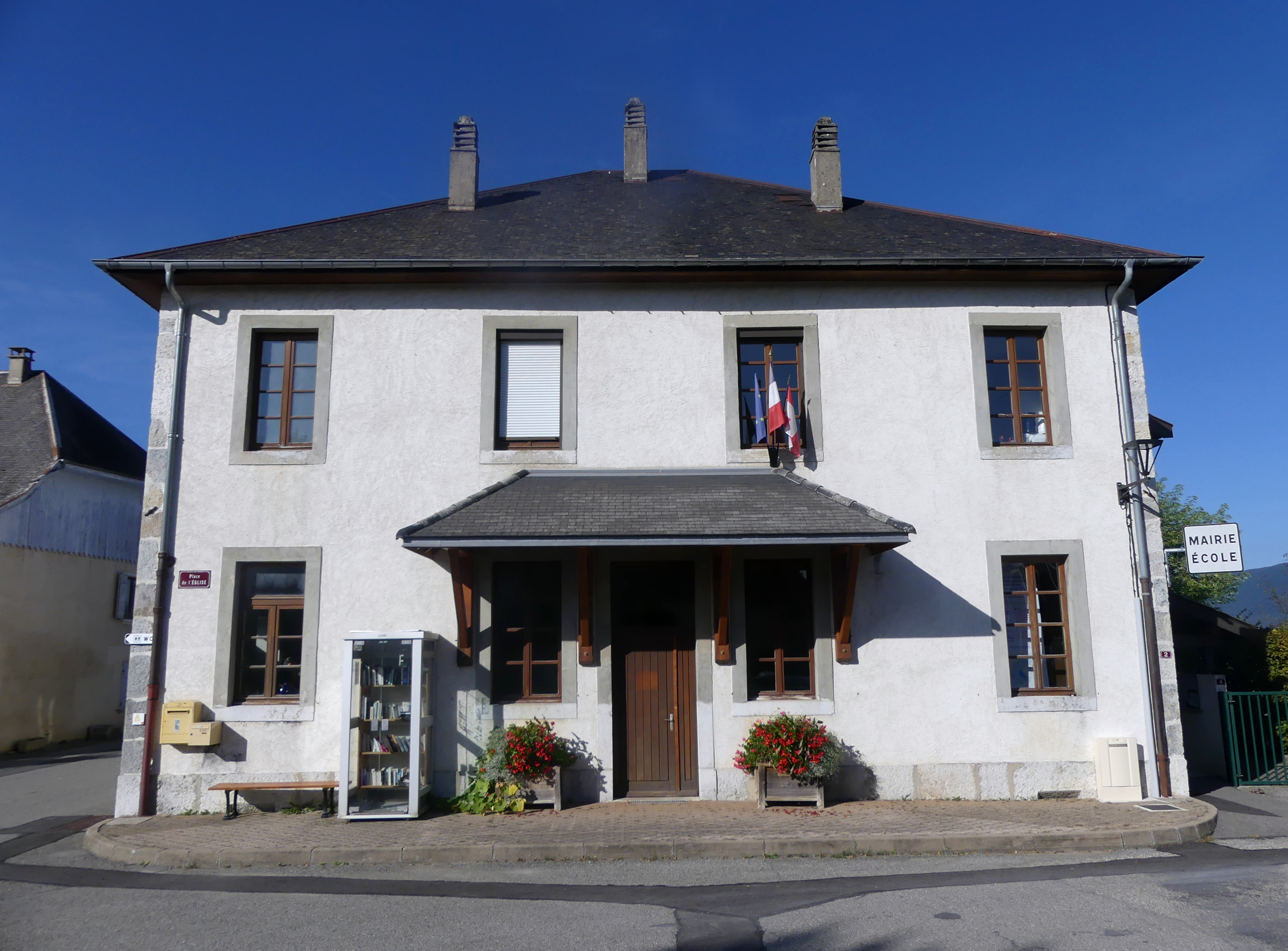
- Town hall
- Location of Chainaz-les-Frasses
- Location within France Location within Auvergne-Rhône-Alpes
- Coordinates: 45°46′26″N 5°59′46″E
- Country: France
- Region: Auvergne-Rhône-Alpes
- Department: Haute-Savoie
- Arrondissement: Annecy
- Canton: Rumilly
- Intercommunality: CA Grand Annecy

Government
  - Mayor (2020–2026): Gilles Viviant
- Area^{1}: 5.57 km^{2} (2.15 sq mi)
- Highest elevation: 725 m (2,379 ft)
- Lowest elevation: 420 m (1,380 ft)
- Population (2023): 681
  - Density: 122/km^{2} (317/sq mi)
- Time zone: UTC+01:00 (CET)
  - Summer (DST): UTC+02:00 (CEST)
- INSEE/Postal code: 74054 /74540
- ^{1} French Land Register data, which excludes lakes, ponds, glaciers > 1 km^{2} (0.386 sq mi or 247 acres) and river estuaries.

Chainaz-les-Frasses (French pronunciation: [ʃɛna le fʁas]; Savoyard: Shènâ) is a commune in the Haute-Savoie department in the Auvergne-Rhône-Alpes region in south-eastern France.

== See also ==
- Communes of the Haute-Savoie department
