= Moye =

- Commune
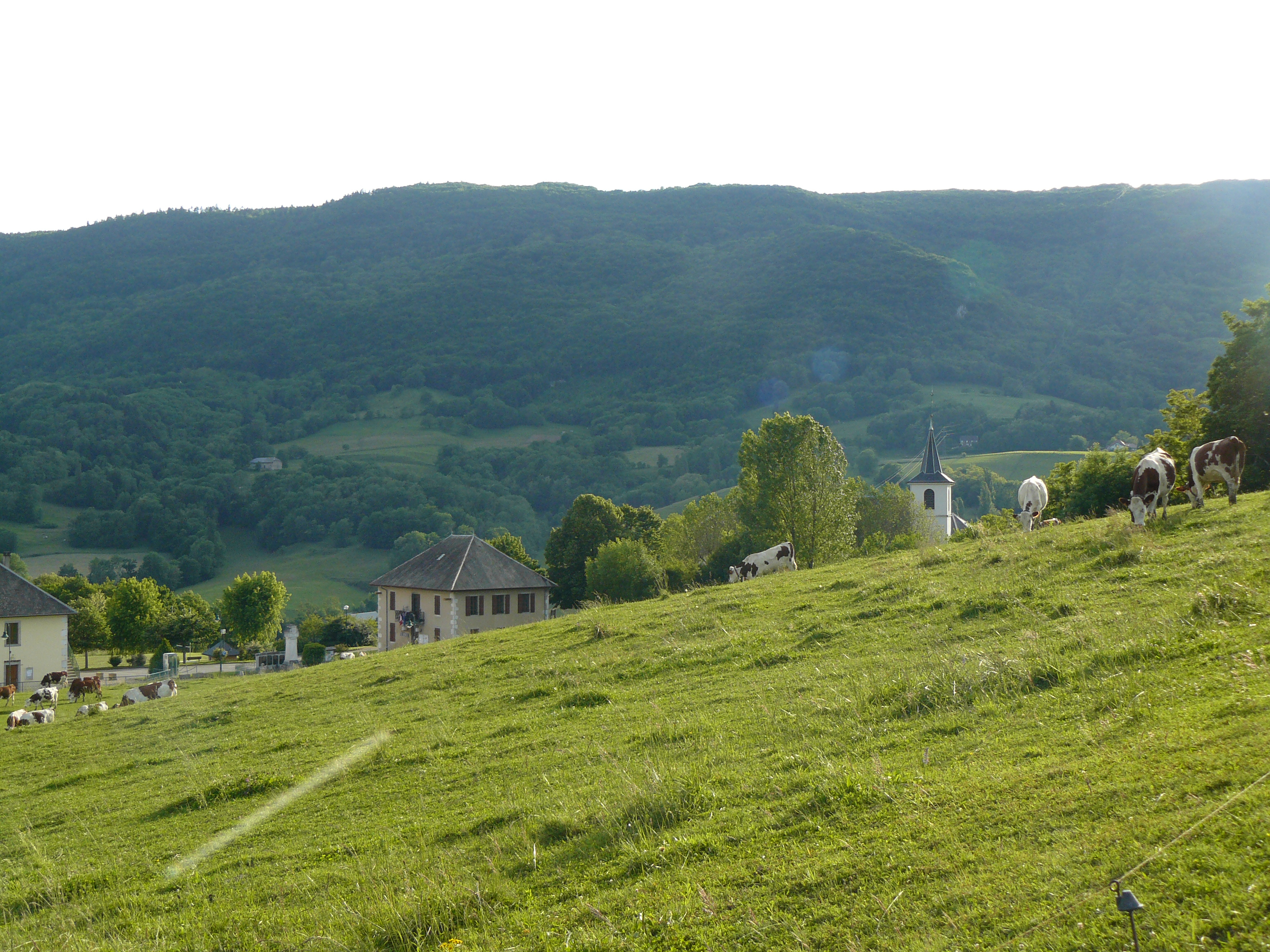
- The church and town hall from the hillside in Moye
- Location of Moye
- Location within France Location within Auvergne-Rhône-Alpes
- Coordinates: 45°52′38″N 5°54′46″E
- Country: France
- Region: Auvergne-Rhône-Alpes
- Department: Haute-Savoie
- Arrondissement: Annecy
- Canton: Rumilly
- Intercommunality: Rumilly Terre de Savoie

Government
  - Mayor (2020–2026): Martine Vibert
- Area^{1}: 23.8 km^{2} (9.2 sq mi)
- Highest elevation: 1,044 m (3,425 ft)
- Lowest elevation: 314 m (1,030 ft)
- Population (2023): 985
  - Density: 41.4/km^{2} (107/sq mi)
- Time zone: UTC+01:00 (CET)
  - Summer (DST): UTC+02:00 (CEST)
- INSEE/Postal code: 74192 /74150
- ^{1} French Land Register data, which excludes lakes, ponds, glaciers > 1 km^{2} (0.386 sq mi or 247 acres) and river estuaries.

Moye (French pronunciation: [mɔj]) is a commune in the Haute-Savoie department in the Auvergne-Rhône-Alpes region in south-eastern France.

== Geography ==
The Fier forms part of the commune's north-eastern border.

== See also ==
- Communes of the Haute-Savoie department
