= Nâves-Parmelan =

- Commune
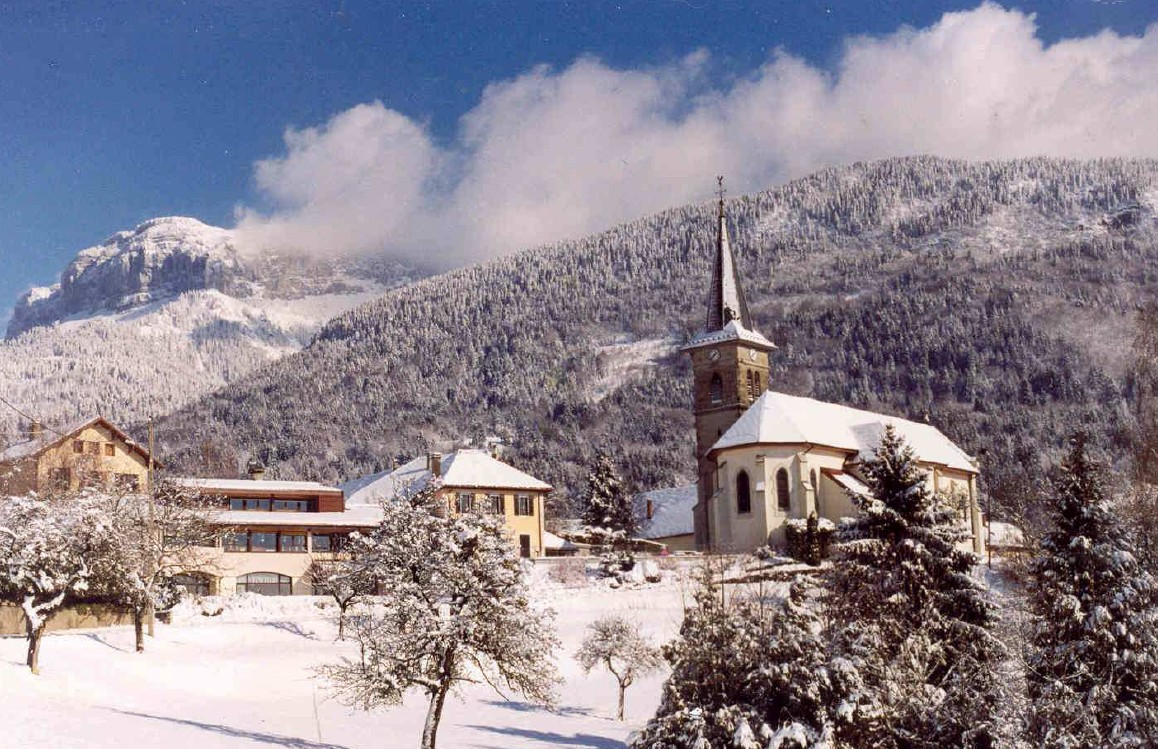
- Winter view of Nâves-Parmelan
- Location of Nâves-Parmelan
- Location within France Location within Auvergne-Rhône-Alpes
- Coordinates: 45°56′05″N 6°11′25″E
- Country: France
- Region: Auvergne-Rhône-Alpes
- Department: Haute-Savoie
- Arrondissement: Annecy
- Canton: Annecy-3
- Intercommunality: CA Grand Annecy

Government
  - Mayor (2020–2026): Christophe Poncet
- Area^{1}: 5.39 km^{2} (2.08 sq mi)
- Highest elevation: 1,281 m (4,203 ft)
- Lowest elevation: 480 m (1,570 ft)
- Population (2023): 1,000
  - Density: 190/km^{2} (480/sq mi)
- Time zone: UTC+01:00 (CET)
  - Summer (DST): UTC+02:00 (CEST)
- INSEE/Postal code: 74198 /74370
- Website: Navesparmelan.com
- ^{1} French Land Register data, which excludes lakes, ponds, glaciers > 1 km^{2} (0.386 sq mi or 247 acres) and river estuaries.

Nâves-Parmelan (French pronunciation: [nav paʁməlɑ̃]) is a commune in the Haute-Savoie department in the Auvergne-Rhône-Alpes region in south-eastern France.

== Geography ==
The river Fier forms the commune's south-western border.

== See also ==
- Communes of the Haute-Savoie department
