= Saint-Sylvestre, Haute-Savoie =

Saint-Sylvestre
- Commune
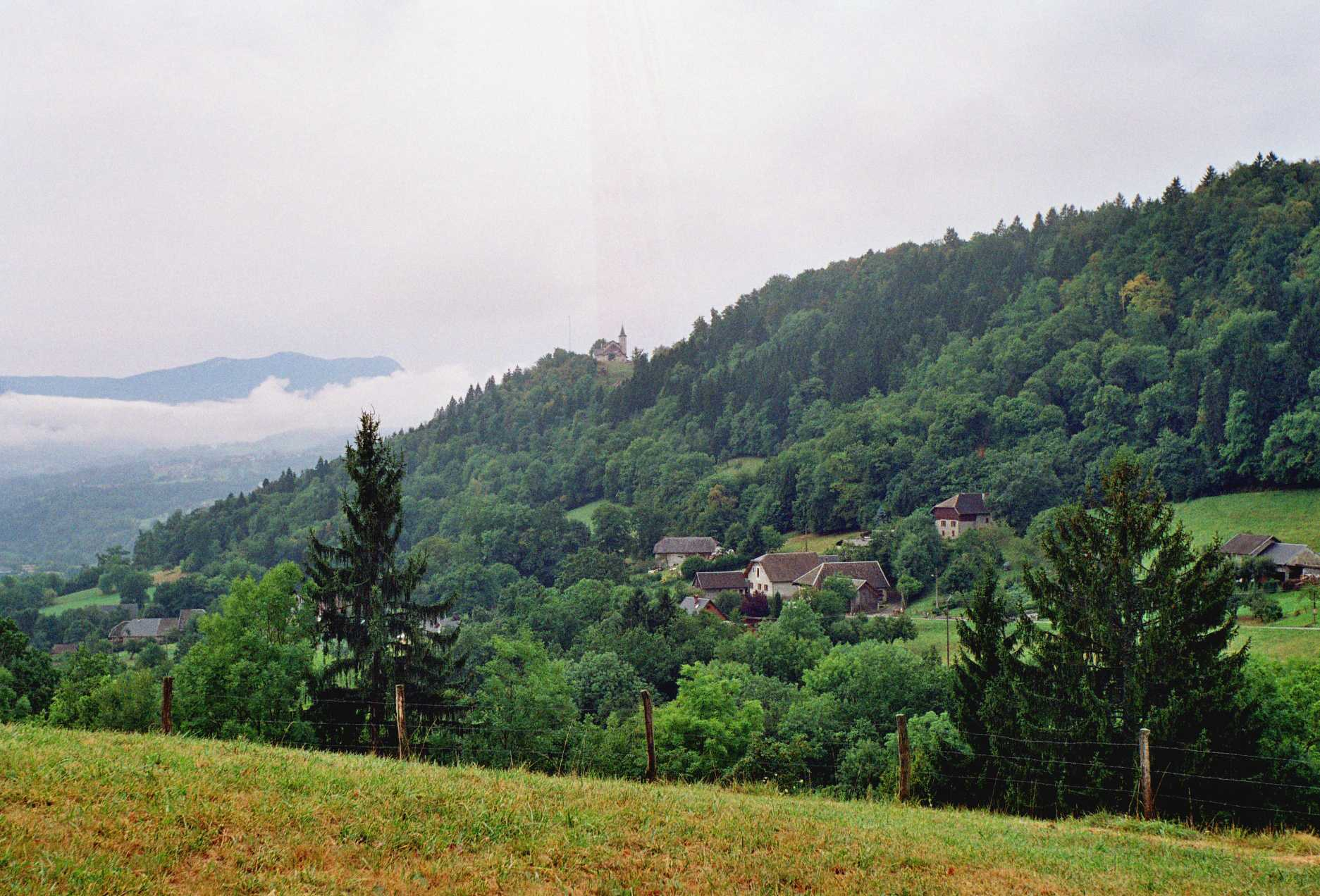
- Le Crêt and Champollier seen from Chapeiry
- Location of Saint-Sylvestre
- Location within France Location within Auvergne-Rhône-Alpes
- Coordinates: 45°50′18″N 6°01′11″E
- Country: France
- Region: Auvergne-Rhône-Alpes
- Department: Haute-Savoie
- Arrondissement: Annecy
- Canton: Rumilly
- Intercommunality: CA Grand Annecy

Government
  - Mayor (2023–2026): Josette Charvier
- Area^{1}: 5.34 km^{2} (2.06 sq mi)
- Highest elevation: 688 m (2,257 ft)
- Lowest elevation: 355 m (1,165 ft)
- Population (2023): 595
  - Density: 111/km^{2} (289/sq mi)
- Demonym: Saint-Sylvestrins
- Time zone: UTC+01:00 (CET)
  - Summer (DST): UTC+02:00 (CEST)
- INSEE/Postal code: 74254 /74540
- ^{1} French Land Register data, which excludes lakes, ponds, glaciers > 1 km^{2} (0.386 sq mi or 247 acres) and river estuaries.

Saint-Sylvestre (French pronunciation: [sɛ̃ silvɛstʁ]; Arpitan: Sant-Savétro) is a commune in the Haute-Savoie department in the Auvergne-Rhône-Alpes region in south-eastern France.

== Geography ==
The Chéran forms the commune's southern border.

== Demography ==
Historical population
Year	Pop.	±% p.a.
1968	315	—
1975	321	+0.27%
1982	340	+0.82%
1990	378	+1.33%
1999	511	+3.41%
2007	590	+1.81%
2012	598	+0.27%
2017	607	+0.30%
2023	595	−0.33%
Source: INSEE

== See also ==
- Communes of the Haute-Savoie department
