= Cusy =

- Commune
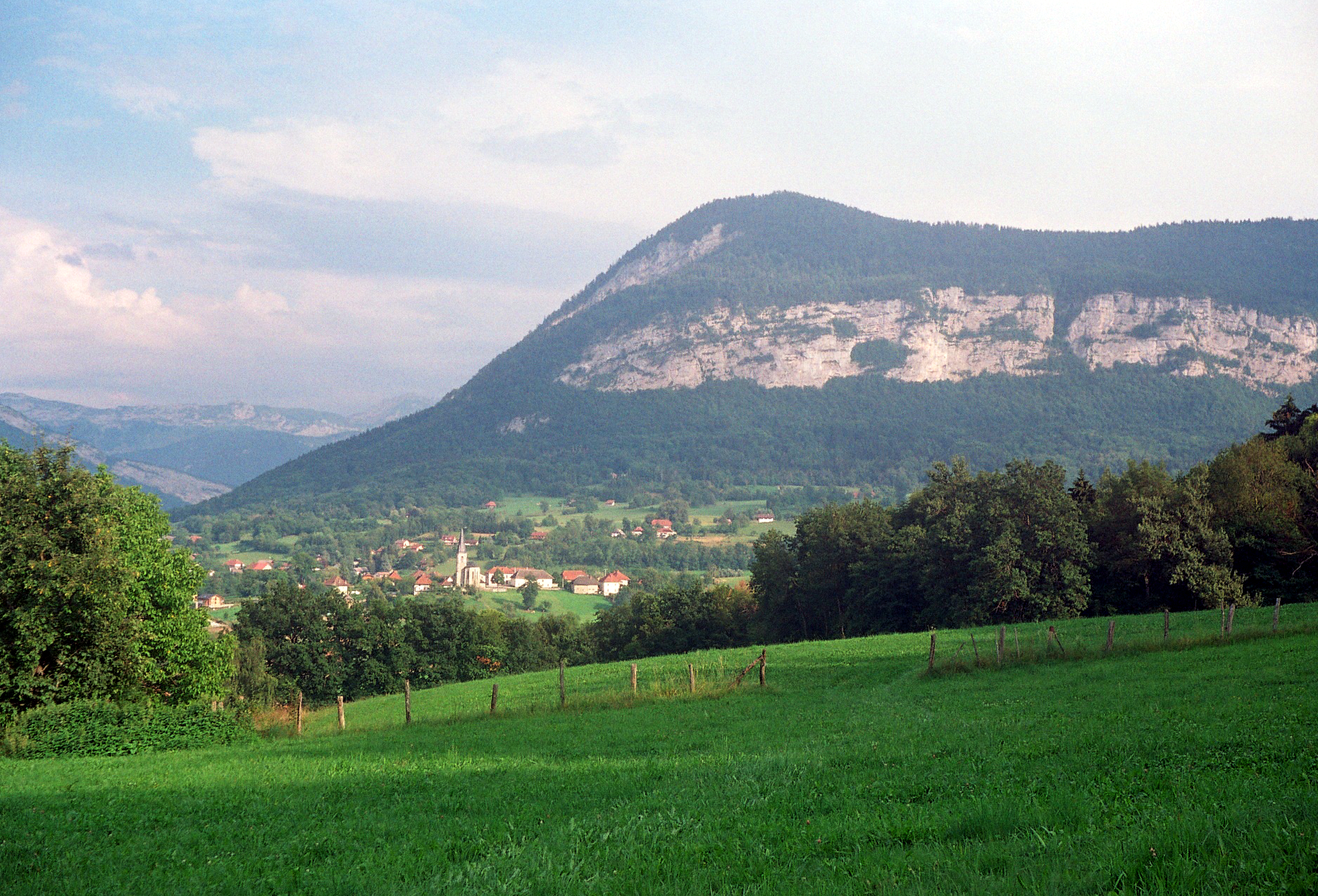
- A general view of Cusy

- Coat of arms
- Location of Cusy
- Location within France Location within Auvergne-Rhône-Alpes
- Coordinates: 45°45′57″N 6°01′53″E
- Country: France
- Region: Auvergne-Rhône-Alpes
- Department: Haute-Savoie
- Arrondissement: Annecy
- Canton: Rumilly
- Intercommunality: CA Grand Annecy

Government
  - Mayor (2020–2026): Patricia Mermoz
- Area^{1}: 17.43 km^{2} (6.73 sq mi)
- Highest elevation: 1,365 m (4,478 ft)
- Lowest elevation: 420 m (1,380 ft)
- Population (2023): 1,842
  - Density: 105.7/km^{2} (273.7/sq mi)
- Demonym: Cusiard / Cusiarde
- Time zone: UTC+01:00 (CET)
  - Summer (DST): UTC+02:00 (CEST)
- INSEE/Postal code: 74097 /74540
- ^{1} French Land Register data, which excludes lakes, ponds, glaciers > 1 km^{2} (0.386 sq mi or 247 acres) and river estuaries.

Cusy (French pronunciation: [kysi]; Arpitan: Côsi) is a commune in the Haute-Savoie department in the Auvergne-Rhône-Alpes region in south-eastern France.

== Geography ==
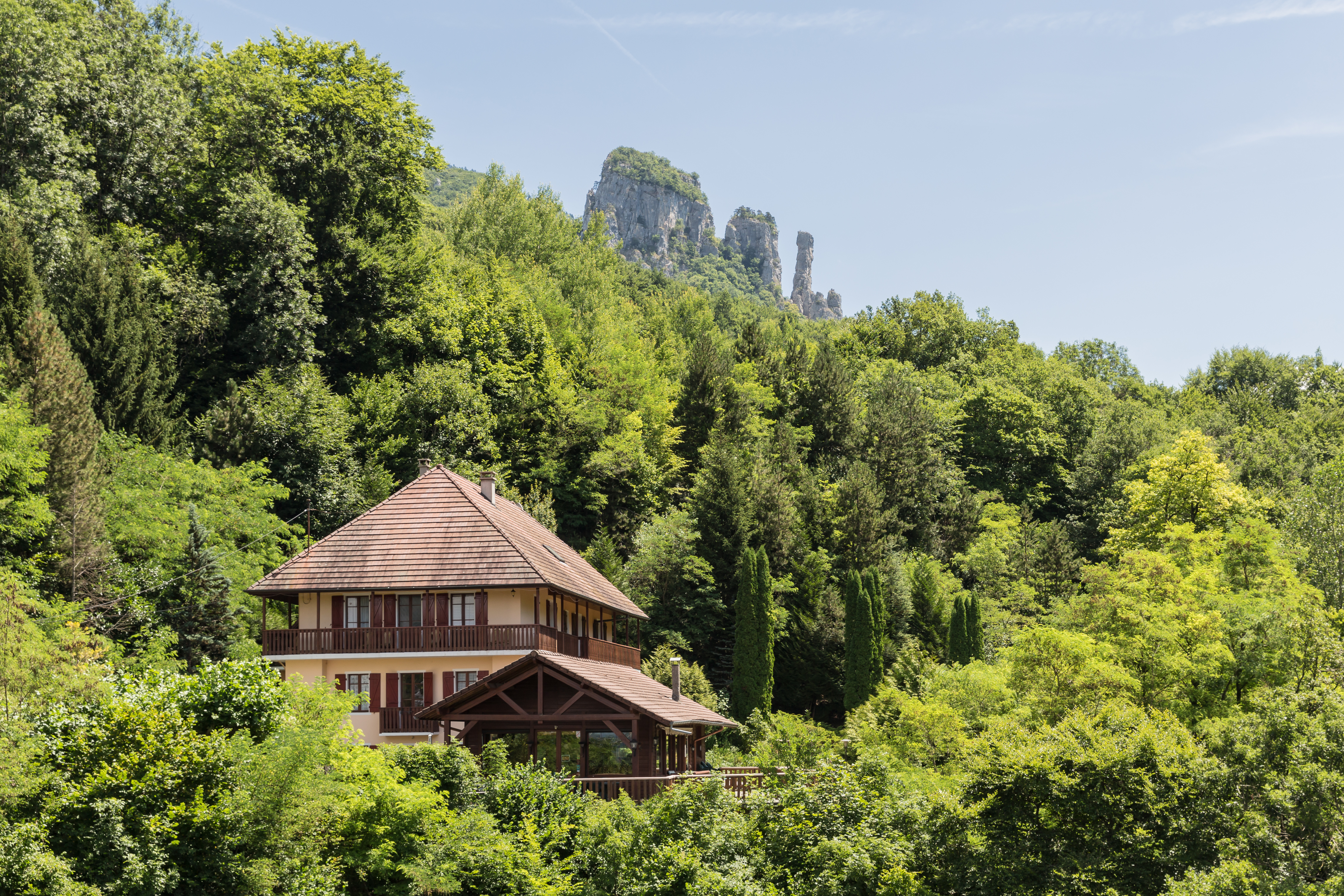

The Chéran forms the commune's north-eastern border.

== See also ==
- Communes of the Haute-Savoie department
