= Boussy, Haute-Savoie =

Boussy Bœci (Savoyard)
- Commune
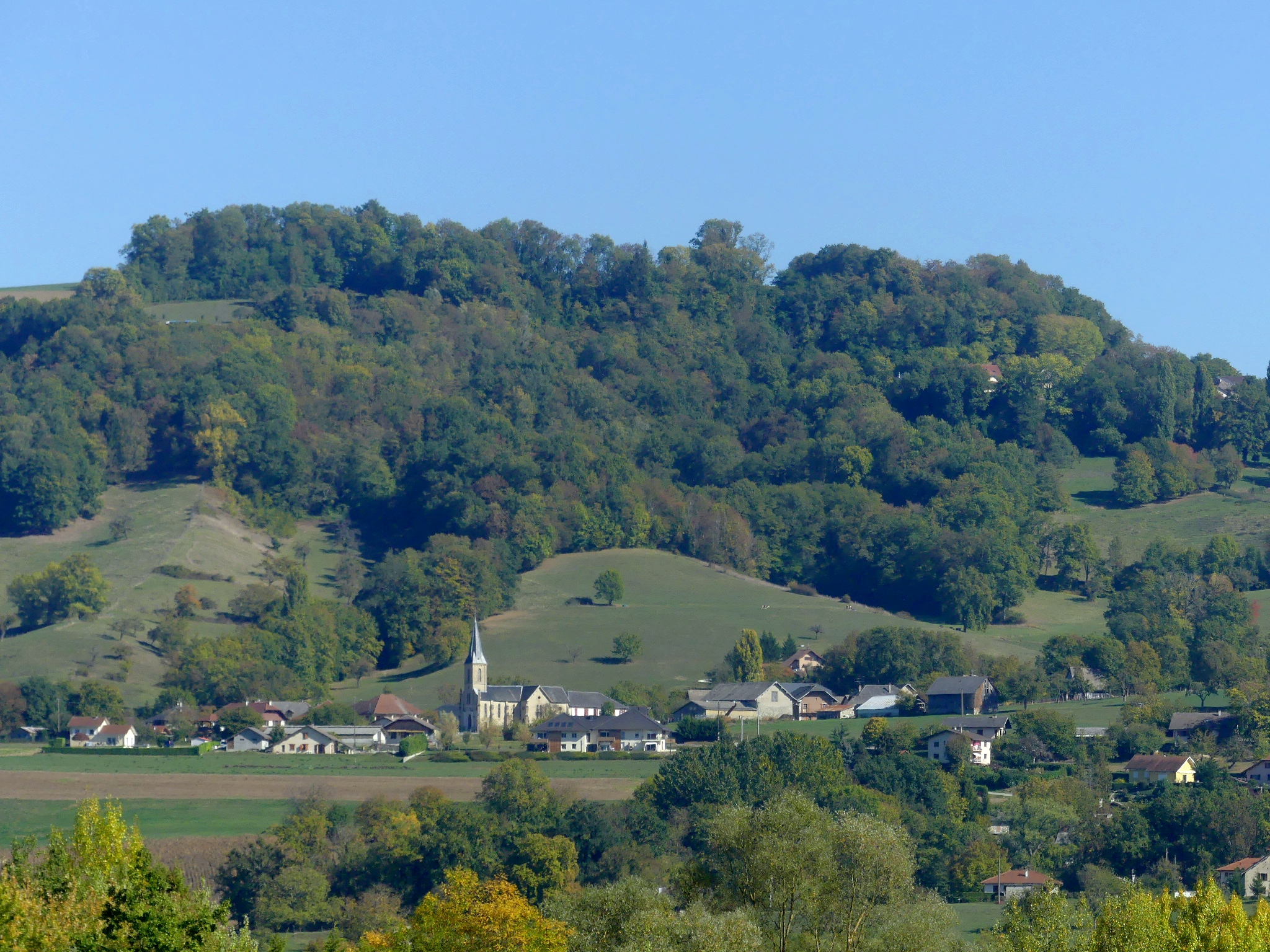
- Boussy seen from Rumilly.
- Location of Boussy
- Location within France Location within Auvergne-Rhône-Alpes
- Coordinates: 45°51′25″N 5°59′00″E
- Country: France
- Region: Auvergne-Rhône-Alpes
- Department: Haute-Savoie
- Arrondissement: Annecy
- Canton: Rumilly
- Intercommunality: Rumilly Terre de Savoie

Government
  - Mayor (2020–2026): Sylvia Roupioz
- Area^{1}: 5.23 km^{2} (2.02 sq mi)
- Highest elevation: 567 m (1,860 ft)
- Lowest elevation: 326 m (1,070 ft)
- Population (2023): 506
  - Density: 96.7/km^{2} (251/sq mi)
- Demonym: Boussignols
- Time zone: UTC+01:00 (CET)
  - Summer (DST): UTC+02:00 (CEST)
- INSEE/Postal code: 74046 /74150
- ^{1} French Land Register data, which excludes lakes, ponds, glaciers > 1 km^{2} (0.386 sq mi or 247 acres) and river estuaries.

Boussy (French pronunciation: [busi]; Savoyard: Bœci) is a commune in the Haute-Savoie department in the Auvergne-Rhône-Alpes region in south-eastern France.

== Geography ==
The Chéran forms the commune's south-western border.

== See also ==
- Communes of the Haute-Savoie department
