= Saint-Eusèbe, Haute-Savoie =

Saint-Eusèbe
- Commune
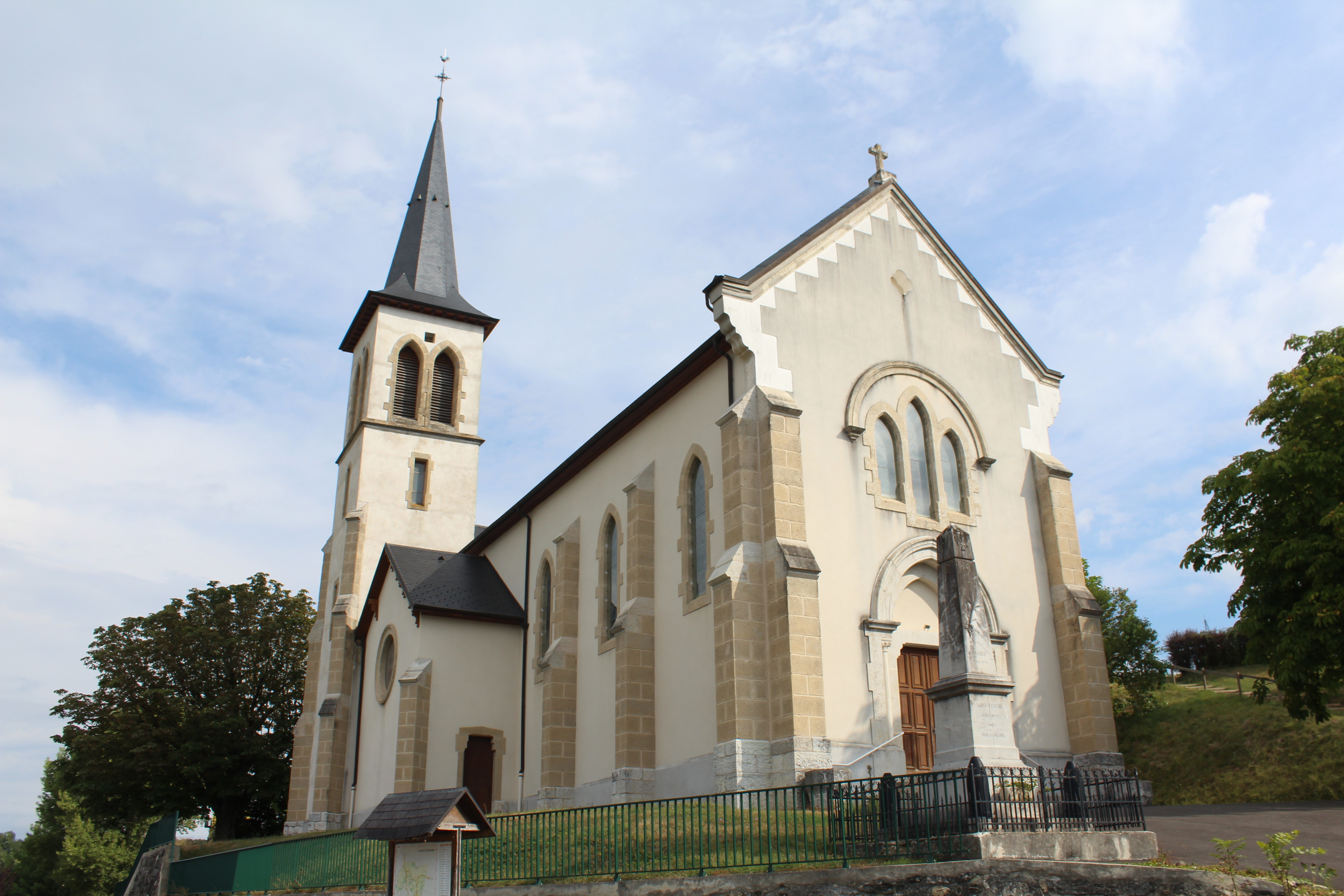
- Church of Saint-Eusèbe
- Location of Saint-Eusèbe
- Location within France Location within Auvergne-Rhône-Alpes
- Coordinates: 45°55′50″N 5°57′48″E
- Country: France
- Region: Auvergne-Rhône-Alpes
- Department: Haute-Savoie
- Arrondissement: Annecy
- Canton: Rumilly
- Intercommunality: Rumilly Terre de Savoie

Government
  - Mayor (2020–2026): Jean-François Perissoud
- Area^{1}: 6.88 km^{2} (2.66 sq mi)
- Highest elevation: 691 m (2,267 ft)
- Lowest elevation: 359 m (1,178 ft)
- Population (2023): 633
  - Density: 92.0/km^{2} (238/sq mi)
- Time zone: UTC+01:00 (CET)
  - Summer (DST): UTC+02:00 (CEST)
- INSEE/Postal code: 74231 /74150
- ^{1} French Land Register data, which excludes lakes, ponds, glaciers > 1 km^{2} (0.386 sq mi or 247 acres) and river estuaries.

Saint-Eusèbe (French pronunciation: [sɛ̃.t‿øzɛb]; Arpitan: Sant-Rozho) is a commune in the Haute-Savoie department in the Auvergne-Rhône-Alpes region in south-eastern France.

== See also ==
- Communes of the Haute-Savoie department
