= Versonnex, Haute-Savoie =

Versonnex
- Commune
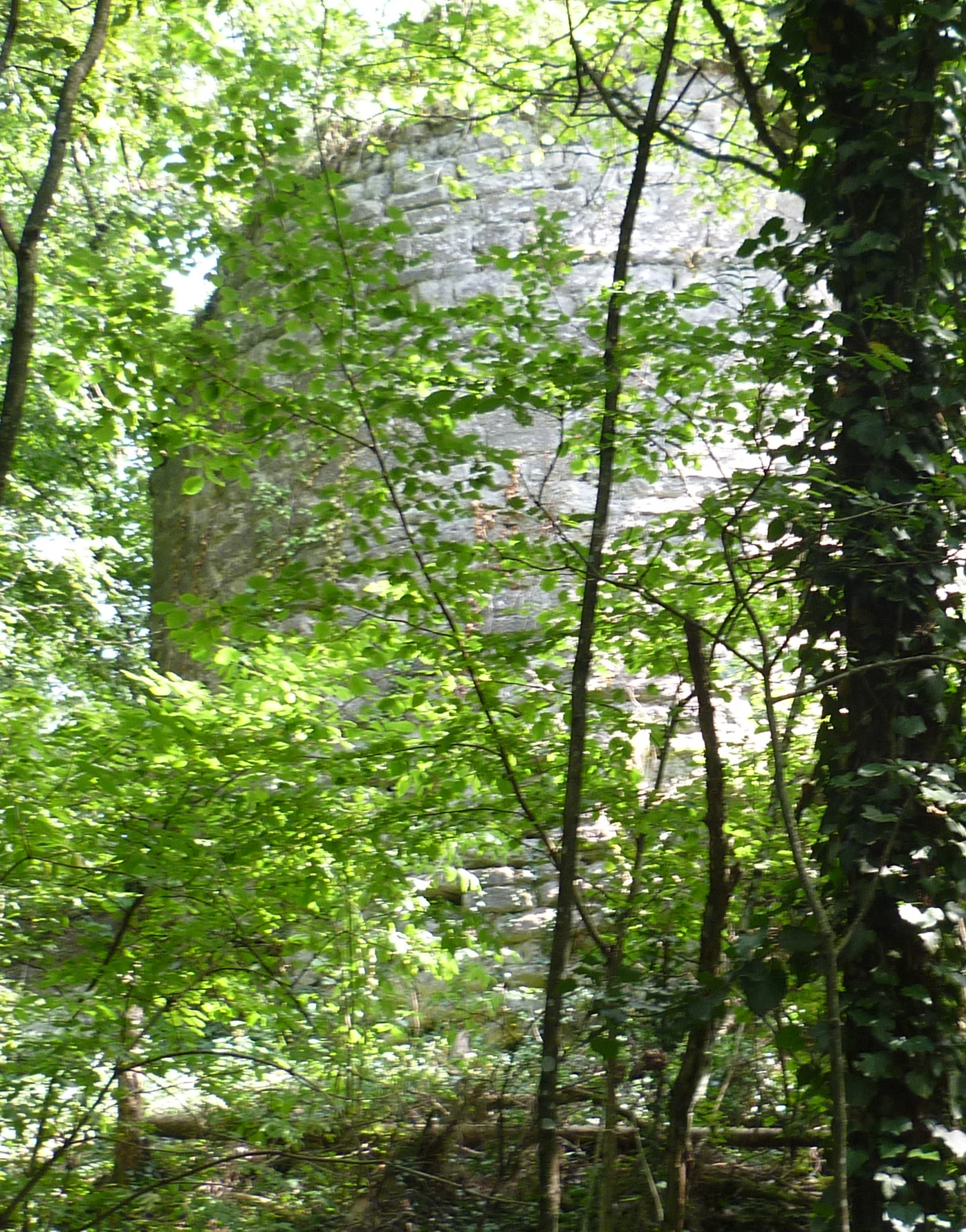
- The ruins of the Château of Crête
- Location of Versonnex
- Location within France Location within Auvergne-Rhône-Alpes
- Coordinates: 45°55′48″N 5°55′38″E
- Country: France
- Region: Auvergne-Rhône-Alpes
- Department: Haute-Savoie
- Arrondissement: Annecy
- Canton: Rumilly
- Intercommunality: Rumilly Terre de Savoie

Government
  - Mayor (2020–2026): Marie Givel
- Area^{1}: 4.18 km^{2} (1.61 sq mi)
- Highest elevation: 563 m (1,847 ft)
- Lowest elevation: 335 m (1,099 ft)
- Population (2023): 714
  - Density: 171/km^{2} (442/sq mi)
- Time zone: UTC+01:00 (CET)
  - Summer (DST): UTC+02:00 (CEST)
- INSEE/Postal code: 74297 /74150
- ^{1} French Land Register data, which excludes lakes, ponds, glaciers > 1 km^{2} (0.386 sq mi or 247 acres) and river estuaries.

Versonnex is a commune in the Haute-Savoie department of the Auvergne-Rhône-Alpes region in south-eastern France.

== See also ==
- Communes of the Haute-Savoie department
