= Canton of Rumilly =

Coordinates: 45.87°N 5.94°E

The canton of Rumilly is an administrative division of the Haute-Savoie department, southeastern France. Its borders were modified at the French canton reorganisation which came into effect in March 2015. Its seat is in Rumilly.

It consists of the following communes:

1. Alby-sur-Chéran
2. Allèves
3. Bloye
4. Boussy
5. Chainaz-les-Frasses
6. Chapeiry
7. Crempigny-Bonneguête
8. Cusy
9. Étercy
10. Gruffy
11. Hauteville-sur-Fier
12. Héry-sur-Alby
13. Lornay
14. Marcellaz-Albanais
15. Marigny-Saint-Marcel
16. Massingy
17. Moye
18. Mûres
19. Rumilly
20. Saint-Eusèbe
21. Saint-Félix
22. Saint-Sylvestre
23. Sales
24. Thusy
25. Vallières-sur-Fier
26. Vaulx
27. Versonnex
28. Viuz-la-Chiésaz
