= Crempigny-Bonneguête =

- Commune
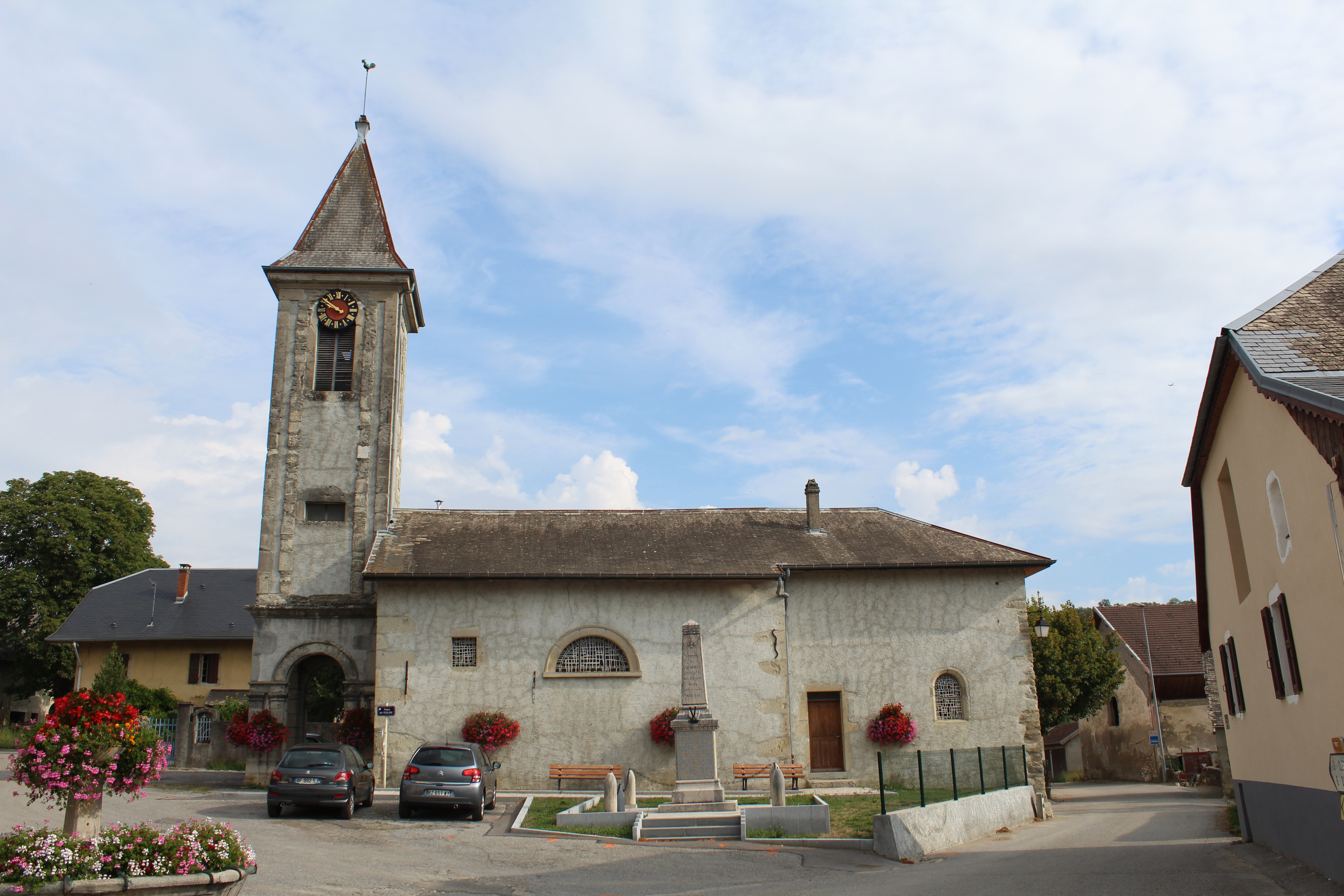
- Saint-Quentin church
- Location of Crempigny-Bonneguête
- Location within France Location within Auvergne-Rhône-Alpes
- Coordinates: 45°57′09″N 5°54′13″E
- Country: France
- Region: Auvergne-Rhône-Alpes
- Department: Haute-Savoie
- Arrondissement: Annecy
- Canton: Rumilly
- Intercommunality: Rumilly Terre de Savoie

Government
  - Mayor (2024–2026): Justine Zamparo
- Area^{1}: 5.82 km^{2} (2.25 sq mi)
- Highest elevation: 857 m (2,812 ft)
- Lowest elevation: 340 m (1,120 ft)
- Population (2023): 325
  - Density: 55.8/km^{2} (145/sq mi)
- Time zone: UTC+01:00 (CET)
  - Summer (DST): UTC+02:00 (CEST)
- INSEE/Postal code: 74095 /74150
- ^{1} French Land Register data, which excludes lakes, ponds, glaciers > 1 km^{2} (0.386 sq mi or 247 acres) and river estuaries.

Crempigny-Bonneguête (French pronunciation: [kʁɑ̃piɲi bɔnɡɛt]; Arpitan: Krinpnyi-Bonaguéta) is a commune in the Haute-Savoie department in the Auvergne-Rhône-Alpes region in south-eastern France.

== See also ==
- Communes of the Haute-Savoie department
