= Pays de Faverges =

Natural region in Haute-Savoie, France

- Natural region
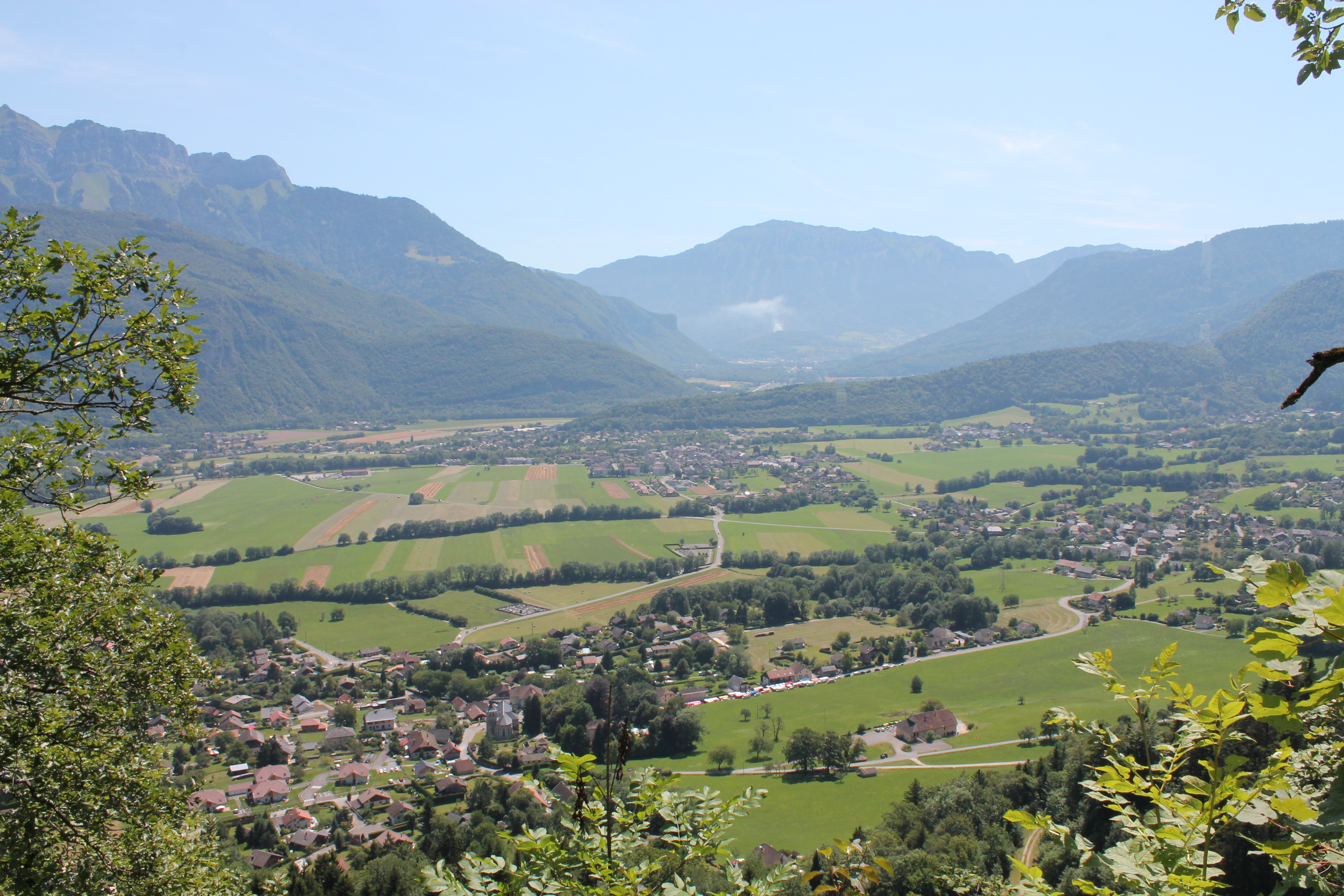
- Faverges Valley, viewed from the oratory of Entrevernes, with the summit of La Belle Étoile (1841 m) in the background.
- Interactive map of Pays de Faverges
- Coordinates: 45°44′N 6°17′E
- Country: France
- Region: Auvergne-Rhône-Alpes
- Department: Haute-Savoie
- Communes: Faverges-Seythenex, Doussard, Giez, Chevaline, Lathuile, Saint-Ferréol, Val de Chaise
- Main town: Faverges-Seythenex

Area
  - Total: 571.93 km^{2} (220.82 sq mi)
- Geology: Annecy Trough
- Topography: Bauges Massif, Bornes Massif (Alps)
- Water bodies: Eau Morte, Chaise

The Pays de Faverges or Faverges Valley is a small natural region located south of Lake Annecy in the Haute-Savoie department of the Auvergne-Rhône-Alpes region. It forms the central part of the Annecy Basin, surrounded by the Bauges Massif to the south, the Bornes Massif to the north, and the eastern end of the Aravis Range. The Pays de Faverges is a Savoyard region within the Canton of Faverges-Seythenex, 2nd constituency of Haute-Savoie, Annecy Arrondissement, and Haute-Savoie department.

== Geography ==
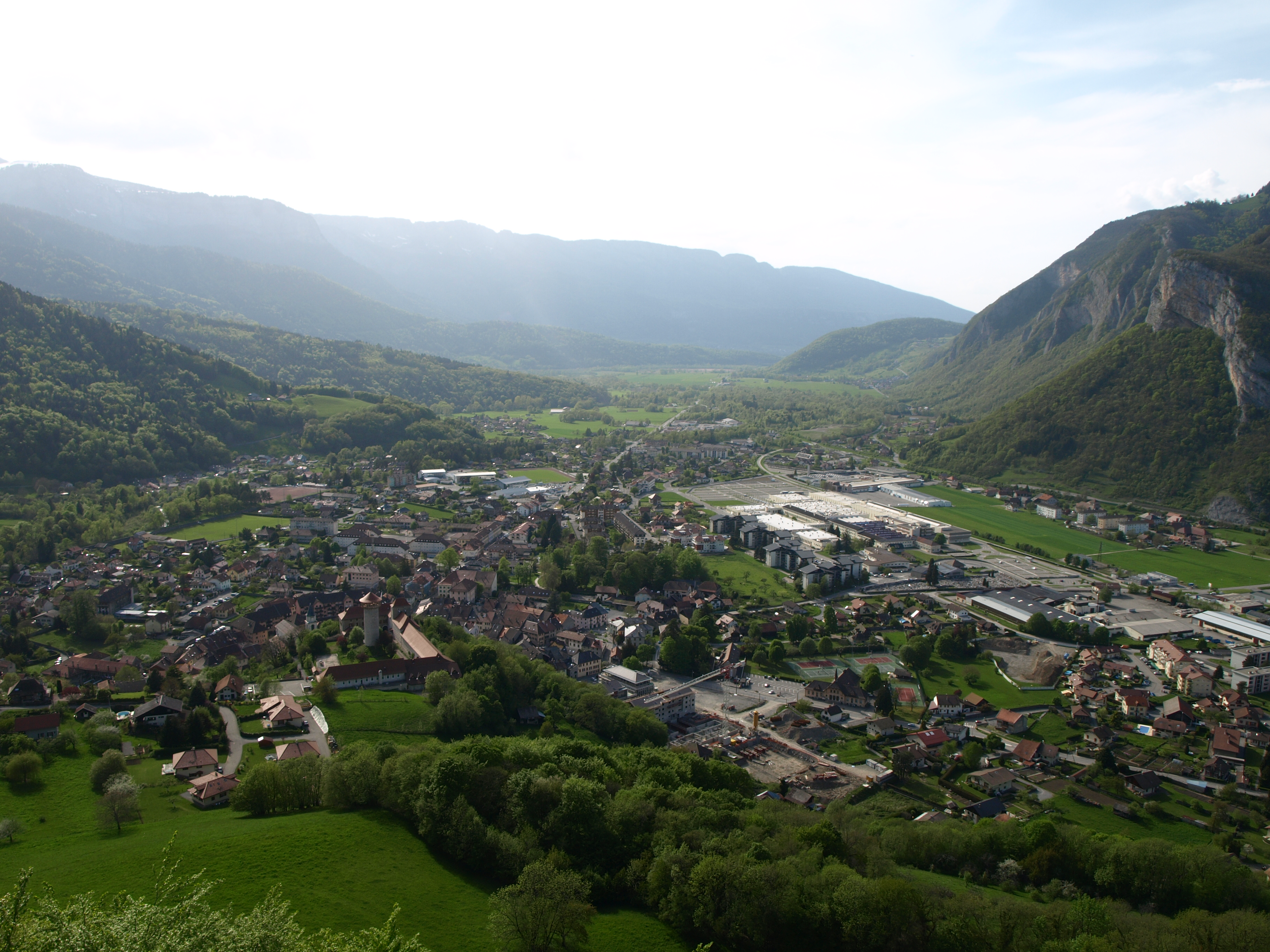
Town and Pays de Faverges, facing Lake Annecy.

=== Location ===
The Pays de Faverges is a valley situated upstream of the cluse and Lake Annecy, also known as the Faverges Valley. It is a distinct subregion within the broader Annecy Basin. (Note: The Annecy Basin comprises distinct territories: the Annecy Agglomeration, the Pays du Laudon (also called Lake Shores), the Pays de Faverges, the Thônes Valley, and the Aravis.) The area spans approximately 12 kilometres (7.5 mi) east to west and 14 kilometres (8.7 mi) north to south. Geographer Raoul Blanchard described it as "a deep, narrow, and winding valley, the true archetype of a mountain valley," contrasting it with the larger intra-Alpine valleys of the foreland.

The Faverges Valley is a basin or depression formed by the Annecy-Ugine glacial trough, sometimes referred to as the "Faverges Trough" for this section. Its flat valley floor constitutes an alluvial plain. Near Faverges, the valley narrows into a cluse. Elevations range from approximately 470 metres (1,540 ft) on the western edges to about 500 metres (1,600 ft) on the opposite slopes. From certain vantage points in the commune, the peak of Mont Blanc is visible to the northeast.

Primarily situated on the plain and slopes of the surrounding massifs, except for the commune of Montmin, the valley is traversed by two mountain streams: the Saint-Ruph (or Eau Morte), originating in the Bauges Massif to the west and flowing into Lake Annecy to the north, and the Chaise, originating in the Bornes Massif to the east and joining the Arly river in Ugine, in the neighboring Savoie department.

The main peaks of this subregion include La Tournette (2,351 metres (7,713 ft)), Pointe de la Sambuy (2,198 metres (7,211 ft)), Mont Trélod (2,181 metres (7,156 ft)), Dent de Cons (2,062 metres (6,765 ft)), Pointe de la Beccaz (2,041 metres (6,696 ft)), and Crêt des Mouches (2,032 metres (6,667 ft)).

=== Communes ===
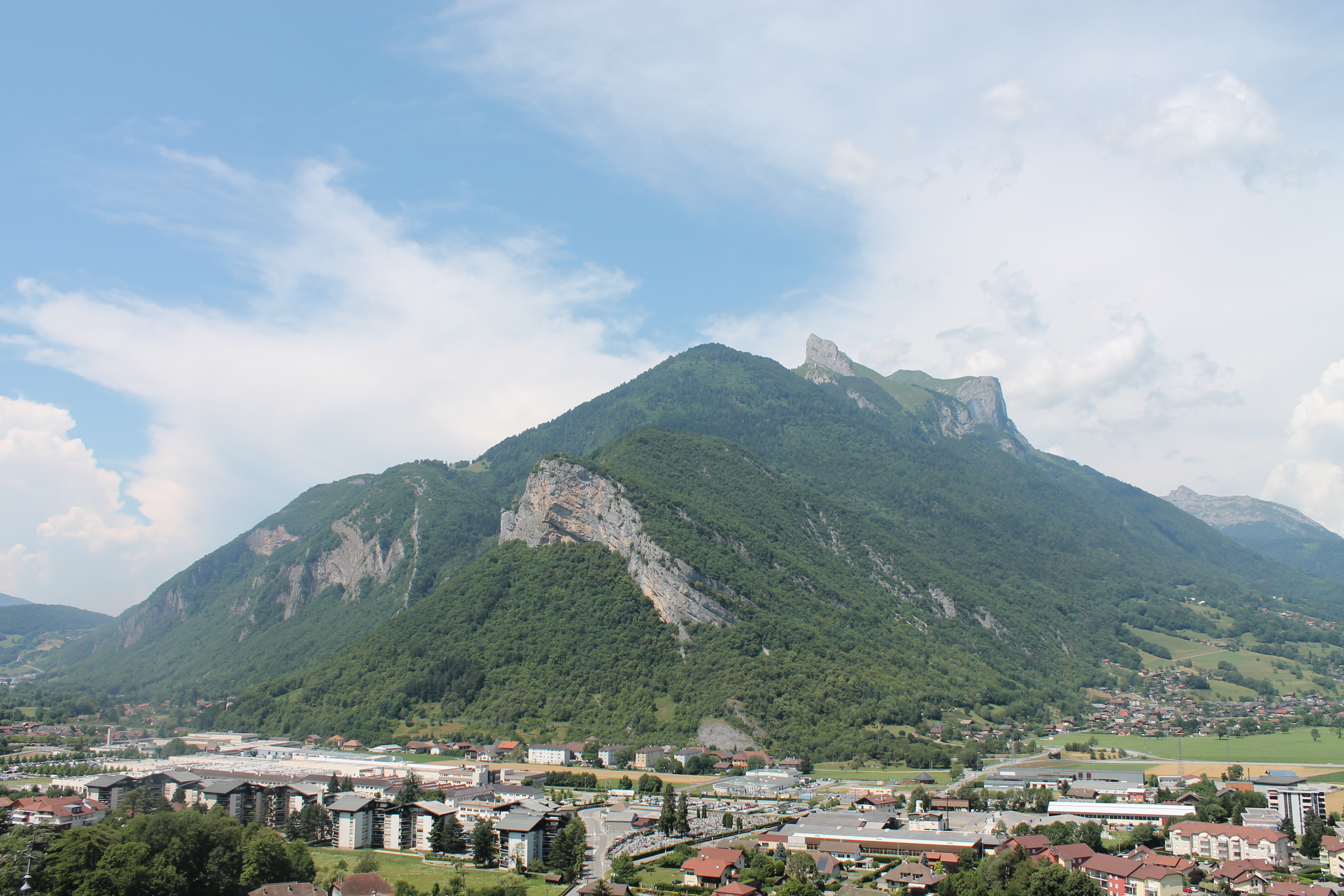
Foreground: Viuz industrial zone. Midground: Viuz rock, aligned with the Arpettaz summit. Background: Pointe de Chauriande (left, 1,803 metres (5,915 ft)) and Arclozan (right). Between them lies Crêt des Mouches (2,033 metres (6,670 ft)).

The Pays de Faverges is administratively centered around the Communauté de communes des Sources du Lac d'Annecy, comprising seven communes, plus the village of Montmin, merged with Talloires in 2016 to form Talloires-Montmin, all within the Canton of Faverges-Seythenex.

Communes of the Communauté de communes des Sources du Lac d'Annecy
Name	INSEE code	Demonym	Area (km²)	Population (2014)	Density (pop./km²)
Faverges-Seythenex ^{†}	74123		59.27	7,611	128
Doussard	74104	Doussardiens	20.14	3,607	179
Giez	74135	Gicans	12.65	561	44
Chevaline	74072	Chevalinois	14.16	204	14
Lathuile	74147	Lathuiliens	8.76	1,009	115
Saint-Ferréol	74234	Saint-Ferréoliens	16.79	817	49
Val de Chaise	74167		18.70	1,305	70
^{†} Seat of the intercommunality

=== Transport ===
The valley is crossed by the former RN508, now D1508, connecting north to Annecy (approx. 40 minutes (2,400 s)) and south to Albertville (approx. 25 minutes (1,500 s)) via Ugine (approx. 20 minutes (1,200 s)). A bypass skirts Faverges’ town center to the north, established in 1993. Southward, the A41 autoroute is accessible 19 kilometres (12 mi) away at the Albertville exit, leading to Tarentaise Valley ski resorts or the Combe de Savoie, connecting to the Maurienne valley or the cities of Chambéry and Grenoble. Northward, through Annecy, the A430 autoroute is reachable (Annecy-South exit at 25 kilometres (16 mi) or Annecy-North at 28 kilometres (17 mi)), linking to the Arve Valley to the east or Chambéry via Aix-les-Bains to the west. The A40 autoroute, known as the "White Motorway," can be accessed via the former RN508 toward Frangy.

The D1508 sees approximately 8,100 vehicles daily, with heavy goods vehicles accounting for about 85% of traffic.

From Annecy, connections are available to the rail network at Annecy station’s multimodal platform or to flights from Annecy–Haute-Savoie–Mont Blanc Airport (25 kilometres (16 mi)) in Meythet. For international flights, options include Lyon–Saint-Exupéry Airport (150 kilometres (93 mi), approx. 1h45) or the closer Geneva Airport in Switzerland (75 kilometres (47 mi), approx. 1h05).

A 30 kilometres (19 mi) cycle path, built on a former railway line along the D1508, runs between Annecy and Albertville, ending in Haute-Savoie at Marlens but extending into Savoie. The final section from Giez to Marlens was completed between 2004 and 2005. Managed by the Syndicat mixte du lac d'Annecy (SILA), this "Voie Verte" is one of France’s most popular cycle paths.

Boats from Doussard’s pier, operated by the Lake Annecy Cruise Company, offer three daily connections to Annecy.

== History ==
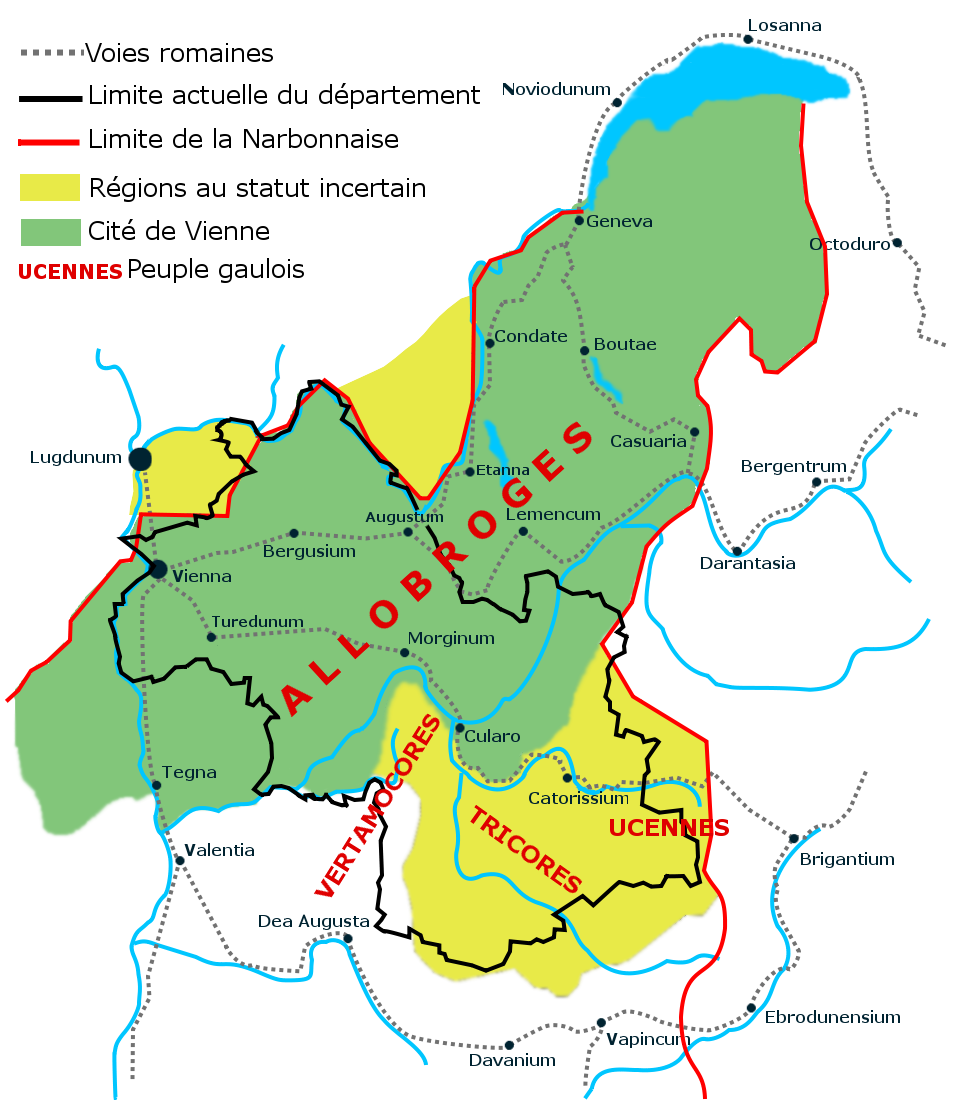
Territory of the Allobroges, with mention of Casuaria.

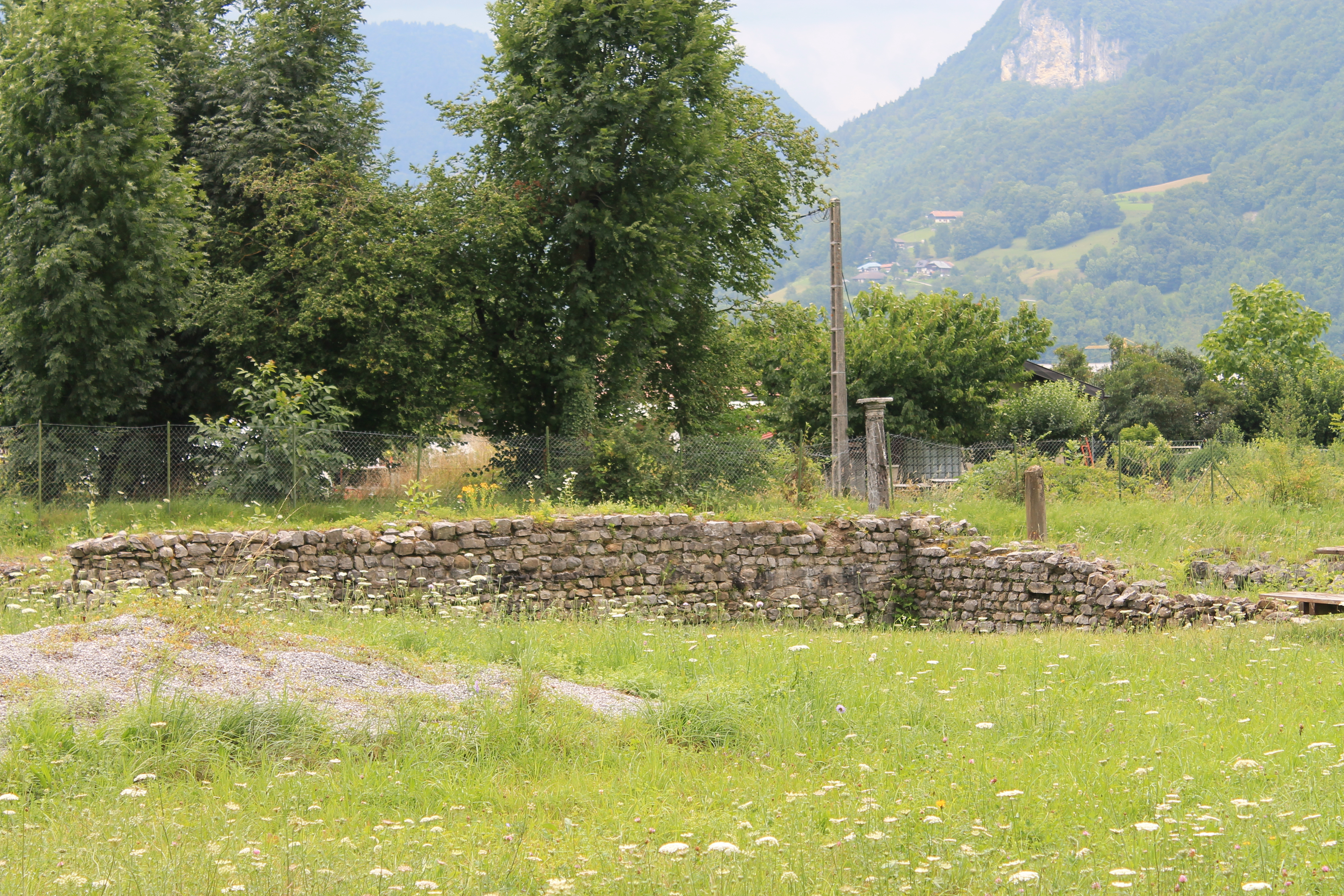
Ancient baths of Faverges.

The Faverges plain shows evidence of occupation from the Chalcolithic period. The Viuz-Faverges Archaeological Museum displays a copper axe from Englannaz (Doussard, Saint-Ferréol), dated to the "Copper Age," when stone tools were supplemented with worked copper.

The valley was part of the Allobroges territory, controlling the flat foreland between the Rhône and the Alps. The Romans intervened in the 2nd century BC, and after pacification, built a secondary road from Turin to Geneva via the mansio Casuaria (Viuz village, Faverges), which developed in the 1st century AD. This Roman road roughly followed the former RN508’s route. Traces have been found in nearby areas (Bredannaz, Bout-du-Lac, Faverges).

In 1016, King Rudolph III of Burgundy granted his wife, Queen Ermengarde, rights over Dulsatis (Doussard), Marsiacum (Marceau), Vesonam (Vesonne), and Marlendis (Marlens). Medieval records, such as the late 12th to early 13th-century cartulary of Talloires Abbey, mention local villages and parishes.

In the early Middle Ages, the valley was divided between regional powers: the seigneuries of Beauvivier, Verthier, and Lathuile, linked to the Duin family, belonged to the County of Geneva, while Giez and Faverges, with its keep controlling local roads, were vassals of the County of Savoy. By the late 14th century, Faverges was enfeoffed to the County of Geneva. It became a châtellenie encompassing Cons, Doussard, Giez, Marlens, and Saint-Ferréol. In 1401, Amadeus VIII, Duke of Savoy purchased the County of Geneva, diminishing Faverges’ strategic role.

From the late 18th century, Faverges developed proto-industry, particularly cotton and silk processing, led by the Duport family. The Dictionnaire du duché de Savoie (1840) notes that Viuz and Les Murets produced high-quality wine, unlike other local products.

In 1902, silk weaving revived with investments from Swiss industrialist Stünzi. In 1909, another Swiss firm, Stäubli, established a factory producing dobbies for weaving looms. In the early 1920s, Simon Tissot-Dupont, from Saint-Ferréol but based in Paris, founded an ST Dupont factory in Faverges.

== Administration ==
The Pays de Faverges is partly managed by the Communauté de communes des Sources du Lac d'Annecy, headquartered in Faverges-Seythenex.

== Economy ==
=== Agriculture ===
- Mountain agriculture: livestock, cheese, fodder, honey.

The region produces AOC cheeses such as Abondance, Reblochon, Chevrotin, and Tome des Bauges, alongside PGI products like Tomme de Savoie, Emmental de Savoie, and Savoy fruits (apples, pears).

=== Industry and commerce ===
- Small and medium industries in Faverges.
- Industrial jobs in Ugine and Albertville.
- Employment opportunities in Annecy and Geneva.
- Local crafts.

The Pays de Faverges supports a mix of small and medium industries, particularly in Faverges, with additional industrial employment in nearby Ugine and Albertville. Opportunities also exist in Annecy and Geneva, alongside a tradition of local craftsmanship.

=== Tourism ===
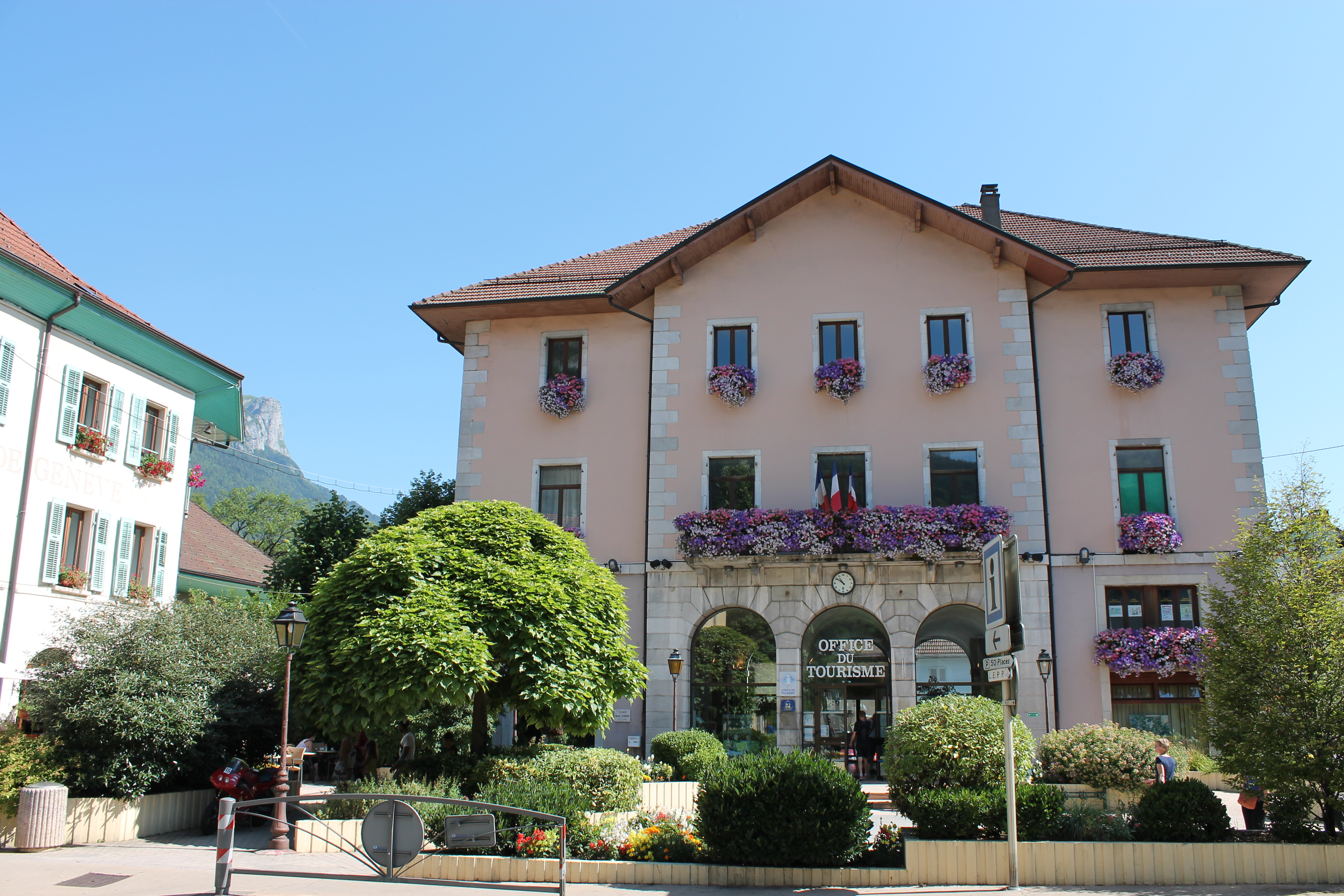
Former Faverges town hall, now the tourism office.

The Pays de Faverges is a tourism hub, leveraging its proximity to Lake Annecy (Doussard), ski resorts like La Sambuy-Seythenex, Val de Tamié, and Montmin, and local heritage (museums, castles). Tourism is promoted by the Communauté de communes des Sources du Lac d'Annecy’s tourism office, established in the 1980s in Faverges’ former town hall. The region offers around 12,300 tourist beds across approximately 50 establishments, with 50% in campsites. The Château de Faverges, acquired by the commune in 1980, serves as an associative holiday center with 400 beds and dining facilities. The Seythenex resort’s development in the 1980s was supported by a station-valley contract.

== Culture and heritage ==
Interactive map of Pays de Faverges: Monuments (castles, etc.) Religious sites (churches, etc.) Sports (golf, ski) Parks/Reserves Notable sites

=== Monuments, sites, and natural attractions ===
==== Museums ====
- Viuz-Faverges Archaeological Museum, adjacent to the Église Saint-Jean-Baptiste de Viuz, built on a former Roman temple.
- Butterfly and Insect Museum at the castle.

==== Architectural heritage ====
- Ancient baths of Faverges.
- Château de Faverges, Château de Gye, Château de Lathuile.
- Tamié Abbey, marking the border with the Savoie department.
- Pont sur l'Eau Morte.
- Tour de Beauvivier.
- Maison Blain.

==== Natural sites ====
- Col de la Forclaz, offering one of the finest views of Lake Annecy.
- Roc des Bœufs.
- Bout-du-Lac Nature Reserve.
- La Tournette mountain.
- Montagne du Charbon.
- Combe d'Ire.
- Seythenex Cave and Waterfall.

=== Sports and leisure activities ===
- Sports: Golf at Giez, paragliding at Col de la Forclaz, swimming and water sports on Lake Annecy, fishing in rivers and lakes, a 40 kilometres (25 mi) cycle path from Annecy to Albertville via Faverges, and hiking trails (Bauges: Orgeval, Belle Étoile; Tournette).
- Skiing: Snow fields at La Sambuy-Seythenex, Montmin, and Val de Tamié - Les Combes Nordic Domain.
- Nearby excursions: Lake Annecy, Talloires (9 kilometres (5.6 mi)), Annecy (20 kilometres (12 mi)), Albertville (14 kilometres (8.7 mi)), Combe de Savoie vineyards (30 kilometres (19 mi)), Isère Valley (20 kilometres (12 mi)), Megève (30 kilometres (19 mi)).
- Rallye du Pays de Faverges (30th edition in April 2014), with 150 teams across three circuits.

=== Cultural and sporting events ===
- Spring:
  - Faverges Trail Run (700 participants).
  - Troc’Collections.
  - Goat Festival (biennial).
  - Rallye du Pays de Faverges (30th edition, April 2014).
- Summer: Savoyard Book Biennial.
- Autumn: Postcard Fair.
- Winter: Tournette Sambuy Millet (TS Millet).

== See also ==
- Canton of Faverges-Seythenex
- Lake Annecy
- Bauges Massif
- Bornes Massif
- Aravis Range
- Allobroges
- Tamié Abbey
- La Tournette

== Bibliography ==
- Ramella-Pezza, Albert (2007). Le Bassin favergien [The Faverges Basin]. Mémoire en images (in French). Alan Sutton. p. 160. ISBN 978-2-84910-590-0.
- Duret, Michel (1998). Au Pays de Faverges [In the Pays de Faverges]. Mémoire en images (in French). Alan Sutton. p. 128. ISBN 978-2-84253-180-5.
- Duret, Michel (1991). Faverges et son canton : balade historique [Faverges and Its Canton: A Historical Stroll] (in French). Amis de Viuz-Faverges. p. 32.
- Pajani, Bernard (1982). Faverges et ses environs : un moment de son histoire, 1906, un aspect de sa vie [Faverges and Its Surroundings: A Moment in Its History, 1906, an Aspect of Its Life] (PDF) (in French). B. Pajani. p. 166. ASIN B0014KWCLA.
