= La Sambuy-Seythenex =

Ski resort in the French Alps

- Location within France Location within Auvergne-Rhône-Alpes Location within Alps
- Location: Faverges-Seythenex, Haute-Savoie, Auvergne-Rhône-Alpes, France
- Nearest city: Albertville
- Coordinates: 45°42′48″N 6°16′32″E
- Opened: 1960
- Closed: 2023
- Top elevation: 1,850 m (6,070 ft)
- Base elevation: 1,150 m (3,770 ft)
- Total length: 29.2 km (18.1 mi)
- Website: www.lasambuy.com

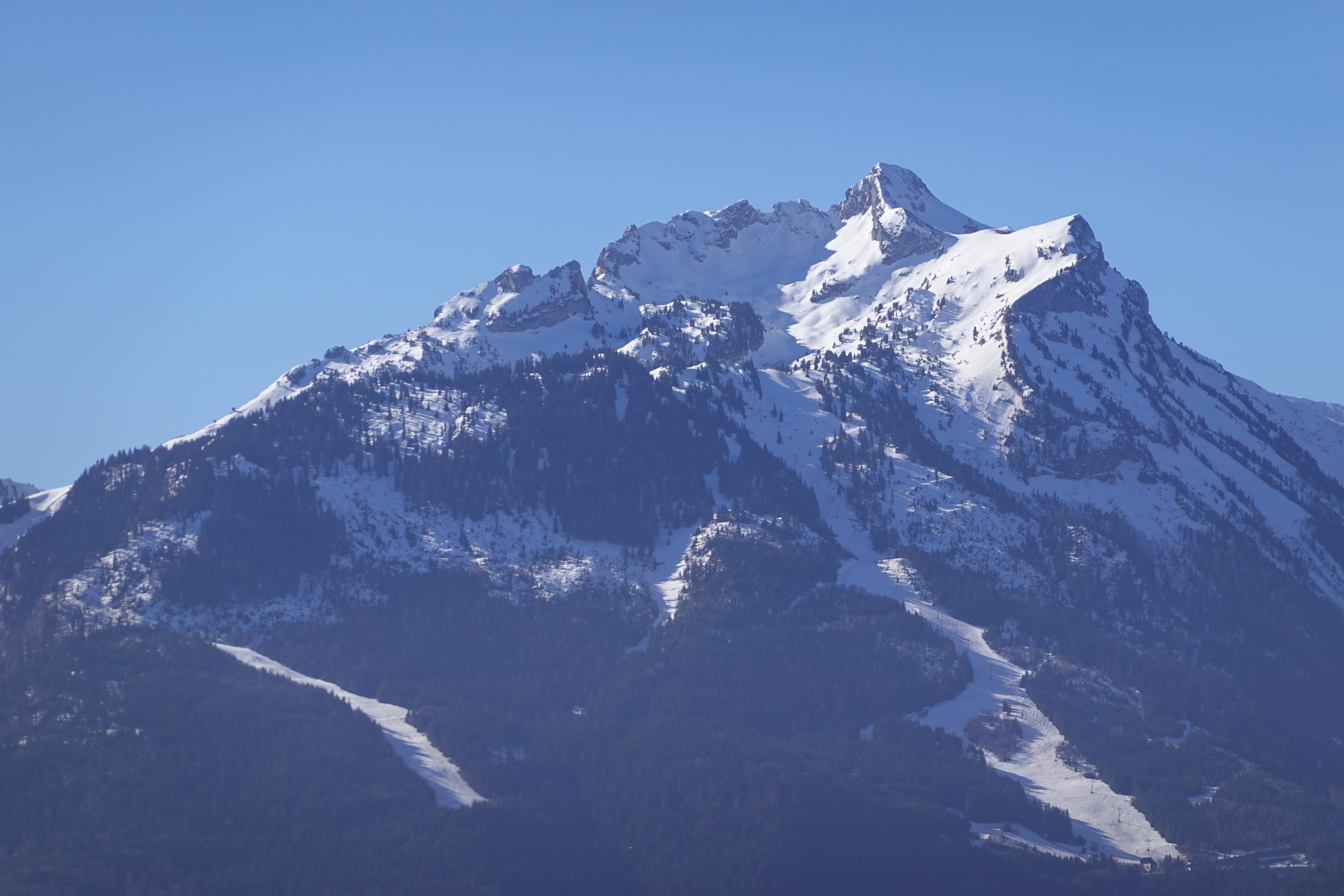
Pointe de la Sambuy @ Summit of Roc de Nantbellet @ Saint-Ferréol

La Sambuy-Seythenex is a former winter sports resort located in the commune of Faverges-Seythenex, in the Haute-Savoie department and the Auvergne-Rhône-Alpes region of France. Located in the Pays de Faverges and on the side of the Pointe de la Sambuy in the Bauges Mountains, the resort, created in 1960, offered a panorama of Lake Annecy and the surrounding mountains. The Alpine ski resort closed in 2023.

== Geography ==
Located in the heart of the Bauges Massif Regional Nature Park, the resort of La Sambuy-Seythenex is located between 1,000 and 2,000 m (3,300 and 6,600 ft) above sea level. The top of the resort's chairlift gives an extensive panorama of Mont Blanc, the Aravis Range and Lake Annecy.

Access to the resort is from the centre of Faverges, between Annecy and Albertville. The road is that of the Col de Tamié and then through the centre of Seythenex, before travelling the last 2 km (1.2 mi) to the resort.

== Toponymy ==
The resort of La Sambuy takes its name from the mountain on which the ski area extends.

== History ==
In 1955, a refuge was set up at the foot of the Pointe de la Sambuy. In 1960, La Sambuy introduced a surface lift and a ski slope. Two years later, a second ski lift and a chairlift were installed. During the late 20th century, the resort usually had snowfall from early December until late March. During the winter of 2022–23, the resort was only able to stay open for four weeks across January and February, but had an annual running cost of €80,000 and was losing around €500,000 annually. On 14 June 2023 the commune's council voted to close the winter sports resort for good. The reasons given being financial difficulties, the high cost of investments in the event of equipment renewal, as well as climate change. Although the winter sport infrastructure was due to be dismantled, the area's mayor stated that La Sambuy was still open for other sport and leisure activities.

== Operation ==
=== Facilities ===
La Sambuy is a ski resort without a village. This makes it a snow area only. There is only one ski area and no accommodation. It is therefore necessary to find accommodation in the commune located in the valley or in the communes of the Pays de Faverges. At the foot of the slopes, there is a building in which two restaurants, a sports equipment rental shop and a ski school are located. Local tourism, particularly in the commune of Faverges, was the subject of a resort-valley contract for the Pays de Faverges in the 1980s.

=== Ski area and management ===
The area offers a dozen slopes, including a green one reserved for beginners, a chairlift and three surface lifts. From 2001, the resort was managed by the single-purpose intercommunal syndicate "La Sambuy-Pays de Faverges", which replaced the former multipurpose intercommunal association of Faverges. It was financed by the communes of Seythenex and Faverges, which have now been merged. From 2016, the resort was managed by the town hall of Faverges-Seythenex.

== Activities ==
=== Winter ===
Downhill skiers have ten pistes available, including one green, two blue, three red and four black routes. The cross-country skiing area of Val de Tamié and Les Combes is located downhill from the resort of La Sambuy. The area consists of more than 30 km (19 mi) of slopes. Snowshoeing is also possible.

=== Summer ===
The area is used for mountain hiking. Guided hikes are organized several times a week, for those with a particular interest in the local environment and botany. A summer toboggan, trampolines and an orientation table are also part of the summer attractions at La Sambuy.
