= Montmin =

Commune in Haute-Savoie, France

Montmin Monmin (Savoyard)
- Part of Talloires-Montmin
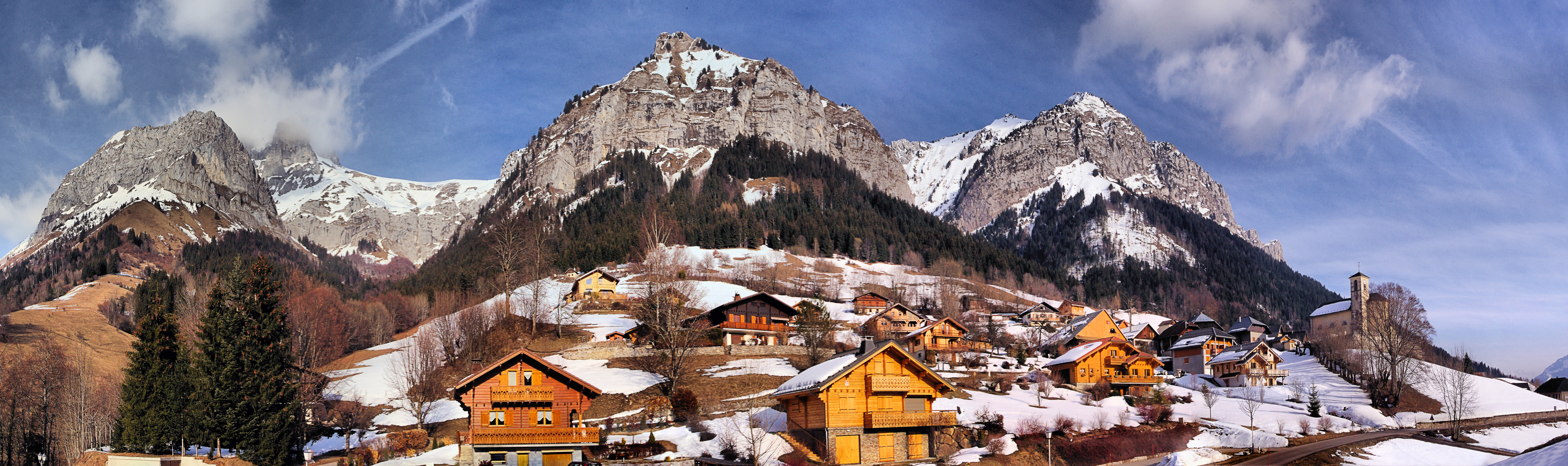
- A panorama of Montmin
- Location of Montmin
- Location within France Location within Auvergne-Rhône-Alpes
- Coordinates: 45°48′12″N 6°15′54″E
- Country: France
- Region: Auvergne-Rhône-Alpes
- Department: Haute-Savoie
- Arrondissement: Annecy
- Canton: Faverges
- Commune: Talloires-Montmin
- Area^{1}: 16.29 km^{2} (6.29 sq mi)
- Highest elevation: 2,338 m (7,671 ft)
- Lowest elevation: 635 m (2,083 ft)
- Population (2022): 320
  - Density: 20/km^{2} (51/sq mi)
- Time zone: UTC+01:00 (CET)
  - Summer (DST): UTC+02:00 (CEST)
- Postal code: 74210
- ^{1} French Land Register data, which excludes lakes, ponds, glaciers > 1 km^{2} (0.386 sq mi or 247 acres) and river estuaries.

Montmin (French pronunciation: [mɔ̃mɛ̃]; Savoyard: Monmin) is a former commune in the Haute-Savoie department in the Auvergne-Rhône-Alpes region in south-eastern France. On 1 January 2016, it was merged into the new commune of Talloires-Montmin.

Inhabitants of the commune are known as Montminois (male) and Montminoises (female).

== Geography ==
The seven hamlets occupy a four-mile long valley which is bordered on the west by Mont Chenevier, and on the east by the impressive and snow-capped Tournette massif. According to locals, Noah's Ark landed at the Col de l'Aulp, whose valley is indeed shaped like a ship; Noah, Biblical father of viticulture, would have planted the lakeside vineyards of Talloires, which produced wines and brandy until the 1950s. The mean elevation of the village is 1000 meters, or 3250 feet above sea level.

== History ==
First settled in the early Middle Ages, shortly after the year 1000, the hamlets were farming communities that existed almost entirely independently of the outside world until the advent of modern transportation.

== Tourism ==
With the arrival of modern roads and vehicles, Montmin has become a tourist attraction renowned for the scenic Col de la Forclaz mountain pass, one of the premier hang gliding and paragliding sites in Europe. Montmin hosted the 1995 Hang Gliding Championships of France. And in July 1997 Montmin watched the Tour de France bicycle race come through the community, up from Faverges, over the Col de la Forclaz and back down toward Bluffy and the high Alps to the east.

Unlike its neighbors in the high Alps (La Clusaz, Megève, etc.), Montmin has not become a vast urbanized winter playground crisscrossed with ski lifts and dotted with large hotels and apartment buildings. Cautious zoning and deliberately limited development have allowed Montmin to retain much of its charm as a quiet agricultural community, even though it is a mere twenty minutes from downtown Annecy.

In the winter, Montmin's small ski lifts are known as a good place for beginning and intermediate skiers; many of the villagers are certified ski instructors, and many children of the Annecy and Faverges area first learned to ski in Montmin. In the summer, the same lifts are used for summer gliding sports. Montmin's principal claim to fame is as the starting point of several popular hiking trails, including the scenic climb up Mt. Tournette, the tallest of the mountains overlooking Lake Annecy.

A hotel and several restaurants at the Col de la Forclaz mountain pass receive thousands of tourists who come to enjoy the excellent view of Lake Annecy. These facilities offer comfortable accommodations and traditional Savoy country cooking.

== Miscellaneous ==
The local cheese dairy farms produce the renowned Tomme and Reblochon cheeses for which the area is famous.

At the dawn of the 21st century, Montmin's population is beginning to grow again as the village finds a new role as a dormitory for the cities of Annecy and Faverges, though it retains much of its rustic charm.

== See also ==
- Communes of the Haute-Savoie department
