= Radox connector =

Obsolete electrical connector used to connect solar panels

RADOX Solar connectors are a largely obsolete electrical connector used to connect solar panels together in series to form strings.

== Overview ==
The RADOX Solar brand covered a variety of products from Huber+Suhner of Switzerland, but the connectors are the best known member of the line and the term Radox connector is synonymous.

The Radox connectors were most widely known from their use on Renewable Energy Corporation's solar panels from Norway, and did not find widespread use outside that market.

== Standards ==
Radox connectors did not meet new US standards that required the cables to not be able to disconnect without the use of a tool. Many companies introduced new connectors to meet these requirements, like the MC4 connector and Tyco Solarlok, but the Radox was not updated and quickly disappeared from the market.

== See also ==
- MC3 connector
