= MC3 =

MC3 may refer to:

- Montgomery County Community College
- MC3 connector
- Melanocortin 3 receptor
- Midnight Club 3: Dub Edition
