= Tyco Solarlok =

Electrical connector used to connect solar panels together

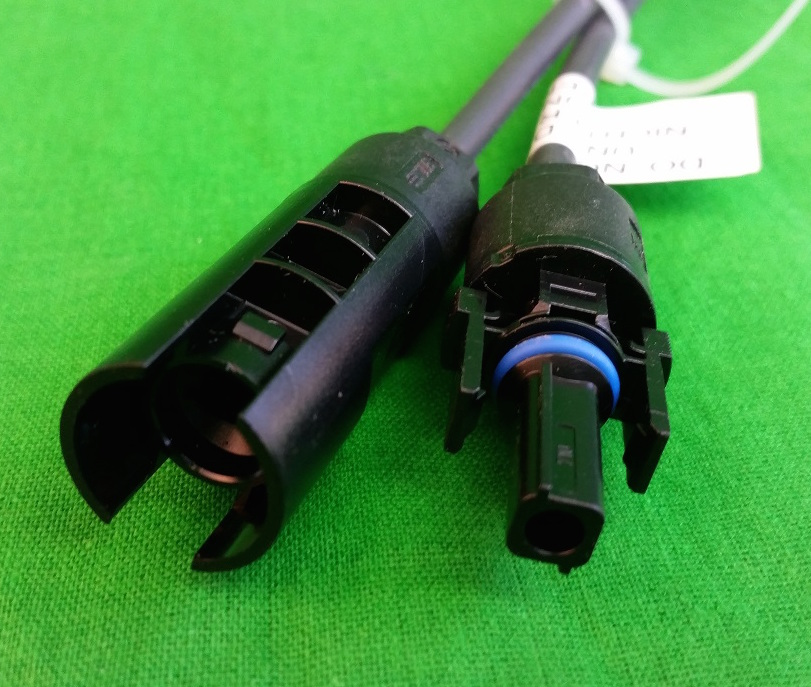
A front-on view of a typical pair of Tyco Solarlok solar panel connectors. The blue ring on the female connector indicates that it is keyed for negative polarity. The keys are the plastic ridges running along the probe on the right connector. The right connector is the female electrically, although it appears male mechanically.

Solarlok is a largely obsolete electrical connector used to connect solar panels together. Solarlok was introduced by Tyco International in order to meet new National Electrical Code (NEC) standards that required panel connectors to lock together and only be separated again using a tool. Solarlok became very common in the United States where the code first came into effect, but had varying degrees of market success outside the US. Due to the connector only being available from Tyco, the connectors are almost always referred to simply as Tyco connectors.

== Background information ==
Solar panels are generally connected together in series, or strings, which allows cabling to be daisy-chained between the panels. In the early days of solar power the panel connectors were generally screw terminals located under a removable panel, but due to electrical code restrictions this could not be assembled except by a licensed electrician. Non-licensed technicians do have exceptions when dealing with a "convenience receptacle", a plug that was designed specifically for end-users, like those found on common household electrical equipment like desk lamps. To allow roofers and other laborers without a electrician's license to install panels, a number of connectors entered the market in the 1990s, with the better known examples being the MC3 connector and Radox connector. Both designs were essentially weatherproofed versions of small phono jacks, with the connector and sockets surrounded by rubberized material to protect them from water. These had the downside that they could be disconnected by pulling on them, which could occur naturally with snow buildup and similar effects. The code in the NEC required such connectors to lock, leading to a market for new designs.

== Design ==
Most panel connectors are designed to be mounted with one end of the cable permanently and internally connected to the panel, with the other end of the cable equipped with the connector. This allows the panels to be connected together by snapping together adjacent connectors. Solarlok did not work this way, instead it imagined the panels and all other equipment in the system (inverters, combiners, etc.) would be equipped with sockets, while the cables had plug connectors at both ends. This meant that the panels themselves did not have to have cables permanently connected to them, which helped when you want to span a longer distance or solve other problems where a permanent cable might not be long enough. However, this led to the possibility that one could connect the positive output from one panel to the positive of the next (or negative to negative) by confusing the wires. To eliminate this possibility, the sockets and plugs had plastic flanges known as "keys" that indicated their polarity, and prevented a cable from being plugged into a positive at one end and negative at the other.

== Utility ==
In practice, no one used the original design concept, and the Solarlok connectors were simply one of a number of connectors offered by most manufacturers. In these cases a Solarlok connector was placed at the end of the panel's permanent wiring, and in order to allow the panels to be plugged together, they were arranged as plug on one wire and socket on the other. Unfortunately there was no standard for which of these should be positive and which negative, and manufacturers selected them seemingly at random. It was not at all uncommon to find that extension cables would not plug into panels in the field because they had the wrong keys, requiring the cables to be rebuilt with the opposing polarity connectors. Other standards of the era, like MC3, always defined the male to be positive and the female to be negative, eliminating this issue.

== Replacement ==
As the new NEC codes were adopted around the world, competitors to the Solarlok quickly appeared. The MC4 connector soon took a leadership position among these, and is today almost universal in the solar market. Solarlok is rarely found today, mostly on older equipment.
