= ITV Parapentes =

French aircraft manufacturer

- Company type: Privately held company
- Industry: Aerospace
- Founded: 1980s
- Headquarters: Doussard, France
- Key people: Xavier Demoury, designer
- Products: Paragliders, paramotor wings
- Website: www.itv-parapentes.com

ITV Parapentes (ITV Paragliders) is a French aircraft manufacturer based in Doussard and formerly in Épagny, Haute-Savoie. The company specializes in the design and manufacture of paragliders in the form of ready-to-fly aircraft. The company also constructs paramotor wings.

The company was founded in the 1980s and grew to be one of the largest paraglider manufacturers in the world.

In the early 2000s the company had a range of beginner gliders including the Opale and the Proxima, plus several intermediate gliders, such as the Diamant, Polaris and the Tomahawk. They also built a two-place glider for flight training, the Turquoise. All gliders were designed by Xavier Demoury.

== Aircraft ==
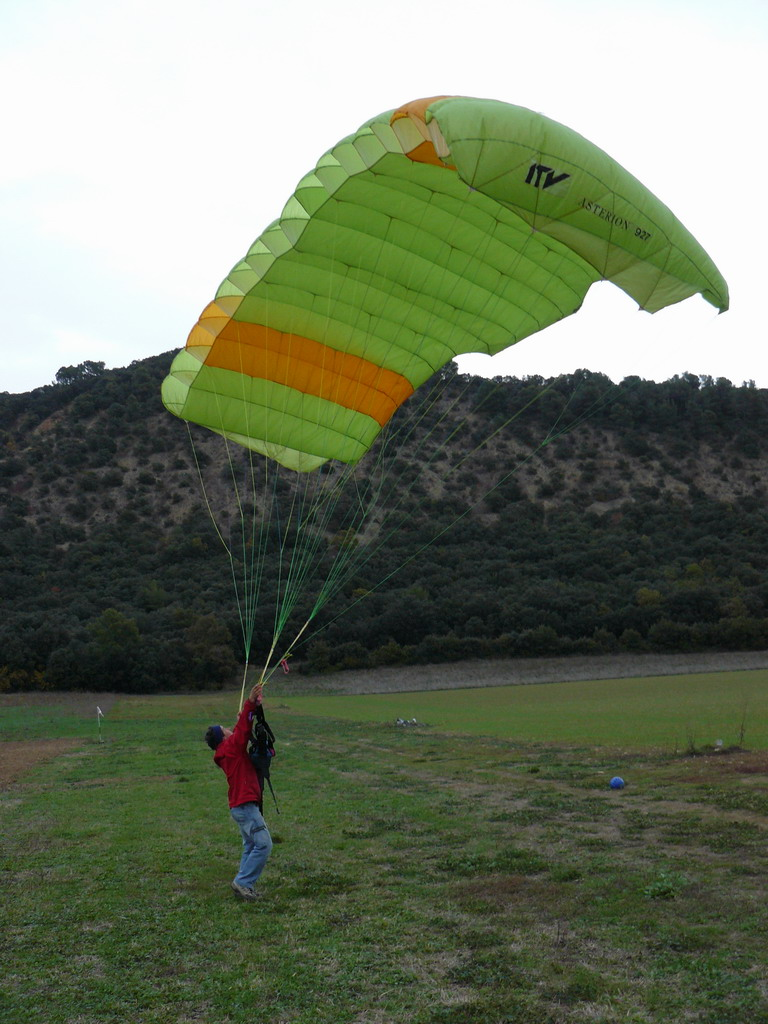
ITV Asterion from 1986

Summary of aircraft built by ITV:

- ITV Asterion
- ITV Awak
- ITV Billy
- ITV Bip Bip
- ITV Boxer
- ITV Bulldog
- ITV Dakota
- ITV Diamant
- ITV Dolpo
- ITV Fury
- ITV Jedi
- ITV Meteor
- ITV Opale
- ITV Papoose
- ITV Pawnee
- ITV Polaris
- ITV Proxima
- ITV Shakra
- ITV Siam
- ITV Stewart Tandem
- ITV Tepee
- ITV Thanka
- ITV Tomahawk
- ITV Tsampa
- ITV Turquoise
- ITV Vega
