= Le Bouchet-Mont-Charvin =

- Commune
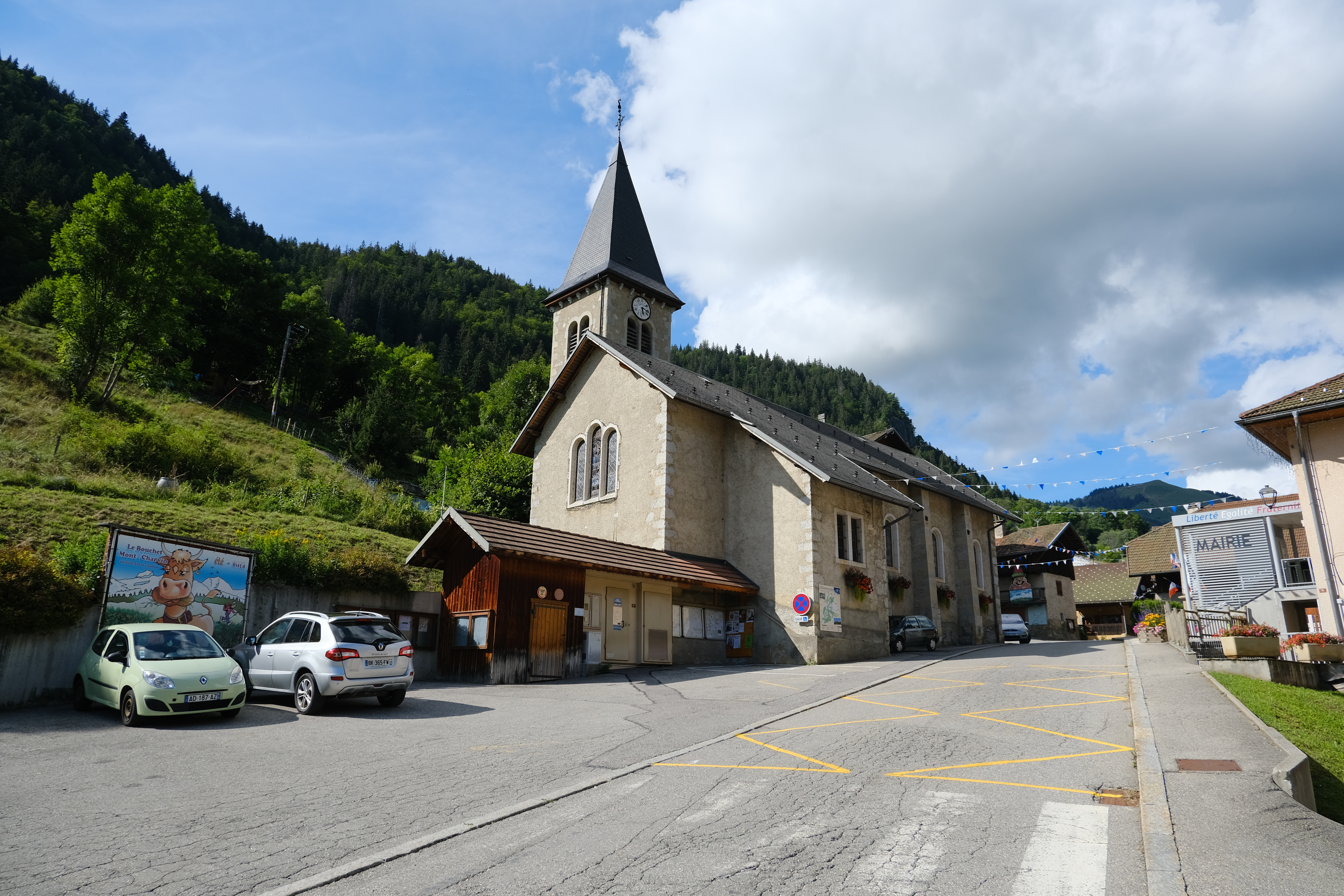
- Assomption-de-Marie church
- Location of Le Bouchet-Mont-Charvin
- Location within France Location within Auvergne-Rhône-Alpes
- Coordinates: 45°47′54″N 6°21′52″E
- Country: France
- Region: Auvergne-Rhône-Alpes
- Department: Haute-Savoie
- Arrondissement: Annecy
- Canton: Faverges
- Intercommunality: CC des Vallées de Thônes

Government
  - Mayor (2020–2026): Franck Paccard
- Area^{1}: 18.52 km^{2} (7.15 sq mi)
- Highest elevation: 2,407 m (7,897 ft)
- Lowest elevation: 745 m (2,444 ft)
- Population (2023): 245
  - Density: 13.2/km^{2} (34.3/sq mi)
- Time zone: UTC+01:00 (CET)
  - Summer (DST): UTC+02:00 (CEST)
- INSEE/Postal code: 74045 /74230
- ^{1} French Land Register data, which excludes lakes, ponds, glaciers > 1 km^{2} (0.386 sq mi or 247 acres) and river estuaries.

Le Bouchet-Mont-Charvin (French pronunciation: [lə buʃɛ mɔ̃ ʃaʁvɛ̃]; before 2013: Le Bouchet) is a commune in the eastern French department of Haute-Savoie.

== See also ==
- Communes of the Haute-Savoie department
