= MC4 connector =

Electrical connector for solar panels

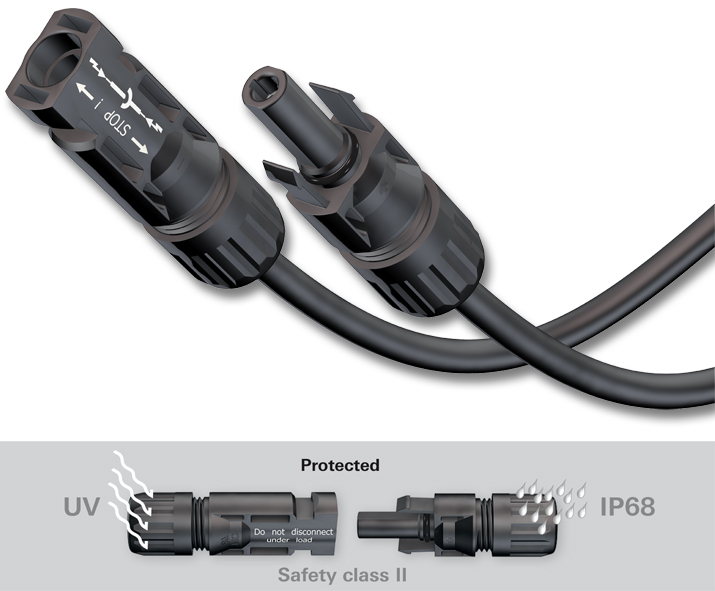
PV connectors MC4: weatherproof DC connectors.

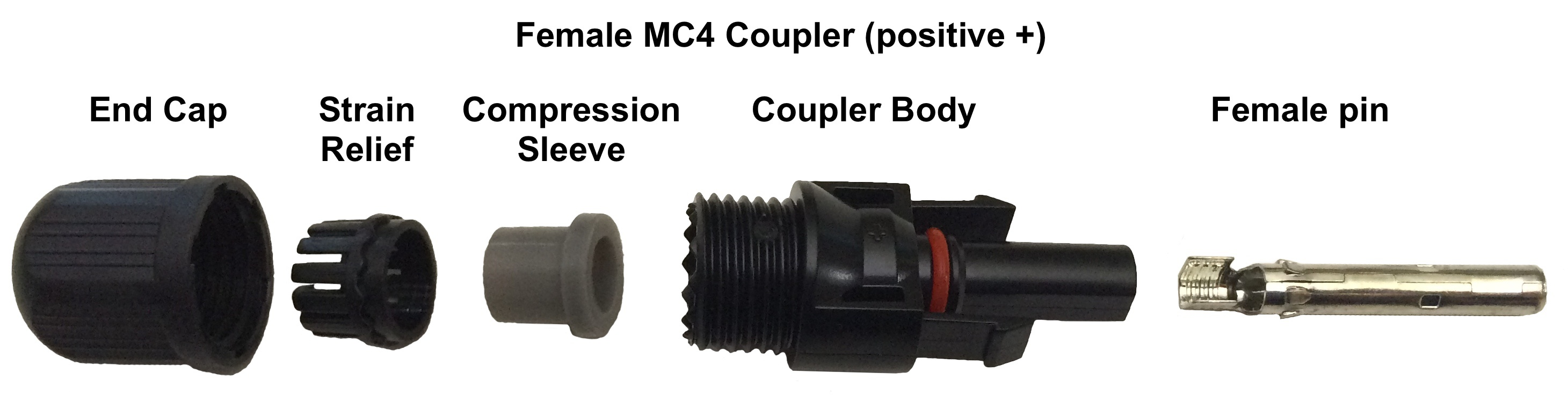
Exploded view of a female MC4 connector.

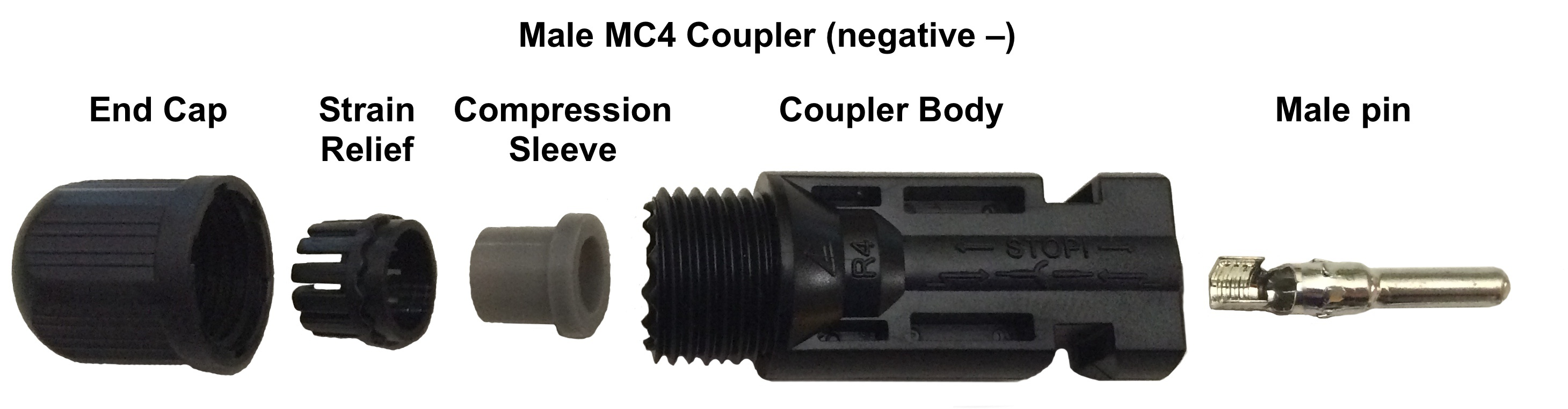
Exploded view of a male MC4 connector.

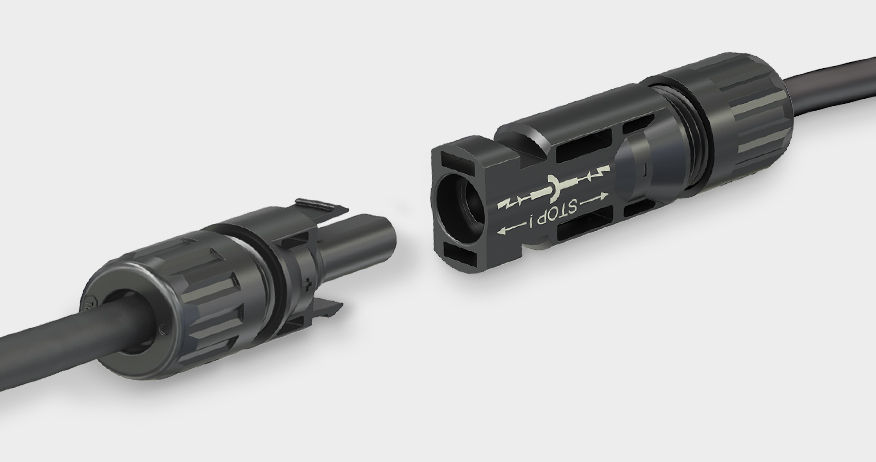
Descriptive view of MC4 Connector

MC4 connectors are electrical connectors commonly used for connecting solar panels. The MC in MC4 stands for the manufacturer Multi-Contact (now Stäubli Electrical Connectors), and the 4 for the 4 mm diameter contact pin. MC4s allow strings of panels to be easily constructed by pushing the compatible connectors from adjacent panels together by hand, but require a tool to disconnect them to ensure they do not accidentally disconnect when the cables are pulled. The National Electrical Code (NEC) and the UL6703 standard for PV connectors specify that connectors have to be from the same type and brand to avoid the dangers of cross-mating. In addition, IEC 62548 ‘design requirements for PV Systems' require PV connectors to be of the same origin. Originally rated for 600 V, newer versions of the MC4 connector are rated at 1500 V, which allows longer series strings to be created.

== Background ==
MC4 connectors were introduced by Multi-Contact in 2004 as successors to Multi-Contact's MC3 connector (with a 3 mm diameter contact pin) developed in 1996. MC3 had certification ratings of (1000VIEC/600V UL) and 30A (using 10AWG PV Cable). MC3 connectors were discontinued in 2016.

While small solar panels used for battery charging and similar tasks may not require special connectors, larger systems normally connect the panels together in series to form strings. In the past, this was accomplished by opening a small electrical box on the back of the panel and connecting user-supplied wires to screw terminals within. However, in the United States, bare terminals of this sort are limited to 50 V or less by the National Electrical Code (NEC). Additionally, these sorts of connections were subject to problems caused by water leakage, electrical corrosion and mechanical stress on the wires.

Starting in the 2000s, a number of companies introduced products to address these issues. In these systems, the junction box was sealed and two wires were permanently attached using strain reliefs. The cables ended with PV connectors that met the definition of a convenience receptacle, meaning they could be (legally) connected together by anyone. Two connectors became somewhat common during this period, the Radox connector and MC3 connector, both of which essentially looked like weather-sealed phono jacks.

In 2008, the NEC banned connectors that allowed disconnection under load, which was seen in the field when snow or debris piled up on the cables. PV connectors were now required to contain positive locking mechanisms controlled by certified, product specific tools. Radox, a European manufacturer, did not respond to this specification and has since disappeared from the market. Tyco Electronics and Multi-Contact (purchased by Stäubli in 2002), responded by introducing new connectors to meet this requirement. The MC4 PV connector, launched in 2004, provided these positive locking mechanisms, leading to widespread market acceptance.

Tyco's Solarlok became a market leader for a period in the late 2000s, but a number of factors conspired to push it from the market. Among these was that the system had two sets of cables and wires, which led to considerable annoyance in the field when equipment from different vendors could not be plugged together. By 2011, the MC4 was already in a strong leadership position, which led to the introduction of products from a variety of other connector vendors. As of 2022, Staubli Electrical Connectors possesses 50% of its global market shares.

The Stäubli MC4 EVO2 is a backward-compatible version of the Stäubli MC4 connector with higher ratings.

== Description ==
The MC4 system consists of a plug and socket design. The metal contacts of the plugs and sockets are inside plastic insulators; the plug's metal contact is inside a cylindrical insulator that looks like a socket, and the socket metal contact is inside a square probe that appears as a plug. The socket has two plastic locking tabs that have to be pressed toward the central probe slightly to insert into holes in the front of the plug connector. When the two are pushed together, the fingers slide down the holes until they reach a notch in the side of the plug connector, where they pop outward to lock the two together.

For a proper seal, MC4s must be used with cable of the correct diameter. The cable is normally double-insulated (insulation plus black sheath) and both UV and higher temperature resistant (most cables deteriorate if used outdoors without protection from sunlight). Connectors are typically attached by crimping.

The Stäubli MC4 connector is UL rated at 1500 V DC and up to 95 A with the 6AWG PV Cable. MC4-Evo 2 has both UL and IEC certification ratings of 1500 V DC and up to 70 A with 10 mm² PV Cable, depending on the conductor size used in pairs.

== Application and safety ==
It is very important never to connect or disconnect connectors under load, even on low-voltage (12–48 V) systems. An electric arc may form which can melt and seriously damage contact materials, resulting in high resistance and subsequent overheating. This is partly because direct current (DC) continues to arc, whereas commonly used alternating current (AC) more readily self-extinguishes at the zero-crossing voltage point.

Large arrays of panels are commonly interconnected in series, made of strings of panels generating 17 V to 50 V each, with overall voltages up to 600 V per string or 1500 V in larger arrays.

The installation manuals from Stäubli on MC4 connectors instruct to avoid using non-Stäubli connectors. Product certifications and manufacturer warranties generally require MC4 connectors to be mated to connectors of the same manufacturer and type.

== Other Products ==
Besides Stäubli's MC4 line, other MC4-type manufacturers or products include:

- AGX MC4
- Amphenol H4
- CHINT Group Co., Ltd. PV-HCB40X
- GEYA MC4
- Leader Group Co.
- Molex SolarSpec
- Phoenix Contact SUNCLIX
- TE Connectivity SOLARLOK PV4-S
- VIOX
- Zhejiang Jinghong Electric Co., Ltd.

== See also ==
- Daisy chain (electrical engineering)
- DC connector
