= Les Villards-sur-Thônes =

- Commune
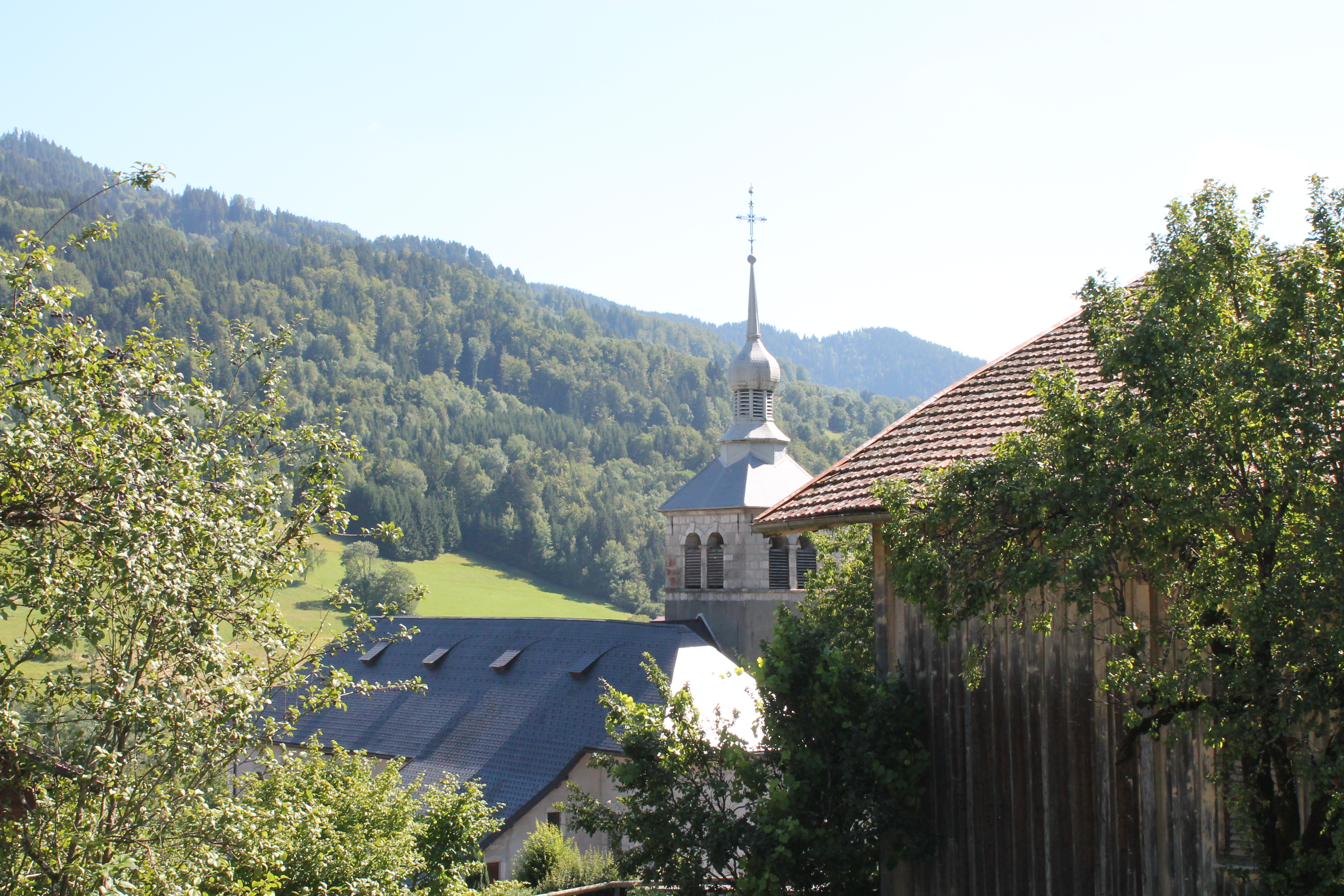
- The church of Saint-Laurent, in Les Villards-sur-Thônes-Profil
- Location of Les Villards-sur-Thônes
- Location within France Location within Auvergne-Rhône-Alpes
- Coordinates: 45°54′29″N 6°21′59″E
- Country: France
- Region: Auvergne-Rhône-Alpes
- Department: Haute-Savoie
- Arrondissement: Annecy
- Canton: Faverges
- Intercommunality: Vallées de Thônes

Government
  - Mayor (2020–2026): Gérard Fournier-Bidoz
- Area^{1}: 13.32 km^{2} (5.14 sq mi)
- Elevation: 758 m (2,487 ft)
- Highest elevation: 2,019 m (6,624 ft)
- Lowest elevation: 716 m (2,349 ft)
- Population (2023): 1,132
  - Density: 84.98/km^{2} (220.1/sq mi)
- Time zone: UTC+01:00 (CET)
  - Summer (DST): UTC+02:00 (CEST)
- INSEE/Postal code: 74302 /74230
- ^{1} French Land Register data, which excludes lakes, ponds, glaciers > 1 km^{2} (0.386 sq mi or 247 acres) and river estuaries.

Les Villards-sur-Thônes (French pronunciation: [le vilaʁ syʁ ton], literally Les Villards on Thônes; Arpitan: Lou Vlâr) is a commune in the Haute-Savoie department in the Auvergne-Rhône-Alpes region in south-eastern France.

== See also ==
- Communes of the Haute-Savoie department
