= Alex, Haute-Savoie =

Alex Alé (Savoyard)
- Commune
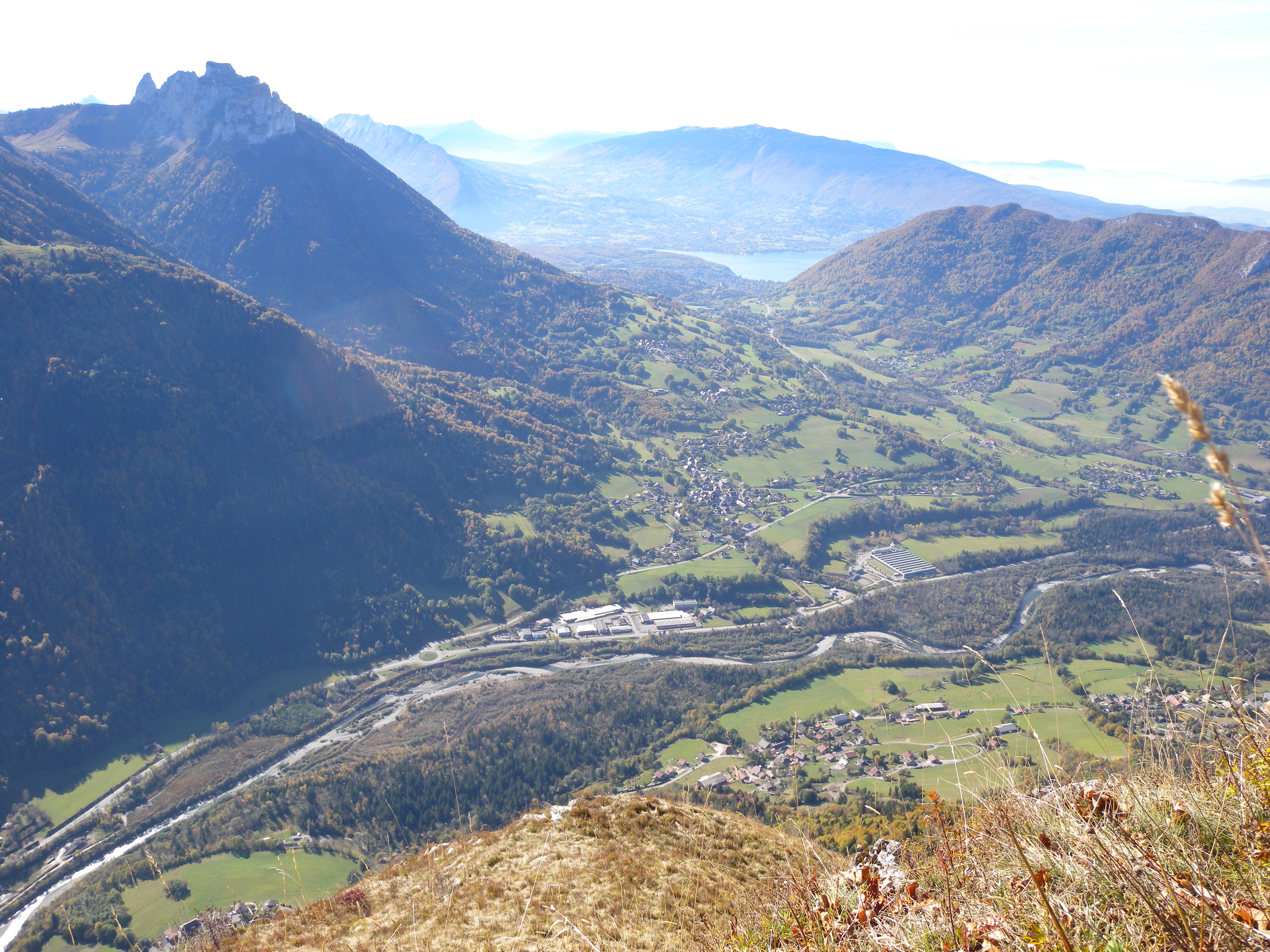
- A view of the village from the Parmelan, with Lake Annecy in the background
- Location of Alex
- Location within France Location within Auvergne-Rhône-Alpes
- Coordinates: 45°53′23″N 6°14′21″E
- Country: France
- Region: Auvergne-Rhône-Alpes
- Department: Haute-Savoie
- Arrondissement: Annecy
- Canton: Faverges
- Intercommunality: Vallées de Thônes

Government
  - Mayor (2020–2026): Catherine Haueter
- Area^{1}: 17.02 km^{2} (6.57 sq mi)
- Highest elevation: 1,852 m (6,076 ft)
- Lowest elevation: 516 m (1,693 ft)
- Population (2023): 1,139
  - Density: 66.92/km^{2} (173.3/sq mi)
- Time zone: UTC+01:00 (CET)
  - Summer (DST): UTC+02:00 (CEST)
- INSEE/Postal code: 74003 /74290
- ^{1} French Land Register data, which excludes lakes, ponds, glaciers > 1 km^{2} (0.386 sq mi or 247 acres) and river estuaries.

Alex (French pronunciation: [alɛks]; Savoyard: Alé) is a commune in the Haute-Savoie department in the Auvergne-Rhône-Alpes region in south-eastern France.

== Geography ==
The Fier forms most of the commune's northern border.

== Population ==
Historical population
Year	Pop.	±% p.a.
1968	246	—
1975	268	+1.23%
1982	429	+6.95%
1990	574	+3.71%
1999	792	+3.64%
2007	950	+2.30%
2012	1,002	+1.07%
2017	1,072	+1.36%
2023	1,139	+1.02%
Source: INSEE

== See also ==
- Communes of the Haute-Savoie department
- Allex, Drôme
