= Serraval =

- Commune
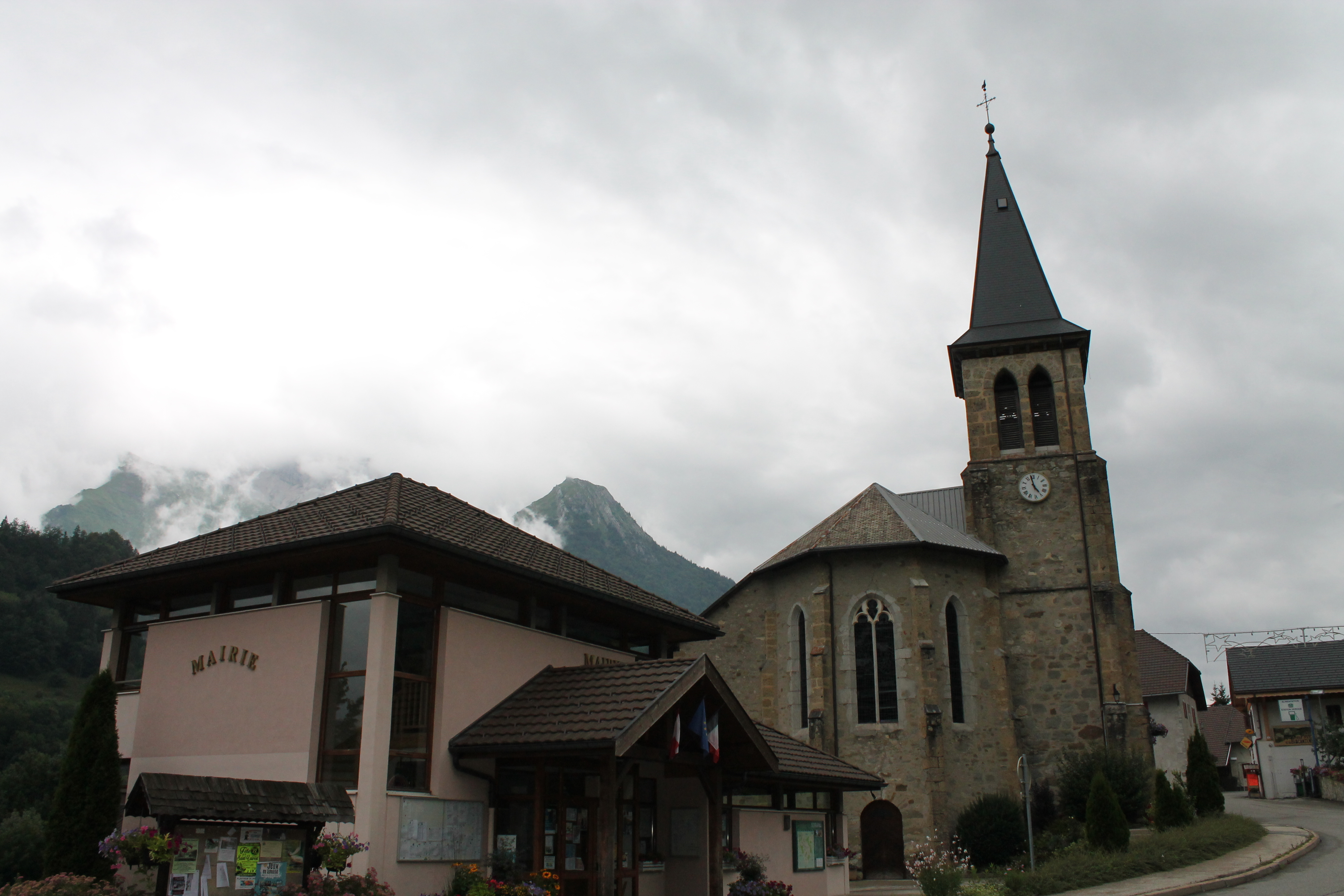
- The church of Saint-Maurice, in Serraval

- Coat of arms
- Location of Serraval
- Location within France Location within Auvergne-Rhône-Alpes
- Coordinates: 45°48′14″N 6°20′25″E
- Country: France
- Region: Auvergne-Rhône-Alpes
- Department: Haute-Savoie
- Arrondissement: Annecy
- Canton: Faverges
- Intercommunality: CC des Vallées de Thônes

Government
  - Mayor (2020–2026): Philippe Roisine
- Area^{1}: 19.73 km^{2} (7.62 sq mi)
- Highest elevation: 2,200 m (7,200 ft)
- Lowest elevation: 626 m (2,054 ft)
- Population (2023): 758
  - Density: 38.4/km^{2} (99.5/sq mi)
- Time zone: UTC+01:00 (CET)
  - Summer (DST): UTC+02:00 (CEST)
- INSEE/Postal code: 74265 /74230
- ^{1} French Land Register data, which excludes lakes, ponds, glaciers > 1 km^{2} (0.386 sq mi or 247 acres) and river estuaries.

Serraval (French pronunciation: [seʁaval]; Arpitan: Sérava) is a commune in the Haute-Savoie department in the Auvergne-Rhône-Alpes region in south-eastern France. As of 2021, the estimated population of this region is 732.

== See also ==
- Communes of the Haute-Savoie department
