= Seythenex =

Commune in Haute-Savoie, France

Seythenex Sètné (Savoyard)
- Part of Faverges-Seythenex
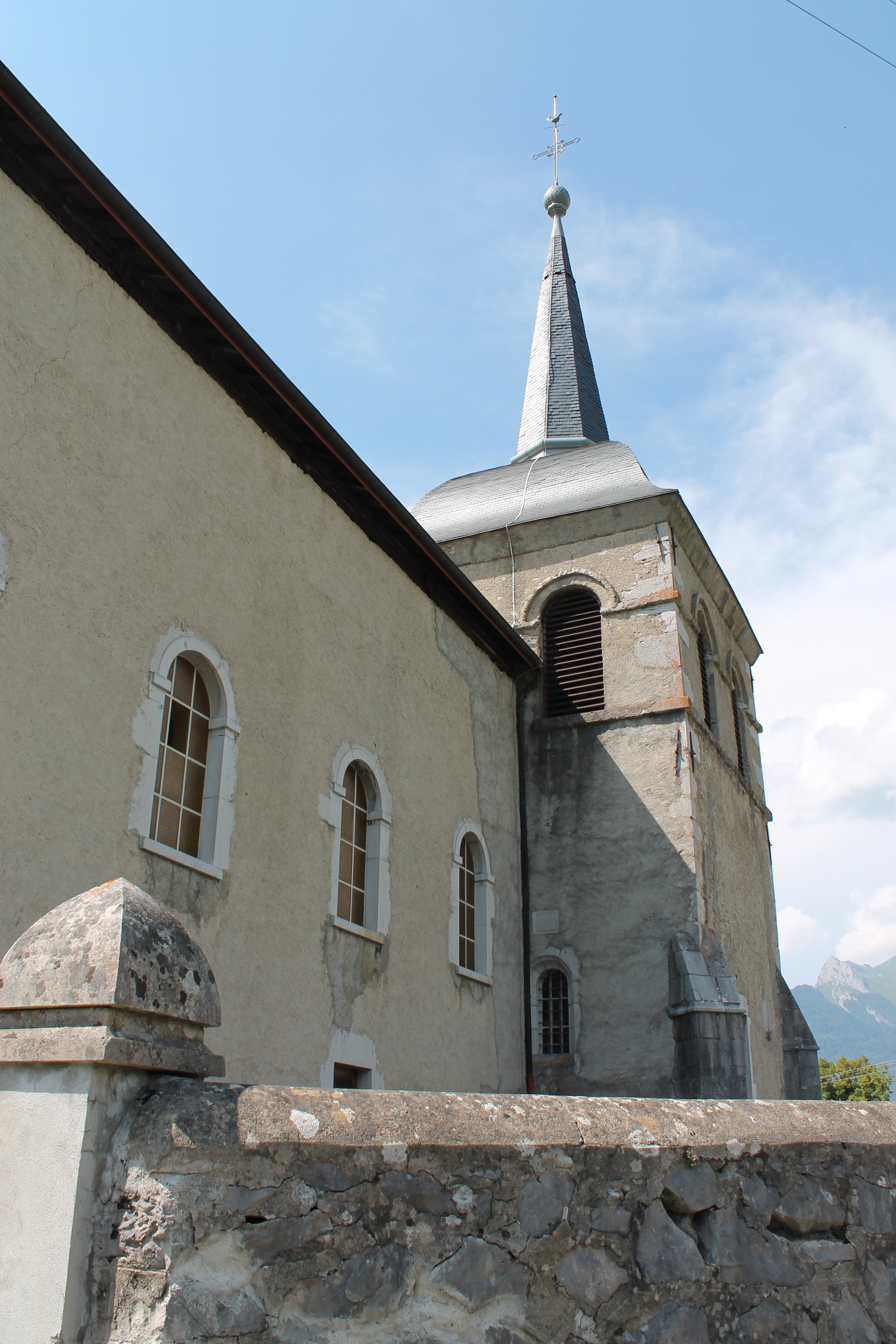
- The church of Saint-Sigismond, in Seythenex
- Location of Seythenex
- Location within France Location within Auvergne-Rhône-Alpes
- Coordinates: 45°43′36″N 6°18′01″E
- Country: France
- Region: Auvergne-Rhône-Alpes
- Department: Haute-Savoie
- Arrondissement: Annecy
- Canton: Faverges
- Commune: Faverges-Seythenex
- Area^{1}: 33.41 km^{2} (12.90 sq mi)
- Highest elevation: 2,210 m (7,250 ft)
- Lowest elevation: 558 m (1,831 ft)
- Population (2018): 665
  - Density: 19.9/km^{2} (51.6/sq mi)
- Demonym: Seytheneyard / Seytheneyarde
- Time zone: UTC+01:00 (CET)
  - Summer (DST): UTC+02:00 (CEST)
- Postal code: 74210
- ^{1} French Land Register data, which excludes lakes, ponds, glaciers > 1 km^{2} (0.386 sq mi or 247 acres) and river estuaries.

Seythenex (French pronunciation: [sɛtne]; Savoyard: Sètné) is a former commune in the Haute-Savoie department in the Auvergne-Rhône-Alpes region in south-eastern France. On 1 January 2016, it was merged into the new commune of Faverges-Seythenex. Its population was 665 in 2018.

== See also ==
- Communes of the Haute-Savoie department
