= Faverges-Seythenex =

- Commune
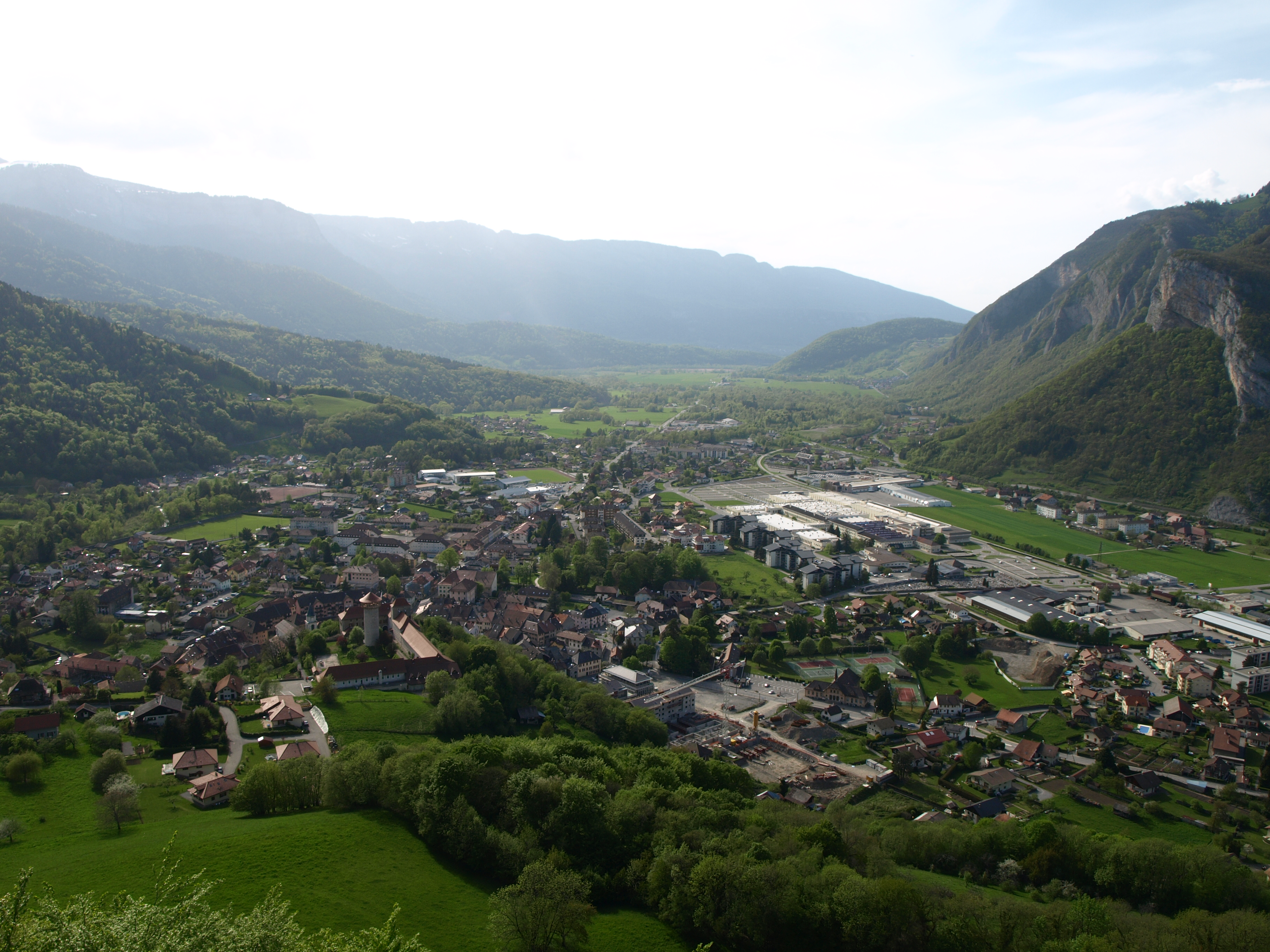
- A general view of Faverges
- Location of Faverges-Seythenex
- Location within France Location within Auvergne-Rhône-Alpes
- Coordinates: 45°45′N 6°18′E
- Country: France
- Region: Auvergne-Rhône-Alpes
- Department: Haute-Savoie
- Arrondissement: Annecy
- Canton: Faverges
- Intercommunality: C.C. des Sources du Lac d'Annecy

Government
  - Mayor (2020–2026): Jacques Dalex
- Area^{1}: 59.3 km^{2} (22.9 sq mi)
- Population (2023): 7,545
  - Density: 127/km^{2} (330/sq mi)
- Time zone: UTC+01:00 (CET)
  - Summer (DST): UTC+02:00 (CEST)
- INSEE/Postal code: 74123 /74210
- Website: faverges-seythenex.fr
- ^{1} French Land Register data, which excludes lakes, ponds, glaciers > 1 km^{2} (0.386 sq mi or 247 acres) and river estuaries.

Faverges-Seythenex (French pronunciation: [favɛʁʒ sɛtne]) is a commune in the Haute-Savoie department in the Auvergne-Rhône-Alpes region in south-eastern France. It was created on 1 January 2016 when the communes Faverges and Seythenex were merged.

The ski resort of La Sambuy-Seythenex is within the commune.

== Population ==
Population data refer to the area corresponding with the commune as of January 2025.

Historical population
Year	Pop.	±% p.a.
1968	4,988	—
1975	5,573	+1.60%
1982	6,569	+2.38%
1990	6,774	+0.38%
1999	6,788	+0.02%
2007	7,142	+0.64%
2012	7,586	+1.21%
2017	7,606	+0.05%
2023	7,545	−0.13%
Source: INSEE

== See also ==
- Communes of the Haute-Savoie department
