= Talloires-Montmin =

- Commune
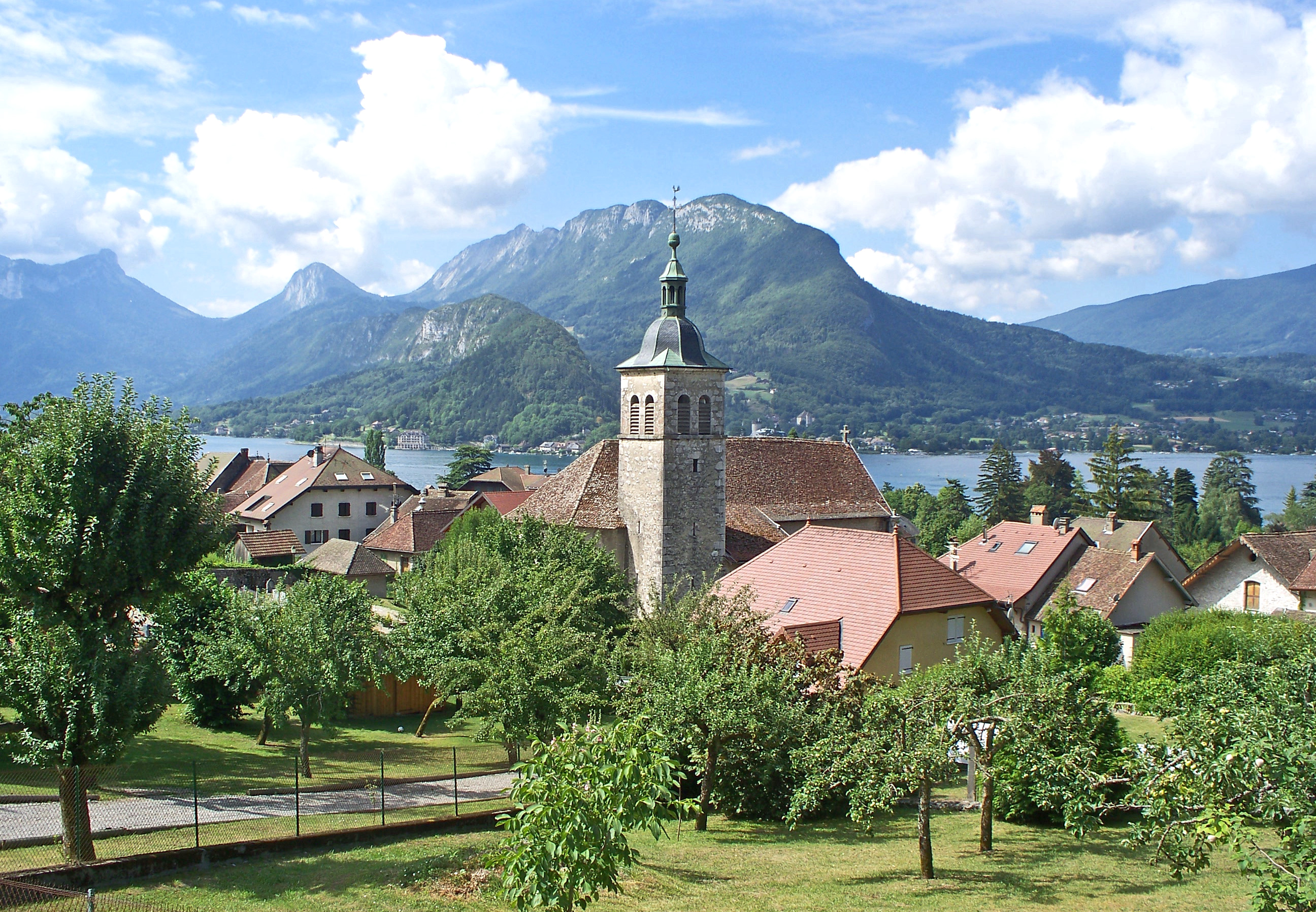
- Talloires, next to Lake Annecy
- Location of Talloires-Montmin
- Location within France Location within Auvergne-Rhône-Alpes
- Coordinates: 45°50′24″N 6°12′54″E
- Country: France
- Region: Auvergne-Rhône-Alpes
- Department: Haute-Savoie
- Arrondissement: Annecy
- Canton: Faverges
- Intercommunality: CA Grand Annecy

Government
  - Mayor (2020–2026): Didier Sarda
- Area^{1}: 36.98 km^{2} (14.28 sq mi)
- Population (2023): 1,903
  - Density: 51.46/km^{2} (133.3/sq mi)
- Time zone: UTC+01:00 (CET)
  - Summer (DST): UTC+02:00 (CEST)
- INSEE/Postal code: 74275 /74290, 74210
- ^{1} French Land Register data, which excludes lakes, ponds, glaciers > 1 km^{2} (0.386 sq mi or 247 acres) and river estuaries.

Talloires-Montmin (French pronunciation: [talwaʁ mɔ̃mɛ̃]) is a commune in the Haute-Savoie department in the Auvergne-Rhône-Alpes region in Eastern France. As of 2023, the population was 1,903. It was established on 1 January 2016 following the fusion of the former communes of Talloires and Montmin.

== See also ==
- Communes of the Haute-Savoie department
