= Giez, Haute-Savoie =

Giez
- Commune
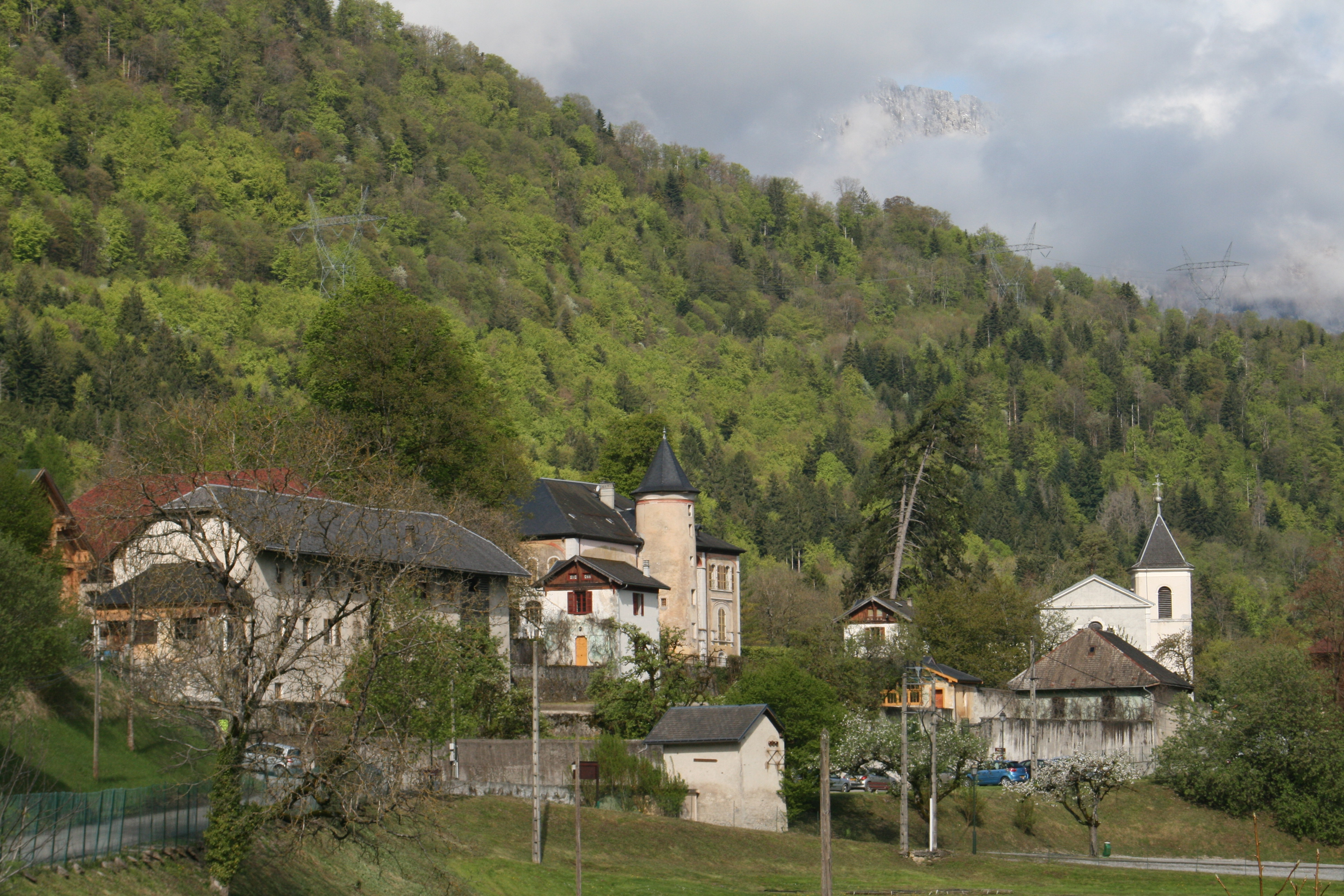
- A view of old Giez

- Coat of arms
- Location of Giez
- Location within France Location within Auvergne-Rhône-Alpes
- Coordinates: 45°45′10″N 6°14′51″E
- Country: France
- Region: Auvergne-Rhône-Alpes
- Department: Haute-Savoie
- Arrondissement: Annecy
- Canton: Faverges
- Intercommunality: C.C. des Sources du Lac d'Annecy

Government
  - Mayor (2020–2026): Marc Paget
- Area^{1}: 12.65 km^{2} (4.88 sq mi)
- Highest elevation: 1,782 m (5,846 ft)
- Lowest elevation: 472 m (1,549 ft)
- Population (2023): 570
  - Density: 45/km^{2} (120/sq mi)
- Demonym: Gicans / Gicanes
- Time zone: UTC+01:00 (CET)
  - Summer (DST): UTC+02:00 (CEST)
- INSEE/Postal code: 74135 /74210
- ^{1} French Land Register data, which excludes lakes, ponds, glaciers > 1 km^{2} (0.386 sq mi or 247 acres) and river estuaries.

Giez is a commune in the Haute-Savoie department in the Auvergne-Rhône-Alpes region in south-eastern France.

== See also ==
- Communes of the Haute-Savoie department
