= Faverges =

Commune in Haute-Savoie, France

Faverges Favèrges (Savoyard) Faverge (Italian)
- Part of Faverges-Seythenex
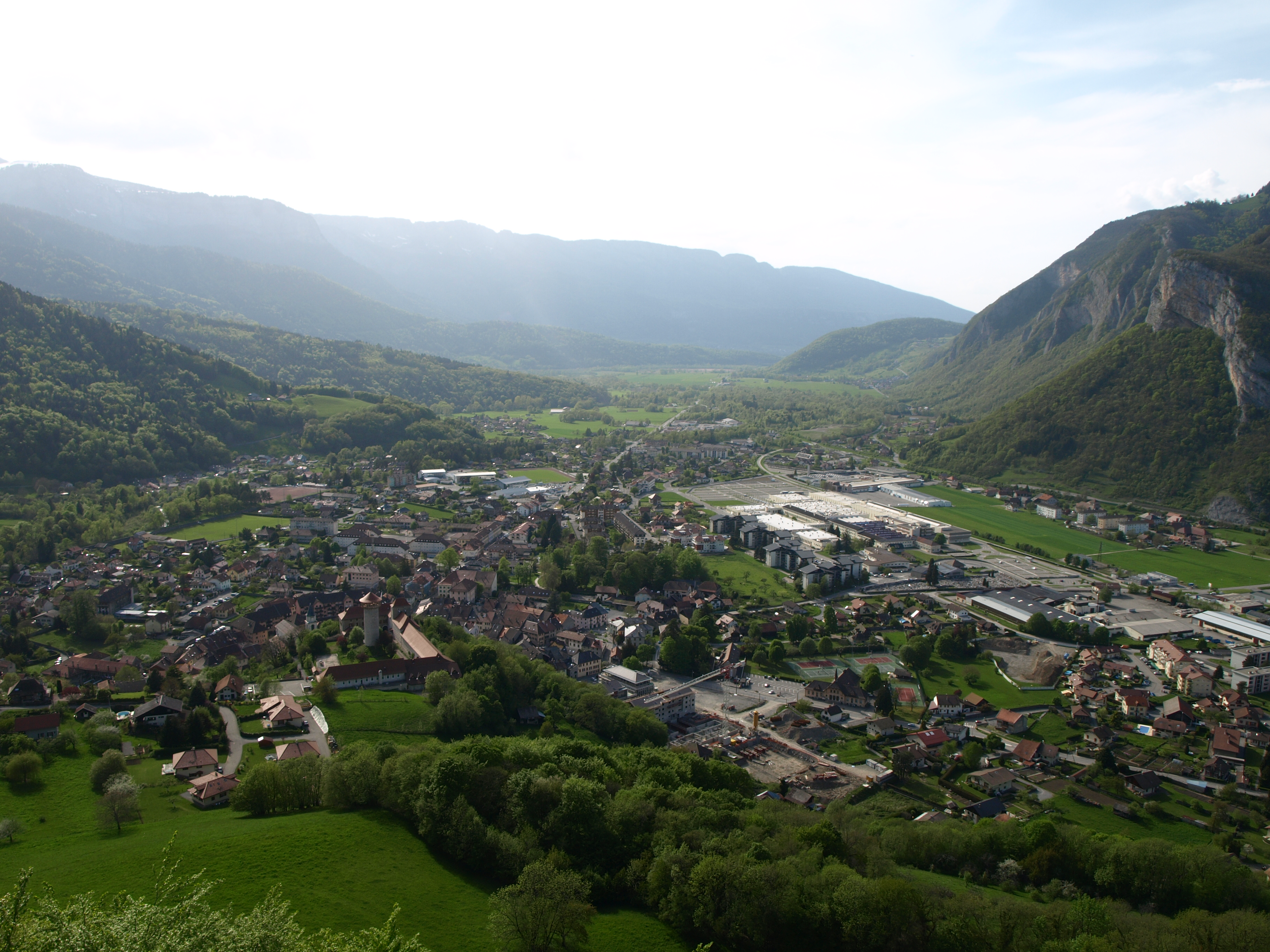
- A general view of Faverges

- Coat of arms
- Location of Faverges
- Location within France Location within Auvergne-Rhône-Alpes
- Coordinates: 45°44′50″N 6°17′40″E
- Country: France
- Region: Auvergne-Rhône-Alpes
- Department: Haute-Savoie
- Arrondissement: Annecy
- Canton: Faverges
- Commune: Faverges-Seythenex
- Area^{1}: 25.86 km^{2} (9.98 sq mi)
- Elevation: 510 m (1,670 ft)
- Highest elevation: 2,063 m (6,768 ft)
- Lowest elevation: 472 m (1,549 ft)
- Population (2018): 6,943
  - Density: 268.5/km^{2} (695.4/sq mi)
- Time zone: UTC+01:00 (CET)
  - Summer (DST): UTC+02:00 (CEST)
- Postal code: 74210
- ^{1} French Land Register data, which excludes lakes, ponds, glaciers > 1 km^{2} (0.386 sq mi or 247 acres) and river estuaries.

Faverges (French pronunciation: [favɛʁʒ]; Savoyard: Favèrges; Italian: Faverge) is a former commune located in Haute-Savoie department situated in the Auvergne-Rhône-Alpes region (south-east of France). On 1 January 2016, it was merged into the new commune of Faverges-Seythenex.

It occupies a glacial valley which gave birth to the Lake Annecy.

== Geology ==
Originally, at the end of the ice age, the lake extended some 30 km, from Sillingy all the way to the site of Faverges, at the base of the Dent de Cons mountain. In those times, the waters of the lake joined the river Isère, and people first settled the lakeshores and sunny slopes.

== History ==
The digs in Viuz and at the Thovey site in Faverges have yielded a great deal of information about Gallo-Roman times, some two thousand years ago. The vicus of Viuz, which covered some fifty acres (200,000 m^{2}), was an important stop along the Roman road which ran from Turin to Geneva. Merovingian times also left numerous traces on the landscape. In the Middle Ages, pre-industrial metalworks were renowned for their iron and copper tools and jewelry. Numerous forges, making nails, clasps, and all types of iron implements, were built along the rivers and streams from which they derived some of their energy needs. The Tamié Abbey was founded in 1132, and Faverges castle around 1250. At that time, Rodolphe (or "Ruph") lived a hermit's life on a nearby mountain and left his name to the hamlet of St. Ruph. The deep religious fervor of the 14th and 15th centuries is responsible for the ten chapels and sanctuaries dedicated to St. Ruph in the area.

The French Revolution left few traces on the community, except for some vandalism to the town church. In 1811, the castle was turned into a cotton-weaving factory, thus launching Faverges into the Industrial Revolution. This is a fitting heritage for a town whose name derives from the Latin faber, fabricae (manufacture).

== Economy ==
Faverges now has several important factories (Stäubli, S.T. Dupont, Bourgeois) providing some 2,500 jobs, which is especially remarkable in that Faverges itself has only some 7,000 inhabitants.

== Gallery ==
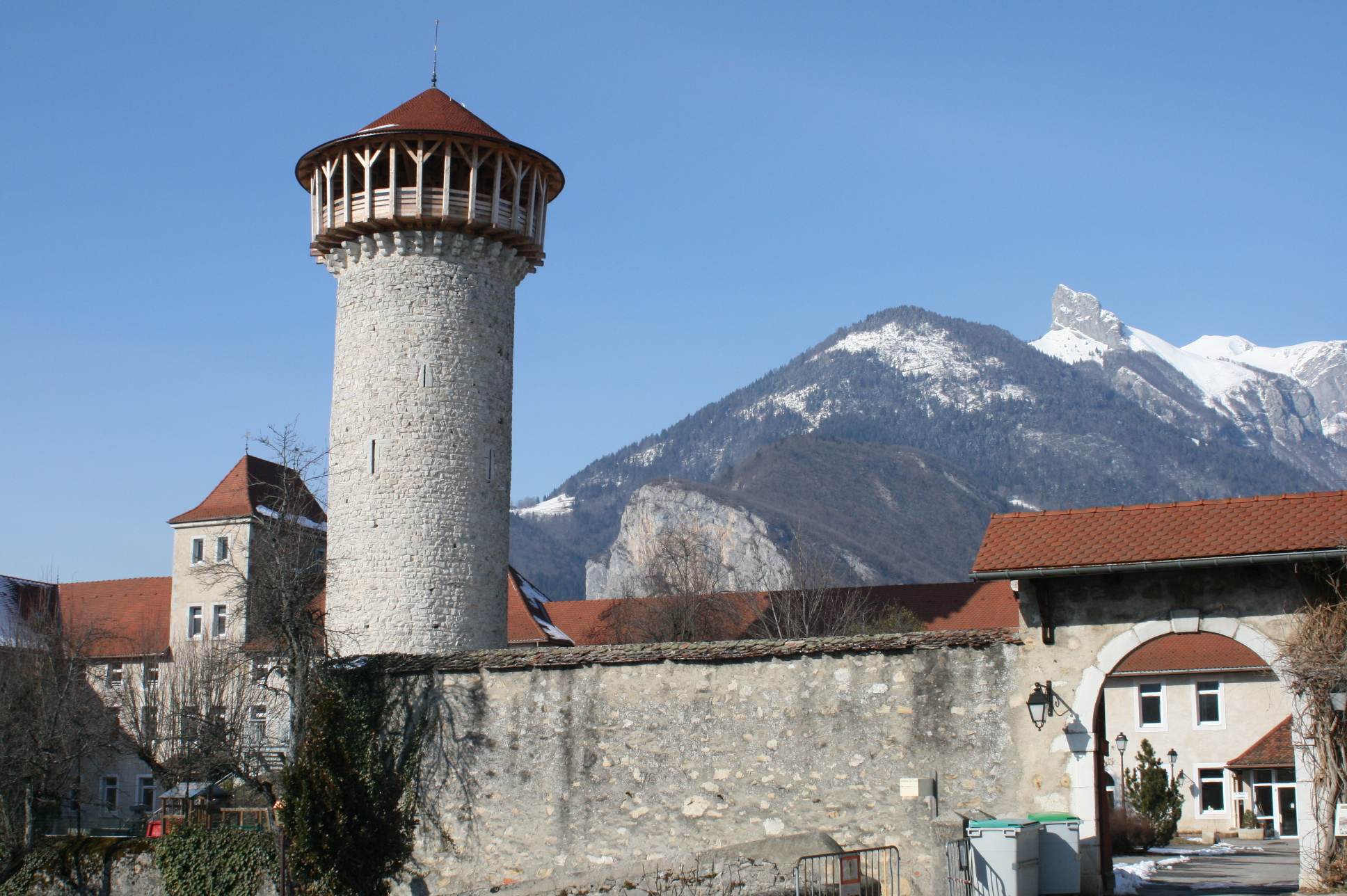
Castle of Faverges (14th century)

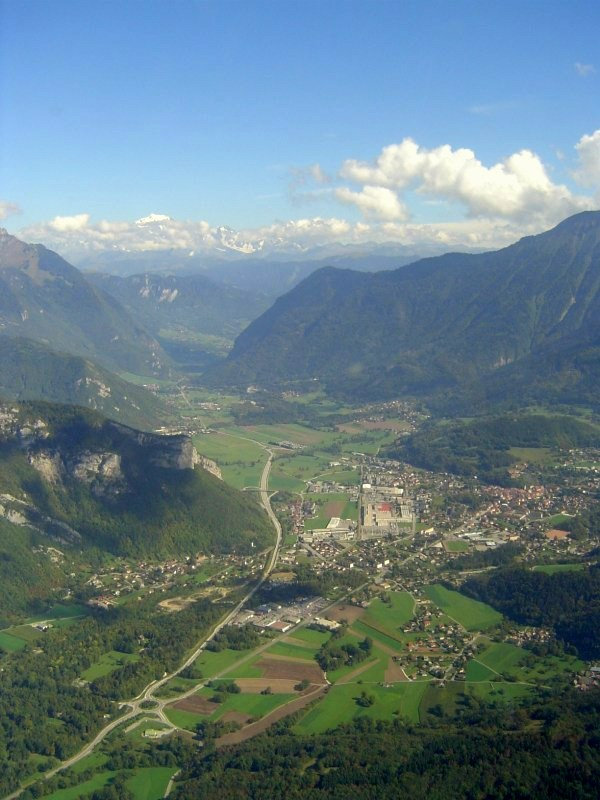
View

== See also ==
- Communes of the Haute-Savoie department
