= Lathuile =

- Commune
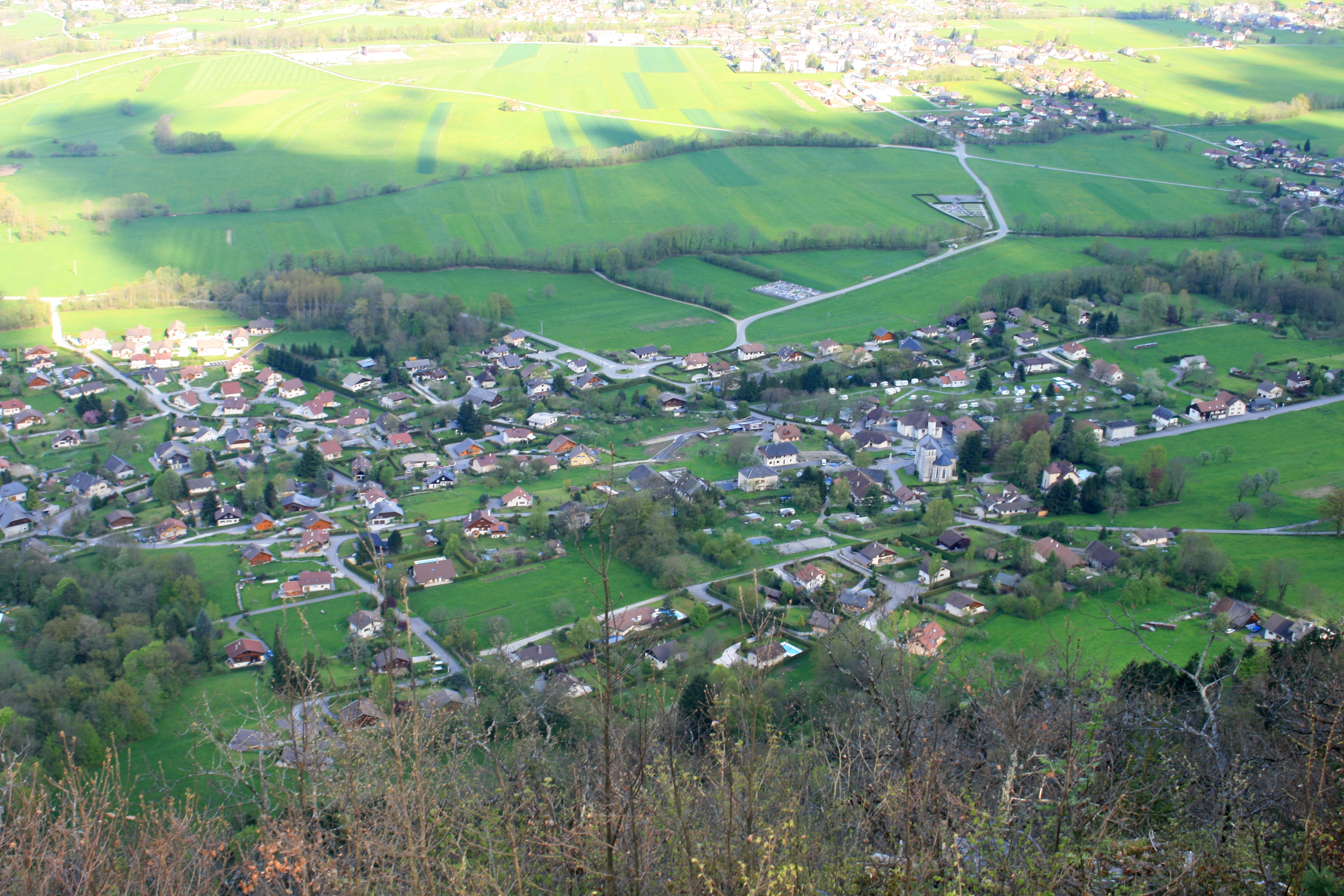
- A view of Lathuile from the nearby hillside
- Location of Lathuile
- Location within France Location within Auvergne-Rhône-Alpes
- Coordinates: 45°47′00″N 6°12′13″E
- Country: France
- Region: Auvergne-Rhône-Alpes
- Department: Haute-Savoie
- Arrondissement: Annecy
- Canton: Faverges
- Intercommunality: C.C. des Sources du Lac d'Annecy

Government
  - Mayor (2020–2026): Hervé Bourne
- Area^{1}: 8.76 km^{2} (3.38 sq mi)
- Highest elevation: 1,640 m (5,380 ft)
- Lowest elevation: 450 m (1,480 ft)
- Population (2023): 1,105
  - Density: 126/km^{2} (327/sq mi)
- Demonym: Tuilliens / Tuilliennes
- Time zone: UTC+01:00 (CET)
  - Summer (DST): UTC+02:00 (CEST)
- INSEE/Postal code: 74147 /74210
- Website: lathuile.fr
- ^{1} French Land Register data, which excludes lakes, ponds, glaciers > 1 km^{2} (0.386 sq mi or 247 acres) and river estuaries.

Lathuile (French pronunciation: [latɥil]) is a commune in the Haute-Savoie department in the Auvergne-Rhône-Alpes region in south-eastern France.

== See also ==
- Communes of the Haute-Savoie department
