= Bluffy =

Bluffy Blofi (Savoyard)
- Commune
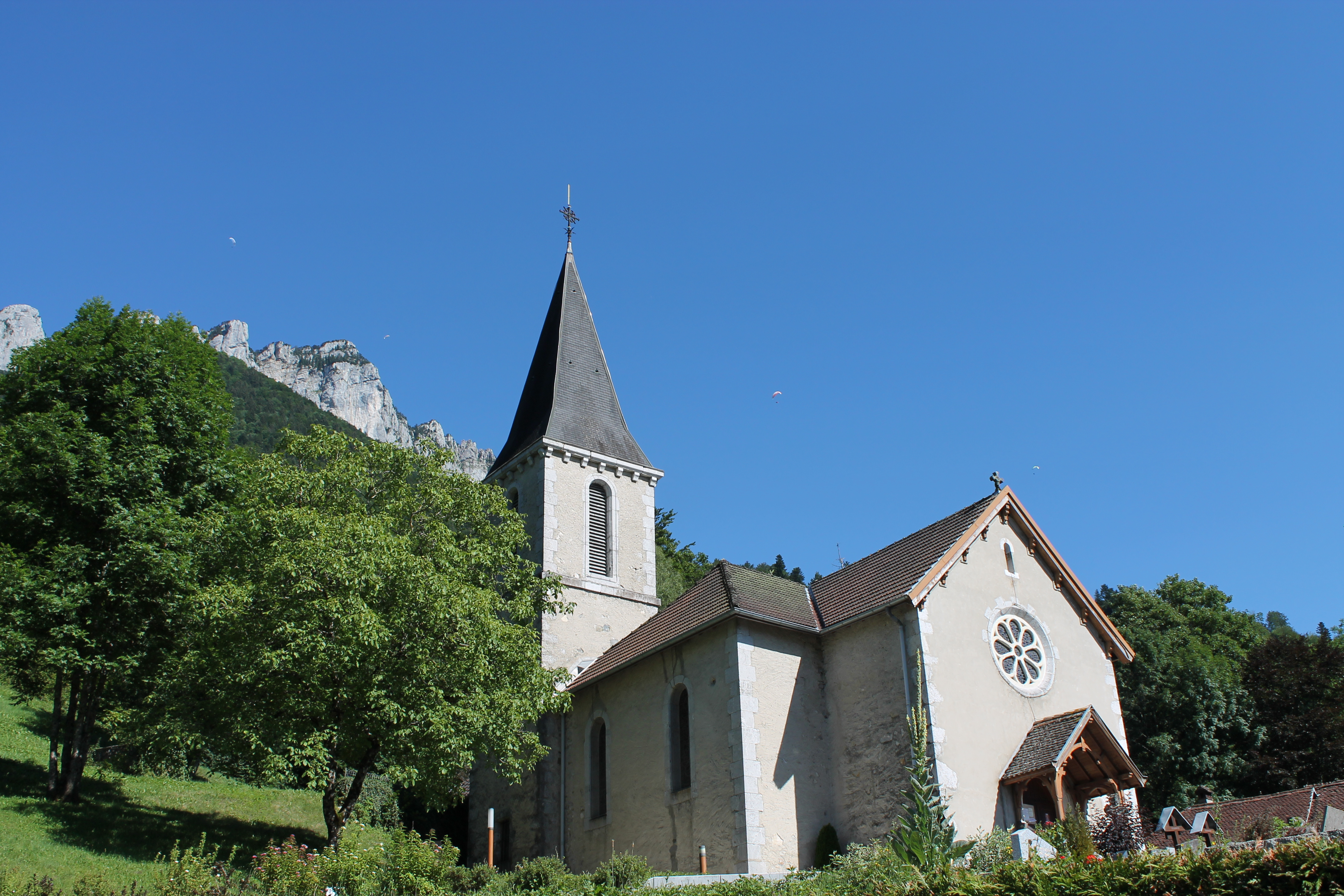
- The church of Saint-Pierre and Saint-Paul, in Bluffy
- Location of Bluffy
- Location within France Location within Auvergne-Rhône-Alpes
- Coordinates: 45°52′10″N 6°13′08″E
- Country: France
- Region: Auvergne-Rhône-Alpes
- Department: Haute-Savoie
- Arrondissement: Annecy
- Canton: Faverges
- Intercommunality: CA Grand Annecy

Government
  - Mayor (2020–2026): Olivier Trimbur
- Area^{1}: 3.74 km^{2} (1.44 sq mi)
- Highest elevation: 1,800 m (5,900 ft)
- Lowest elevation: 574 m (1,883 ft)
- Population (2023): 395
  - Density: 106/km^{2} (274/sq mi)
- Demonym: Bluffétien / Bluffétienne
- Time zone: UTC+01:00 (CET)
  - Summer (DST): UTC+02:00 (CEST)
- INSEE/Postal code: 74036 /74290
- ^{1} French Land Register data, which excludes lakes, ponds, glaciers > 1 km^{2} (0.386 sq mi or 247 acres) and river estuaries.

Bluffy (French pronunciation: [blyfi]; Savoyard: Blofi) is a commune in the Haute-Savoie department in the Auvergne-Rhône-Alpes region in south-eastern France.

== See also ==
- Communes of the Haute-Savoie department
