= Doussard =

- Commune
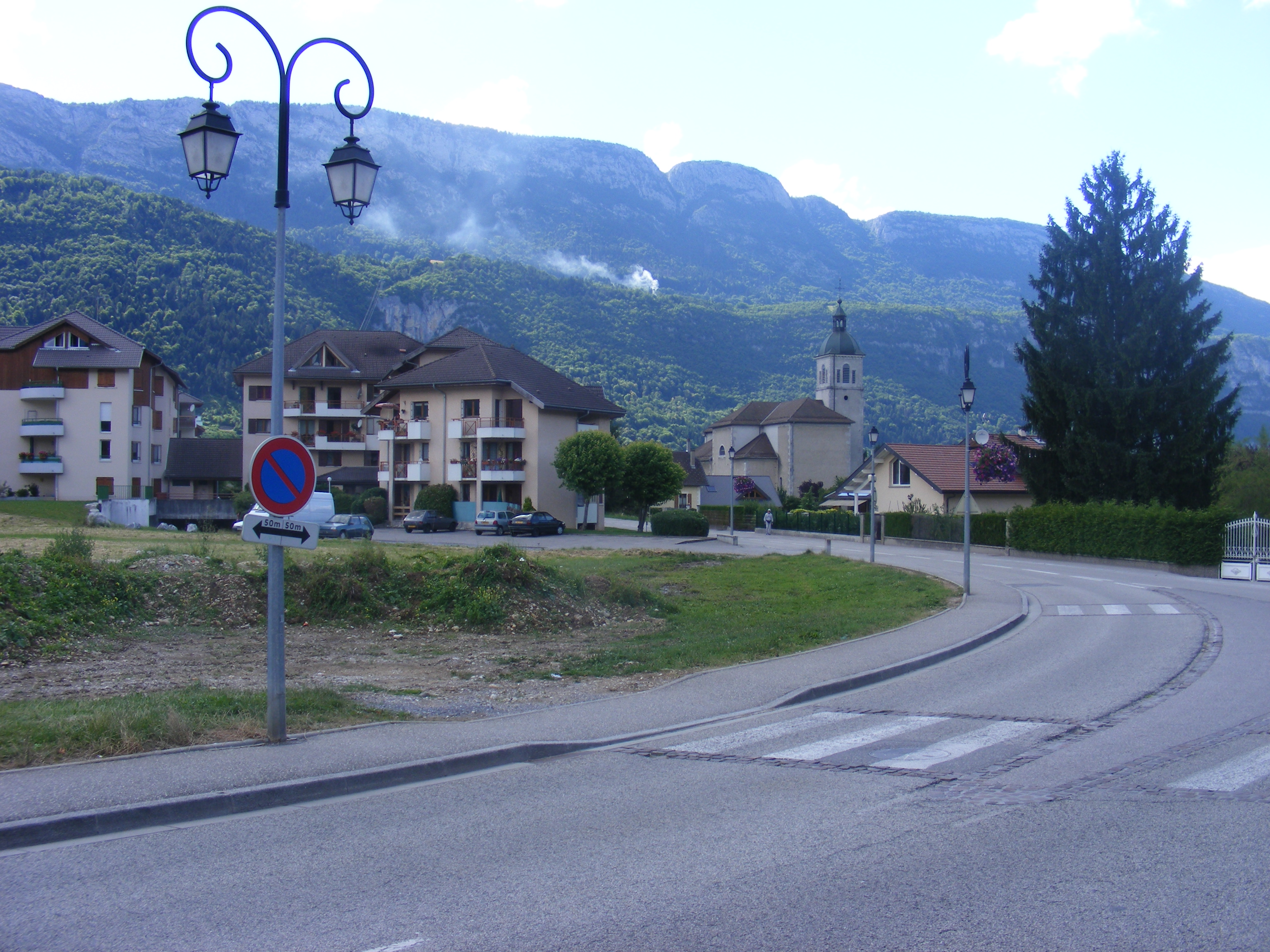
- Doussard
- Location of Doussard
- Location within France Location within Auvergne-Rhône-Alpes
- Coordinates: 45°46′36″N 6°13′16″E
- Country: France
- Region: Auvergne-Rhône-Alpes
- Department: Haute-Savoie
- Arrondissement: Annecy
- Canton: Faverges
- Intercommunality: C.C. des Sources du Lac d'Annecy

Government
  - Mayor (2023–2026): Marielle Juilien
- Area^{1}: 20.14 km^{2} (7.78 sq mi)
- Highest elevation: 1,804 m (5,919 ft)
- Lowest elevation: 442 m (1,450 ft)
- Population (2023): 3,751
  - Density: 186.2/km^{2} (482.4/sq mi)
- Demonym: Doussardiens
- Time zone: UTC+01:00 (CET)
  - Summer (DST): UTC+02:00 (CEST)
- INSEE/Postal code: 74104 /74210
- Website: Ville-doussard.fr
- ^{1} French Land Register data, which excludes lakes, ponds, glaciers > 1 km^{2} (0.386 sq mi or 247 acres) and river estuaries.

Doussard (French pronunciation: [dusaʁ]) is a commune in the southeastern French department of Haute-Savoie.

The village contains a landing field used by many paragliders, usually after they've taken off from the nearby Col de la Forclaz.

== Population ==
Historical population
Year	Pop.	±% p.a.
1968	1,239	—
1975	1,543	+3.18%
1982	1,725	+1.61%
1990	2,070	+2.31%
1999	2,781	+3.34%
2007	3,347	+2.34%
2012	3,573	+1.32%
2017	3,592	+0.11%
2023	3,751	+0.72%
Source: INSEE

== See also ==
- Communes of the Haute-Savoie department
