= Dent de Cons =

Mountain in France

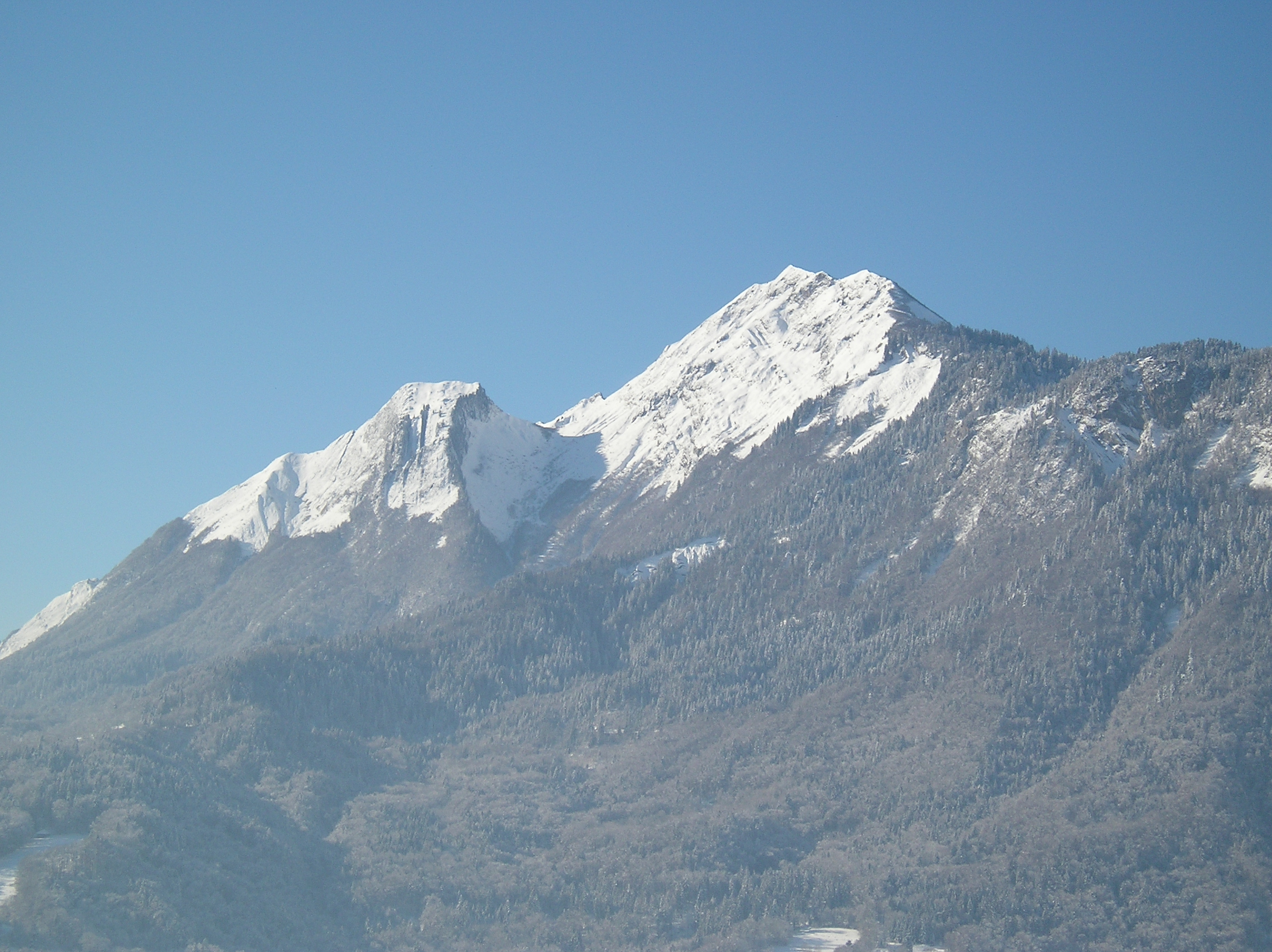
- Dent de Cons

Highest point
- Elevation: 2,062 m (6,765 ft)
- Prominence: 1,155 m (3,789 ft)
- Coordinates: 45°43′47″N 06°21′04″E

Geography
- Location within Alps
- Country: France
- Region: Auvergne-Rhône-Alpes
- Departments: Savoie and Haute-Savoie
- Parent range: Bauges

Dent de Cons is a mountain of Savoie and Haute-Savoie, France. It lies in the Bauges range of the French Prealps and has an elevation of 2,062 metres (6,765 ft).
