= Stäubli =

Swiss mechatronics company

Stäubli International AG
- Type: Aktiengesellschaft
- Industry: mechatronics, industrial
- Founded: 1892; 134 years ago
- Founder: Hermann Stäubli; Rudolph Schelling
- Headquarters: Pfäffikon, Schwyz, Switzerland
- Number of locations: 15 production sites; business units in 28 countries.
- Products: dobby looms, weaving machines, connectors, robots, robot tool changer, quick mold change
- Revenue: >1,600,000,000 CHF
- Number of employees: 6,000
- Parent: Stäubli Holding AG
- Divisions: Textile, Fluid Connectors, Electrical Connectors, Robotics
- Subsidiaries: Deimo; Schönherr
- Website: www.staubli.com

Stäubli (in English usually written as Staubli) is a Swiss industrial and mechatronic solution provider with four dedicated divisions: Electrical Connectors, Fluid Connectors, Robotics and Textile.

== History ==
Stäubli was founded in 1892 as Schelling & Stäubli, in Horgen, Switzerland, by Rudolph Schelling and Hermann Stäubli. It was a workshop specialized in producing dobby looms. In 1909, the company opened a new manufacturing site in Faverges, Haute-Savoie, France. After the death of Rudolph Schelling in the same year, the company was renamed to Gebrüder Stäubli ("Stäubli Bros.").

In 1956, the company diversified its line of products into the field of hydraulics and pneumatics and commenced the production of rapid action couplings. The Connectors division was born. In 1969, they acquired the German dobby producer Erich Trumpelt (founded 1954 in Bayreuth) and changed the company name to "Stäubli & Trumpelt". In 1982 the company diversified again, this time into automation and robotics. In 1983, they acquired French competitor Verdol SA and established Stäubli – Verdol SARL in Lyon-Chassieu, France.

In 1989, Stäubli took over American competitor Unimation from Westinghouse, including their British division located in Telford, UK. In 1994, they took over Zellweger Weaving Systems in Sargans, Switzerland. In 2002 Stäubli acquired a majority stake in Multi-Contact, a leading provider of electrical connectors, which became "Stäubli Electrical Connectors" in 2017. In 2004, they acquired German competitor Bosch Rexroth's robotics division and incorporated their products into their own product line. In 2007 the Stäubli Group acquired a stake in the Italian electronic engineering company DEIMO.

== Divisions ==
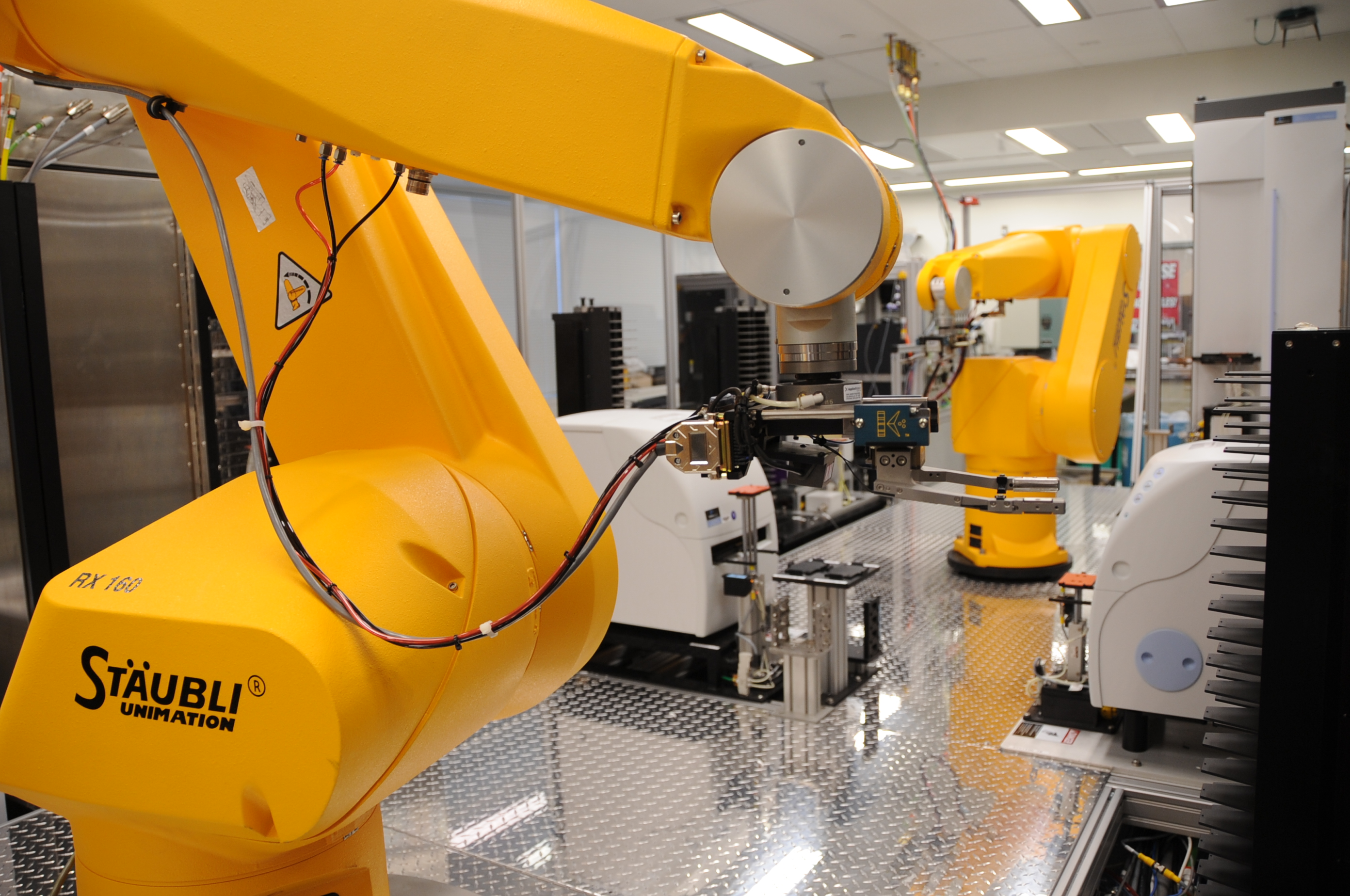
Stäubli robots used in chemical genomics

Since its foundation in 1892, Stäubli has expanded into four different lines of products and services

- Electrical Connectors manufactures electrical connectors and other devices for industrial applications ranging from miniature to high-performance. In photovoltaics, Stäubli created the original MC4 connector.
- Fluid Connectors manufactures quick connector systems used for all types of fluids, gases and electrical power. Its products include robot tool changers, end-of-arm tooling solutions, multi-coupling systems and quick mold-change systems.
- Robotics manufacturers automation- and robotics-related products including a broad range of four- and six-axis robots. This includes robotic arms designed specifically for sensitive environments, autonomous mobile robots, driver-less transport systems (AGVs) and cobots for human–robot collaboration.
- Textile is the division of the company's original field of products, with a range of weaving technologies: cam motions, dobby looms, Jacquard looms and drawing-in, leasing and warp-tying machines for preparation.

== Company overview ==
With a workforce of 6,000, the Stäubli Group generates a yearly turnover of 1.6 billion Swiss francs (CHF). The company has 15 industrial production sites as well as presence through business units and agents in 50 countries. Production sites include the following: Allschwil; Bayreuth; Carate Brianza; Chemnitz; Duncan, South Carolina; Essen; Faverges; Hangzhou; Hésingue; Lyon; Sargans; and Weil am Rhein.
