= MC3 connector =

PV connectors MC3: Old-style Weatherproof DC connectors.

MC3 connectors are a fully discontinued type of single-contact connector commonly used for connecting solar panels. MC3 are named for the original manufacturer Multi-Contact (now part of Stäubli Electrical Connectors) with a 3 mm contact assembly pin. They have a certification rating of 1KV (IEC) / 600V (UL) and 30A (10AWG PV Cable).

== Launch ==
MC3 Connectors were launched by Multi-Contact Company (Now Staubli Electrical Connectors) in 1996. MC3 refers to Multi-Contact with its 3mm PV connector.

== Physical properties ==
The MC3 connectors incorporate a flexible watertight seal and are supplied as 'male' and 'female' types the prevent cross-connections. For proper application usage, they must be terminated to accurately sized UV resistant, correct diameter cable.

== Obsolescence ==
In 2008, NEC banned the opening of PV connectors under load as the push-fit connectors were required to contain positive locking mechanisms controlled by certified, product-specific tools. The MC3 PV connector did not meet these requirements, but its successor, MC4 PV connectors, which were launched in 2004 provided the fundamental mechanism leading to widespread market acceptance. Eventually, the MC3 Connectors were officially discontinued in 2016.
