= Canton of Faverges-Seythenex =

Coordinates: 45.74°N 6.30°E

Situation of the canton in the department of Haute-Savoie

The canton of Faverges-Seythenex (before 2021: Faverges) is an administrative division of the Haute-Savoie department, southeastern France. Its borders were modified at the French canton reorganisation which came into effect in March 2015. Its seat is in Faverges-Seythenex.

It consists of the following communes:

1. Alex
2. La Balme-de-Thuy
3. Bluffy
4. Le Bouchet-Mont-Charvin
5. Chevaline
6. Les Clefs
7. La Clusaz
8. Dingy-Saint-Clair
9. Doussard
10. Faverges-Seythenex
11. Giez
12. Glières-Val-de-Borne (partly)
13. Le Grand-Bornand
14. Lathuile
15. Manigod
16. Menthon-Saint-Bernard
17. Saint-Ferréol
18. Saint-Jean-de-Sixt
19. Serraval
20. Talloires-Montmin
21. Thônes
22. Val-de-Chaise
23. Veyrier-du-Lac
24. Les Villards-sur-Thônes
