= Albanais =

Savoyard region in France

The Albanais is a small Savoyard region situated between Lake Annecy and Lac du Bourget, at the entrance to the Parc naturel régional du Massif des Bauges. Located in the French departments of Savoie and Haute-Savoie, its principal city is Rumilly. The name Albanais comes from the Latin Albinnum, which is derived from the names of the tribes Albii (or Albani) whose presence is attested to in the toponymy of places such as Albens, Alby, and Albigny.

== Geography ==
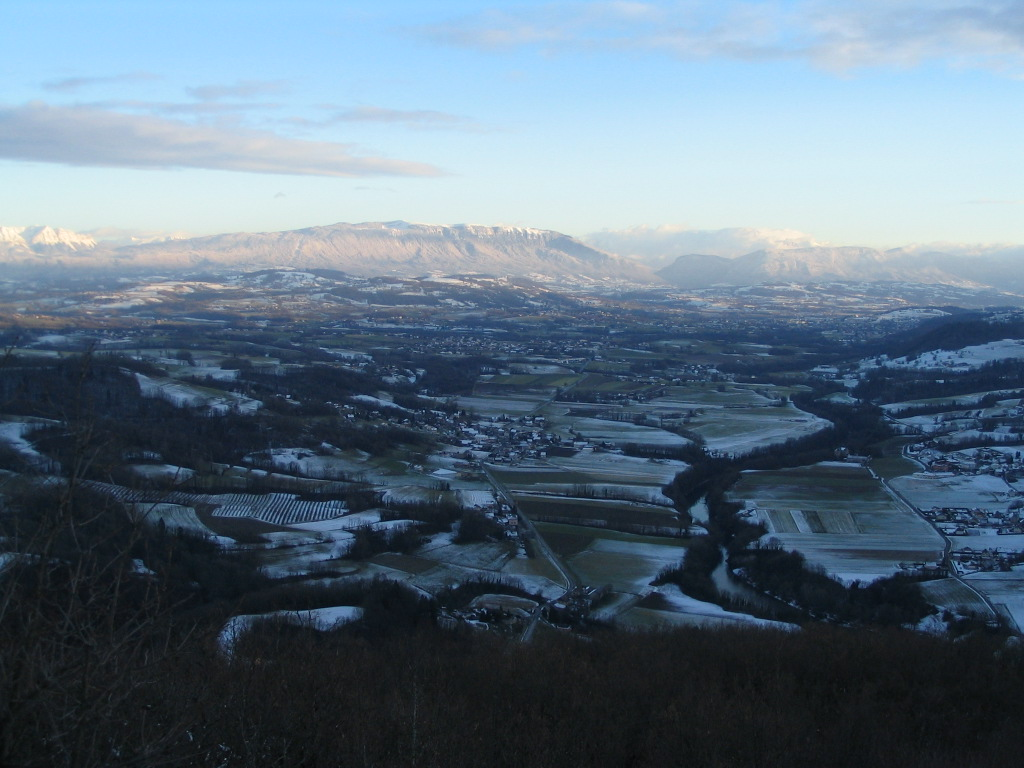
The snow-covered Albanais, as viewed from the Princes Mountains with the Semnoz in the background

The region extends from 30 kilometres (19 mi) north to south and from 10 to 20 kilometres (6.2 to 12.4 mi) east to west, widening above Annecy. Its terrain is a rolling peneplain, broadside at a pad of calcareous mountains to the east (the Semnoz, Mont Bange, Mont Revard) and to the west (Princes Mountains, Gros Foug, Clergeon, Cessens and La Biolle Mountains), which are attached respectively to the prealps and the Jura Mountains.

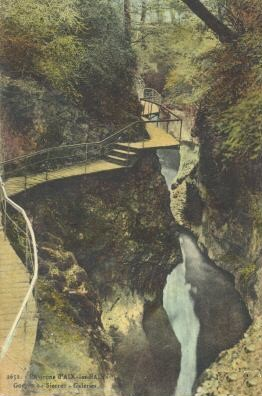
An old postcard of the gorge carved by the Sierroz

The region is bordered to the south by Lac du Bourget and extends to the north in the former Savoy province of Genevois. The median altitude varies from 300 to 600 metres (980 to 1,970 ft) within the plain. Its easterly border at its most abrupt reaches more than 1,700 metres (5,600 ft) at Semnoz, the final peak of the Bauges Mountains. The western border rises gently to slightly less than 1,000 metres (3,300 ft), which overhangs the Chautagne valley almost at 700 metres (2,300 ft) (the left bank of the Rhone, north of Lac du Bourget). In clear weather, the Chartreuse Mountains above Chambéry are visible to the south; the Mandallaz and Salève are visible to the north, beyond which Gex and Geneva are visible. Various slopes of lesser elevation, the Bornes Massif (La Tournette, Dents de Lanfon, Parmelan), the Aravis Range, Faucigny, and the Voirons up to Mont Blanc outside Rumilly (located behind Bornes) are visible to the northeast.

The principal rivers are the Fier, which travels through the Bornes whose source is at Lake Annecy, and the Chéran, sourced from the Bauges. The Fier leaves the Albanais to the west via a water gap at Val-de-Fier, at an opening between the Princes Mountains and Gros Foug, from there she enters the Rhone downstream from Seyssel. The outlet of Chéran in the Albanais at Allèves, Semnoz and Mont Bange. The Sierroz, a short intermittent mountain stream, also runs into Lac du Bourget. These turbulent rivers carved out of the Albanais sandstone narrow gorges 10 to 30 metres (33 to 98 ft) deep.

== History ==
The remains of human presence dating to the Neolithic were discovered in the commune of Gruffy.

In early Roman times, a citadel was built in Rumilly.

Under the reign of Charlemagne, the Sapaudia (in actuality Savoy) was divided into seven districts, one of which was Rumilly and the pagus albanensis, corresponding to an area slightly larger than the current day Albanais.

In January 867 Lothaire de Lorraine, a king of the Roman Empire, legally donated land to his wife, the queen Thiedberge, which included the Albanais communes of Ariacum (Héry-sur-Alby), Belmontem (Balmont), and Virilgum (a Vergloz hamlet). In November of 879, the land donation of king Boso of Provence to the abbey of Tournus involved the Albanais communes of curtem Caldatis (a hamlet of Chaux), curtem que Verilico (a hamlet of Vergloz), curtem Tudesio (Thusy), and villam Ariaco indominicatam (Héry-sur-Alby). These holdings were donated along with serfs of both sex and the churches which they depended on.

The Albanais from then on joined the history of Savoy: in 1630 as well as from 1690 to 1697, the Savoyard States were invaded by the troops of Louis XIV of France and in 1792, the lands of Savoy were freed for the first time from the House of Savoy and was occupied by French Revolutionary forces up until 1814. After briefly being part of the Kingdom of Sardinia, a referendum ratifying the Treaty of Turin validated the annexation of Savoy to France in 1860, after which Savoy was split into the two departments of Savoie and Haute-Savoie.

== Administration ==
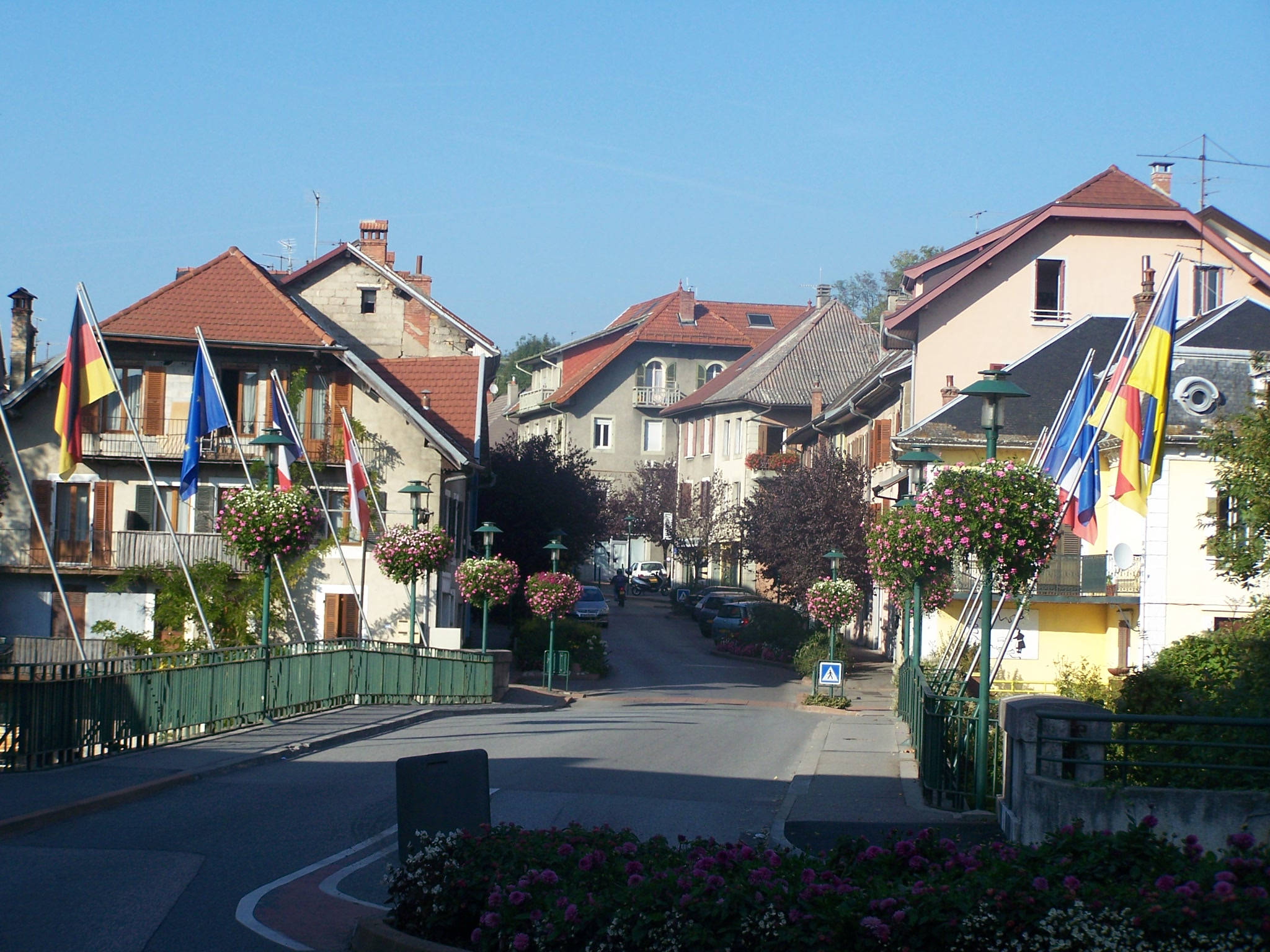
The bridge over the Chéran River in Rumilly

The Albanais historically covered an area slightly larger than its current day limits. There are currently 37 communes in the following three cantons:

- Canton of Rumilly (Haute-Savoie) – 22,789 inhabitants (1999), 170.81 square kilometres (65.95 mi^{2}):
  - Communes of Bloye, Boussy, Crempigny-Bonneguête, Étercy, Hauteville-sur-Fier, Lornay, Marcellaz-Albanais, Marigny-Saint-Marcel, Massingy, Moye, Rumilly (capital), Sales, Saint-Eusèbe, Thusy, Val-de-Fier, Vallières, Vaulx, Versonnex
- Canton of Alby-sur-Chéran (Haute-Savoie) – 9,957 inhabitants (1999), 96.98 square kilometres (37.44 mi^{2}):
  - Communes of Alby-sur-Chéran (capital), Allèves, Chainaz-les-Frasses, Chapeiry, Cusy, Gruffy, Héry-sur-Alby, Mûres, Saint-Félix, Saint-Sylvestre, Viuz-la-Chiésaz
- Canton of Albens (Savoie) – 6,512 inhabitants (1999), 69.5 square kilometres (26.8 mi^{2}):
  - Communes of Albens (capital), La Biolle, Cessens, Épersy, Mognard, Saint-Germain-la-Chambotte, Saint-Girod, Saint-Ours

One could also include in the Albanais part of the Canton of Seynod (the communes Chavanod, Montagny-les-Lanches, Quintal, Cran-Gevrier, Seynod, the former villages Chaux-Balmont and Vieugy), as well as parts of the Canton of Grésy-sur-Aix (the communes Grésy-sur-Aix, Saint-Offenge-Dessus, Saint-Offenge-Dessous, Montcel), respectively included in the urban agglomerations of Annecy and Aix-les-Bains.

== Economy ==
The Albanais is majorly rural but the agricultural economy benefits from a diffuse urbanization that differently affects all communes. New residents and the younger generations generally work in the urban and peri-urban zones of Rumilly, Aix-les-Bains, Annecy, or further out in Chambéry and Geneva.

Regardless, agriculture retains importance, especially the breeding of dairy cows. The making of butter and tomme from milk was done via communal labor until recently. These factories have largely closed in the last two decades of the twentieth century. Two modern tomme manufacturers were built near Gruffy and Sales, but the milk production of the region largely exceeds their capacity. The Albanais has longtime been a home to two important industrial milk producers: Lait Mont-Blanc in Rumilly, which produced condensed milk until it was purchased by Nestlé and began producing cereals; and the cheesemaker Picon in Saint-Félix, which produced crème de gruyère and was purchased by Bel in 1968, finally closing in 2001. An important cheese production center still exists in Vallières.

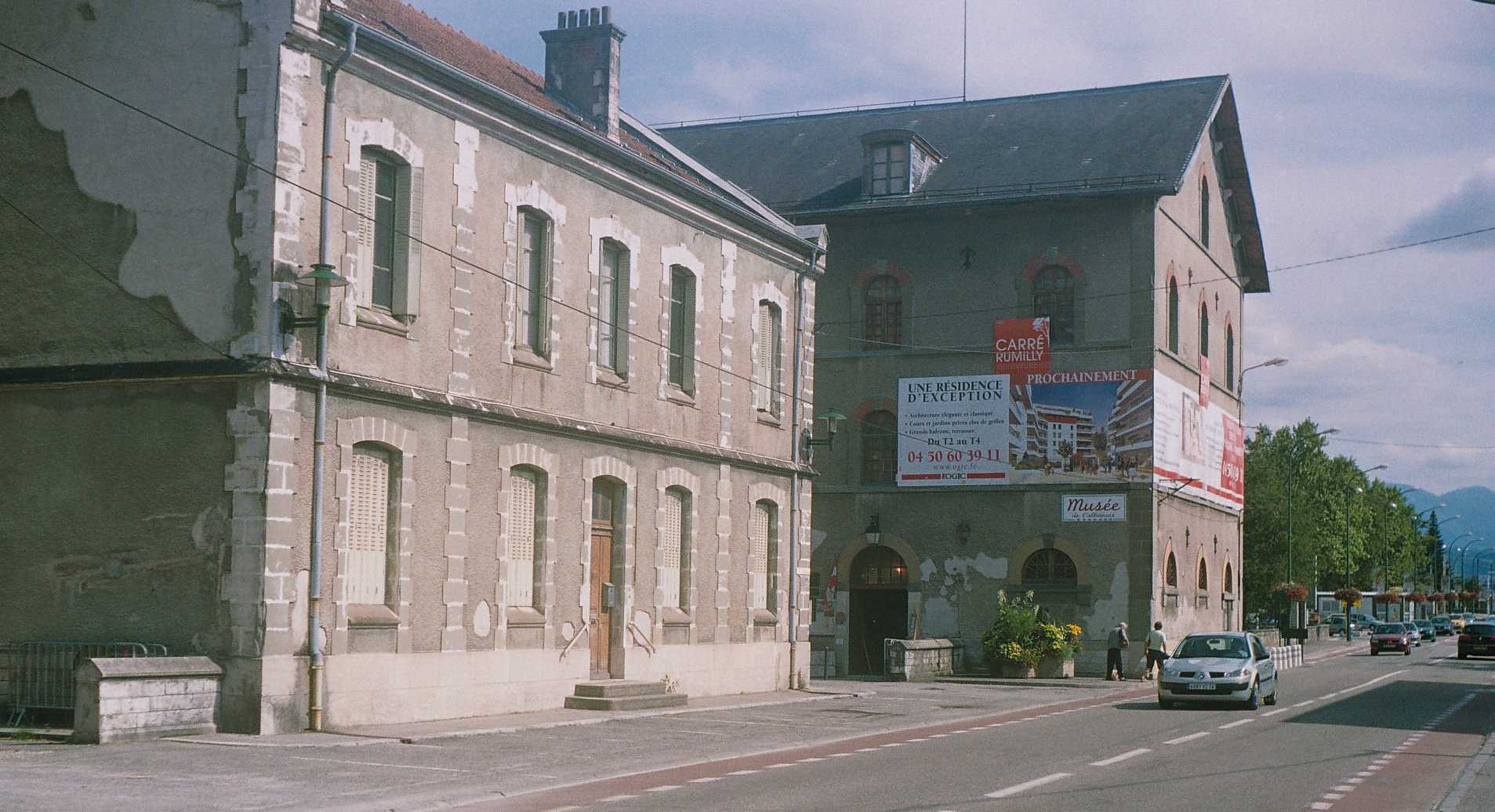
The former tobacco manufacturer in Rumilly

The Albanais played an important part in the tobacco culture in France for nearly a century. Multiples rare tobacco dryers remained in production until they were abandoned in 1960, and thus a former tobacco manufacturer in Rumilly whose building was in part sacrificed for a real estate program. Tobacco crops ceded their place in the countryside to maize destined for fodder.

There were previously granaries, whose mills were still functioning up until the 1950s. Either demolished or transformed into housing; they can still be seen in their location at the bottoms of valleys.

Wheat was unable to be milled from the small machines run on hydroelectric power. There were also sawmills, oil mills, and small power stations (in fact, Alby was one of the first communes in France to have electricity).

Timber, mostly spruce and beech, is harvested slightly throughout the region, particularly in the dominial forests of the bordering mountainous regions. Several villages also have sawmills and workshops that are used to construct woodworking joints.

The cultivation of hazel nuts has essential disappeared, with the exception of on the slopes of Clergeon, as well as vineyards. Some vestiges of oil mills are remembered through the toponymy of place names. Orchards (apples, pears, cherries, prunes, etc.) have largely disappeared with the exception of the basin of Rumilly, where pears are cultivated on a relatively large scale.

Alby-sur-Chéran for a longtime specialized in shoemaking. A small museum retraces the history of the former factory on the Place du Trophée.

In Rumilly there is an important industrial zone (Tefal, Nestlé, and formerly Lait Mont-Blanc and Salomon which closed in 2008), as well as in Alby-sur-Chéran (Galderma). Two new intercommunal economic activity zones (ZAEs, zone d'activités économiques) are under construction, one in the sector of Martenez and another in Surchères. These industrial and commercial zones extend into the communes of Seynod, Chavanod, and Cran-Gevrier, which border Annecy and Grésy-sur-Aix, near Aix-les-Bains.

In the last few years, numerous logistical services were installed and developed in the region, that have either benefited or suffered from the presence of the autoroute. However, these service industries generally pay less and require less skilled trades than the industries that have historically operated in Rumilly and the surrounding areas.

La Poste has recently implanted its new industrial mail sorter for the departments of Savoie and Haute-Savoie, in the industrial zone of Balvay in Rumilly at an investment cost of €31 million. The sorting center has seven machines each capable of sorting 35,000 letters per hour. As a result, the regional post offices no longer sort their mail and are able to restructure their larger buildings for other purposes. Part of the main post office in Annecy was transformed into residential housing in 2008-2009.

== Transportation ==
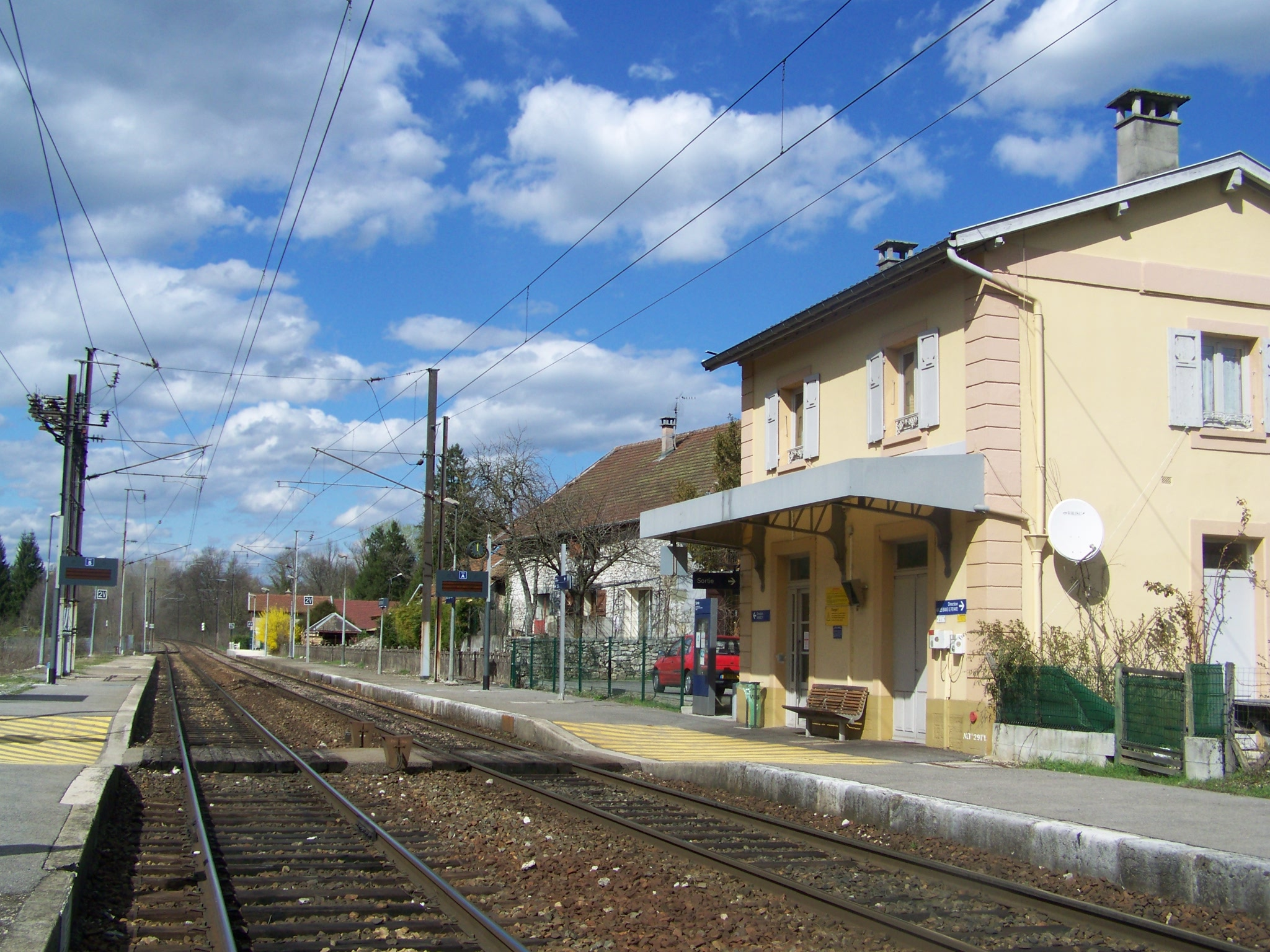
The Gare de Grésy-sur-Aix

The A41 autoroute, built in the 1970s, crosses the Albanais with exits at Albens/Aix-Nord (14), Alby-Rumilly (15), and Annecy-Sud (16). A new exit is under construction at Chaux, between the existing exits 15 and 16.

The other routes de grande circulation in the region are the D1201 between Aix-les-Bains and Annecy, which was a route nationale (N201) until its declassification in 2008. Other routes départementales include the D910 between Rumilly and Albens, the D16 (also called the route des Creuses) connecting Annecy to Rumilly, the D14, which follows the narrow passage of the Fier to reach the Chautagne, and the D911, which passes through the Chéran valley to enter the Bauges.

The territory is also well served by the Aix-les-Bains-Annecy railway. The Gare de Rumilly is the principal station of the territory and is served by TGV trains. Two secondary train stations are also in operation, the Gare de Grésy-sur-Aix and Gare d'Albens. Train stations at Lovagny, Hauteville-sur-Fier and Bloye were closed in the 1990s with the abandonment of the bus.

Two motor coach companies connect Aix-les-Bains and Annecy via Alby-sur-Chéran and Saint-Félix.

The closest airports, other than the diminutive Annecy - Haute-Savoie - Mont Blanc Airport and the Chambéry Airport, which specializes in low-cost international and business flights, are the international airports Lyon-Saint Exupéry Airport and Geneva International Airport.

== Places and monuments ==
=== Castles ===
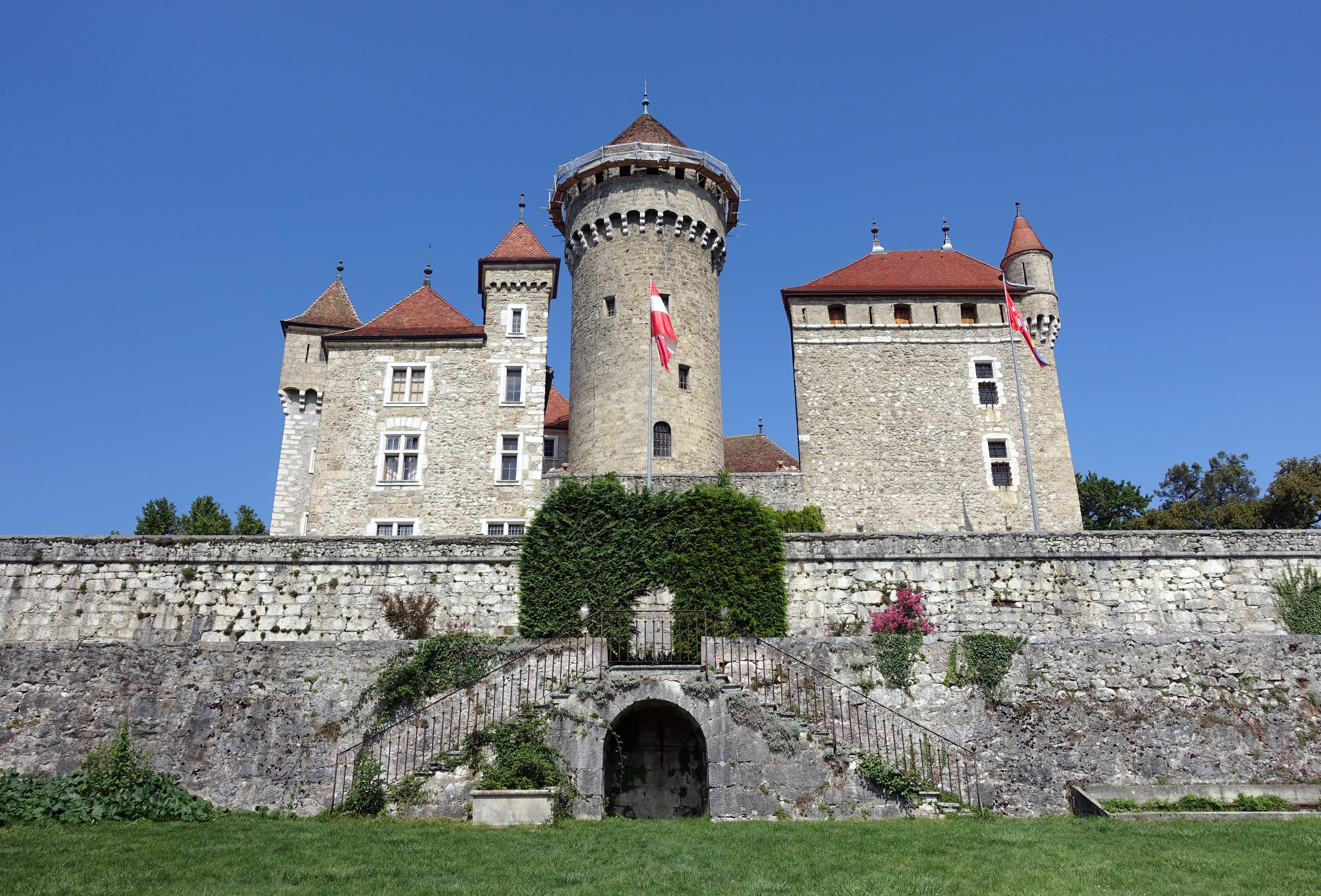
The Château de Montrottier

- Château de Montrottier (14th century) in Lovagny
- Château de Pieuillet in Marcellaz-Albanais
- Château de Pierrecharve in Mûres, located atop a rock of molasse and dating at least to the 12th century
- Château de Songy, former remains of the Seigneurs de Songy in Saint-Sylvestre

=== Museums ===
- Musée de l'Albanais à Rumilly – created by the local history society les Amis du Vieux Rumilly et de l'Albanais (Friends of old Rumilly and the Albanais), was closed in August 2008 for reconstruction, will be in reopened in 2010 at a size of 1,300 square metres (14,000 ft^{2}), an increase from its former 400 square metres (4,300 ft^{2})
- Musée d'histoire naturelle de Gruffy – a natural history museum which integrates an apiary and an interpretive path
- Musée de la cordonnerie à Alby-sur-Chéran – a shoemaking museum which showcases the tools and machines used over the centuries
- A former grain mill in Mûres complete with hydraulic machines and a baker's oven

=== Religious monuments ===
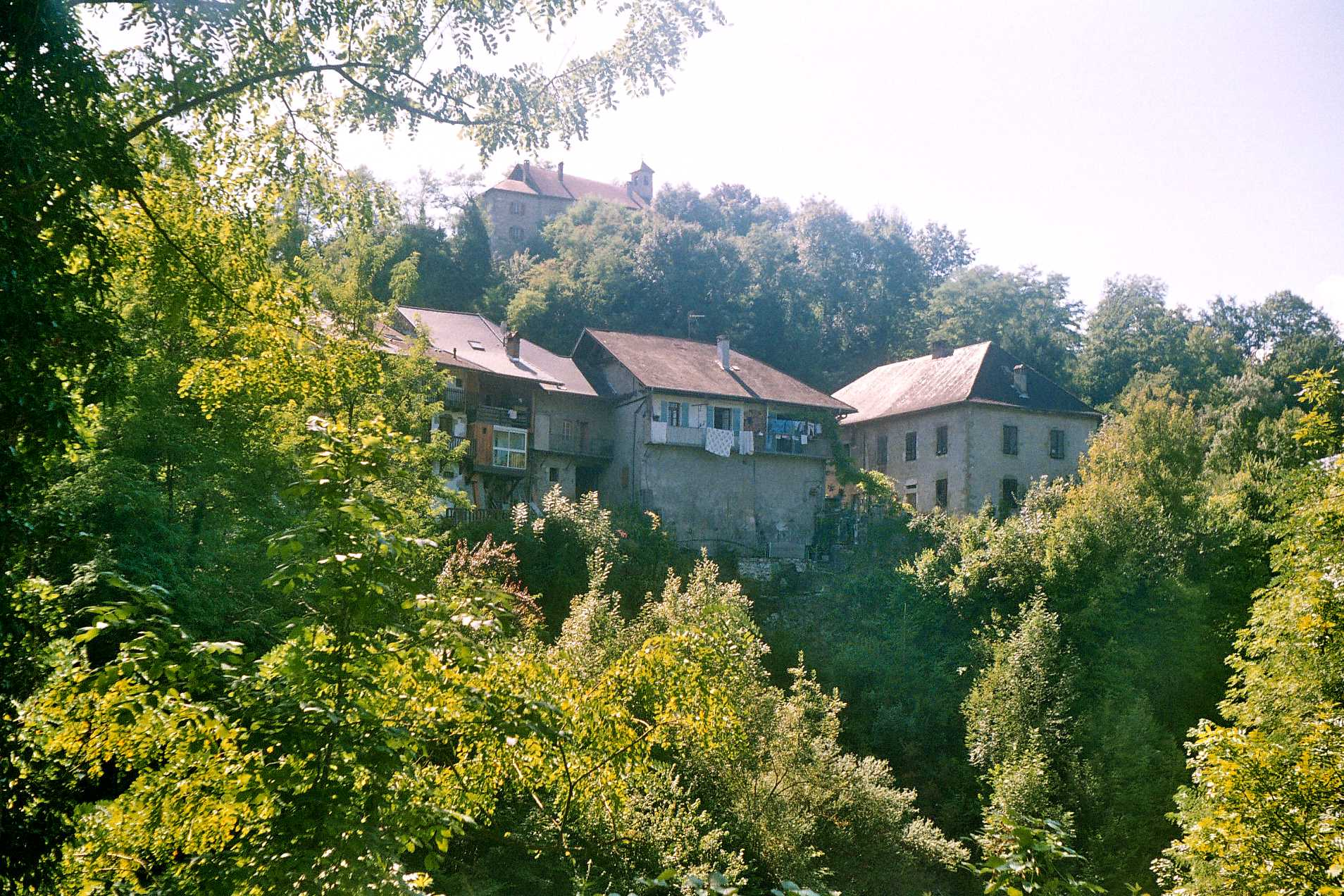
The Chapelle Saint-Maurice above nearby housing in Alby-sur-Chéran

- Chapelle Saint-Maurice à Alby-sur-Chéran – chœur roman, stained glasses of 1925 represent the saints of Savoy and the heraldry of Alby nobility
- Notre-Dame de l'Aumône (Rumilly) – dating to the 13th century, contains vestiges of a former hospice
- Église Notre-Dame du Plainpalais at Alby-sur-Chéran – created by the architect Novarina in 1954, the church was inspired by Byzantine architecture and has a cylindrical bell tower 22 metres (72 ft) tall, which is pierced by 108 attic windows and resembles certain aspects of castles
- Église de Rumilly – a Sardinian-style church in the neo-classic style, was built in 1837 and has a bell tower dating to the twelfth century. Trompe-l'œil paintings in the church include those by Laurent Baud, stained glass constructed by the Lyon master Pagnon, as well as an organ by Joseph Merklin
- Église du Thusy – dating to the 16th century, the church has a nave unique to Sardinian style which was restored in 1825, the bell tower with an entrance dates to 1663

=== Parks and gardens ===
- Jardins secrets de Vaulx – Private garden, which from east to west has more than 7,000 square metres (75,000 ft^{2}) of plantations, mosaics, and ouvrages en bois; the garden is divided into multiple thematic indoor and outdoor sections

=== Bridges ===
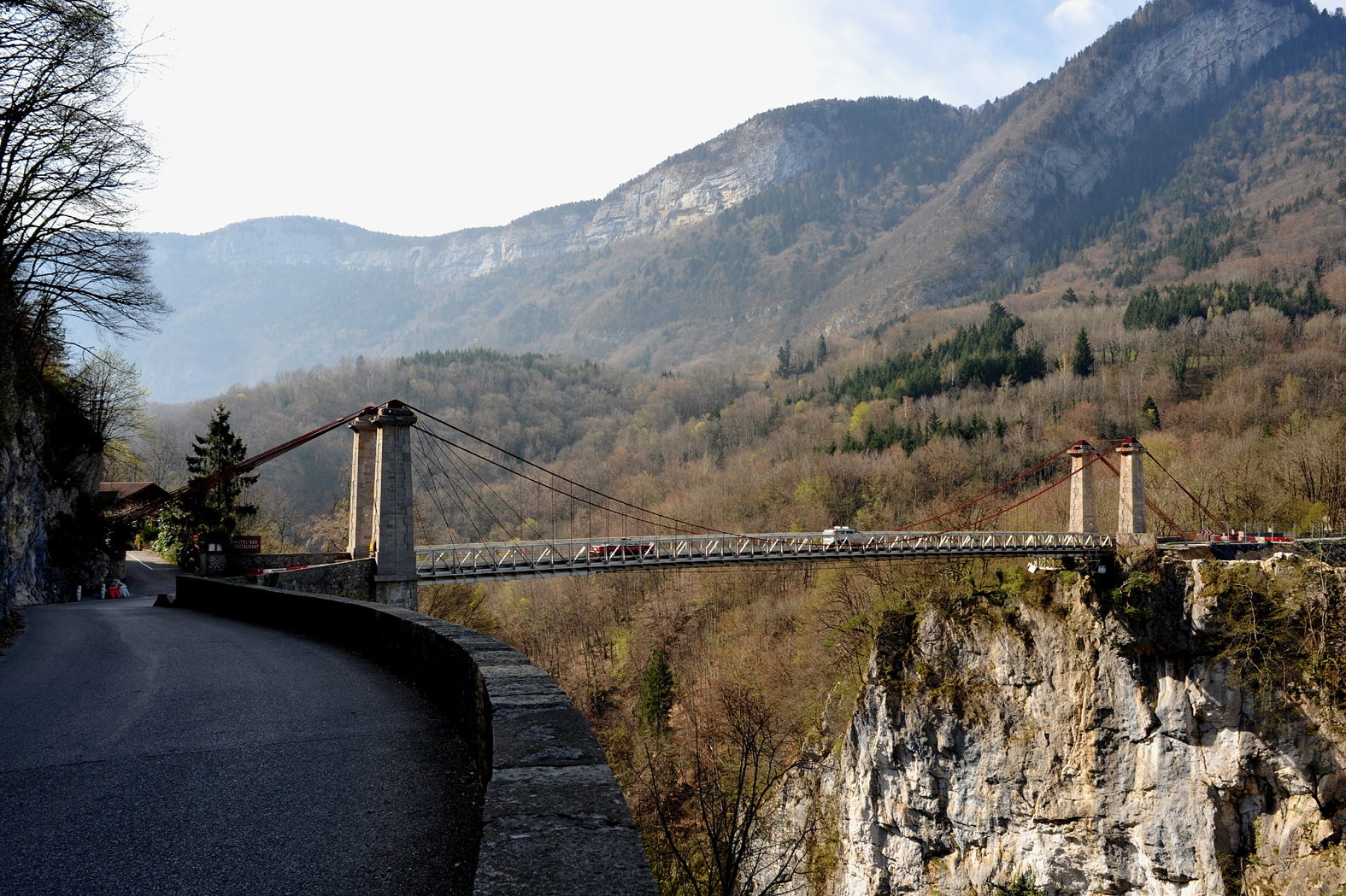
The Pont de l'Abîme in springtime

- Pont de l'Abîme – a suspension bridge built at the end of the 19th century above a portion enclosed by the Chéran valley, at the outlet (water gap) near Allèves, between the communes of Cusy and Gruffy.
- Pont Coppet – a stone bridge spanning the Fièr between the communes of Sales and Vallières. Built at the beginning of the 17th century on the former road between Chambéry and Geneva, it is one of the oldest bridges in the department.

=== Nature ===
- Marais des Mièges – covers an area of 21 hectares (52 acres) and is classified by the Natura 2000 and ZNIEFF.
- Étangs de Crosagny – an established avian breeding ground, this pond was important as a center for fish farming in the 14th century and is managed by the AEMC (the Association des Étangs et du Moulin de Crosagny, founded in 1992), and the intercommunal trade union of the Étangs de Crosagny. A functioning mill operated on the pond up until 1960, which for a long time provided the raw materials used in chairs. After the activity disappeared the pond, ceasing to be mowed, was filled in with an encroaching forest. The AEMC helps with the rehabilitation of the pond; volunteers have used boats to clear vegetation out of the pond, constructed an observatory, and developed a flora and fauna interpretive program which is attracting an increasing number of visitors. Since July 2004, the pond has become a tourist destination participating in a European program entitled Life Nature et Territoires en région Rhône Alpes, which subsidizes the cost of labor and maintenance.

=== Cultural and sporting events ===
- A triathlon is held in Rumilly, the eleventh of which took place in June 2010 with 400 participants
- A two-day renaissance fair takes place annually in Alby-sur-Chéran (eleventh annual took place in August 2010)

== Persons from the Albanais ==
- Father Michel Montmasson (1640–1688) – Catholic clerk and a Lazarist missionary
- Philibert Simond (1755–1794) – vicaire of Rumilly, deputy of Bas-Rhin to the National Convention, was guillotined in Paris on April 14, 1794
- Auguste de Juge (1797–1863) – judge and Savoyard poet
- Félix-Philibert Dupanloup (1802–1849) – born in Saint-Félix in 1802 and made a Bishop at Orléans in 1849, he was an avid preacher and wrote much on education, including Une nature supérieure de prêtre militant, alliant l'intégrité au talent, l'ardeur de la foi à l'éclat de l'esprit, la générosité du cœur à l'éclat de l'imagination
- Sébastien Madani – boxing champion with 25 professional fights (23 victories, 1 tie, 1 defeat), the Mediterranean champion of the World Boxing Council
