= William III of Geneva =

Count of Geneva from 1308 (1280–1320)

William III of Geneva (French: Guillaume III de Genève, 1280 - 1320) was the Count of Geneva from 1308 to 1320. He was the son of count Amadeus II of Geneva, and Agnès, daughter of John, Count of Chalon.

== Biography ==
William was the oldest son of Amadeus II of Geneva, and Agnès de Chalon, daughter of Jean I of Chalon of the House of Ivrea. He was born in the region of Savoy-Maurienne. He had two brothers: Hugues, a layman, and Amatus, the bishop of Toul from 1321 to 1330.^{:245} His sister Jeanne married Guichard VI of Albon, nicknamed LeGrand, lord of Beaujeuet, his other sister, Marie, married Jean II de Chalon, Count of Auxerre^{:245} and son of John I of Chalon-Arlay (1259–1316).

In 1291, his father signed a peace treaty with the Counts of Savoy, to strengthen the family status by an alliance between the two families, William was betrothed to Beatrice of Savoy, daughter of Amadeus V, Count of Savoy. The marriage contract was eventually annulled and William married Agnes, Beatrice's younger sister. The contract was signed at the castle of Saint-Georges-d'Espéranche of the counts of Savoy, on August 31, 1297. By this agreement, the Count of Savoy gave a dowry of 10,000 gold pounds, the castle of La Corbière to load tribute, the condition that the forces of the Count of Geneva prevent any attack, that the family of Geneva brings 4,000 gold pounds and the bridge in front of the castle to his son, and the castles of Rumilly in Albanais, Hauteville, Alby, and Charousse, as well as other pledges.

== Family and descendants ==
In 1297, William married Agnes of Savoy, daughter of Amadeus V, Count of Savoy, with issue:

- Amadeus III, born March 29, 1311, succeeded William as Count of Geneva, married Mahaut de Boulogne
- Marguerite, who married Aymar IV de Poitiers, the Count of Valentinois and Diois
- Yolande, who married Béraud, Count of Clermont
- William also had an illegitimate son with Emeraude de La Frasse, lady of Montjoie:
- Pierre, called "Bastard of Geneva". He married Catherine of Ternier, sister of Jean de Ternier, founding the cadet branch of Genève-Lullin and Genève-Boringe.

== Reign ==
=== William III takes power ===
His father Count Amadeus made his will at the castle of La Balme on September 24, 1306.^{:245} He designated him as his successor and specified that his brothers, Amédée and Hugues, would receive the Château de Varey, Château de Mornex, Chateau de Rumilly-sous-Cornillon, and the castle of Cornillon, for the vicedominus des Bornes, for the rights to the market of La Roche, and for the lands and rents he possessed in Vaud, all on condition that they dispose of these castles and rights only in favor of the heirs of the Count.^{:246} His father died on May 22, 1308, near the Chateau de Vuache.

It is unclear when Count William III took office. Pierre Duparc mentions the hypothesis of Jules Vuy, who believed that the new count took office at some time before the death of Amadeus. This observation was based on the analysis of a charter, not original, of 1308.^{:247} The historian Matthieu de la Corbière; however, indicates "by a transaction concluded on May 29, his eldest son Guillaume took over".

The succession raised certain concerns, especially between the young count and his mother, Agnes of Chalon. In 1306, during the writing of the will, William was a minor and therefore a regency by his mother had been anticipated. Two years later, the young count was of age to lead. A transaction is set up between the two parties, on May 29, 1308, by the executor, Jean I of Chalon-Arlay, brother of Agnes, and under the auspices of the Bishop of Geneva. Three years later, a new transaction was established in favor of the count by Jean de Chalon and reducing the share of inheritance of his mother, forcing her to renounce all claims on the county. In exchange, the count undertakes to defend the possessions of his mother. This act is guaranteed in February in particular by the Dauphin John II of Viennois, the son of the count Savoy Edward and Guichard VI de Beaujeu.

The reign of William III was most likely influenced by his wife from the house of Savoy. The new count committed to peace with the County of Savoy. At the peace treaty between the Count of Savoy and the Great Dauphine Béatrice of August 1308, William "vouches for its execution". On October 23, 1308, he signs with Count Amadeus V, a treaty of perpetual peace at the castle of Saint-Georges-d'Espéranche. The treaty was an opportunity for William to recognize that he holds "in fief of the Count of Savoy the castles and jurisdictions of Charousse, Alby, Hauteville, and La Corbière, as well as all that the lords of Grésy, Cessens, and Arnaud de Grandmont hold of him in Geneva". He also ratified past agreements, including the peace of Annemasse from 1287 or the arbitral award of 1293 passed with William, bishop of Lausanne, and Aimon of Quart. Finally, on January 21, 1312, the sons of the count of Savoy, Édouard and Aymon, signed an agreement committing the various parties to divide the barony of Faucigny, in case of death without heir of Lord Hugues. An event in April 1312 committed the signatories of the agreement to intervene. A vassal of Baron de Faucigny, Guillaume-Albi Lucinge, committed a murder, and the lords of Savoy and Geneva intervened by taking the castle Lucinges and destroy. The count, resumed his old alliance, with the Dauphin of Viennois, the bishops of Geneva and Lausanne. He also paid tribute to the Dauphin of Viennois, recognizing holding in fief his county and various castles of this lord, June 13, 1316.

=== Death and succession ===
On April 11, 1319, Count William wrote his will at the castle of Annecy, naming as heir his son Amédée. In the event that Amédée (his son) died childless, he made his brothers Hugues and Amédée his successors.^{270} In his will, he left a rente (annuity) of thirty livres a year to each of his brothers, a hundred to his mother, Agnès of Chalon, and to his wife Agnès of Savoy, her dowry and a life interest in the Vallée des Clefs and the castle of Charousse. This was supplemented by donations to the Church and its institutions. William died in 1320.

== See also ==
- Bishop of Geneva
- Counts of Geneva
- History of Geneva

Preceded by Amadeus II of Geneva	Count of Geneva; 1308–1320	Succeeded by Amadeus III of Geneva
