= Entrelacs =

Entrelacs may refer to:

- Entrelacs, Quebec, a municipality in Quebec, Canada
- Entrelacs, Savoie, a commune in Savoie, France
