= Château de Cessens-Vieux =

French castle

- Tour de César
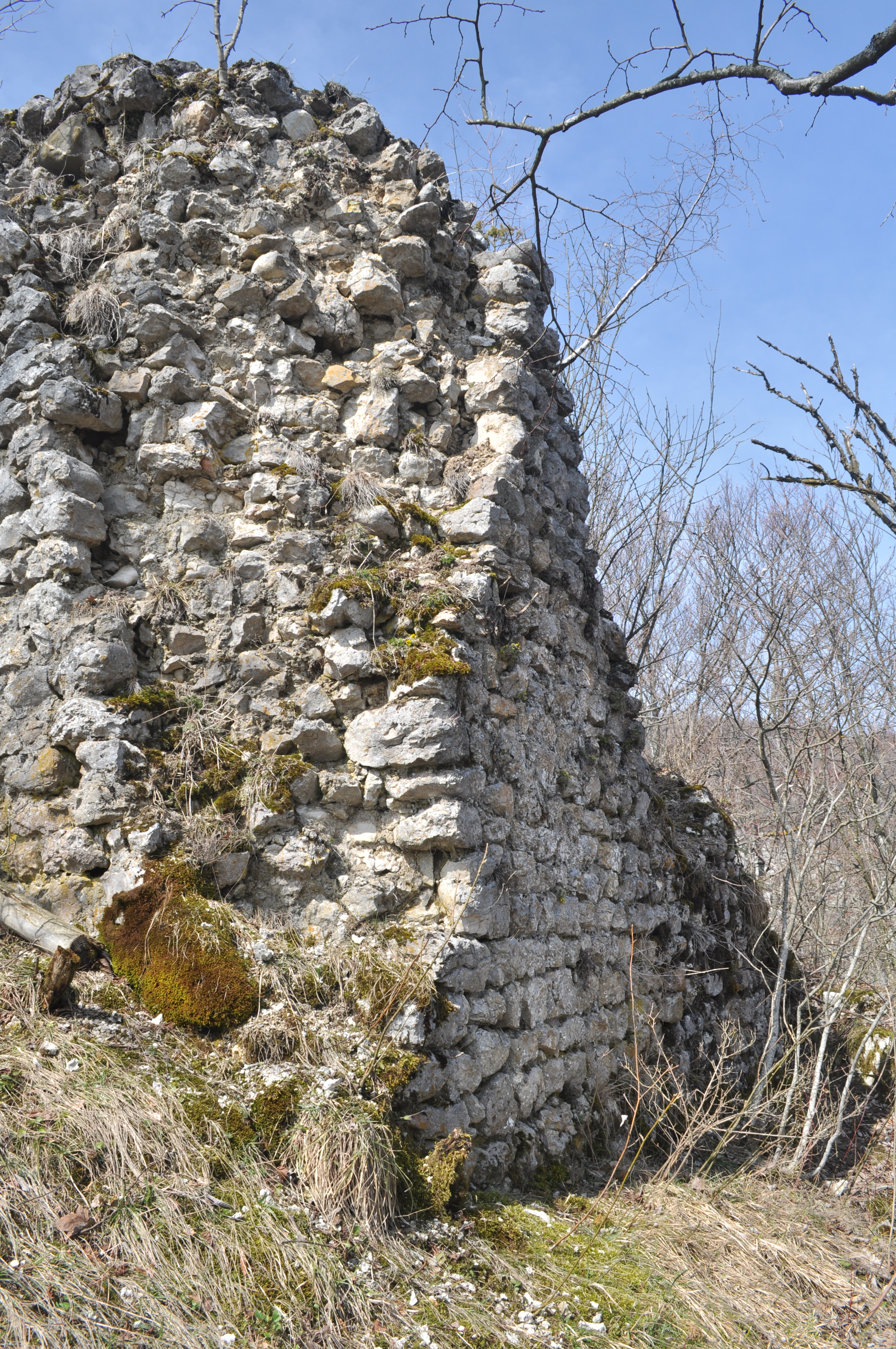
- Interactive map of Château de Cessens-Vieux
- Location: Country: France; Former provinces of the Duchy of Savoy: Genevois; Region: Auvergne-Rhône-Alpes; Department: Savoie; Municipality: Cessens
- Type: Castle
- Beginning date: 12th century
- Current destination: Ruined

The Château de Cessens-Vieux, also known as the Tower of Caesar, is a former fortified castle dating from the twelfth century. It served as the center of the seigneury of Cessens. The ruins of the structure stand in the commune of Cessens, in the Savoie department of the Auvergne-Rhône-Alpes region.

== Location ==
The Château de Cessens-Vieux is located in the commune of Cessens in the Savoie department of France. It stands on a small rise on the Cessens mountain near the Sapenay Pass, at an elevation of 830 meters and approximately 220 meters from Cessens-Neuf. The site controlled access to the pass.

== History ==
The castle is first recorded in a charter of 1121 in which Gauthier d’Aix granted the Abbey of Aulps a parcel of land located on the mountain where the castle stood (in monte castri Sexent). Matthieu de La Corbière includes it among the “Genevan” castra mentioned between the 11th and 12th centuries. It appears again in a document dated 1 February 1125, signed by Rodolphe de Faucigny, lord of Faucigny, indicating that the site then belonged to the Faucigny family.

From 1213 to 1219, the castle was held by Pierre de Cessens, bishop of Geneva. (Note: According to Georges Chapier, it was Pierre de Cessens who had the castle of the Île (Castrum Insule) in Geneva and that of Marval in Saint-Jean-de-Gonville built, although this is usually attributed to Aymon de Grandson; moreover, the latter is said to have begun his ministry in 1215, which conflicts with the date 1219.)

It later came under the control of the Counts of Geneva. Amadeus V of Savoy seized it in 1287 from Amadeus III of Geneva but returned it following a peace treaty signed at Annemasse.

The site is mentioned in a 1300 recognition issued by Pierre and Mermet de Grésy. In 1316, William III of Geneva granted it in fief to Rodolphe de Grésy. At that time, the two castles, Cessens-Vieux and Cessens-Neuf, were held by the Grésy family; the former remained under the authority of the Counts of Geneva, while the latter was the subject of disputes with the House of Savoy. In 1309, Alise de Grésy, mother of Pierre de Grésy, resided there.

In 1401, the County of Geneva was purchased by Count Amadeus VIII of Savoy. The seigneury of Cessens and its mandement were not included in the transfer and reverted to the heirs of the House of Geneva. In 1409, Matilda of Savoy inherited the rights of her aunt, Blanche of Geneva, becoming the last heir of the family. The Count of Savoy sought to recover these remaining rights and proposed to purchase them. Her guardian, Louis of Savoy-Achaea, accepted the offer. The contract between Mathilde and the duke was concluded on 11 January 1417.

Amadeus VIII of Savoy, who became duke in 1416, relinquished his rights on 22 December 1422 in favor of Gabriel d’Hauteville. In 1432, the property was granted in fief to Manfred of Saluzzo, marquis of Saluzzo.

On 28 February 1563, Jacques of Savoy-Nemours sold the castles of Cessens and Grésy for 4,000 gold écus to Louis Oddinet, baron of Montfort. The castles were repurchased by Jacques of Savoy-Nemours in 1572 for the same amount. In 1575, they were sold again, this time for 6,000 écus, to Guillaume de Portes, lord of Châtel, president of the Parliament of Dauphiné, and counselor to the king of France, who undertook repairs. The property later passed to his son, Antoine de Portes.

In 1614, the castle was reported to be in poor condition. In 1630, Madame de Gellaz, lady of Cessens and born de Rusinens, is mentioned as its holder. In 1672, following the death of Jeanne de Gellaz, baroness of Bagnols, the property passed to her sister, Madame de La Motte. On 28 November 1677, she exchanged the land of Cessens for the castle and lands of Saint-Hilaire, owned by Claude Carron, attorney at the Senate of Savoy and later councillor of state and comptroller general of finances. Carron was made a baron in 1679 and a count of Grésy in 1682. The castle subsequently passed to his descendants—Enard Carron, François Vincent Carron, and Claude Marie Carron, a Sardinian officer. Claude Marie Carron emigrated in 1792 during the entry of General Montesquiou’s revolutionary troops into Savoy. The castle was then declared national property and sold to the Polingui family before later passing to the Mouxy family.

== Description ==
The castle consisted of an enclosure, of which few traces remain, with access located on the eastern side. Within the enclosure stood a square residential tower flanked by a circular tower.

The quadrangular Romanesque keep measures approximately 6.45 × 6.60 metres, with walls 1.40 metres thick. Its small size is comparable to the Bergfrieden commonly found in imperial territories and southern France. Constructed of small stonework, it was adjoined on the east by a circular tower measuring 7 metres in diameter, with walls 2.40 metres thick and built of fine stonework. The circular tower likely dates from the fourteenth century, possibly after the siege and occupation of Cessens-Neuf in October 1320. It was struck by lightning in 1862 and has largely collapsed.

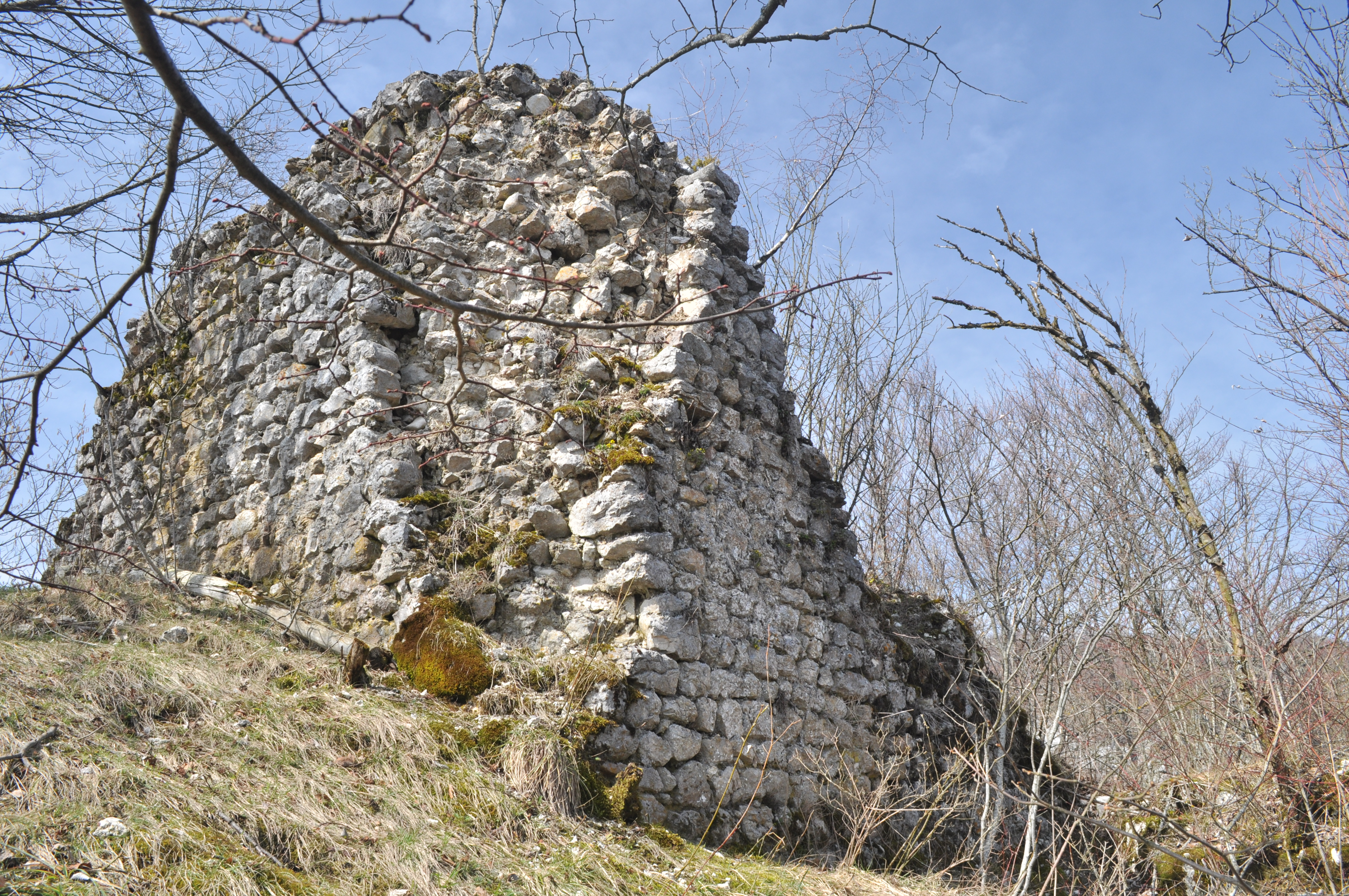
The square Romanesque tower.

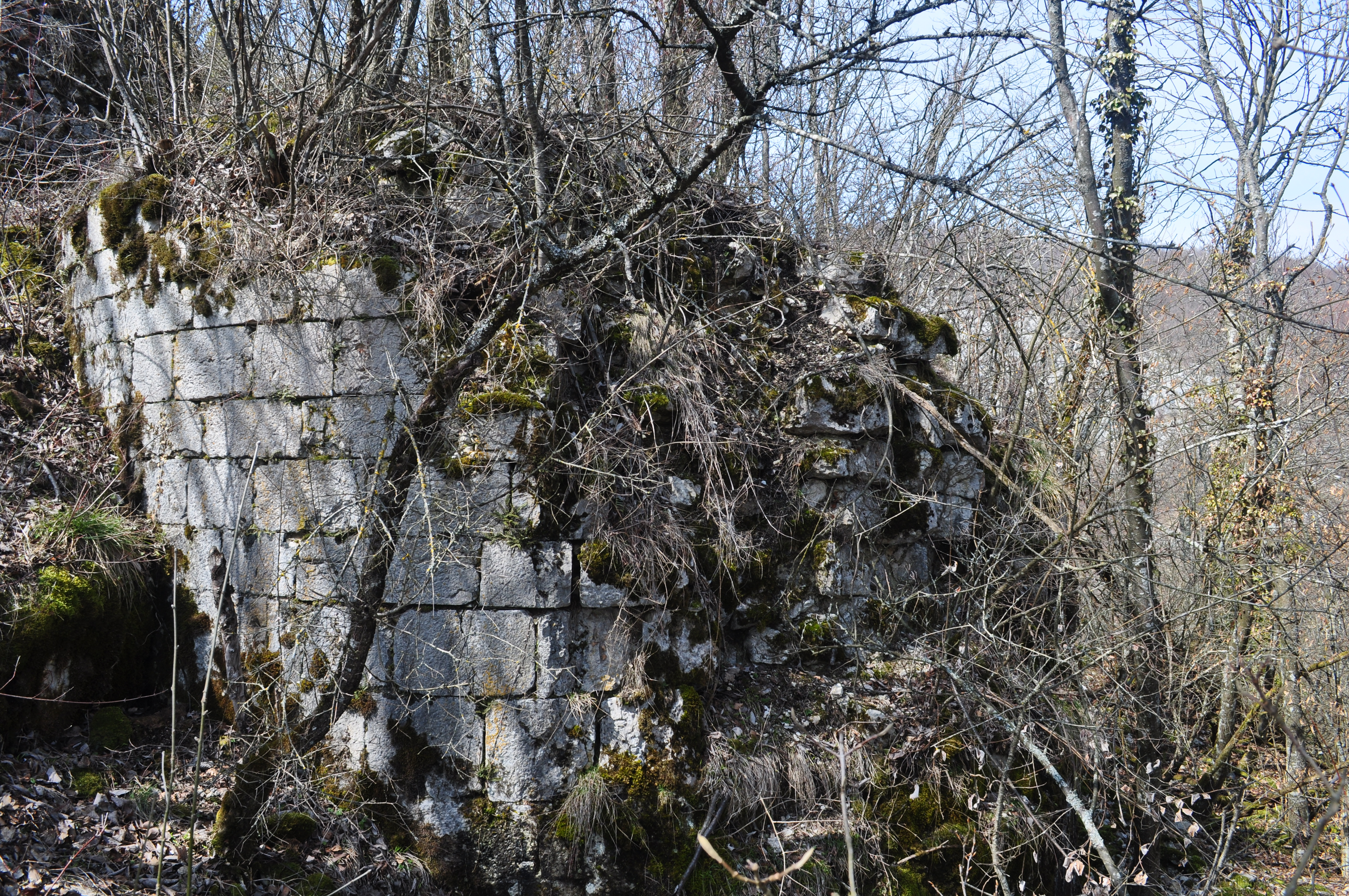
The 14th-century round tower.

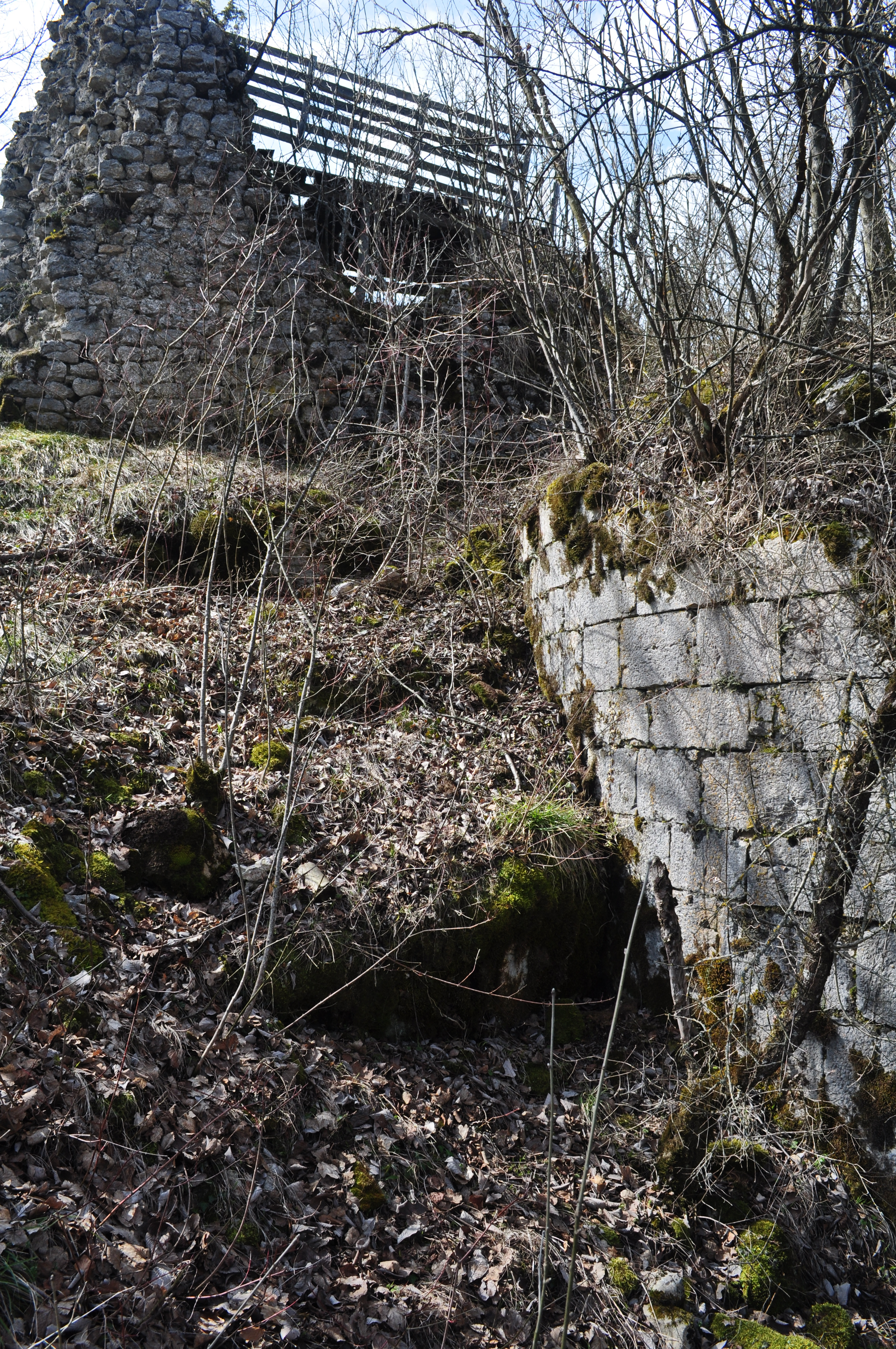
The round tower in the foreground and the square tower in the background.

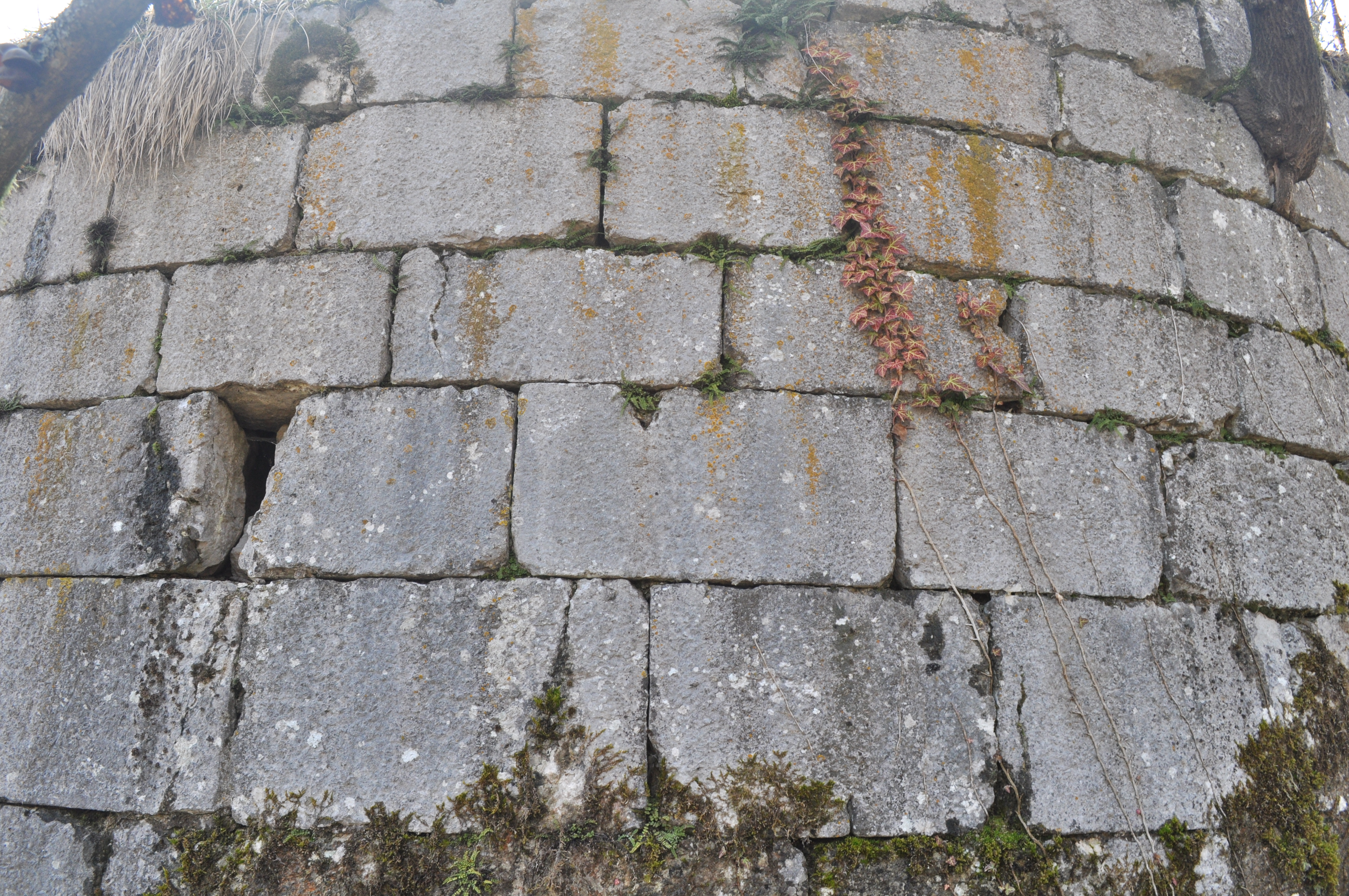
A detail of the round tower's masonry.

== Châtellenie of Cessens and Grésy ==
The castle of Cessens-le-Vieux served as the seat of the châtellenie, or mandement (mandamentum), of Cessens and Grésy, consolidating the former neighboring châtellenie. It functioned as a comital châtellenie under the authority of the Count of Geneva. Within the county of Geneva, the comital castellan was appointed by the count and exercised various administrative and judicial powers. Following the incorporation into the County of Savoy in 1401, the castellan became an officer appointed for a fixed term, revocable and removable, responsible for managing the châtellenie, collecting fiscal revenues, and maintaining the castle.

Châtelains of Cessens and Grésy, 14th to 17th century
Savoyard administration
- 1375–1381: Rolet de de Beaufort
- 1437–1466: Nicod de Beaufort
- 1474–1476: François de La Balme, vice-châtelain of Cessens

Administration of the apanage of Genevois (1502–1659)

- 1515–1522: Noble Georges Girard
- before 1531: Noble Pierre Roland
- 1524–1530: Noble Louis André
- 1531–1532: Noble Aymon Balli, who subrogated the office to Master Pierre Chasey from 1531 to 1534
- 1533–1534: Noble Claude Bourguignon
- 1535–1537: Noble Bartholomé Joris
- 1539–1541: Noble Aymé de L'Alée or Lalée
- 1541–1544: Noble Bartholomé Joris
- 1544: Noble André Alliod
- 1544–1547: Noble Philippe Megex
  - 1546: Noble Pierre Mermier
- 1547–1550: Noble André Alliod
- 1550–1553: Noble Humbert de Bongain, who subrogated the office to Master (Note: Master is a designation associated with “attorneys, notaries, practitioners, and commissioners.”) Jean Berlioz
- 1553–1556: Noble François Croyson, who subrogated the office to Master Benoît Larderat
- 1555–1559: Master Humbert Roland
- 1559–1565: Master Claude Chappuis
  - 1562: Master Barthélémy Ribitel
- 1572–1577: Honorable (Note: Honorable is a designation associated with successful artisans.) Jacques Picq, called Cramoisy
- 1577–1580: Masters Claude Bally, Master Michel Berthet, and Barthélémy Ribitel

Mandement alienated to the Portes family (1575–1659)

Known châtelains:

- before 1621: Master Barthélémy Bally
- 1616–1622: Master Antoine II Ribitel
- 1628–1634: Master Antoine II Ribitel

== See also ==
- Medieval fortification

== Bibliography ==
- Brocard, Michèle (1995). Les châteaux de Savoie [The castles of Savoy]. Sites et Villages (in French). Yens-sur-Morges: Éditions Cabédita. pp. 74–75. ISBN 978-2-88295-142-7.
- Chapier, Georges (1961). Châteaux savoyards : Faucigny et Chablais [Savoyard castles: Faucigny and Chablais] (in French). Vol. 5. Grenoble: Éditions Revue Les Alpes.
- Payraud, Nicolas (2009). "Châteaux, espace et société en Dauphiné et en Savoie du milieu du XIIIe siècle à la fin du XVe siècle" [Castles, space, and society in Dauphiné and Savoie from the mid-13th century to the end of the 15th century] (PDF). HAL - Archives Ouvertes (in French).
