= Vallières-sur-Fier =

- Commune
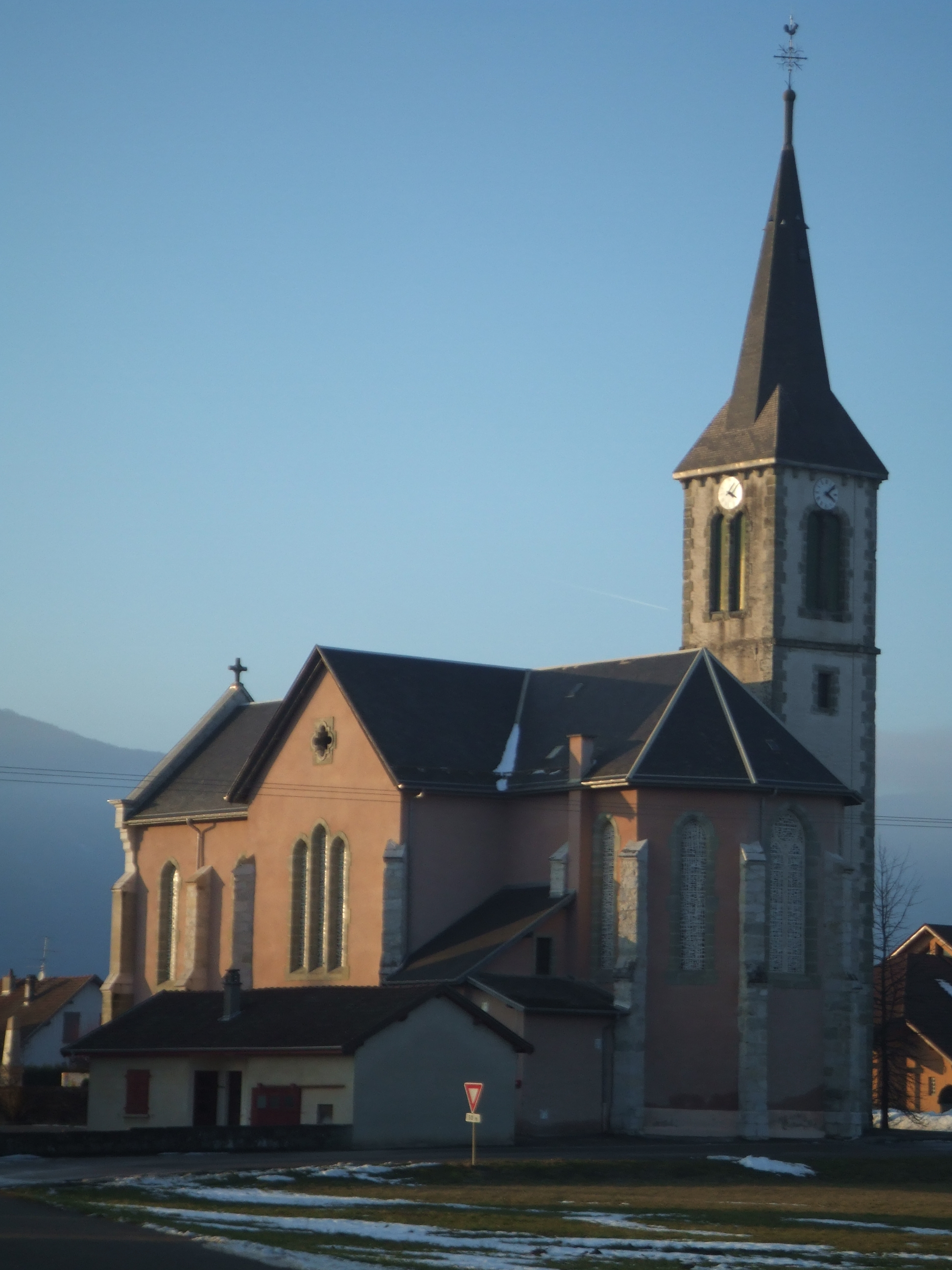
- Church
- Location of Vallières-sur-Fier
- Location within France Location within Auvergne-Rhône-Alpes
- Coordinates: 45°54′3″N 5°56′13″E
- Country: France
- Region: Auvergne-Rhône-Alpes
- Department: Haute-Savoie
- Arrondissement: Annecy
- Canton: Rumilly
- Intercommunality: Rumilly Terre de Savoie

Government
  - Mayor (2020–2026): François Ravoire
- Area^{1}: 19.14 km^{2} (7.39 sq mi)
- Highest elevation: 1,000 m (3,300 ft)
- Lowest elevation: 299 m (981 ft)
- Population (2023): 2,860
  - Density: 149/km^{2} (387/sq mi)
- Time zone: UTC+01:00 (CET)
  - Summer (DST): UTC+02:00 (CEST)
- INSEE/Postal code: 74289 /74150
- ^{1} French Land Register data, which excludes lakes, ponds, glaciers > 1 km^{2} (0.386 sq mi or 247 acres) and river estuaries.

Vallières-sur-Fier (French pronunciation: [valjɛʁ syʁ fjɛʁ], literally Vallières on Fier) is a commune in the Haute-Savoie department in the Auvergne-Rhône-Alpes region in south-eastern France. The municipality was established on 1 January 2019 and consist of the communes of Vallières and Val-de-Fier.

== Population ==
Population data refer to the area corresponding with the commune as of January 2025.

Historical population
Year	Pop.	±% p.a.
1968	939	—
1975	1,014	+1.10%
1982	1,217	+2.64%
1990	1,363	+1.43%
1999	1,666	+2.26%
2007	1,868	+1.44%
2012	2,142	+2.78%
2017	2,503	+3.16%
2023	2,860	+2.25%
Source: INSEE
