= Amadeus II of Geneva =

Count of Geneva (died 1308)

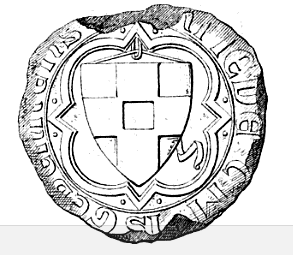
Seal of Amadeus II of Geneva

This coat of arms was used by Amadeus II as early as 1288. Its blazon is: Checquy of nine panes, or and azure (d'or à quatre points équipollés d'azur).

Amadeus II (died 22 May 1308) was the Count of Geneva, which included the Genevois, but not the city of Geneva, from 1280 to 1308. He was the second son of Count Rudolf and succeeded his heirless brother Aymon II.

== Alliance and war (1282–83) ==
In June 1282 at Versoix, Amadeus and Béatrice “la Grande Dauphine”, the dowager Countess of Albon and regent for her son John I, came to an agreement whereby all the places that Amadeus' father and grandfather, William II, had been forced to cede to Peter “the Little Charlemagne” in 1250 and 1260—the so-called gagerie (Note: Places and rights that formed the gagerie included the castles of Ballaison, Charousse, Geneva, Les Clées and Rue; the homage owed by the lords of Gruyère, Langin, Oron and Vufflens; and the jurisdictions the Count of Geneva had in the Chablais, the Faucigny and the Pays de Vaud, all territories within the orbit of Savoy.)—would be returned to Geneva. The gagerie was originally to be held by Peter and his heirs until the Count of Geneva paid a war indemnity of 20,000 marks, later reduced to 10,000. Béatrice was Peter's only daughter and heir, and the widow of Guigues VII of Albon. In return for these lands, Amadeus granted to Béatrice suzerainty over certain lordships and agreed to take any allods within the returned gagerie as fiefs of her and her heirs, the Counts of Albon, instead. The treaty also created a mutual defensive alliance and cooperation in an offensive against "those detaining and possessing the properties and men belonging to the above-mentioned gagerie", that is, men of the house of Savoy, Béatrice's relatives. The conference of Versoix was under the presidency of Amadeus' uncle, the Bishop of Geneva, who promised to help both parties so far as it did not threaten the rights of his diocese. The privilege of arbitrating disputes between Amadeus and Béatrice fell to Humbert I of La Tour-du-Pin, who was Béatrice's son-in-law as the husband of her daughter Anne.

War with Savoy immediately broke out following the alliance between Amadeus and the Dauphine. By 1 November 1282 the Savoyards had attacked Avalon in the Dauphiné and Bellecombe in the Genevois. The castle of La Buissière in the Dauphiné was captured by Louis I of Vaud, who then invaded the Grésivaudan, while his brother Amadeus, marching from the Bresse, assaulted Moirans. These attacks caused the bishop to withdraw from the alliance and make peace with Philip I, Count of Savoy, the brothers' uncle. In February 1283 the Genevois and men form the Faucigny, enemies (inimicos) of Savoy, invaded the Savoyard castellany of Châtelard-en-Bauges and burned the village. In the Genevan citadel of Bourg-du-Four, agents of Count Philip fomented unrest in the city against both Amadeus II and the bishop. At this point in the spring of 1283 the emperor-elect Rudolf of Habsburg intervened against Savoy. Rudolf first attacked Morat and, failing in this, Payerne, where his assault was repulsed and the Louis of Vaud came to the city's defence. He then ordered the citizens of Fribourg to join the ‘imperial’ host and wrote to Amadeus II ordering him to invade Savoy an open up a “second front”. Although Amadeus received an offer of one hundred knights if he needed assistance, he does not appear to have actually opened up a “second front”, perhaps understanding better than the emperor the difficulty such an effort would face.

Amadeus died 22 May 1308 apud lu Bacho, and was buried the next day (23 May) at Montagny.

== Marriage and issue ==
Amadeus married Agnes, daughter of John, Count of Chalon, and his second wife, Laurette de Commercy, by a marriage contract drawn up 1 June 1285. They had three sons and two daughters who were still living at his death:

- William III, his successor
- Amadeus, who became Bishop of Toul
- Hugh, who continued his father's feuding with the house of Savoy well into the reign of Amadeus VI of Savoy
- Jeanne (died 23 February 1303), who married Guichard VI de Beaujeu (1300)
- Marie, who is mentioned in a document of 1306

== Bibliography ==
- Cox, Eugene L. The Eagles of Savoy: The House of Savoy in Thirteenth-Century Europe. Princeton, New Jersey: Princeton University Press, 1974.
- Duparc, Pierre. Le comté de Genève: IX^{e}–XV^{e} siècle. Mémoires et documents publiés par la Société d'histoire et d'archéologie de Genève, 39. Geneva: Julien, 1978.
- Poole, Reginald S. A Descriptive Catalogue of the Swiss Coins in the South Kensington Museum Bequeathed by the Reverend Chauncy Hare Townshend. Elbiron Classics, 2006.

Preceded by Aymon II of Geneva	Count of Geneva; 1280–1308	Succeeded by William III of Geneva
