= Vallières, Haute-Savoie =

Vallières Valîre (Savoyard)
- Part of Vallières-sur-Fier
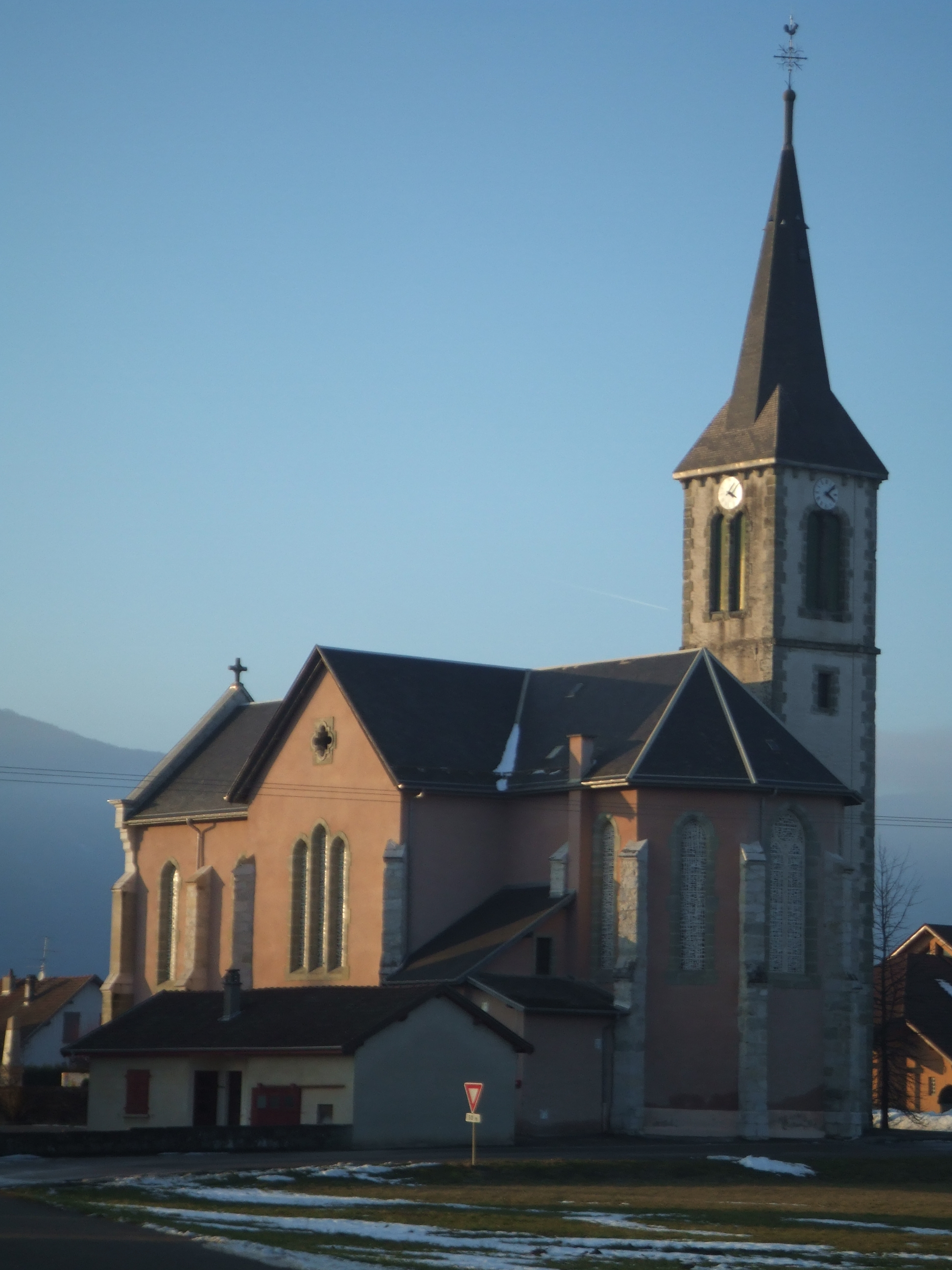
- Church

- Coat of arms
- Location of Vallières
- Location within France Location within Auvergne-Rhône-Alpes
- Coordinates: 45°54′03″N 5°56′13″E
- Country: France
- Region: Auvergne-Rhône-Alpes
- Department: Haute-Savoie
- Arrondissement: Annecy
- Canton: Rumilly
- Commune: Vallières-sur-Fier
- Area^{1}: 9.03 km^{2} (3.49 sq mi)
- Highest elevation: 510 m (1,670 ft)
- Lowest elevation: 299 m (981 ft)
- Population (2016): 1,807
  - Density: 200/km^{2} (518/sq mi)
- Time zone: UTC+01:00 (CET)
  - Summer (DST): UTC+02:00 (CEST)
- Postal code: 74150
- ^{1} French Land Register data, which excludes lakes, ponds, glaciers > 1 km^{2} (0.386 sq mi or 247 acres) and river estuaries.

Vallières (French pronunciation: [valjɛʁ]; Savoyard: Valîre) is a former commune in the Haute-Savoie department in the Auvergne-Rhône-Alpes region in south-eastern France. On 1 January 2019, it was merged into the new commune Vallières-sur-Fier.

== Geography ==
The Fier forms the commune's southern border.

== See also ==
- Communes of the Haute-Savoie department
