= Saint-Girod =

Saint-Girod San-Zhrou (Savoyard)
- Part of Entrelacs
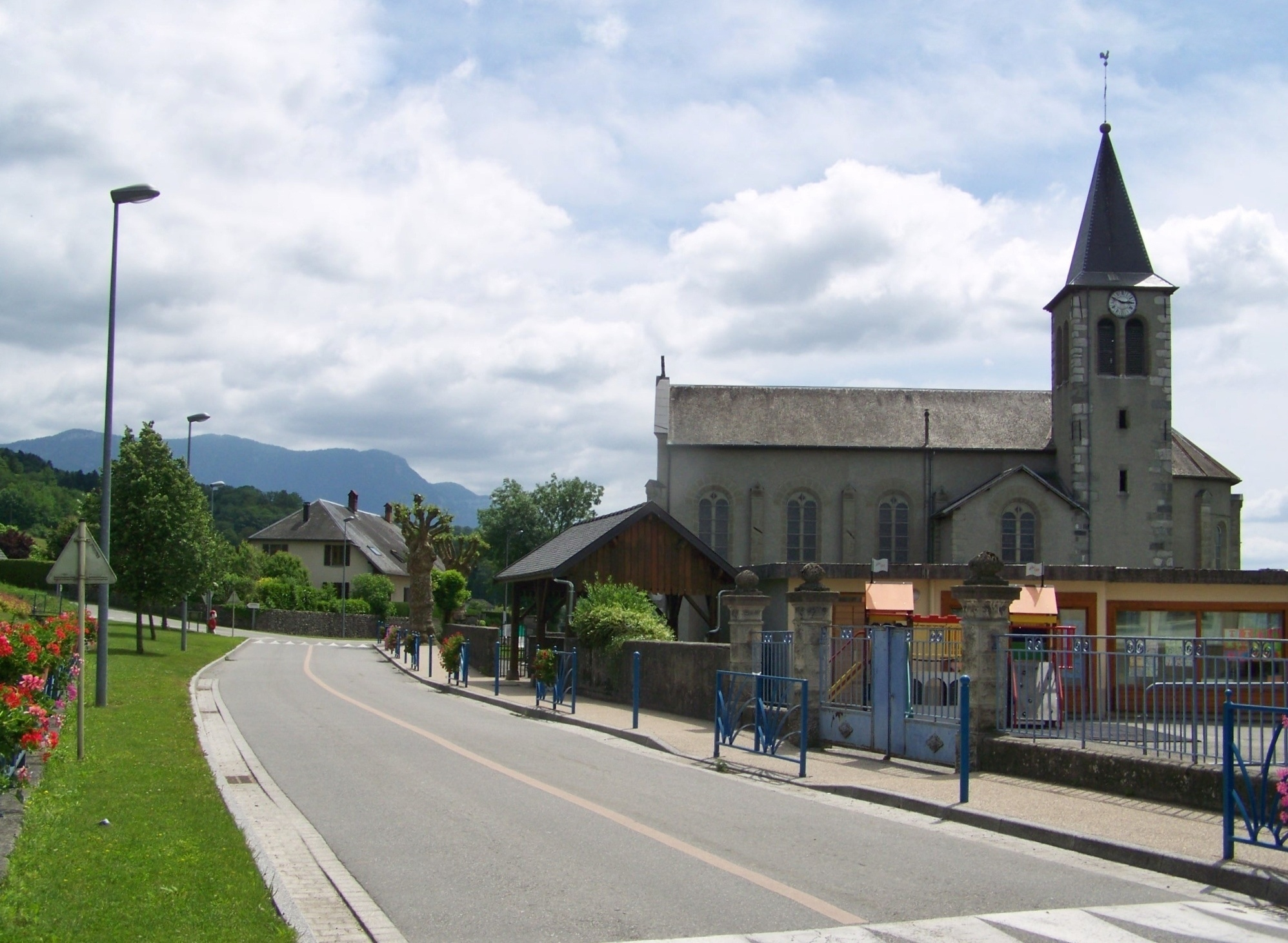
- Commune of Saint-Girod: village center and its church
- Location of Saint-Girod
- Location within France Location within Auvergne-Rhône-Alpes
- Coordinates: 45°46′51″N 5°58′05″E
- Country: France
- Region: Auvergne-Rhône-Alpes
- Department: Savoie
- Arrondissement: Chambéry
- Canton: Aix-les-Bains-1
- Commune: Entrelacs
- Area^{1}: 6.35 km^{2} (2.45 sq mi)
- Highest elevation: 537 m (1,762 ft)
- Lowest elevation: 334 m (1,096 ft)
- Population (2022): 636
  - Density: 100/km^{2} (259/sq mi)
- Time zone: UTC+01:00 (CET)
  - Summer (DST): UTC+02:00 (CEST)
- Postal code: 73410
- ^{1} French Land Register data, which excludes lakes, ponds, glaciers > 1 km^{2} (0.386 sq mi or 247 acres) and river estuaries.

Saint-Girod (French pronunciation: [sɛ̃ ʒiʁo]; Savoyard: San-Zhrou) is a former commune in the Savoie department in the Auvergne-Rhône-Alpes region in south-eastern France. On 1 January 2016, it was merged into the new commune of Entrelacs.

== See also ==
- Communes of the Savoie department
