= Entrelacs, Savoie =

Entrelacs
- Commune
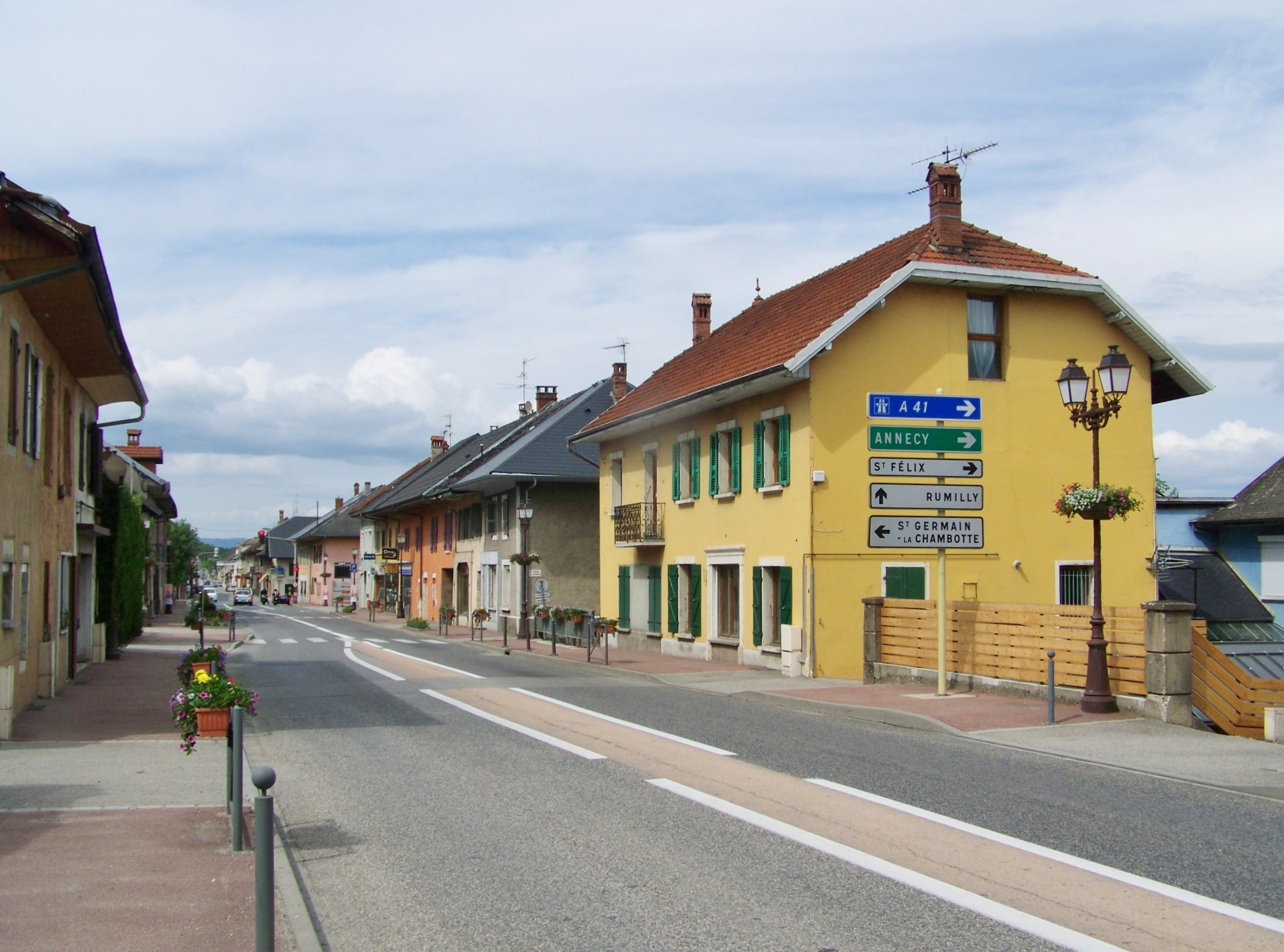
- A view within Albens
- Location of Entrelacs
- Location within France Location within Auvergne-Rhône-Alpes
- Coordinates: 45°47′10″N 5°56′42″E
- Country: France
- Region: Auvergne-Rhône-Alpes
- Department: Savoie
- Arrondissement: Chambéry
- Canton: Aix-les-Bains-1
- Intercommunality: CA Grand Lac

Government
  - Mayor (2020–2026): Jean François Braissand
- Area^{1}: 51.90 km^{2} (20.04 sq mi)
- Population (2023): 6,461
  - Density: 124.5/km^{2} (322.4/sq mi)
- Time zone: UTC+01:00 (CET)
  - Summer (DST): UTC+02:00 (CEST)
- INSEE/Postal code: 73010 /73410
- ^{1} French Land Register data, which excludes lakes, ponds, glaciers > 1 km^{2} (0.386 sq mi or 247 acres) and river estuaries.

Entrelacs (French pronunciation: [ɑ̃tʁəlak]) is a commune in the Savoie department of southeastern France. The municipality was established on 1 January 2016 and consists of the former communes of Albens, Cessens, Épersy, Mognard, Saint-Germain-la-Chambotte and Saint-Girod.

== Geography ==
=== Climate ===
Entrelacs has an oceanic climate (Köppen climate classification Cfb). The average annual temperature in Entrelacs is 11.0 °C (51.8 °F). The average annual rainfall is 1,280.1 mm (50.40 in) with October as the wettest month. The temperatures are highest on average in July, at around 20.4 °C (68.7 °F), and lowest in January, at around 1.8 °C (35.2 °F). The highest temperature ever recorded in Entrelacs was 39.5 °C (103.1 °F) on 13 August 2003; the coldest temperature ever recorded was −20.0 °C (−4.0 °F) on 7 January 1985.

Climate data for Entrelacs (Mognard, altitude 340m, 1991–2020 normals, extremes 1984–2020)
| Month | Jan | Feb | Mar | Apr | May | Jun | Jul | Aug | Sep | Oct | Nov | Dec | Year |
|---|---|---|---|---|---|---|---|---|---|---|---|---|---|
| Record high °C (°F) | 17.1 (62.8) | 20.1 (68.2) | 25.0 (77.0) | 29.5 (85.1) | 33.1 (91.6) | 37.7 (99.9) | 38.4 (101.1) | 39.5 (103.1) | 32.4 (90.3) | 27.0 (80.6) | 21.6 (70.9) | 21.0 (69.8) | 39.5 (103.1) |
| Mean daily maximum °C (°F) | 5.6 (42.1) | 8.0 (46.4) | 13.2 (55.8) | 17.0 (62.6) | 21.2 (70.2) | 25.1 (77.2) | 27.5 (81.5) | 27.0 (80.6) | 22.2 (72.0) | 16.8 (62.2) | 10.1 (50.2) | 6.0 (42.8) | 16.6 (61.9) |
| Daily mean °C (°F) | 1.8 (35.2) | 3.1 (37.6) | 7.0 (44.6) | 10.5 (50.9) | 14.7 (58.5) | 18.5 (65.3) | 20.4 (68.7) | 20.0 (68.0) | 15.9 (60.6) | 11.6 (52.9) | 5.9 (42.6) | 2.4 (36.3) | 11.0 (51.8) |
| Mean daily minimum °C (°F) | −2.0 (28.4) | −1.8 (28.8) | 0.8 (33.4) | 3.9 (39.0) | 8.3 (46.9) | 11.9 (53.4) | 13.2 (55.8) | 13.0 (55.4) | 9.6 (49.3) | 6.4 (43.5) | 1.8 (35.2) | −1.2 (29.8) | 5.3 (41.5) |
| Record low °C (°F) | −20.0 (−4.0) | −16.9 (1.6) | −13.0 (8.6) | −7.0 (19.4) | −2.5 (27.5) | 1.1 (34.0) | 4.7 (40.5) | 3.0 (37.4) | −0.5 (31.1) | −7.0 (19.4) | −14.0 (6.8) | −15.4 (4.3) | −20.0 (−4.0) |
| Average precipitation mm (inches) | 100.2 (3.94) | 83.5 (3.29) | 93.9 (3.70) | 96.6 (3.80) | 108.5 (4.27) | 107.6 (4.24) | 98.3 (3.87) | 112.9 (4.44) | 113.1 (4.45) | 125.1 (4.93) | 117.6 (4.63) | 122.8 (4.83) | 1,280.1 (50.40) |
| Average precipitation days (≥ 1.0 mm) | 10.5 | 8.9 | 9.7 | 9.8 | 11.3 | 10.4 | 8.8 | 9.1 | 8.9 | 11.0 | 11.0 | 11.4 | 120.8 |
Source: Météo-France

== Population ==
Population data refer to the area corresponding with the commune as of January 2025.

Historical population
| Year | Pop. | ±% p.a. |
|---|---|---|
| 1968 | 2,849 | — |
| 1975 | 2,859 | +0.05% |
| 1982 | 3,404 | +2.52% |
| 1990 | 3,964 | +1.92% |
| 1999 | 4,378 | +1.11% |
| 2007 | 5,200 | +2.17% |
| 2012 | 5,744 | +2.01% |
| 2017 | 6,268 | +1.76% |
| 2023 | 6,461 | +0.51% |
Source: INSEE

== See also ==
- Communes of the Savoie department
