= Val-de-Fier =

Val-de-Fier Valo d Fyér (Savoyard)
- Part of Vallières-sur-Fier
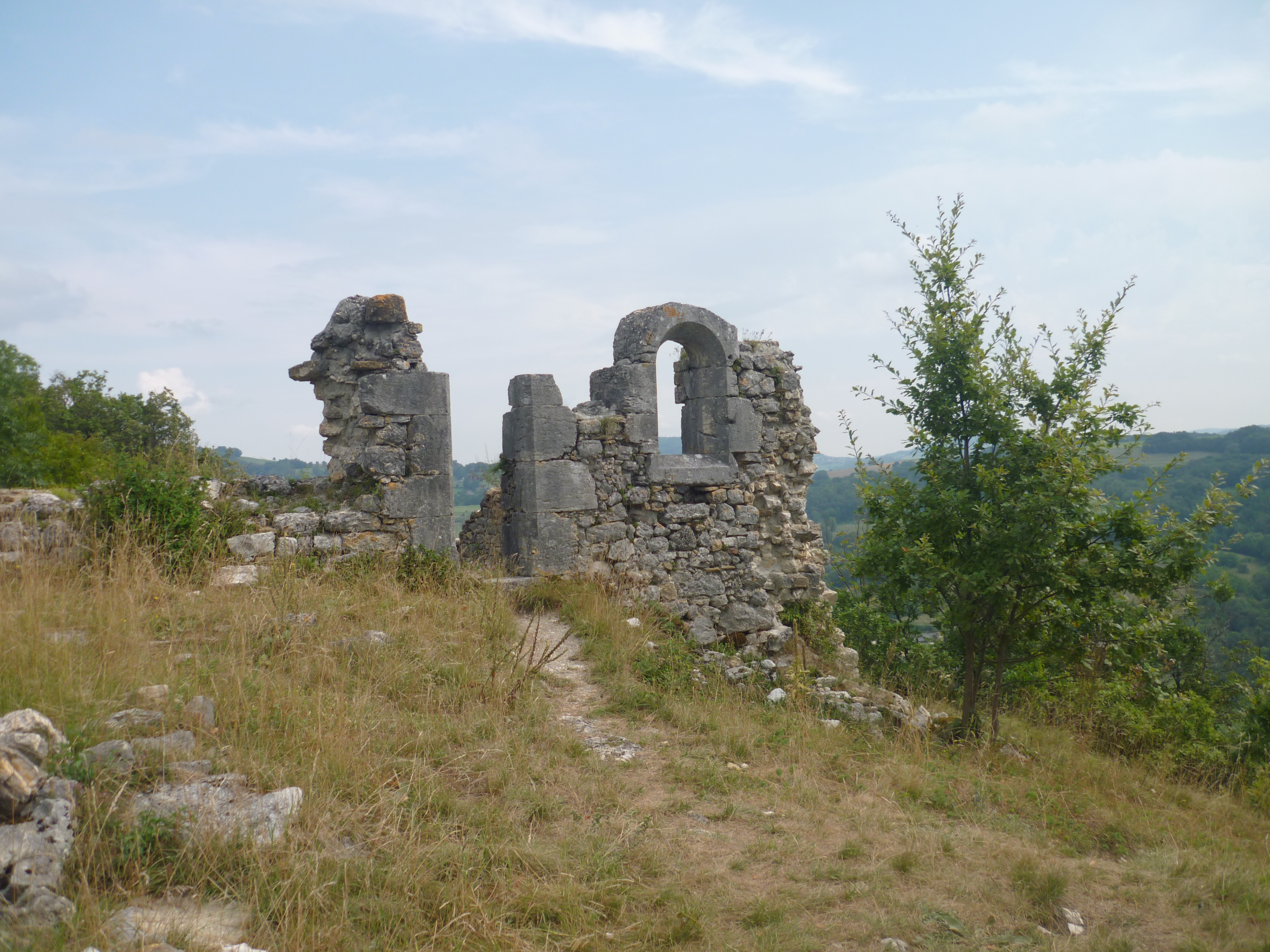
- The ruins of the old church of Saint-André, inVal de Fier
- Location of Val-de-Fier
- Location within France Location within Auvergne-Rhône-Alpes
- Coordinates: 45°55′13″N 5°54′46″E
- Country: France
- Region: Auvergne-Rhône-Alpes
- Department: Haute-Savoie
- Arrondissement: Annecy
- Canton: Rumilly
- Commune: Vallières-sur-Fier
- Area^{1}: 10.11 km^{2} (3.90 sq mi)
- Highest elevation: 1,000 m (3,300 ft)
- Lowest elevation: 292 m (958 ft)
- Population (2016): 666
  - Density: 65.9/km^{2} (171/sq mi)
- Time zone: UTC+01:00 (CET)
  - Summer (DST): UTC+02:00 (CEST)
- Postal code: 74150
- ^{1} French Land Register data, which excludes lakes, ponds, glaciers > 1 km^{2} (0.386 sq mi or 247 acres) and river estuaries.

Val-de-Fier (French pronunciation: [val də fjɛʁ], literally Vale of Fier; Savoyard: Valo d Fyér) is a former commune in the Haute-Savoie department in the Auvergne-Rhône-Alpes region in south-eastern France. On 1 January 2019, it was merged into the new commune Vallières-sur-Fier. Its nearest town is Rumilly.

== Geography ==
The Fier forms most of the commune's south-western border.

== History ==
Val-de-Fier was formed in 1973 from two different villages : Sion and Saint-André.

== Population ==
- 1962 : 238 inhabitants.
- 1968 : 266 inhabitants.
- 1975 : 256 inhabitants.
- 1982 : 296 inhabitants.
- 1990 : 317 inhabitants.
- 1999 : 389 inhabitants.
- 2006 : 513 inhabitants.

== Mayors ==
- Before 1991: Louis Dumont
- 1991 - 2001: Paul Terrier
- Since 2001: Maurice Popp

== See also ==
- Communes of the Haute-Savoie department
