= Vicaire =

Vicaire is a surname. Notable people with the surname include:

- Georges Vicaire (1853–1921), French bibliophile
- Louis Gabriel Charles Vicaire (1848–1900), French poet
