= Saint-Germain-la-Chambotte =

Saint-Germain-la-Chambotte San-Zharmin (Savoyard)
- Part of Entrelacs
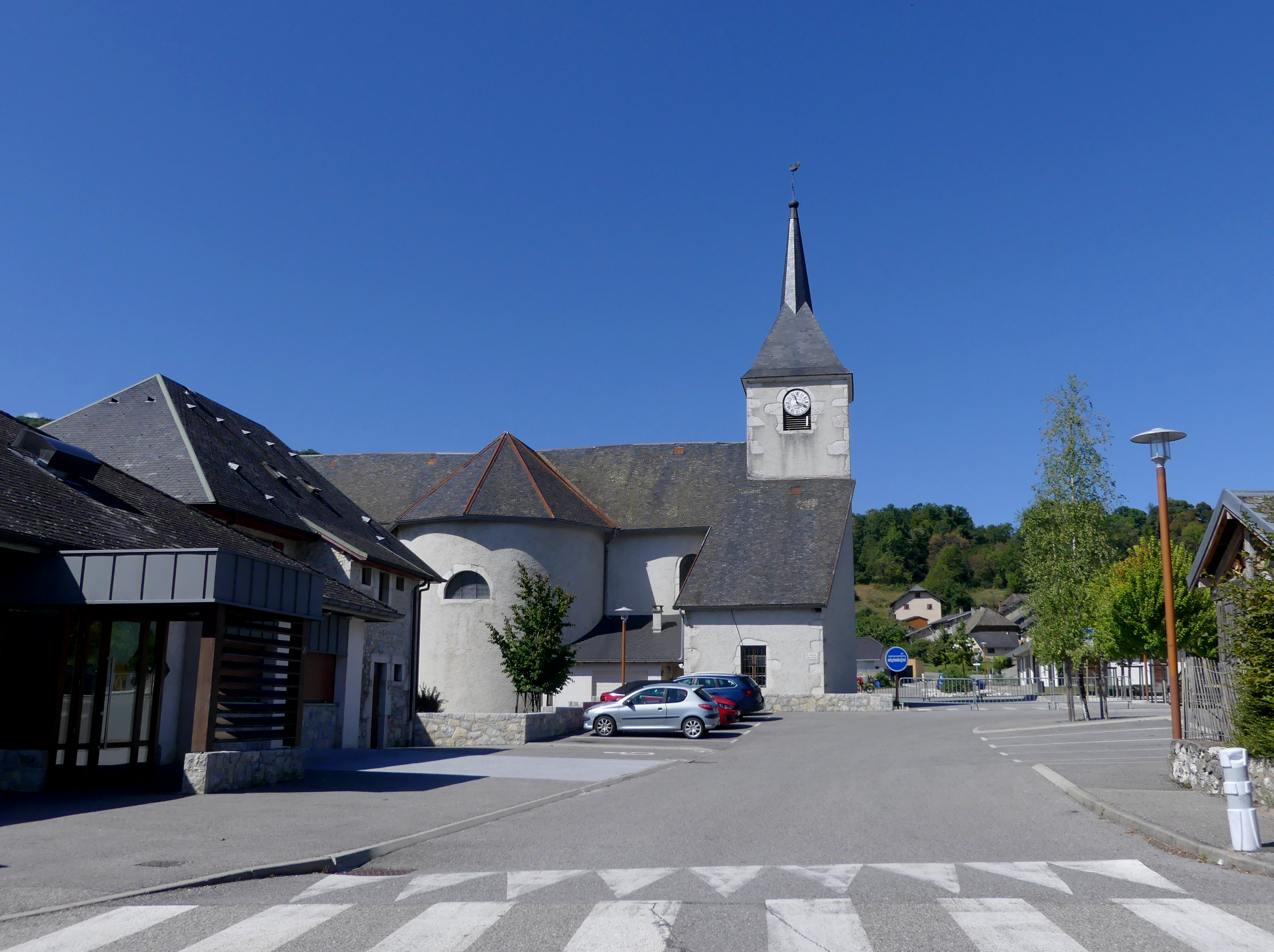
- Location of Saint-Germain-la-Chambotte
- Location within France Location within Auvergne-Rhône-Alpes
- Coordinates: 45°46′45″N 5°53′33″E
- Country: France
- Region: Auvergne-Rhône-Alpes
- Department: Savoie
- Arrondissement: Chambéry
- Canton: Aix-les-Bains-1
- Commune: Entrelacs
- Area^{1}: 9.64 km^{2} (3.72 sq mi)
- Highest elevation: 847 m (2,779 ft)
- Lowest elevation: 229 m (751 ft)
- Population (2022): 515
  - Density: 53.4/km^{2} (138/sq mi)
- Time zone: UTC+01:00 (CET)
  - Summer (DST): UTC+02:00 (CEST)
- Postal code: 73410
- ^{1} French Land Register data, which excludes lakes, ponds, glaciers > 1 km^{2} (0.386 sq mi or 247 acres) and river estuaries.

Saint-Germain-la-Chambotte Saint-Germain-la-Chambotte (French pronunciation: [sɛ̃ ʒɛʁmɛ̃ la ʃɑ̃bɔt]; Savoyard: San-Zharmin) was one of the communes located in the Savoie department and the Auvergne-Rhône-Alpes region region in south-eastern France. On 1 January 2016, it was merged into the new commune of Entrelacs.

== See also ==
- Communes of the Savoie department
