= Sales, Haute-Savoie =

Sales
- Commune
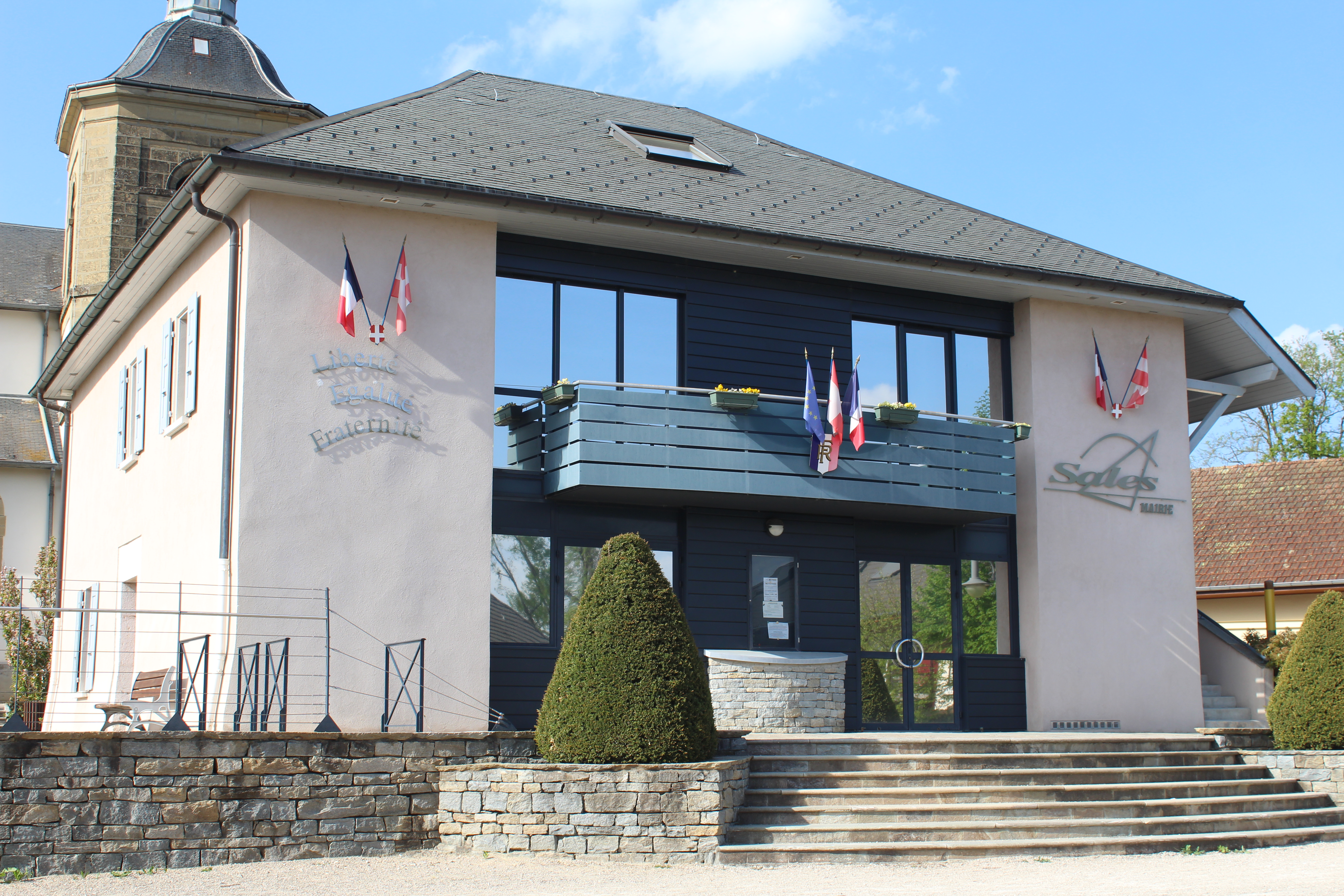
- Town hall
- Location of Sales
- Location within France Location within Auvergne-Rhône-Alpes
- Coordinates: 45°52′33″N 5°57′40″E
- Country: France
- Region: Auvergne-Rhône-Alpes
- Department: Haute-Savoie
- Arrondissement: Annecy
- Canton: Rumilly
- Intercommunality: Rumilly Terre de Savoie

Government
  - Mayor (2020–2026): Yohann Tranchant
- Area^{1}: 9.21 km^{2} (3.56 sq mi)
- Highest elevation: 426 m (1,398 ft)
- Lowest elevation: 310 m (1,020 ft)
- Population (2023): 2,325
  - Density: 252/km^{2} (654/sq mi)
- Time zone: UTC+01:00 (CET)
  - Summer (DST): UTC+02:00 (CEST)
- INSEE/Postal code: 74255 /74150
- ^{1} French Land Register data, which excludes lakes, ponds, glaciers > 1 km^{2} (0.386 sq mi or 247 acres) and river estuaries.

Sales (French pronunciation: [sal]; Arpitan: Sâle) is a commune in the Haute-Savoie department in the Auvergne-Rhône-Alpes region in south-eastern France.

== Geography ==
The Chéran forms the commune's south-western, then flows (at Rumilly) into the Fier, which forms the commune's north-western border. It is part of the urban area of Rumilly.

== Population ==
Historical population
Year	Pop.	±% p.a.
1968	725	—
1975	856	+2.40%
1982	1,050	+2.96%
1990	1,388	+3.55%
1999	1,548	+1.22%
2007	1,527	−0.17%
2012	1,744	+2.69%
2017	1,978	+2.55%
2023	2,325	+2.73%
Source: INSEE

== See also ==
- Communes of the Haute-Savoie department
