= Mognard =

French commune

Mognard Monyâ (Savoyard)
- Part of Entrelacs
- Location of Mognard
- Location within France Location within Auvergne-Rhône-Alpes
- Coordinates: 45°44′59″N 5°57′21″E
- Country: France
- Region: Auvergne-Rhône-Alpes
- Department: Savoie
- Arrondissement: Chambéry
- Canton: Aix-les-Bains-1
- Commune: Entrelacs
- Area^{1}: 4.1 km^{2} (1.6 sq mi)
- Highest elevation: 560 m (1,840 ft)
- Lowest elevation: 320 m (1,050 ft)
- Population (2022): 423
  - Density: 100/km^{2} (270/sq mi)
- Time zone: UTC+01:00 (CET)
  - Summer (DST): UTC+02:00 (CEST)
- Postal code: 73410
- ^{1} French Land Register data, which excludes lakes, ponds, glaciers > 1 km^{2} (0.386 sq mi or 247 acres) and river estuaries.

Mognard (French pronunciation: [mɔɲaʁ]; Savoyard: Monyâ) is a former commune in the Savoie department in the Auvergne-Rhône-Alpes region in south-eastern France. On 1 January 2016, it was merged into the new commune of Entrelacs. The total population of Mognard is 423 as of 2022.

== See also ==
- Communes of the Savoie department
