= Albens =

Albens Arbin (Savoyard)
- Part of Entrelacs
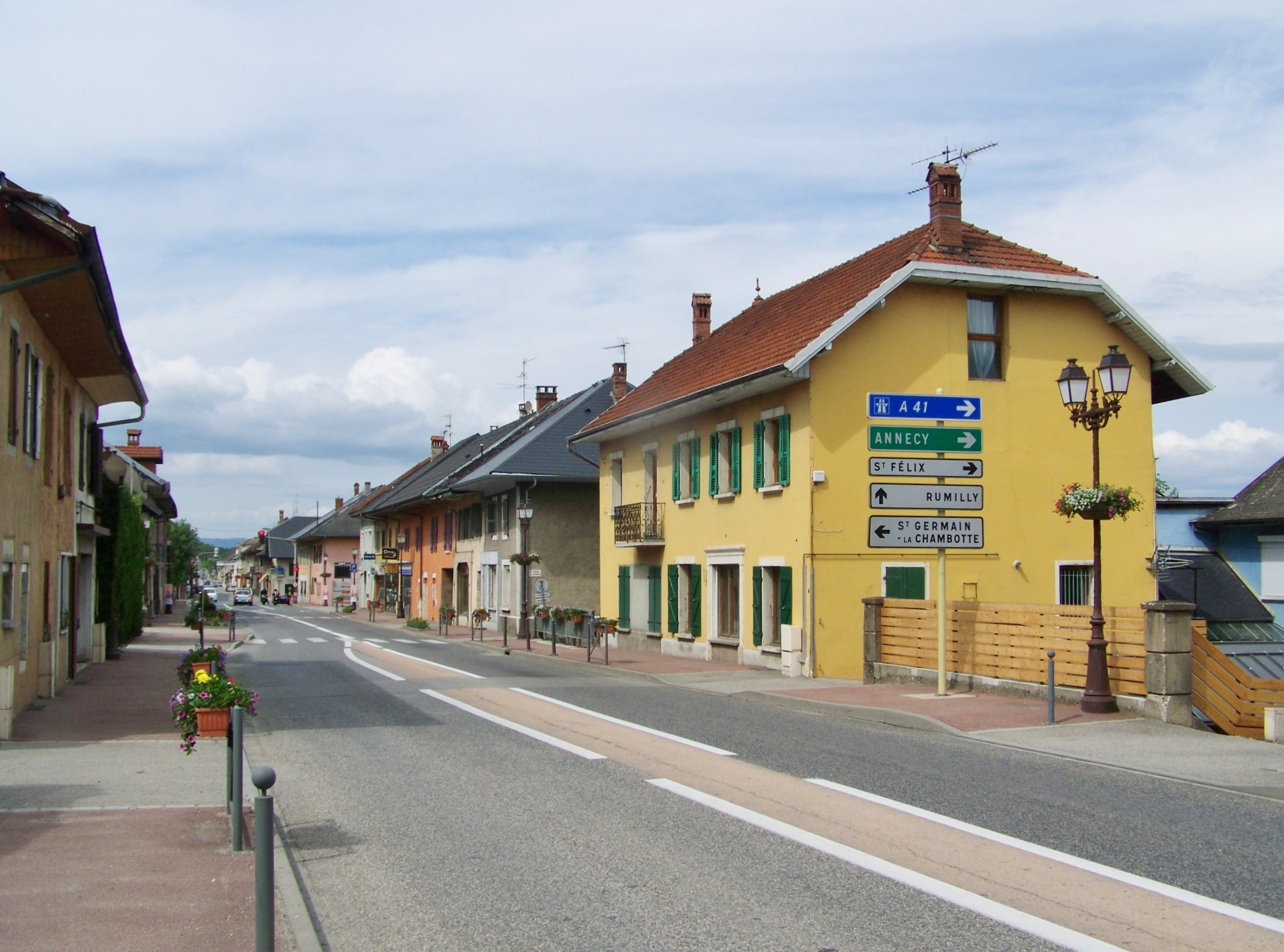
- City center
- Location of Albens
- Location within France Location within Auvergne-Rhône-Alpes
- Coordinates: 45°47′14″N 5°56′45″E
- Country: France
- Region: Auvergne-Rhône-Alpes
- Department: Savoie
- Arrondissement: Chambéry
- Canton: Aix-les-Bains-1
- Commune: Entrelacs
- Area^{1}: 15.3 km^{2} (5.9 sq mi)
- Highest elevation: 685 m (2,247 ft)
- Lowest elevation: 329 m (1,079 ft)
- Population (2021): 3,920
  - Density: 256/km^{2} (664/sq mi)
- Demonym: Albanais
- Time zone: UTC+01:00 (CET)
  - Summer (DST): UTC+02:00 (CEST)
- Postal code: 73410
- ^{1} French Land Register data, which excludes lakes, ponds, glaciers > 1 km^{2} (0.386 sq mi or 247 acres) and river estuaries.

Albens (French pronunciation: [albɛ̃s]; Arpitan: Arbin) is a former commune in the Savoie department in the Auvergne-Rhône-Alpes region in south-eastern France. On 1 January 2016, it was merged into the new commune of Entrelacs.

== Population ==
Historical population
Year	Pop.	±% p.a.
1975	1,661	—
1982	2,150	+3.76%
1990	2,439	+1.59%
1999	2,650	+0.93%
2006	3,025	+1.91%
2011	3,371	+2.19%
2021	3,920	+1.52%
Source: EHESS and INSEE

== See also ==
- Communes of the Savoie department
- Albens station
