= Alby-sur-Chéran =

Alby-sur-Chéran Arbi (Savoyard)
- Commune
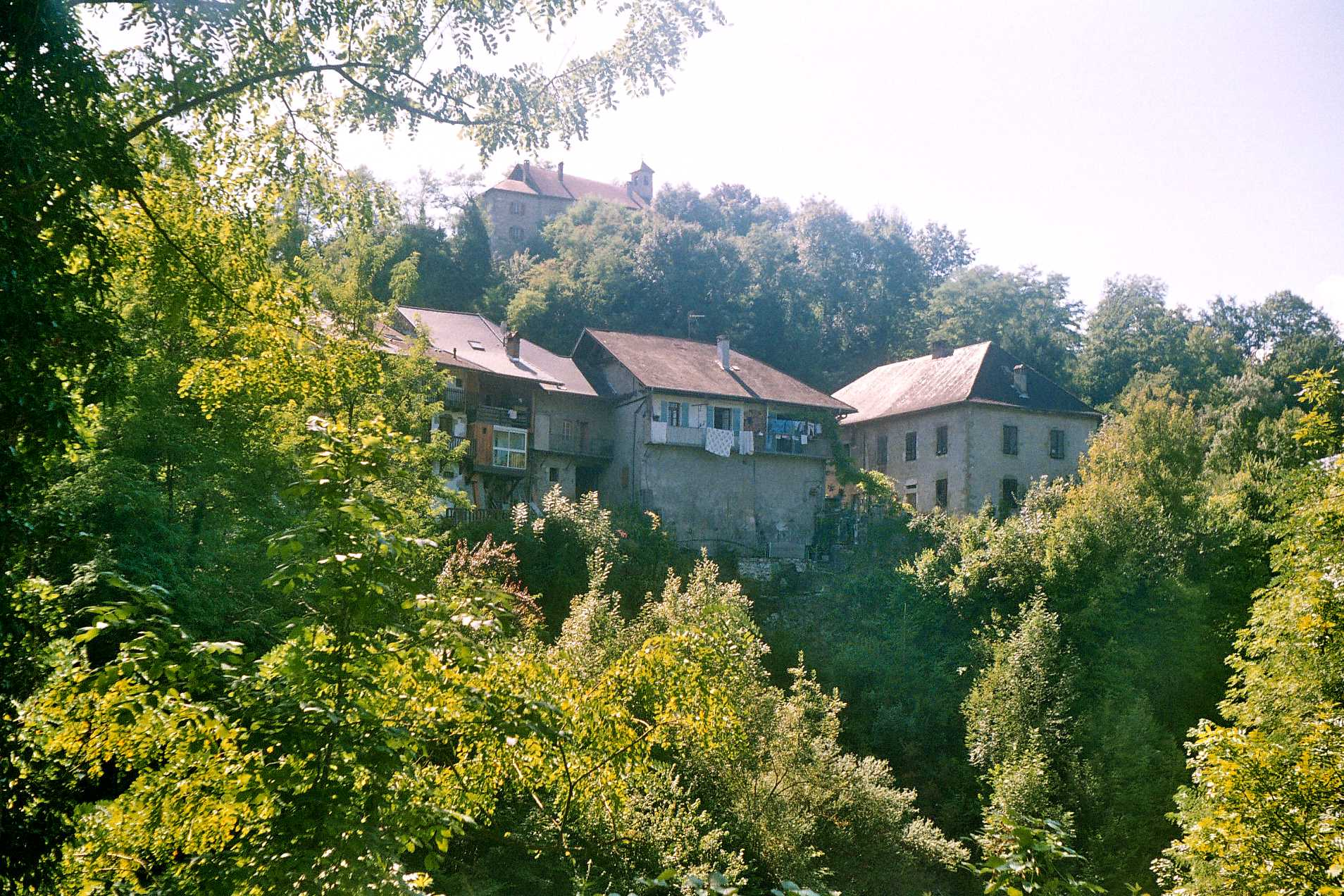
- Alby-sur-Chéran and Saint-Maurice chapel seen from the right bank of the river

- Coat of arms
- Location of Alby-sur-Chéran
- Location within France Location within Auvergne-Rhône-Alpes
- Coordinates: 45°49′03″N 6°01′18″E
- Country: France
- Region: Auvergne-Rhône-Alpes
- Department: Haute-Savoie
- Arrondissement: Annecy
- Canton: Rumilly
- Intercommunality: CA Grand Annecy

Government
  - Mayor (2025–2026): Jocelyne Boch
- Area^{1}: 6.56 km^{2} (2.53 sq mi)
- Highest elevation: 606 m (1,988 ft)
- Lowest elevation: 360 m (1,180 ft)
- Population (2023): 2,664
  - Density: 406/km^{2} (1,050/sq mi)
- Time zone: UTC+01:00 (CET)
  - Summer (DST): UTC+02:00 (CEST)
- INSEE/Postal code: 74002 /74540
- ^{1} French Land Register data, which excludes lakes, ponds, glaciers > 1 km^{2} (0.386 sq mi or 247 acres) and river estuaries.

Alby-sur-Chéran (French pronunciation: [albi syʁ ʃeʁɑ̃], literally Alby on Chéran; Savoyard: Arbi) is a commune in the Haute-Savoie department in the Auvergne-Rhône-Alpes region in south-eastern France.

== Geography ==
The Chéran flows northwestward through the north-eastern part of the commune and crosses the village.

== Population ==
Historical population
Year	Pop.	±% p.a.
1968	782	—
1975	799	+0.31%
1982	1,014	+3.46%
1990	1,224	+2.38%
1999	1,630	+3.23%
2007	1,959	+2.32%
2012	2,188	+2.24%
2017	2,579	+3.34%
2023	2,664	+0.54%
Source: INSEE

== See also ==
- Communes of the Haute-Savoie department
