= Cessens =

Cessens Sèssin (Savoyard)
- Part of Entrelacs
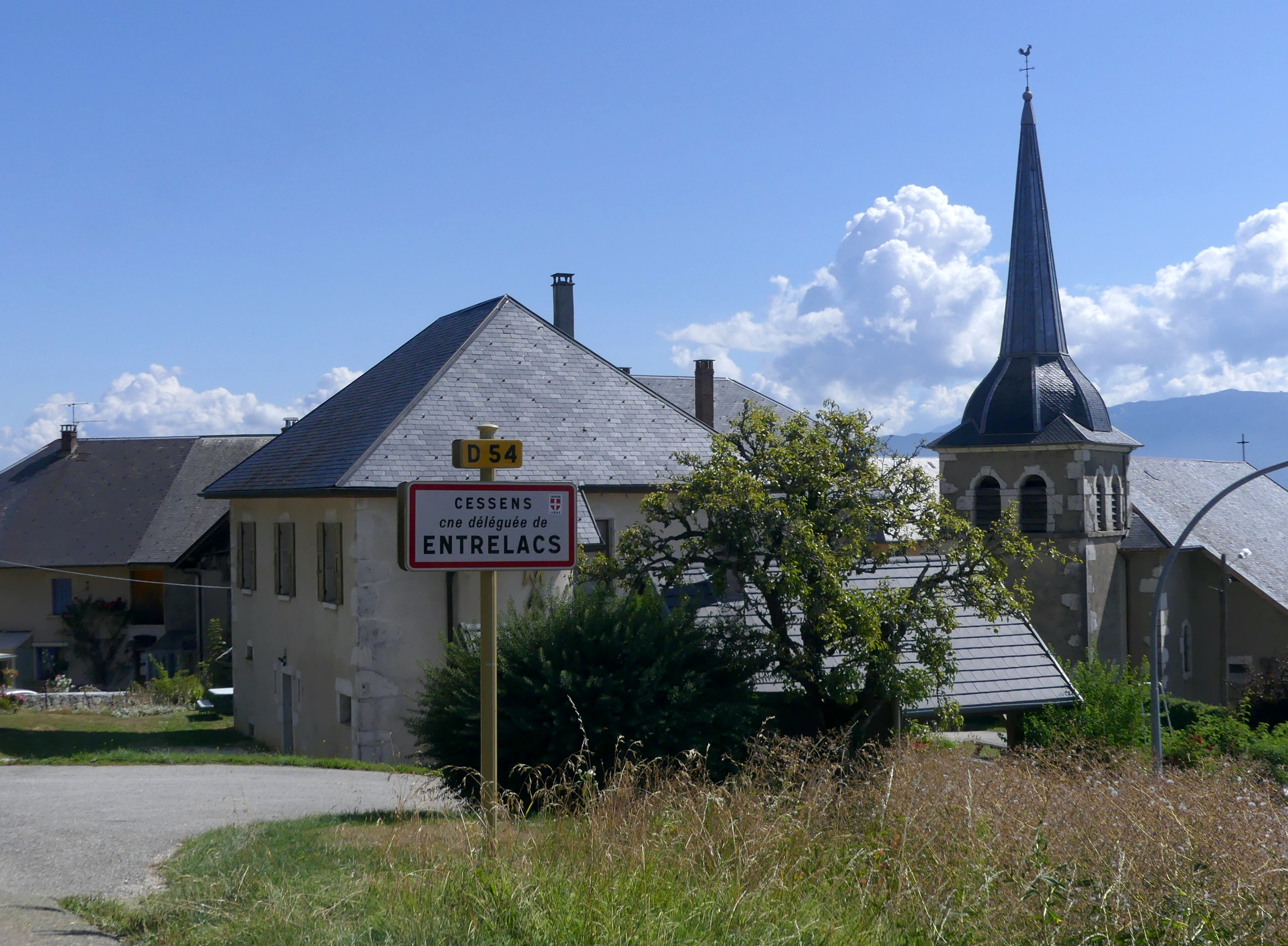
- Location of Cessens
- Location within France Location within Auvergne-Rhône-Alpes
- Coordinates: 45°48′01″N 5°52′58″E
- Country: France
- Region: Auvergne-Rhône-Alpes
- Department: Savoie
- Arrondissement: Chambéry
- Canton: Aix-les-Bains-1
- Commune: Entrelacs
- Area^{1}: 13.29 km^{2} (5.13 sq mi)
- Highest elevation: 982 m (3,222 ft)
- Lowest elevation: 464 m (1,522 ft)
- Population (2022): 473
  - Density: 35.6/km^{2} (92.2/sq mi)
- Demonym: Cessanais
- Time zone: UTC+01:00 (CET)
  - Summer (DST): UTC+02:00 (CEST)
- Postal code: 73410
- ^{1} French Land Register data, which excludes lakes, ponds, glaciers > 1 km^{2} (0.386 sq mi or 247 acres) and river estuaries.

Cessens (Arpitan: Sèssin) is a former commune in the Savoie department in the Auvergne-Rhône-Alpes region in south-eastern France. On 1 January 2016, it was merged into the new commune of Entrelacs.

== See also ==
- Communes of the Savoie department
- Château de Cessens-Vieux
