= Hauteville-sur-Fier =

- Commune
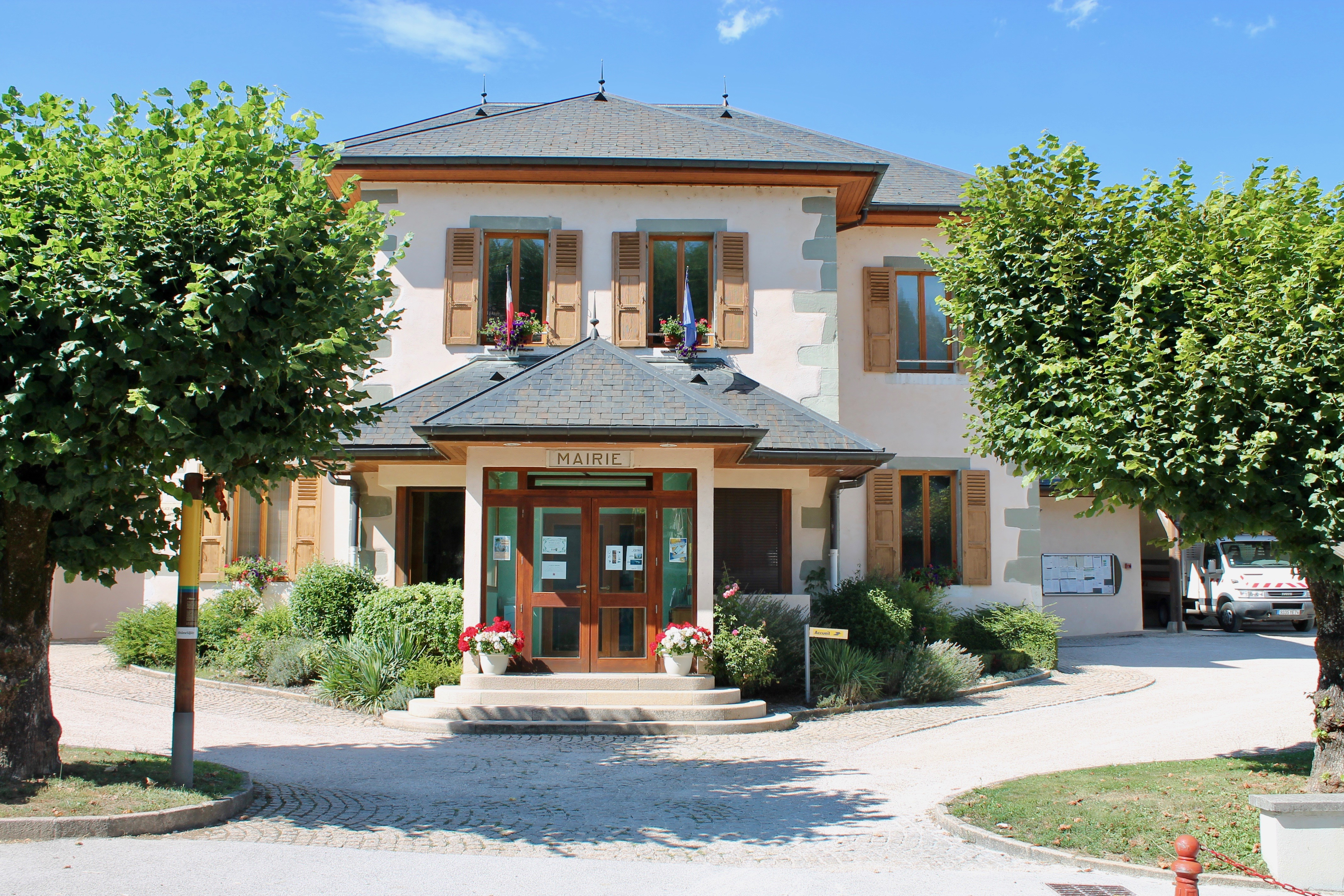
- Location of Hauteville-sur-Fier
- Location within France Location within Auvergne-Rhône-Alpes
- Coordinates: 45°54′16″N 5°58′32″E
- Country: France
- Region: Auvergne-Rhône-Alpes
- Department: Haute-Savoie
- Arrondissement: Annecy
- Canton: Rumilly
- Intercommunality: Rumilly Terre de Savoie

Government
  - Mayor (2020–2026): Roland Lombard
- Area^{1}: 4.9 km^{2} (1.9 sq mi)
- Highest elevation: 524 m (1,719 ft)
- Lowest elevation: 320 m (1,050 ft)
- Population (2023): 1,155
  - Density: 240/km^{2} (610/sq mi)
- Time zone: UTC+01:00 (CET)
  - Summer (DST): UTC+02:00 (CEST)
- INSEE/Postal code: 74141 /74150
- Website: Hautevillesurfier.fr
- ^{1} French Land Register data, which excludes lakes, ponds, glaciers > 1 km^{2} (0.386 sq mi or 247 acres) and river estuaries.

Hauteville-sur-Fier (French pronunciation: [otvil syʁ fjɛʁ], literally Hauteville on Fier; Arpitan: Ôtavèla) is a commune in the Haute-Savoie department in the Auvergne-Rhône-Alpes region in south-eastern France.

== Geography ==
The Fier forms part of the commune's south-western border.

== See also ==
- Communes of the Haute-Savoie department
