= Community of Greater Annecy =

Agglomeration community of France, 2001–2016

Coordinates: 45.8979°N 6.1271°E

The Community of Greater Annecy is a former intercommunality of the Haute-Savoie department in the Rhône-Alpes region of eastern France. It was formed in January 2001 by ten communes. In January 2002 a further three communes joined. In 2003 the name La Communauté de l'agglomération d'Annecy was adopted. On 1 January 2017, the Community of Greater Annecy merged with four others intercommunalities becoming Communauté d'agglomération du Grand Annecy.

== Member communes ==
The following table shows the communes which are part of the Community, their 2012 population and when they joined:

Commune	2012 Population	date joined
Annecy	52,987	2001
Annecy-le-Vieux	20,486	2001
Argonay	2497	2001
Chavanod	2342	2002
Cran-Gevrier	17,039	2001
Epagny	3825	2001
Metz-Tessy	2579	2001
Meythet	8481	2001
Montagny-les-Lanches	553	2002
Poisy	6625	2001
Pringy	3467	2001
Quintal	1138	2002
Seynod	18,396	2001

== History ==
In 1991 10 communes formed the district of Greater Annecy responsible for economic development, urban planning, land use and urban transport.

On 1 January 2001 the Community of Greater Annecy came into being with the same 10 member communes but greater responsibilities. In addition to the earlier functions of economic development, urban planning, land use and urban transport were the following:

- Water: water production and distribution, protection of the sources of water supply of the city.
- Sports facilities management: planning and managing gyms for colleges and high schools, reconstruction and management of the Berthollet school gymnasium, development and management of new gyms and new areas of sports colleges, participation in management of Semnoz ski resort.
- Elder Services: management of the House for the elderly and the residence La Cour in Annecy-le-Vieux.

On 1 January 2002 three more communes joined the Community: Chavanod, Montagny-les-Lanches and Quintal. The Community expanded its responsibilities to include:

- Waste management: collection of household waste.
- Tourism: management of the Office of Tourism, management of the convention centre, the construction of new facilities and their management, creation of a centre on technology information from virtual images.

Sports management: setting policy for and management of medical sports center. Management of cultural facilities: equipment and management of the School of Art, Annecy Castle Museum, the Palais de l'Isle museum, Bonlieu Scène nationale theatre, the Rabelais Meythet cinema and performance space, and the Glace Bris (Ice Breaker) auditorium.

- Elder services: management of other facilities for the elderly and creation of an Intercommunal Centre for Social Action.

On 1 January 2003 the Community further expanded its responsibilities: Sports facilities management: the Jean Régis d'Annecy ice rink and various swimming pools and water parks. Management of cultural facilities: upgrade of auditorium facilities at Seynod, the equipping and management of the National School of Music and Dance, and a central library at Bonlieu.
