= The Returned (French TV series) =

French supernatural drama television series

- French: Les Revenants
- Genre: Supernatural; Drama; Horror; Mystery
- Created by: Fabrice Gobert
- Based on: They Came Back by Robin Campillo
- Written by: Fabrice Gobert; Emmanuel Carrère; Fabien Adda; Camille Fontaine; Nathalie Saugeon; Audrey Fouché; Coline Abert
- Directed by: Fabrice Gobert; Frédéric Mermoud; Frédéric Goupil
- Starring: Anne Consigny; Frédéric Pierrot; Clotilde Hesme; Céline Sallette; Samir Guesmi; Grégory Gadebois; Guillaume Gouix; Jérôme Kircher; Laurent Lucas; Michaël Abiteboul; Pierre Perrier; Jean-François Sivadier; Alix Poisson; Yara Pilartz; Jenna Thiam; Brune Martin; Constance Dollé; Swann Nambotin; Ana Girardot
- Opening theme: "Hungry Face" by Mogwai
- Composer: Mogwai
- Country of origin: France
- Original language: French
- No. of seasons: 2
- No. of episodes: 16

Production
- Producers: Caroline Benjo; Jimmy Desmarais; Barbara Letellier
- Cinematography: Patrick Blossier
- Running time: 50–58 minutes
- Production company: Haut et Court

Original release
- Network: Canal+
- Release: 26 November 2012 – 19 October 2015

Related
- The Returned

The Returned (French: Les Revenants) is a French supernatural drama television series created by Fabrice Gobert, based on the 2004 French film They Came Back (Les Revenants), directed by Robin Campillo. The series debuted on 26 November 2012 on Canal+ and completed its first season of eight episodes, on 17 December. In 2013, the first season won an International Emmy for Best Drama Series.

The second season, also comprising eight episodes, premiered on 28 September 2015 on Canal+. It premiered in the UK on 16 October 2015 on More4, and in the US on 31 October 2015 on SundanceTV.

== Premise ==
In a small French mountain town many dead people reappear apparently alive and normal, including teenage school bus crash victim Camille, suicidal bridegroom Simon, a small boy called "Victor" who was murdered by burglars, and serial killer Serge. While they try to resume their lives, strange phenomena take place: recurring power outages; a mysterious lowering of the local reservoir's water level, revealing the presence of dead animals and a church steeple; the appearance of strange marks on the bodies of the living and the dead.

== Cast and characters ==
=== Main characters ===
The "Returned"

- Yara Pilartz as Camille Séguret, 15-year-old girl killed in a bus accident four years earlier, and now younger than Léna
- Swann Nambotin as Victor/Louis Lewanski, 8-year-old boy who died 35 years prior
- Pierre Perrier as Simon Delaître, 23 years old, died the day of his wedding to Adèle a decade earlier
- Guillaume Gouix as Serge Garrel, a serial killer who was killed by his brother Toni seven years earlier
- Ana Girardot as Lucy Clarsen, murdered waitress
- Laetitia de Fombelle as Viviane Costa, 45 years old, wife of Michel Costa, died 34 years earlier
- Ernst Umhauer as Virgil, teenager murdered 35 years ago (season 2)
- Armande Boulanger as Audrey Sabatini, daughter of Sandrine and Yan, classmate of Camille who died in the same bus accident (season 2)
- Thomas Doret as Esteban Koretzky, died in the bus accident (season 2)
- Mélodie Richard as Esther, a young woman killed seven years before (season 2)
- Michaël Abiteboul as Milan Garrel, father of Serge and Toni, who died 35 years earlier (season 2)
- Vladimir Consigny as Morgane, boyfriend/client of Lucy's, died 35 years earlier

Others

- Jenna Thiam as Léna Séguret, Camille's twin sister, now 19
- Anne Consigny as Claire Séguret, mother of Léna and Camille
- Frédéric Pierrot as Jérôme Séguret, father of Léna and Camille, now separated from Claire
- Jean-François Sivadier as Pierre
- Grégory Gadebois as Toni Garrel, brother of Serge
- Clotilde Hesme as Adèle Werther, Simon's former fiancée
- Brune Martin as Chloé Delaitre, 9, daughter of Adèle Werther and Simon Delaitre
- Céline Sallette as Julie Meyer, a doctor who finds and cares for "Victor"
- Claude Leveque as Michel Costa, elderly widower of Viviane Costa, who is attended to by Julie Meyer
- Samir Guesmi as Thomas Mézache
- Alix Poisson as Laure Valère
- Constance Dollé as Sandrine Sabatini
- Jérôme Kircher as Father Jean-François
- Laurent Lucas as Berg

=== Recurring characters ===
- Bertrand Constant as Bruno
- Matila Malliarakis as Frédéric
- Guillaume Marquet as Alcide
- Franck Adrien as Yan Sabatini
- Carole Franck as Mademoiselle Payet
- Laurent Capelluto as the army major
- Alice Butaud as Madame Lewanski
- Pauline Parigot as Ophélie
- Nicolas Wanczycki as Lieutenant Janvier
- Aurélien Recoing as Etienne Berg

== Episodes ==
=== Season 1 (2012) ===
No. overall	No. in season	Title	Directed by	Written by	Original release date	French viewers (millions)
1	1	"Camille"	Fabrice Gobert	Fabrice Gobert & Emmanuel Carrère	26 November 2012	1.42
Jérôme and Claire are shocked when their daughter, Camille, who was killed in a bus accident four years earlier, returns home unharmed and unaware that anything has happened to her. Simon attempts to find his fiancée, Adèle, not knowing that he died ten years earlier. Monsieur Costa is deeply disturbed when his wife, who died 30 years earlier, shows up at their home. He hides her from his nurse, Julie, and later burns down his home with Madame Costa tied inside, before committing suicide by jumping from the dam. Julie is followed home by a young boy who refuses to speak. When her neighbour, Mademoiselle Payet, questions the boy's presence, Julie pretends he is her nephew, Victor. Lucy, a waitress who claims to be a medium, is stabbed on her way home from the bar. In a flashback to the day of the bus accident, it is revealed that Camille's twin, Léna, pretended to be sick in order to avoid the school trip. Her boyfriend, Frédéric, sneaked into her bedroom and Camille becomes distressed when she "senses" her twin reaching orgasm during her first sexual encounter. As Camille tried to get the bus to stop, the distracted driver noticed Victor standing in the middle of the road and swerved to avoid him, causing the bus to plummet over the cliff's edge.
2	2	"Simon"	Fabrice Gobert	Fabrice Gobert & Emmanuel Carrère	26 November 2012	1.42
Jérôme, Claire, and Léna - now four years older than her twin - adjust to having Camille back. Adèle, who has begun arrangements for her wedding to Thomas, makes peace with what she believes are visions of Simon, who has finally located her. After assaulting a café owner, Simon is arrested. The police are on high alert after Lucy is found stabbed, as the attacker's modus operandi matches that of a serial killer who ravaged the town seven years earlier. The police suspect Toni, a bar owner. However, Toni knows the real serial killer is his brother, Serge, whom he killed seven years ago and who he is shocked to find has returned. Meanwhile, dam engineers notice that the water level in the reservoir has dropped suddenly.
3	3	"Julie"	Fabrice Gobert	Fabrice Gobert & Emmanuel Carrère	3 December 2012	1.40
Jérôme and Claire consider moving with their daughters to a new town. Camille attempts to live a normal life, pretending to be Léna's cousin, Alice, so that she can walk around town without raising suspicion. Simon, released by the police, contacts Adèle. She shows him their daughter, Chloé, who was conceived shortly before his death. When Adèle learns that other people have talked to a man named Simon, she realizes he may not be a vision after all. Julie is threatened by Mademoiselle Payet, who believes Julie has illegally adopted Victor. While Julie is at work, Victor pays Mademoiselle Payet a visit. She is later discovered dead from "self-inflicted" stab wounds.
4	4	"Victor"	Fabrice Gobert	Fabrice Gobert & Emmanuel Carrère	3 December 2012	1.40
Julie is devastated when her ex-girlfriend, Laure, takes Victor to a local shelter run by Pierre. There, Victor realizes that Pierre is one of the two men who invaded his house 35 years ago, although it was not Pierre who murdered him. Thomas uses his home surveillance equipment to watch Adèle, who has reignited her relationship with Simon and introduced him to Chloé, under the guise that he is an angel. Léna is rushed to the hospital after a scar on her back, inflicted by Jérôme a year earlier, becomes aggravated. After leaving the hospital, she finds Camille at a bar with Frédérick and yells at her sister, thinking Camille is somehow to blame. Léna becomes faint after leaving the bar and is found by Serge. The water level at the reservoir continues to drop, but engineers can find no faults in the dam.
5	5	"Serge & Toni"	Frédéric Mermoud	Fabrice Gobert, Emmanuel Carrère & Fabien Adda	10 December 2012	1.30
Victor leaves the shelter with Madame Costa, and they discuss their respective deaths at the café. Serge decides not to kill Léna and, instead, takes her to his house so that he can nurse her back to health. Adèle is horrified to learn that Simon killed himself and decides not to leave town with him as planned. Thomas shoots Simon dead, believing Simon means to hurt Adèle. Victor returns to the shelter and confronts Pierre, who begs his forgiveness. Divers at the reservoir find dead animals at the bottom of the lake, with autopsies revealing that they drowned trying to escape from something.
6	6	"Lucy"	Frédéric Mermoud	Fabrice Gobert, Fabien Adda, Camille Fontaine & Nathalie Saugeon	10 December 2012	1.30
Lucy wakes up in the hospital, having returned. Suspecting that Alice is in fact Camille, Frédéric and his friend dig up Camille's coffin; it contains only reservoir water. Pierre organizes a meeting with the parents of the children killed in the bus accident. He reveals that Camille is alive, thinking she can comfort them. However, her return and hope-giving comments only convince the parents of another child, Esteban, to commit suicide so they can be with him sooner. Simon wakes up in the morgue, having returned again. Victor returns to Julie, who sees that the skin on his arm shows signs of decay. Léna grows closer to Serge. However, she is forced to flee after Toni shoots a policeman in order to protect his brother. Léna hides in the forest, where she discovers a large group of people standing around a fire.
7	7	"Adèle"	Frédéric Mermoud	Fabrice Gobert & Fabien Adda	17 December 2012	1.30
Pierre shows Claire his shelter stocked with food and firearms, as he believes the appearance of the returned marks the end of days. Lucy appears to understand the purpose of the returned, and she persuades Simon that he no longer needs Adèle. Father Jean-François betrays Simon to the police, and they arrest him. Serge and Toni run from the police, and Toni thinks he sees their deceased mother in the woods. While trying to cross the lake, Serge is dragged under the water by something unseen. Léna finds her way to the shelter. She makes up with Camille and helps her sister conceal the decaying skin on her face with makeup. Simon finds that the skin on his stomach has begun to decay, too. Laure and Julie reignite their relationship. They attempt to leave town with Victor but are bewildered to find that they are physically unable to leave. Lucy finds a large group of the returned, welcoming them with a smile.
8	8	"The Horde" "La Horde"	Frédéric Mermoud & Fabrice Gobert	Fabrice Gobert & Fabien Adda	17 December 2012	1.30
A flashback to the day Camille returned shows her, and the rest of the returned, waking up in the forest by the dam. Having spent the night in their car, Julie and Laure awake to Victor telling them that the returned tried to take him during the night. After Julie prevents Toni from attempting suicide by jumping from the dam, the returned appear once more, and the group escapes. On their way to the shelter, Victor learns that Toni killed Serge and forces Toni to shoot himself dead in retribution. Simon breaks free from his jail cell and finds Adèle, telling her she is now pregnant with their second child. Simon and Lucy kidnap Chloé. Thomas finds Adèle and takes her to the shelter. That night, the returned arrive at the shelter. Lucy promises they will return Chloé in exchange for Camille, Victor, and Madame Costa. The exchange is completed, with Claire and Julie choosing to accompany Camille and Victor. Lucy then demands that Adèle join them too, because she is pregnant with Simon's baby. Thomas refuses to let Adèle leave, and the police lock the living inside the shelter before engaging in a shootout. In the morning, the living discover that both the returned and the police have disappeared, and the town has flooded.

=== Season 2 (2015) ===
No. overall	No. in season	Title	Directed by	Written by	Original release date	French viewers (millions)
9	1	"The Child" "L'enfant"	Fabrice Gobert, Frédéric Goupil	Fabrice Gobert, Audrey Fouché, Coline Abert, Fabien Adda	28 September 2015	0.610
Six months after the flood, engineers work to fix the dam. The town is now under military control, with the military refusing to believe the survivors from the shelter. Léna continues to search for Camille and Claire, and becomes worried that Jérôme has started drinking again. Adèle is admitted to the hospital after falling down the stairs, although Chloé accuses Adèle of throwing herself down the stairs deliberately, in order to abort Simon's baby. Meanwhile, the military discovers Audrey, a classmate of Camille's who was killed in the bus accident. Lucy lures Audrey away from the military and takes her to a part of the town where the returned have been living, accessible now only by crossing the water. Among those living there are Camille and Claire, who take in Audrey, as well as Julie and Victor, who are shocked when Victor's mother returns.
10	2	"Milan"	Fabrice Gobert, Frédéric Goupil	Fabrice Gobert, Audrey Fouché, Fabien Adda	28 September 2015	0.610
For her own health and that of her unborn son, Adèle is forced to give birth three months early. Julie becomes worried when Victor seems frightened of his own mother. Camille explains what happened to Audrey and Esteban, another classmate who died in the bus accident, and they do not believe her until Virgil takes them to the memorial erected at the site of the bus accident. Claire is afraid the returned are going to hurt her, before a mysterious stranger helps her. Léna tries to warn Toni, who has returned, not to trust Pierre. She later learns that her father has been trying to understand why certain people have returned but not others. Serge is burdened with the return of his father, Milan. Lucy also appears frightened by Milan's return. In a flashback to the night Victor was murdered, it is revealed that Milan and Monsieur Costa organized the home invasion, and that Pierre saved Monsieur Lewanski.
11	3	"Morgane"	Fabrice Gobert, Frédéric Goupil	Fabrice Gobert, Audrey Fouché, Coline Abert	5 October 2015	0.400
Esteban runs away after learning that his parents committed suicide. Camille tracks him down with the help of a strange boy, who tells her the returned will prevent them from leaving. Toni is held hostage by Pierre, who wants to know the location of the returned. Simon and Lucy welcome an increasing number of the returned, while Simon and Chloé plot to steal the baby, Nathan, from Adèle. Milan instructs Serge to kill Léna. When Serge fails to do so, Milan stabs Léna himself. Serge shoots his father, and takes Léna to Camille and Claire. Victor tells Julie that she was pregnant when she was stabbed by Serge. Shocked, Julie leaves. The bodies of all but one of the policemen involved in the shootout are found hanging from their torsos, on trees in the woods. Berg thinks he might have found the reason for the flood. In a flashback it is revealed that Milan killed Lucy 35 years earlier.
12	4	"Virgil"	Fabrice Gobert, Frédéric Goupil	Fabrice Gobert, Audrey Fouché, Fabien Adda	5 October 2015	0.400
In a flashback it is revealed that Virgil, the boy Camille has befriended, was murdered by Milan 35 years earlier. Julie visits Victor's old house, where an elderly neighbor tells her Monsieur Lewanski is in the hospital, and the home invasion was committed because people believed Victor was responsible for the breaking of the dam. Jérôme and Berg also visit Victor's old house, and find his drawings of the deaths of almost all of the returned. Lucy informs Simon that she gave his baby to Simon's birth parents. However, Simon finds out that his parents died as part of a murder-suicide cult, and so he decides to take the baby back to Adèle, allowing Audrey to leave the domain with him. Lucy finds Milan. Although she forgives him, she kills him and dumps his body in the lake. Toni is finally saved by Serge.
13	5	"Madame Costa" "Mme Costa"	Fabrice Gobert, Frédéric Goupil	Fabrice Gobert, Audrey Fouché, Coline Abert	12 October 2015	0.448
In a flashback to the day Madame Costa died, it is revealed that she was walking her dog across the frozen lake, fell through the ice, and drowned. In the present, she leaves the domain with Victor after he has a nightmare about Julie, who goes to visit Monsieur Lewanski in the hospital. Camille, Léna, and Claire try to adjust as Esteban leaves. Audrey is taken in by Jérôme and Berg after she tells them how to get to the domain. When Sandrine learns of her daughter's return, she tells Pierre and reluctantly allows him to kidnap Audrey. Simon, Adèle, Chloé, and Nathan find refuge at the church with Father Jean-François. Lucy tries to convince Alcide to help her find Nathan. Toni and Serge are visited by Serge's former victims. Milan returns again.
14	6	"Esther"	Fabrice Gobert, Frédéric Goupil	Fabrice Gobert, Audrey Fouché, Coline Abert	12 October 2015	0.448
Toni forces Serge to take Esther, one of his victims, back to the house where she lived before she was murdered. When they find the place abandoned, Esther heads toward the tunnel where she died. In a flashback, it is revealed that she was warned by Victor not to enter the tunnel. Camille tells Léna that nobody attacked her or Claire when they tried to leave the domain, and that Claire beat herself. Léna thus tries to leave in order to get help, which she soon finds in the form of Jérôme and Berg. Sandrine is uncertain that Pierre is telling the truth about the returned. Frédéric and Lucho find Victor and Madame Costa at Julie's apartment and, after a heated argument, Lucho shoots Madame Costa. Victor makes him jump from the balcony in retribution. Adèle goes to the police to see Thomas' body, and Lucy pays a visit to Simon and Chloé. Monsieur Lewanski finally wakes up from his coma and reveals to Julie that Victor is not actually his son, but appeared in their household one night in the same way he appeared to Julie.
15	7	"Etienne"	Fabrice Gobert, Frédéric Goupil	Fabrice Gobert, Audrey Fouché, Fabien Adda	19 October 2015	0.430
In a flashback, it is revealed that Milan formed a murder-suicide cult after the dam broke 35 years ago. Although Pierre was a part of the cult, he was the only member who did not follow through. After Virgil fails to convince Camille to leave with him and the other returned, the Segurets escape the domain and are found by the military. After returning again, Madame Costa tells Julie that Victor is looking for her. Julie goes to find him at The Helping Hand but is quickly imprisoned by Pierre, along with Audrey and Sandrine. The returned abandon Lucy after realizing she does not know where she is leading them. Berg finds his father, Etienne, who built the original dam. In a flashback, it is revealed that Victor warned Etienne not to build the dam, and that Etienne joined the murder-suicide cult out of guilt. Victor has an argument with Milan which is interrupted by an officer. Victor makes the officer shoot his colleagues and then collapses the electricity grid, allowing Adèle, Chloé, Camille, Jérôme, Léna, and Claire to escape the police station.
16	8	"The Returned" "Les Revenants"	Fabrice Gobert, Frédéric Goupil	Fabrice Gobert, Audrey Fouché	19 October 2015	0.430
The Segurets attempt to escape town but encounter Frédérick on the road. He shoots Camille, and Claire shoots him in retribution. When Camille returns to life, she tells her family she must leave with the other returned, or else her body will decay. Although Toni decides to leave with the other returned, too, Serge decides to stay behind, and his body begins to decay as a result. After Sandrine dies and Audrey is found eating her corpse, the survivors living at The Helping Hand realize they must leave for their own safety. Pierre finds Milan and expresses regret that he did not follow through with the murder-suicide cult. Although Milan assures him they were wrong to think they would be saved by killing themselves, Pierre shoots himself dead. Simon and Adèle try to find Nathan in the woods and end up in a cave, where they appear to look just as they did on their wedding day. Chloé, Jérôme, Léna, and Claire finally leave town. Lucy leads the returned, including Victor, to a giant sinkhole. Julie appears, saying she cannot live without Victor, and jumps into the hole. Without explanation, Julie then awakens beside the now water-filled sinkhole to see that only Victor is left. Sometime later, they and Ophélie are seen having fun at the beach. Lucy leaves Nathan on an unknown couple's doorstep.

== Production ==
The series was shot in Haute-Savoie, mainly in the city of Annecy, and in Seynod, Menthon-Saint-Bernard, Poisy, Cran-Gevrier, Sévrier, Annecy-le-Vieux, Veyrier-du-Lac, and Semnoz. The dam, which plays an important role, is the Barrage de Tignes. The first season of the series was filmed in April and May 2012. It was directed by Fabrice Gobert and Frédéric Mermoud.

The second season of the series was directed by Fabrice Gobert and Frédéric Goupil. It was originally to be filmed in February and March 2014, for screening from November 2014. However, delays in the writing process pushed filming back until the second half of 2014, and broadcast began in 2015. The synopsis for the second season was released in August 2014, which confirmed there would be a total of eight episodes. Filming for the second season ended on 7 April 2015.

=== Music ===
The series' music was composed by the Scottish post-rock band Mogwai. The band's guitarist John Cummings said in an interview with The Quietus, "They wanted us to start writing it before they started filming it. They described it as inspiring them, they wanted some kind of musical mood in place before they started, so we were working a bit dry at first ... we'd (only) seen the first couple of scripts in English". The band released a four-track sampler of the music (Les Revenants EP) on 17 December 2012, the day of the showing of the final episode. A full-length soundtrack album, Les Revenants, was released on 25 February 2013. In August 2014, it was confirmed that Mogwai would also write the soundtrack for the second season.

== Reception ==
The series has been critically acclaimed. On Rotten Tomatoes, the first season holds an approval rating of 100% with an average score of 9.2 out of 10 based on 39 reviews and a critics' consensus of, "A pleasant change from typically gory zombie shows, The Returned is a must-see oddity that's both smart and sure to disturb". The second season of the show holds a rating of 95%, with an average score of 9.1 out of 10 based on 20 reviews and a consensus of, "After a long wait, The Returned is back with more of the chilling, deliberate, and masterful storytelling that made season one a spooky success". Le Monde said the series marked a resurgence in the fantasy genre with the dead appearing out of nowhere, trying to regain their lives where they left off. Libération said the series recalled the atmosphere of Twin Peaks by David Lynch. In France, viewing figures averaged 1.4 million over the eight episodes, on Canal+.

For its American showing, the series received a 92 out of 100 rating from Metacritic, which averages critics' reviews, based on 28 reviews. The second season received an 82 out of 100 rating based on 11 reviews.

During a visit to Paris, Stephen King remarked on being a big fan of the show and later tweeted about it.

=== Accolades ===
In 2013, for the 41st International Emmy Award, The Returned won for Best Drama Series. For the 18th Satellite Awards, it received a nomination for Best Television Series or Miniseries, Genre. In 2014, it was awarded with a Peabody Award. It received a nomination for Outstanding Achievement in Movies, Miniseries and Specials for the 2014 TCA Awards. Fabien Adda and Fabrice Gobert received a nomination for Best Screenplay for the episode "The Horde", for the 2013 Bram Stoker Awards.

== International broadcasts ==
Season 1 was broadcast in the United Kingdom from 9 June 2013 on Channel 4. It was the first "fully subtitled drama" on the channel in more than 20 years and was screened in French, with English subtitles. First announced under the English name Rebound, the title was amended to The Returned prior to broadcast. The channel made a feature of the subtitles by broadcasting a specially commissioned advertisement break in French with English subtitles. In the United States, SundanceTV began broadcasting the series' first season on 31 October 2013, before picking up the second season on 11 January 2014. The series began airing in Australia on SBS Two on 11 February 2014. In Canada, the series debuted on 26 April 2014 on Space.

In advance of the second-season premiere, the first two episodes of the season received an advance preview screening at the 2015 Toronto International Film Festival, as part of the festival's new Primetime platform of selected television projects. The second season premiered on 16 October 2015 on More4 in the United Kingdom and on 31 October 2015 in the U.S. on SundanceTV.

=== International ratings ===
==== Season 1 ====
United Kingdom
No.	Airdate	Viewers (millions)
1	9 June 2013	1.91
2	16 June 2013	1.60
3	23 June 2013	1.53
4	30 June 2013	1.57
5	7 July 2013	1.50
6	14 July 2013	1.48
7	21 July 2013	1.51
8	28 July 2013	1.38

==== Season 2 ====
United Kingdom			United States	
No.	Airdate	Viewers (millions)	Airdate	Viewers (millions)
9	16 October 2015	0.571	31 October 2015	0.123
10	23 October 2015	0.302	7 November 2015	0.100
11	30 October 2015	0.286	14 November 2015	0.127
12	6 November 2015	N/A	21 November 2015	0.082
13	13 November 2015	N/A	28 November 2015	0.092
14	20 November 2015	0.256	5 December 2015	0.072
15	27 November 2015	N/A	12 December 2015	0.062
16	4 December 2015	N/A	19 December 2015	0.072

== Home media release ==
The first season was released on DVD in France on 20 December 2012 and in the UK on 9 September 2013. In the United States, the first season was released on both DVD and Blu-ray on 11 February 2014 and the second season on 17 December 2019.

== Adaptations ==
In May 2013, it was revealed that an English-language adaptation was in development by Paul Abbott and FremantleMedia, with the working title They Came Back. In September 2013, it was revealed that Abbott was no longer involved with the project and that A&E would develop it. In April 2014, A&E ordered 10 episodes with Carlton Cuse and Raelle Tucker as executive producers. The series premiered on 9 March 2015 and was cancelled after one season.
