= Quintal, Haute-Savoie =

Quintal
- Commune
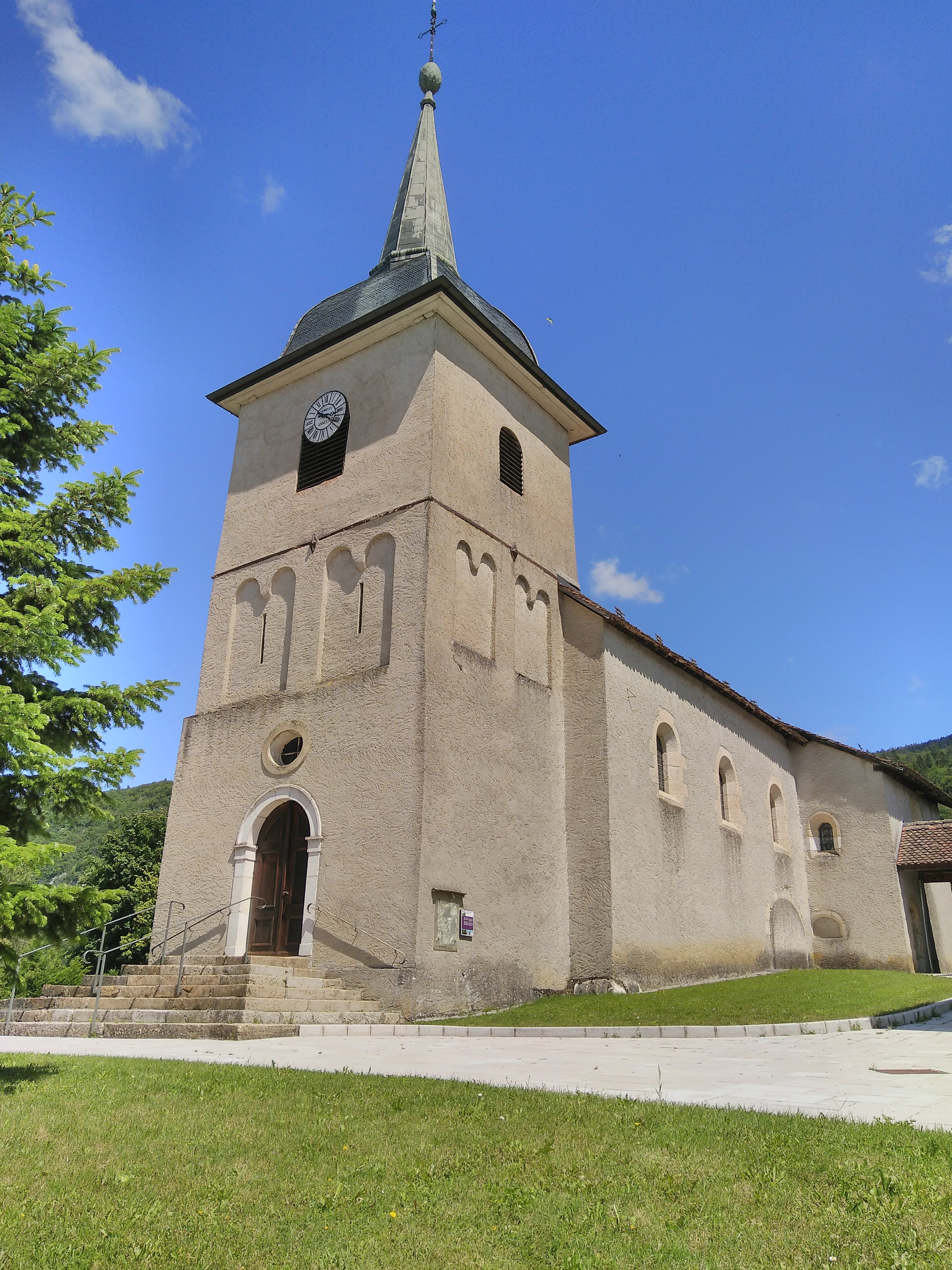
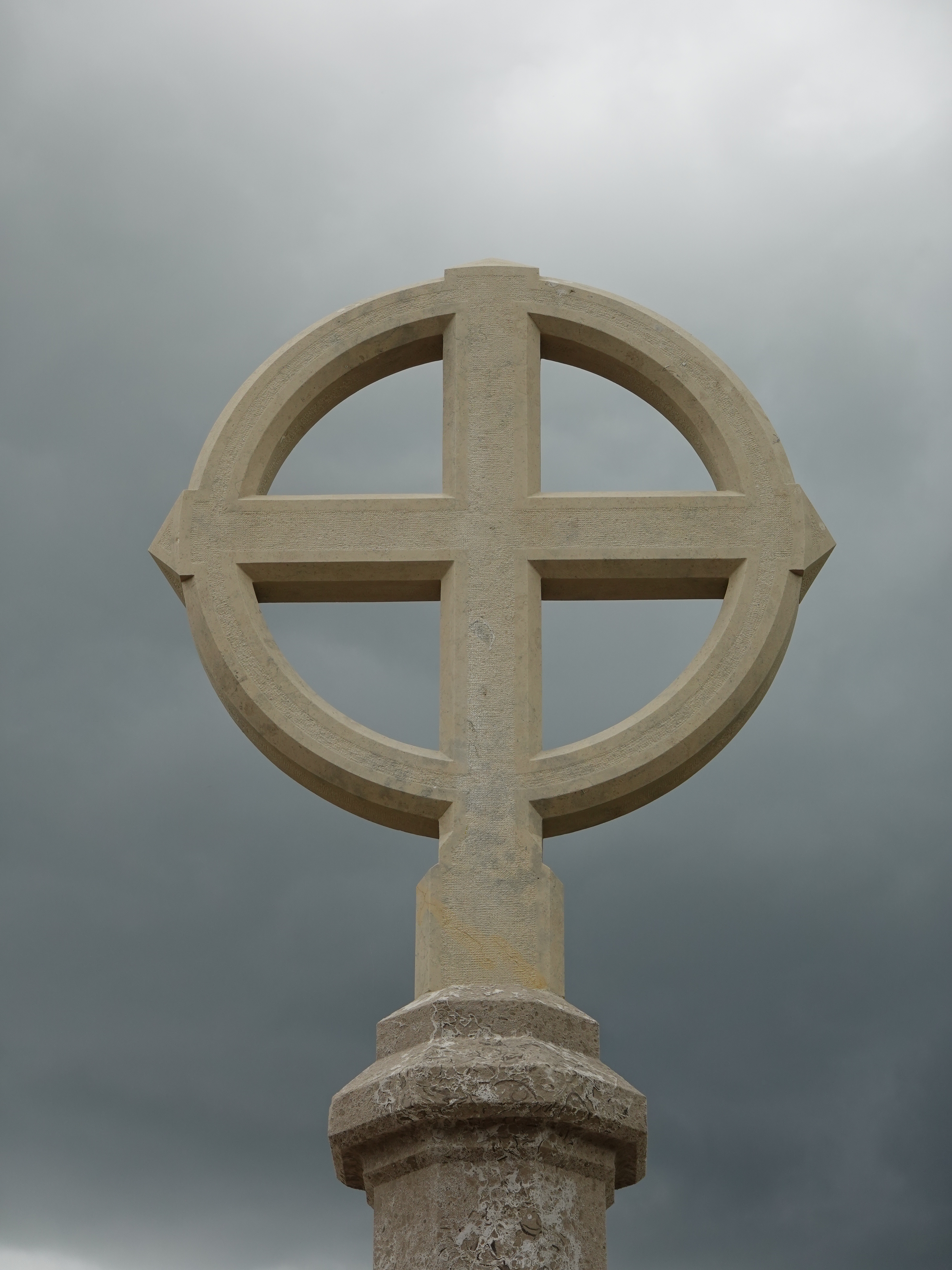
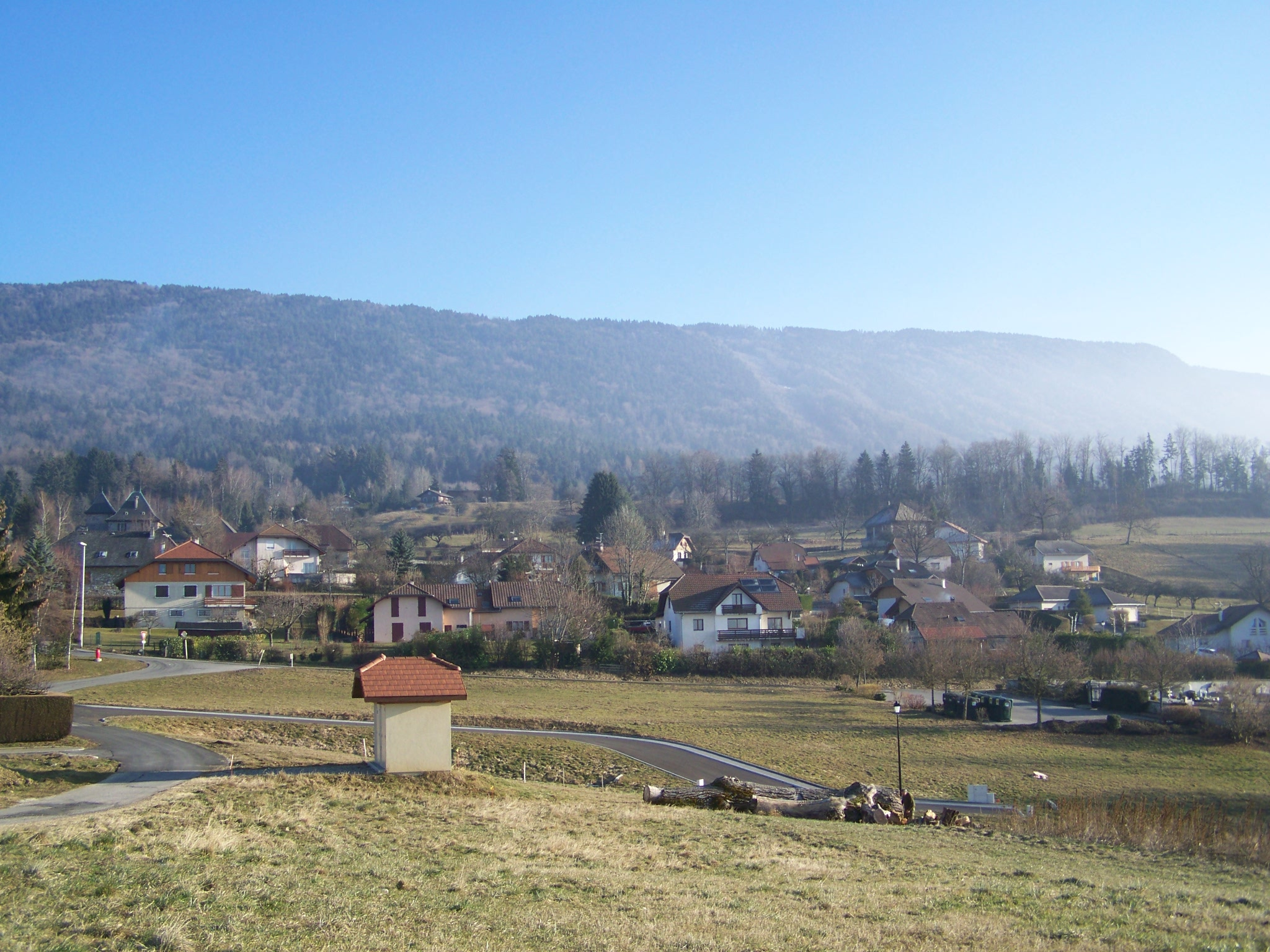
- Left to right, top to bottom : the Church of the Visitation of Quintal ; the "Croix ronde" wayside cross ; a view on the Semnoz mountain from Quintal's center.

- Coat of arms
- Location of Quintal
- Location within France Location within Auvergne-Rhône-Alpes
- Coordinates: 45°50′28″N 6°05′07″E
- Country: France
- Region: Auvergne-Rhône-Alpes
- Department: Haute-Savoie
- Arrondissement: Annecy
- Canton: Annecy-4
- Intercommunality: CA Grand Annecy

Government
  - Mayor (2020–2026): Patrick Bosson
- Area^{1}: 9.11 km^{2} (3.52 sq mi)
- Highest elevation: 1,533 m (5,030 ft)
- Lowest elevation: 585 m (1,919 ft)
- Population (2023): 1,257
  - Density: 138/km^{2} (357/sq mi)
- Demonym: Quintalis / Quintalise
- Time zone: UTC+01:00 (CET)
  - Summer (DST): UTC+02:00 (CEST)
- INSEE/Postal code: 74219 /74600
- ^{1} French Land Register data, which excludes lakes, ponds, glaciers > 1 km^{2} (0.386 sq mi or 247 acres) and river estuaries.

Quintal (French pronunciation: [kɛ̃tal]; Arpitan: Kintâ) is a commune in the Haute-Savoie department in the Auvergne-Rhône-Alpes region in south-eastern France.

On the south-south-east side of the commune sits the Semnoz mountain. The village is on the border between the Arrondissement of Annecy and the Albanais, which it was historically a part of. It borders the communes of Sevrier, Saint-Jorioz, Viuz-la-Chiésaz and Seynod (the latter being a former commune merged with Annecy).

It is a rural community with an economy focused on agriculture and local artisanship, with most inhabitants working throughout the Annecy's agglomération, the economic growth of Annecy is a driving factor for the demography of the commune of Quintal.

== History ==
In roman times the village hosted a miliarium marking the fifth roman mile away from the nearby city of Annecy, named "Boutae" at the time, which gave it its name "quintilius", latin for "fifth". The place is found to be referred to as « Cura de Quintaz » around 1344.

The seigneury of Quintal belonged from the 14th century (c. 1302) until the 17th century to the Diocese of Puy-en-Velay. On 23 September 1641, Noble Jean-François Garnerin, State Councilor at the Senate of the Duchy of Savoy, General Controller of the finances of the Duchy of Savoy, acquired the seigneury.

In the spring of the year 1796, in order to equip the Church of the Visitation with a bell that had been destroyed during the Reign of Terror, Antoine Paccard, elected mayor in 1795, called upon an itinerant bell founder, Jean Baptiste Pitton, originally from Carouge. The new bell bore the inscription "If I survive the Terror, it is to announce happiness". It was finally installed with the establishment of the Concordat. Antoine Paccard founded the Paccard foundry, still active to this day, originally for the purpose of this bell.

== See also ==
- Communes of the Haute-Savoie department
