= Épagny =

Épagny may refer to the following places in France:

- Épagny, Aisne, a commune in the department of Aisne
- Épagny, Côte-d'Or, a commune in the department of Côte-d'Or
- Épagny, Haute-Savoie, a commune in the department of Haute-Savoie
