= La Chapelle-Saint-Maurice =

- Commune
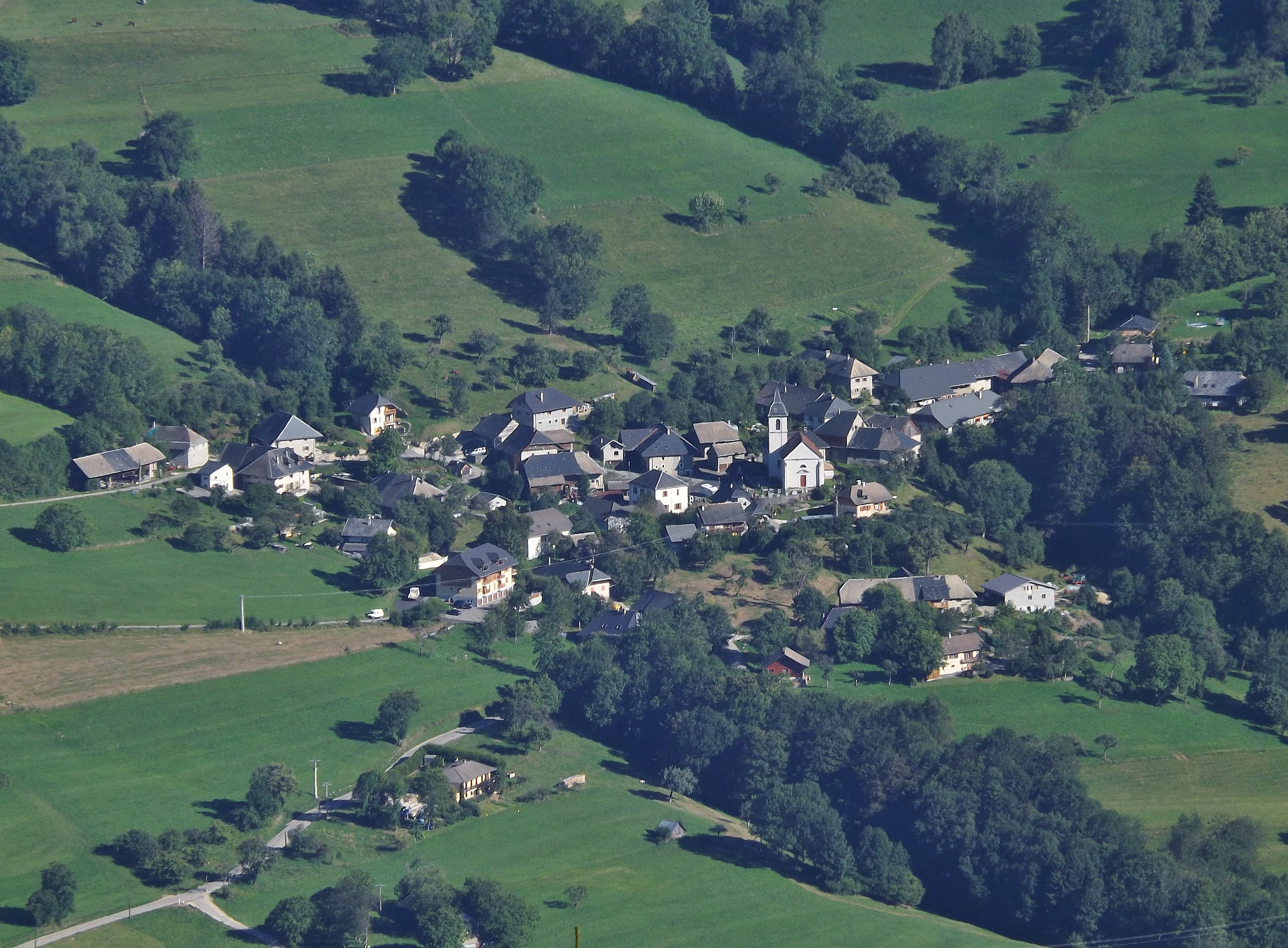
- La Chapelle-Saint-Maurice seen from Semnoz
- Location of La Chapelle-Saint-Maurice
- Location within France Location within Auvergne-Rhône-Alpes
- Coordinates: 45°46′46″N 6°09′03″E
- Country: France
- Region: Auvergne-Rhône-Alpes
- Department: Haute-Savoie
- Arrondissement: Annecy
- Canton: Annecy-4
- Intercommunality: CA Grand Annecy

Government
  - Mayor (2020–2026): Michel Mugnier-Pollet
- Area^{1}: 6.48 km^{2} (2.50 sq mi)
- Highest elevation: 1,760 m (5,770 ft)
- Lowest elevation: 754 m (2,474 ft)
- Population (2023): 121
  - Density: 18.7/km^{2} (48.4/sq mi)
- Demonym: Chapelains
- Time zone: UTC+01:00 (CET)
  - Summer (DST): UTC+02:00 (CEST)
- INSEE/Postal code: 74060 /74410
- ^{1} French Land Register data, which excludes lakes, ponds, glaciers > 1 km^{2} (0.386 sq mi or 247 acres) and river estuaries.

La Chapelle-Saint-Maurice (French: [la ʃapɛl sɛ̃ mɔʁis]; Arpitan: La Shapala-San-Meuri) is a commune in the Haute-Savoie department in the Auvergne-Rhône-Alpes region in south-eastern France.

== See also ==
- Communes of the Haute-Savoie department
