= Saint-Eustache =

Saint-Eustache may refer to:

- Eustace of Luxeuil (c. 560 – c. 629), succeeded Saint Columbanus as the 2nd abbot of Luxeuil in Burgundy
- Saint Eustace, a Christian martyr and soldier saint, who legend places in 2nd-century Italy, patron saint of hunters and firefighters
- Saint-Eustache, Quebec, a city in western Quebec, Canada
- Saint-Eustache, Haute-Savoie, a commune in France
- Saint-Eustache, Paris, a church in Paris, France
- Sint Eustatius, one of the islands of the Caribbean Netherlands
