= Canton of Annecy-4 =

Coordinates: 45.8331°N 6.1669°E

Annecy-4
- Canton
- Interactive map of Annecy-4
- Country: France
- Region: Auvergne-Rhône-Alpes
- Department: Haute-Savoie
- No. of communes: {{{nbcomm}}}

Government
  - Representatives (2021–2028): Magali Mugnier; Lionel Tardy
- Area: 114.20 km^{2} (44.09 sq mi)
- Population (2023): 56,041
  - Density: 490.73/km^{2} (1,271.0/sq mi)
- INSEE code: 74 16

The canton of Annecy-4 (before March 2020: canton of Seynod) is an administrative division in Eastern France. Since the French canton reorganisation which came into effect in March 2015, the communes of the canton of Annecy-4 are:

- Annecy (partly: Cran-Gevrier and Seynod)
- La Chapelle-Saint-Maurice
- Chavanod
- Duingt
- Entrevernes
- Leschaux
- Montagny-les-Lanches
- Quintal
- Saint-Eustache
- Saint-Jorioz
