= Épagny Metz-Tessy =

- Commune
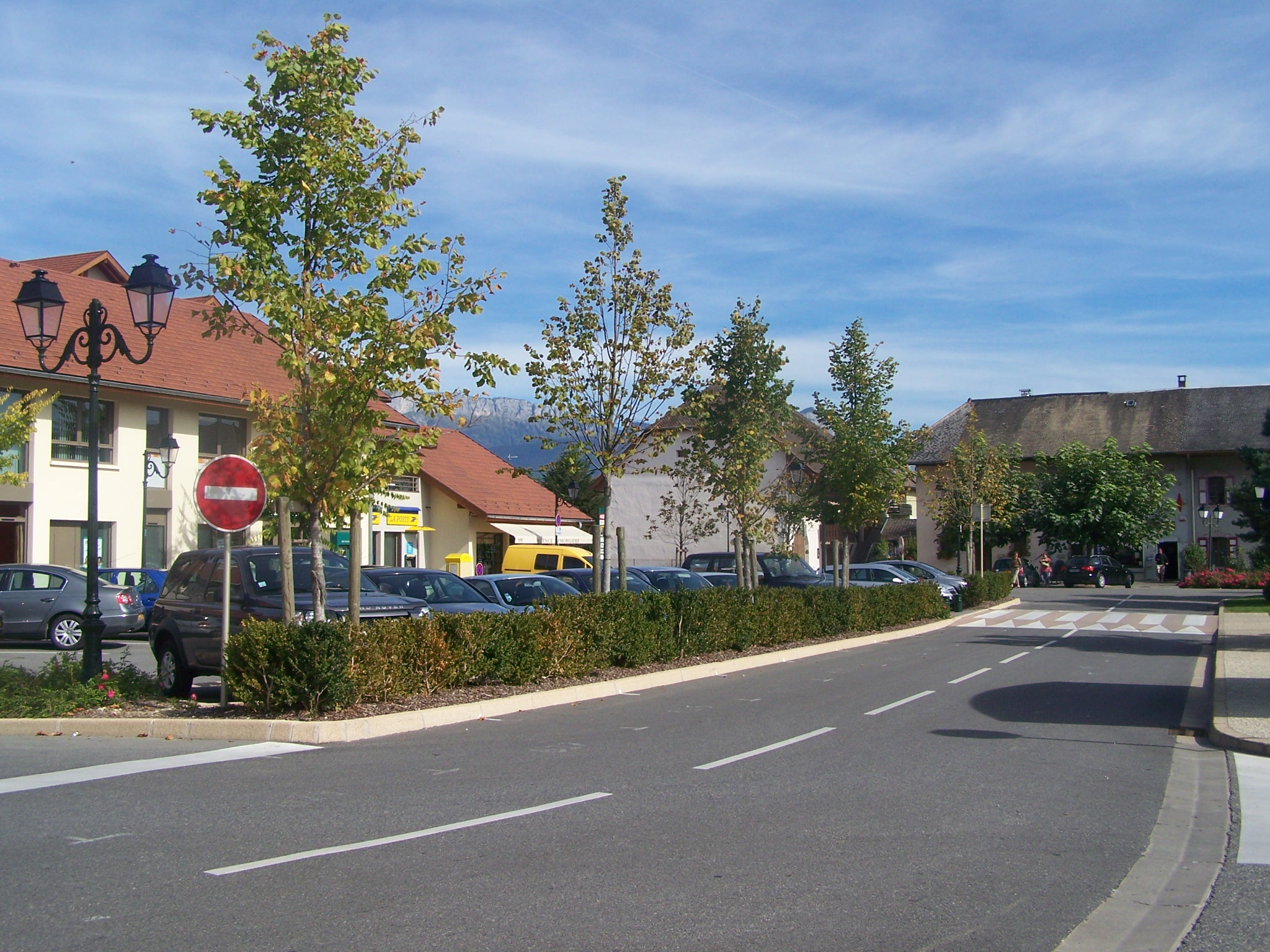
- A view within Épagny
- Location of Épagny Metz-Tessy
- Location within France Location within Auvergne-Rhône-Alpes
- Coordinates: 45°56′17″N 6°05′28″E
- Country: France
- Region: Auvergne-Rhône-Alpes
- Department: Haute-Savoie
- Arrondissement: Annecy
- Canton: Annecy-3
- Intercommunality: CA Grand Annecy

Government
  - Mayor (2020–2026): Roland Daviet
- Area^{1}: 12.06 km^{2} (4.66 sq mi)
- Population (2023): 8,925
  - Density: 740.0/km^{2} (1,917/sq mi)
- Time zone: UTC+01:00 (CET)
  - Summer (DST): UTC+02:00 (CEST)
- INSEE/Postal code: 74112 /74330
- ^{1} French Land Register data, which excludes lakes, ponds, glaciers > 1 km^{2} (0.386 sq mi or 247 acres) and river estuaries.

Épagny Metz-Tessy (French pronunciation: [epaɲi mɛtɛsi]) is a commune in the Haute-Savoie department of southeastern France. The municipality was established on 1 January 2016 and consists of the former communes of Épagny and Metz-Tessy. It is part of the urban area of Annecy.

== Population ==
Population data refer to the area corresponding with the commune as of January 2025.

Historical population
Year	Pop.	±% p.a.
1968	1,078	—
1975	1,614	+5.94%
1982	2,246	+4.83%
1990	3,472	+5.60%
1999	5,242	+4.68%
2007	6,240	+2.20%
2012	6,978	+2.26%
2017	7,824	+2.32%
2023	8,925	+2.22%
Source: INSEE

== See also ==
- Communes of the Haute-Savoie department
