= Entrevernes =

- Commune
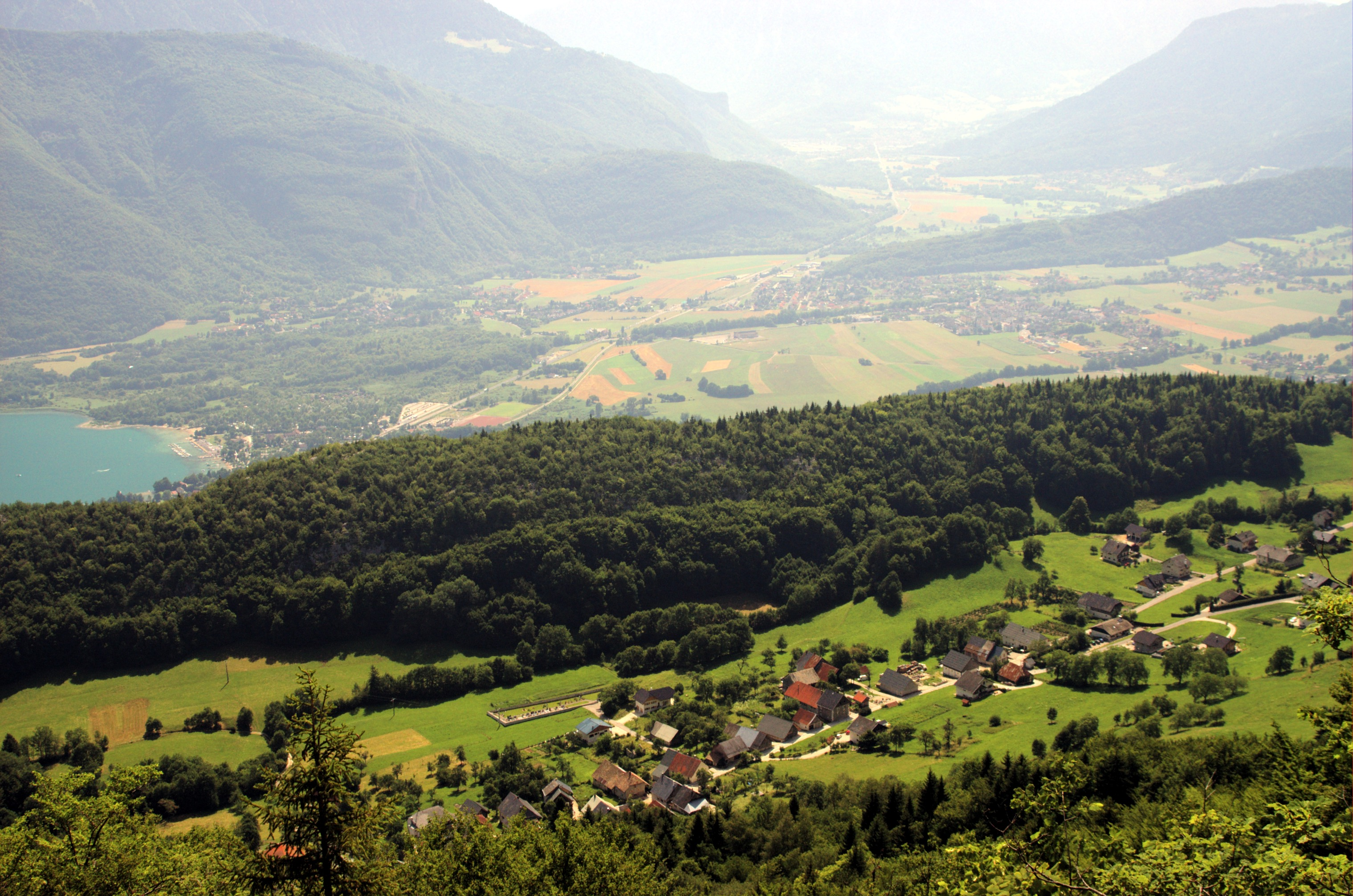
- A general view of Entrevernes and the valley
- Location of Entrevernes
- Location within France Location within Auvergne-Rhône-Alpes
- Coordinates: 45°47′46″N 6°11′21″E
- Country: France
- Region: Auvergne-Rhône-Alpes
- Department: Haute-Savoie
- Arrondissement: Annecy
- Canton: Annecy-4
- Intercommunality: CA Grand Annecy

Government
  - Mayor (2023–2026): Karine Leroy
- Area^{1}: 8.31 km^{2} (3.21 sq mi)
- Highest elevation: 1,775 m (5,823 ft)
- Lowest elevation: 729 m (2,392 ft)
- Population (2023): 191
  - Density: 23.0/km^{2} (59.5/sq mi)
- Demonym: Entrevernains
- Time zone: UTC+01:00 (CET)
  - Summer (DST): UTC+02:00 (CEST)
- INSEE/Postal code: 74111 /74410
- ^{1} French Land Register data, which excludes lakes, ponds, glaciers > 1 km^{2} (0.386 sq mi or 247 acres) and river estuaries.

Entrevernes (French pronunciation: [ɑ̃tʁəvɛʁn]; Arpitan: Êtrèvêrne) is a commune in the Haute-Savoie department and Auvergne-Rhône-Alpes region of eastern France.

== See also ==
- Communes of the Haute-Savoie department
