= Duingt =

Duingt Douin (Savoyard)
- Commune
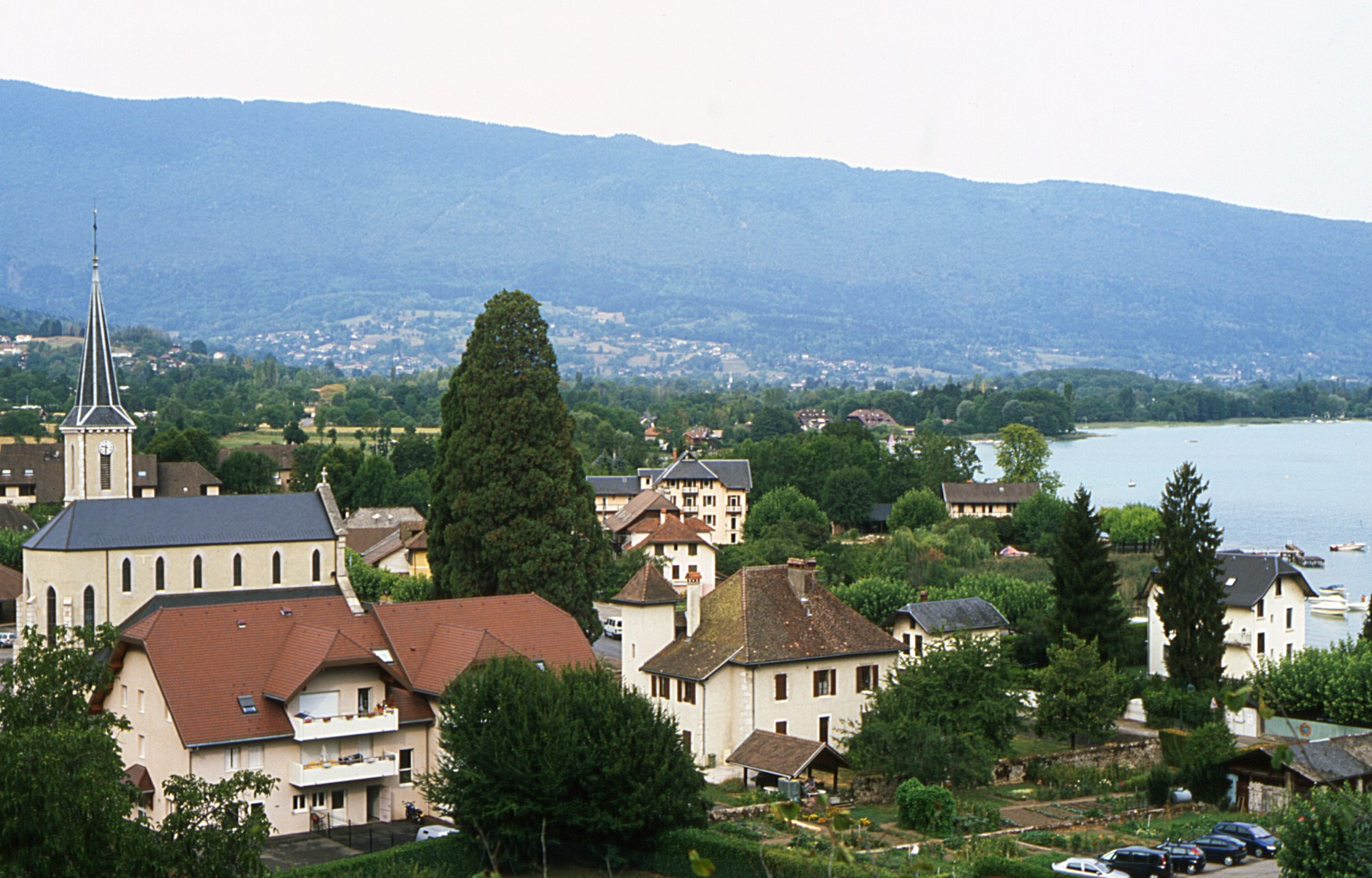
- View of Duingt from Taillefer

- Coat of arms
- Location of Duingt
- Location within France Location within Auvergne-Rhône-Alpes
- Coordinates: 45°49′44″N 6°12′12″E
- Country: France
- Region: Auvergne-Rhône-Alpes
- Department: Haute-Savoie
- Arrondissement: Annecy
- Canton: Annecy-4
- Intercommunality: CA Grand Annecy

Government
  - Mayor (2020–2026): Marc Rollin
- Area^{1}: 4.42 km^{2} (1.71 sq mi)
- Highest elevation: 1,202 m (3,944 ft)
- Lowest elevation: 442 m (1,450 ft)
- Population (2023): 1,078
  - Density: 244/km^{2} (632/sq mi)
- Demonym: Dunois / Dunoises
- Time zone: UTC+01:00 (CET)
  - Summer (DST): UTC+02:00 (CEST)
- INSEE/Postal code: 74108 /74410
- ^{1} French Land Register data, which excludes lakes, ponds, glaciers > 1 km^{2} (0.386 sq mi or 247 acres) and river estuaries.

Duingt (French pronunciation: [dwɛ̃]; Savoyard: Douin) is a commune in the Haute-Savoie department in the Auvergne-Rhône-Alpes region in south-eastern France.

The history of the place starts in the Bronze Age (from 1400 to 700 BC) where the first habitats for human settlements were evolved. It was in this epoch where the hallmark of Duingt, the island called the island of Roselet, has been evolved from the lake. The first prehistoric objects such as pieces made of ceramic, bracelets and rings which are exhibited at the museum of Annecy have been found in 1856. Further pieces which relate to prehistoric settlement have been exposed in 1860.

== Toponymy ==
The name of the commune and village is attested in the 12th century in the forms Duig, recorded in 1198 and interpreted as Duing, and Duginum. During the following two centuries, the forms Duin, notably in 1225, Duginno, and Cura de Duyng, in 1344, are also found. The parish is mentioned in the cartulary of Talloires Abbey from the late 12th or early 13th century under the forms Dugnensis and Duniensis.

The name later appears as Duygnum in the 14th century, Duing-Dhérée in the 18th century, when associated with the second village, and Duing during the period of French annexation between 1793 and 1801.

In French, the final letters g and t are not pronounced. The older form Duin was pronounced with a sound close to French ouin. According to the linguist Théophile Perrenot, cited by Henry Suter, the name may be of Burgundian origin and derive from *Dugingo, itself connected with the personal name Dugo and the Germanic root *dugan, meaning “to be worth” or “to be useful”. Another interpretation connects duin with the idea of a mound or dune, recalling the rocky promontory at the centre of the village, where the castle on the Roc was built.

The municipal website gives another possible origin from the Celtic word don, meaning a fortified mound, in connection with the presence of a Roman and later feudal fortified site. The name may also be related to the Latin personal name Duinus, associated with the lords of Duin of Châteauvieux.

The name of the village of Dhéré, also written Dhérée or d'Héré, may come from the Savoyard word derè, meaning “behind”, probably derived from darray, with the same meaning. In Arpitan, the name of the commune is written Douin according to the Conflans orthography.

== History ==
=== Middle Ages ===
In the Middle Ages, Duingt belonged to the County of Geneva, more specifically to the pagus minor Albanensis, corresponding to the Albanais region. The lords of Duin or Duyn appear in the 11th century as lords of Duin and vassals of the counts of Geneva. The family dominated the region until its disappearance in the 16th century. A cadet branch held the title of viscount of Tarentaise and Val d'Isère, while their closest vassals were the lords of Dhéré.

== Sights ==
The church of Duingt was built in the 19th century in Neo-Gothic style. Duingt has two castles, but they can not be visited. The Château de Duingt (other names: Château de Châteauvieux or C. de Ruphy) is located on a small island connected by a causeway to the mainland. The original castle was built in the 11th century and got its present shape between the 17th and 19th centuries. The Château d'Héré, built in the 15th century, can be found in Dhéré. In the center of Duingt there are still a number of houses in the typical Savoyard style of the 17th and 18th centuries.

== See also ==
- Communes of the Haute-Savoie department

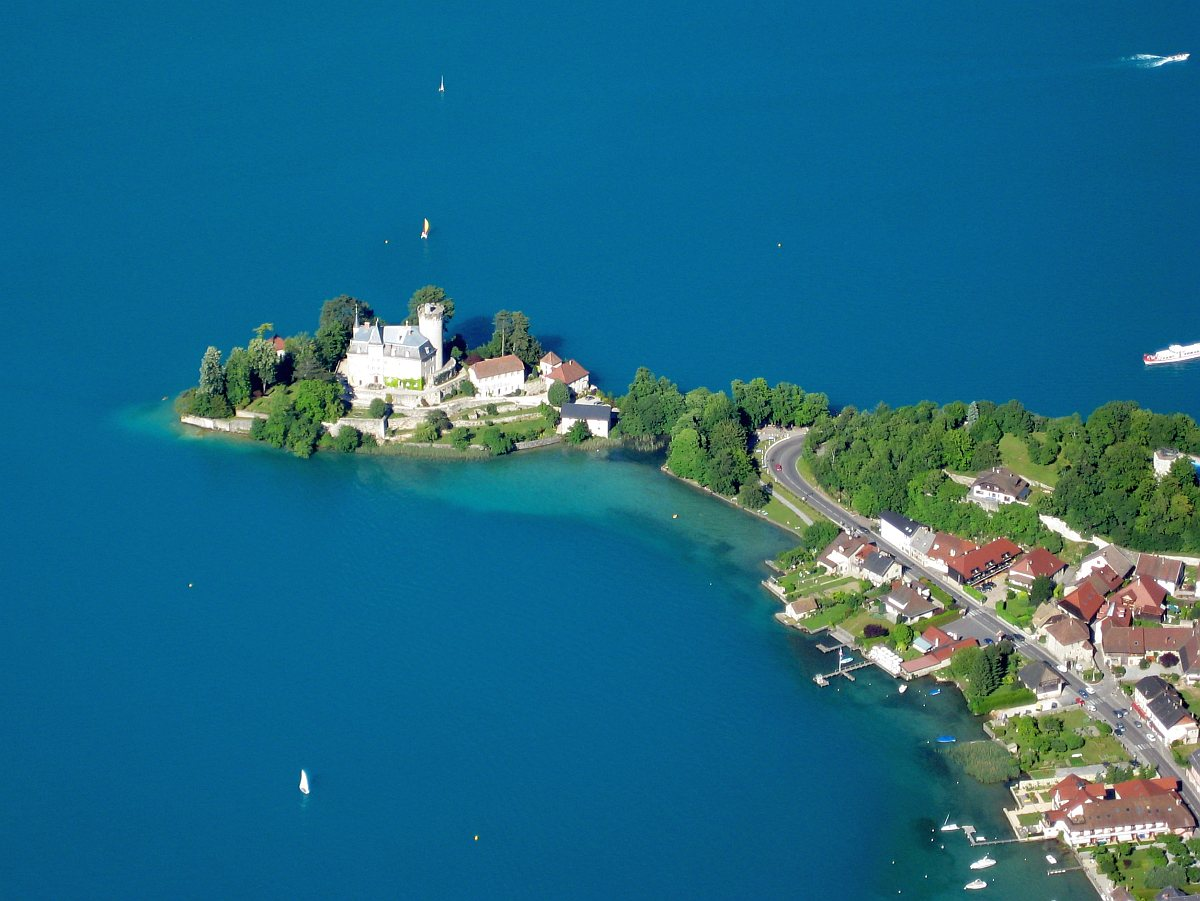
Château de Duingt
