= Viuz-la-Chiésaz =

Viuz-la-Chiésaz Viu (Savoyard)
- Commune
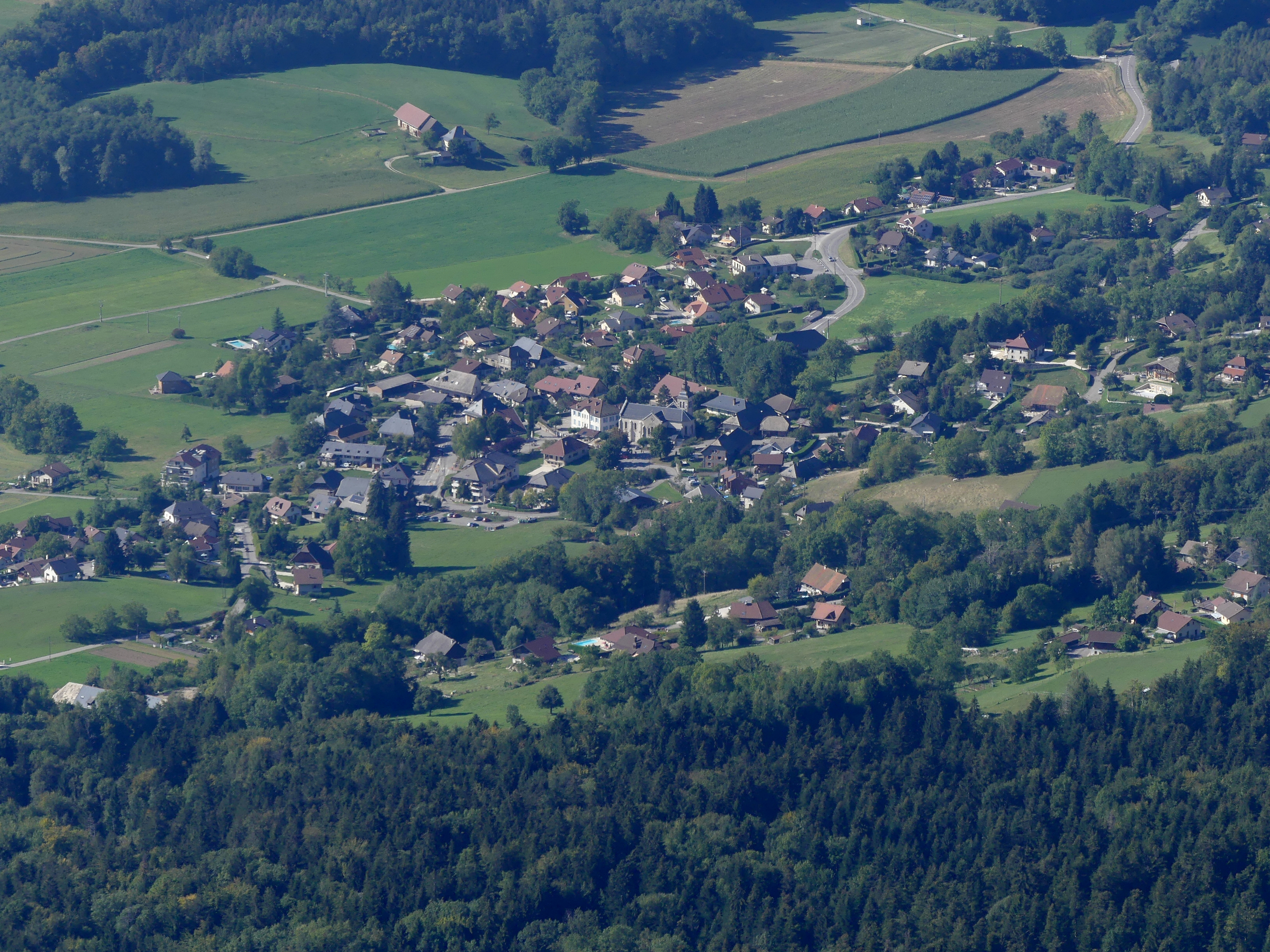
- The centre of Viuz-la-Chiésaz from Semnoz.
- Location of Viuz-la-Chiésaz
- Location within France Location within Auvergne-Rhône-Alpes
- Coordinates: 45°48′42″N 6°03′45″E
- Country: France
- Region: Auvergne-Rhône-Alpes
- Department: Haute-Savoie
- Arrondissement: Annecy
- Canton: Rumilly
- Intercommunality: Grand Annecy

Government
  - Mayor (2020–2026): François Lavigne-Delville
- Area^{1}: 13.91 km^{2} (5.37 sq mi)
- Elevation: 585 m (1,919 ft)
- Highest elevation: 1,702 m (5,584 ft)
- Lowest elevation: 440 m (1,440 ft)
- Population (2023): 1,351
  - Density: 97.12/km^{2} (251.6/sq mi)
- Demonym: Viulan(e)
- Time zone: UTC+01:00 (CET)
  - Summer (DST): UTC+02:00 (CEST)
- INSEE/Postal code: 74310 /74540
- ^{1} French Land Register data, which excludes lakes, ponds, glaciers > 1 km^{2} (0.386 sq mi or 247 acres) and river estuaries.

Viuz-la-Chiésaz (French pronunciation: [vjy la ʃjɛza]; Savoyard: Viu) is a commune in the Haute-Savoie department in the Auvergne-Rhône-Alpes region in south-eastern France.

== See also ==
- Communes of the Haute-Savoie department
