= Seynod =

Seynod Sénu (Savoyard)
- Part of Annecy
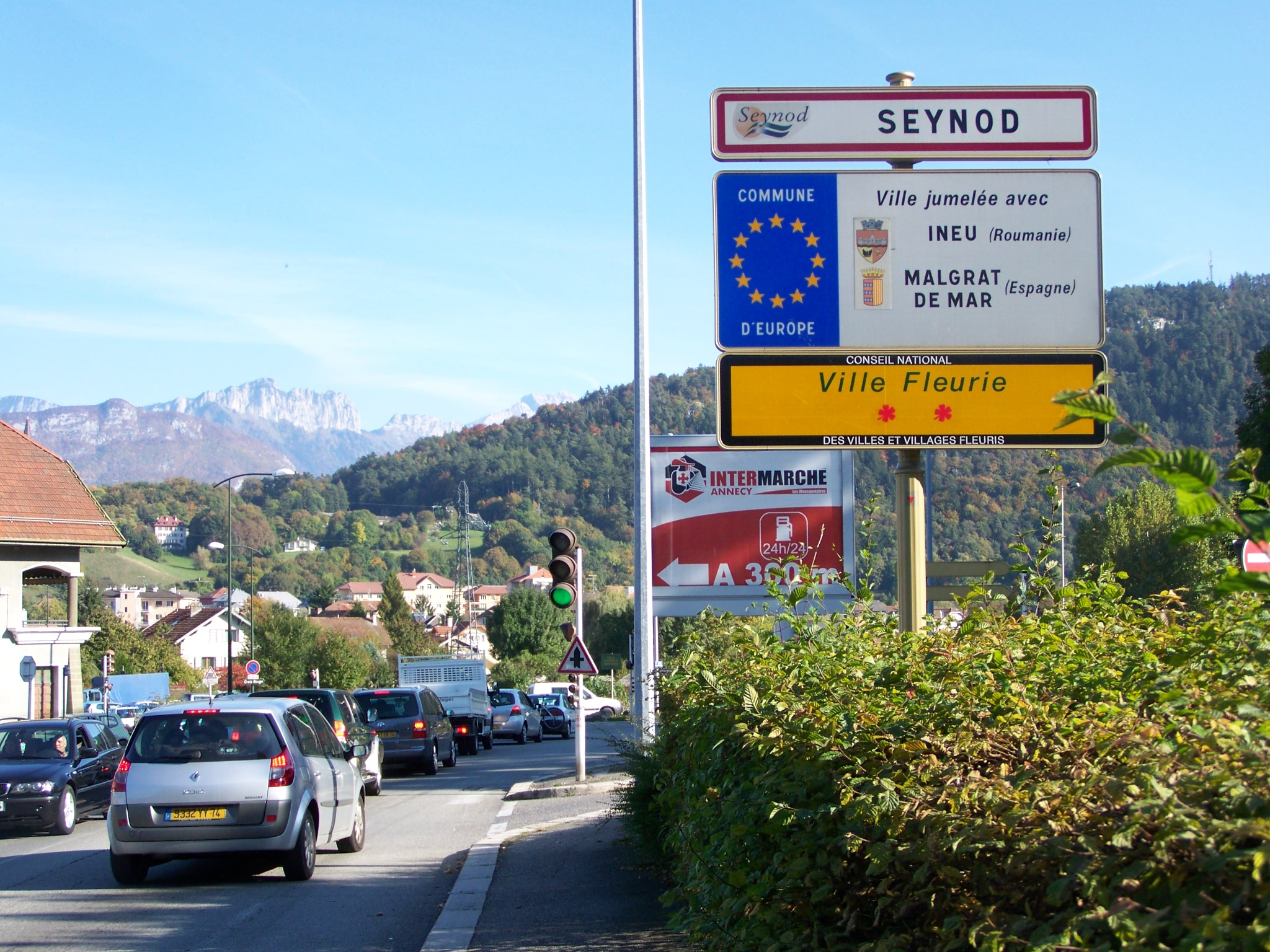
- The road into Seynod

- Coat of arms
- Location of Seynod
- Location within France Location within Auvergne-Rhône-Alpes
- Coordinates: 45°53′23″N 6°05′48″E
- Country: France
- Region: Auvergne-Rhône-Alpes
- Department: Haute-Savoie
- Arrondissement: Annecy
- Canton: Seynod
- Commune: Annecy
- Area^{1}: 19.17 km^{2} (7.40 sq mi)
- Highest elevation: 1,024 m (3,360 ft)
- Lowest elevation: 446 m (1,463 ft)
- Population (2022): 23,574
  - Density: 1,230/km^{2} (3,185/sq mi)
- Time zone: UTC+01:00 (CET)
  - Summer (DST): UTC+02:00 (CEST)
- Postal code: 74600
- ^{1} French Land Register data, which excludes lakes, ponds, glaciers > 1 km^{2} (0.386 sq mi or 247 acres) and river estuaries.

Seynod (French pronunciation: [sɛno]; Savoyard: Sénu) is a former commune in the Haute-Savoie department in the Auvergne-Rhône-Alpes region in south-eastern France. On 1 January 2017, it was merged into the commune Annecy.

The inhabitants of Seynod are called Seynodiens.

== Administration ==
The town of Seynod is the seat of a canton which includes twelve communes. It is part of the Communauté d'agglomération du Grand Annecy.

== Geography ==
To the south-southeast of the commune is the massif of Semnoz.

== Landmarks ==
- Châteauvieux
- Château de Périaz
- Église Saint-Maurice du XVIe siècle, remaniée XVIIe et XIXe.

== Sports ==
The town is equipped with an auditorium and a summer/winter water sports complex. There is also a skate-park.

== Twin towns ==
The town of Seynod was formally twinned with the town of Ineu in Romania September 26, 1999. A sponsorship has existed since 1989.

In 2002, the municipality proposed to be twinned with the town of Malgrat de Mar in Catalonia.

== Festivals ==
Every first Sunday of September, the association Les Amis du Vieux Seynod organise the fête du Vieux Seynod, the goal of which is to recall the rural traditions and craftsmanship of the inhabitants.

== See also ==
- Communes of the Haute-Savoie department
