= Argonay =

Argonay Argoné (Savoyard)
- Commune
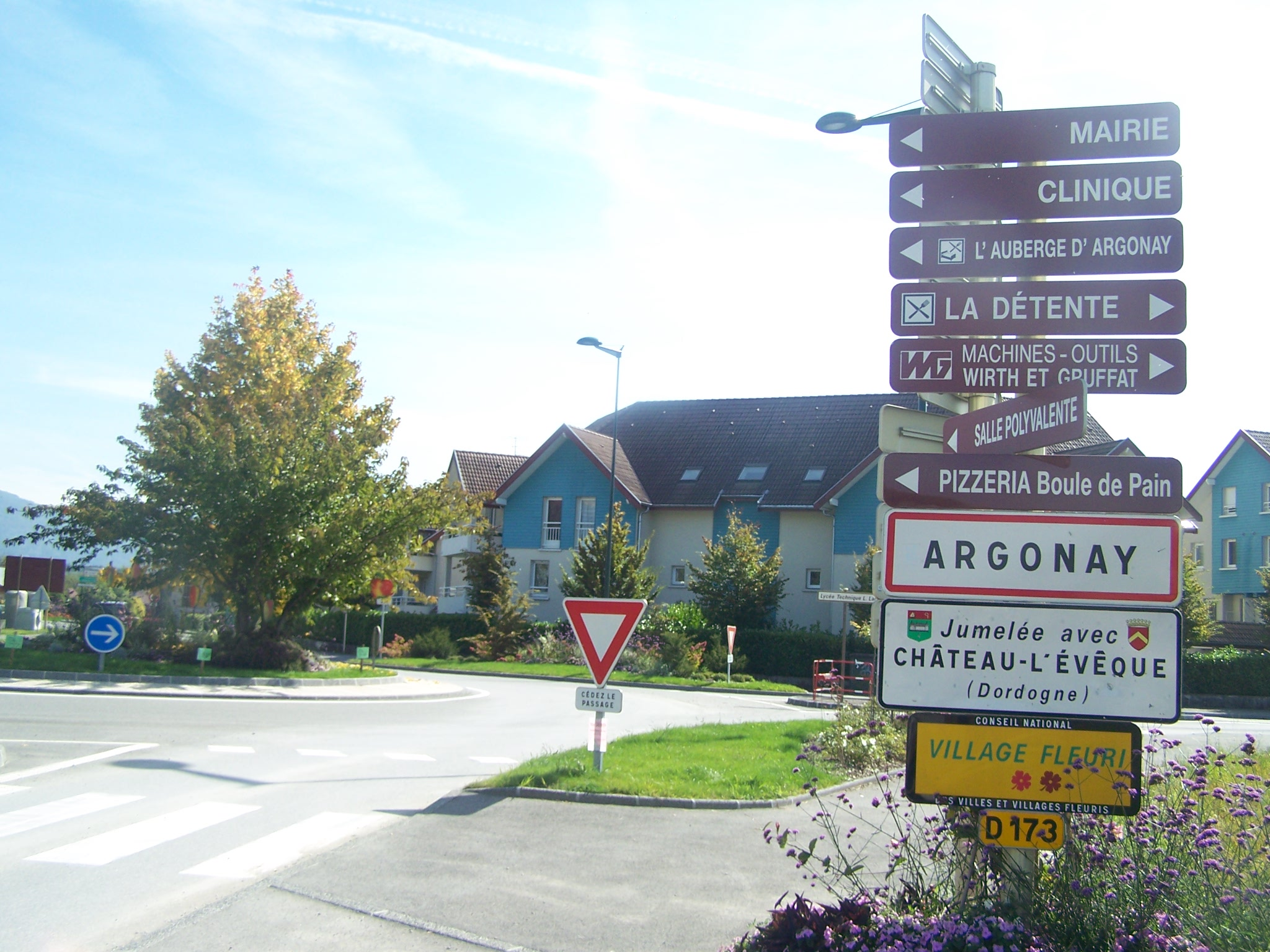
- The main road into Argonay

- Coat of arms
- Location of Argonay
- Location within France Location within Auvergne-Rhône-Alpes
- Coordinates: 45°56′46″N 6°08′28″E
- Country: France
- Region: Auvergne-Rhône-Alpes
- Department: Haute-Savoie
- Arrondissement: Annecy
- Canton: Annecy-3
- Intercommunality: CA Grand Annecy

Government
  - Mayor (2020–2026): Gilles François
- Area^{1}: 5.16 km^{2} (1.99 sq mi)
- Highest elevation: 738 m (2,421 ft)
- Lowest elevation: 450 m (1,480 ft)
- Population (2023): 3,807
  - Density: 738/km^{2} (1,910/sq mi)
- Time zone: UTC+01:00 (CET)
  - Summer (DST): UTC+02:00 (CEST)
- INSEE/Postal code: 74019 /74370
- ^{1} French Land Register data, which excludes lakes, ponds, glaciers > 1 km^{2} (0.386 sq mi or 247 acres) and river estuaries.

Argonay (French pronunciation: [aʁɡɔnɛ]; Savoyard: Argoné) is a commune in the Haute-Savoie department in the Auvergne-Rhône-Alpes region in south-eastern France. It is part of the urban area of Annecy.

== Geography ==
The Fier forms most of the commune's southern border.

== Population ==
Historical population
Year	Pop.	±% p.a.
1968	751	—
1975	968	+3.69%
1982	1,054	+1.22%
1990	1,520	+4.68%
1999	1,886	+2.43%
2007	2,193	+1.90%
2012	2,626	+3.67%
2017	3,025	+2.87%
2023	3,807	+3.91%
Source: INSEE

== See also ==
- Communes of the Haute-Savoie department
