= Montagny-les-Lanches =

- Commune
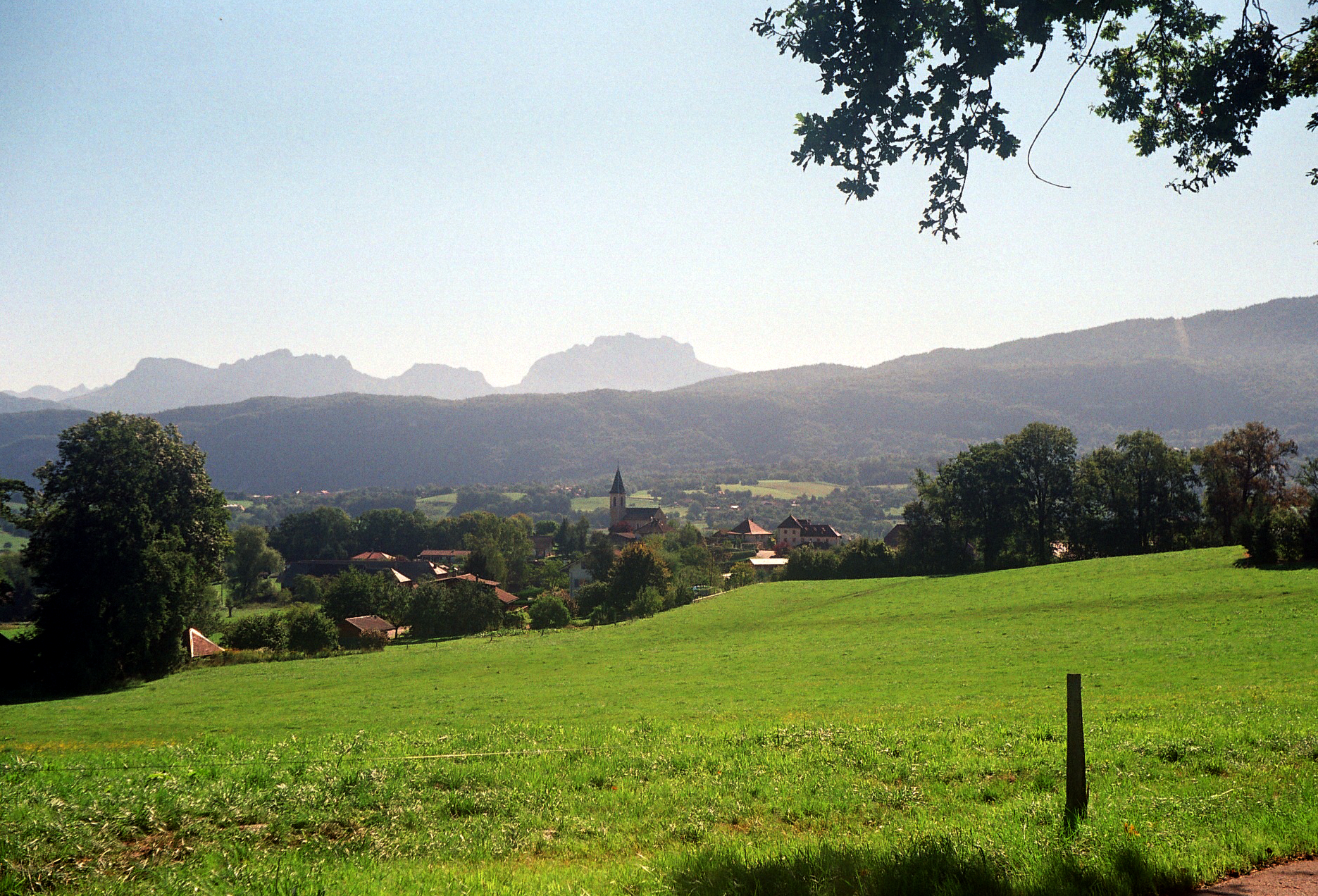
- A general view of Montagny
- Location of Montagny-les-Lanches
- Location within France Location within Auvergne-Rhône-Alpes
- Coordinates: 45°51′44″N 6°02′44″E
- Country: France
- Region: Auvergne-Rhône-Alpes
- Department: Haute-Savoie
- Arrondissement: Annecy
- Canton: Annecy-4
- Intercommunality: CA Grand Annecy

Government
  - Mayor (2020–2026): Monique Pimonow
- Area^{1}: 4.38 km^{2} (1.69 sq mi)
- Highest elevation: 729 m (2,392 ft)
- Lowest elevation: 525 m (1,722 ft)
- Population (2023): 830
  - Density: 190/km^{2} (490/sq mi)
- Time zone: UTC+01:00 (CET)
  - Summer (DST): UTC+02:00 (CEST)
- INSEE/Postal code: 74186 /74600
- ^{1} French Land Register data, which excludes lakes, ponds, glaciers > 1 km^{2} (0.386 sq mi or 247 acres) and river estuaries.

Montagny-les-Lanches (French pronunciation: [mɔ̃taɲi le lɑ̃ʃ]; Arpitan: Montanyi-lé-Lanshe) is a commune in the Haute-Savoie department in the Auvergne-Rhône-Alpes region in south-eastern France.

== See also ==
- Communes of the Haute-Savoie department
