= Chavanod =

- Commune
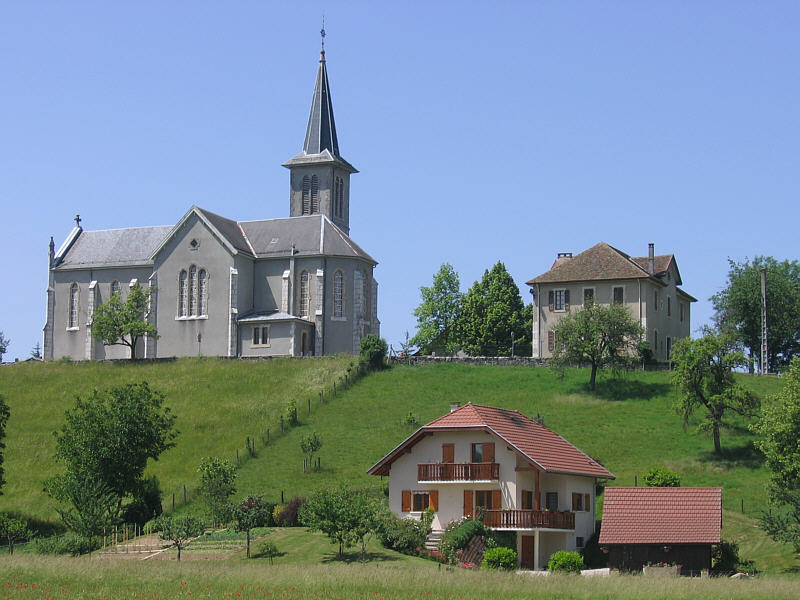
- The church in Chavanod
- Location of Chavanod
- Location within France Location within Auvergne-Rhône-Alpes
- Coordinates: 45°53′27″N 6°02′25″E
- Country: France
- Region: Auvergne-Rhône-Alpes
- Department: Haute-Savoie
- Arrondissement: Annecy
- Canton: Annecy-4
- Intercommunality: CA Grand Annecy

Government
  - Mayor (2020–2026): Franck Bogey
- Area^{1}: 13.36 km^{2} (5.16 sq mi)
- Highest elevation: 624 m (2,047 ft)
- Lowest elevation: 356 m (1,168 ft)
- Population (2023): 3,135
  - Density: 234.7/km^{2} (607.8/sq mi)
- Time zone: UTC+01:00 (CET)
  - Summer (DST): UTC+02:00 (CEST)
- INSEE/Postal code: 74067 /74650
- ^{1} French Land Register data, which excludes lakes, ponds, glaciers > 1 km^{2} (0.386 sq mi or 247 acres) and river estuaries.

Chavanod (French pronunciation: [ʃavano]; Arpitan: Chavanôd) is a commune in the Haute-Savoie department and Auvergne-Rhône-Alpes region of eastern France. It is part of the urban area of Annecy.

== Geography ==
The river Fier forms parts of the commune's northern border.

== Population ==
Historical population
Year	Pop.	±% p.a.
1968	664	—
1975	1,019	+6.31%
1982	1,254	+3.01%
1990	1,489	+2.17%
1999	1,883	+2.64%
2007	2,167	+1.77%
2012	2,318	+1.36%
2017	2,643	+2.66%
2023	3,135	+2.89%
Source: INSEE

== See also ==
- Communes of the Haute-Savoie department
