= Leschaux =

- Commune
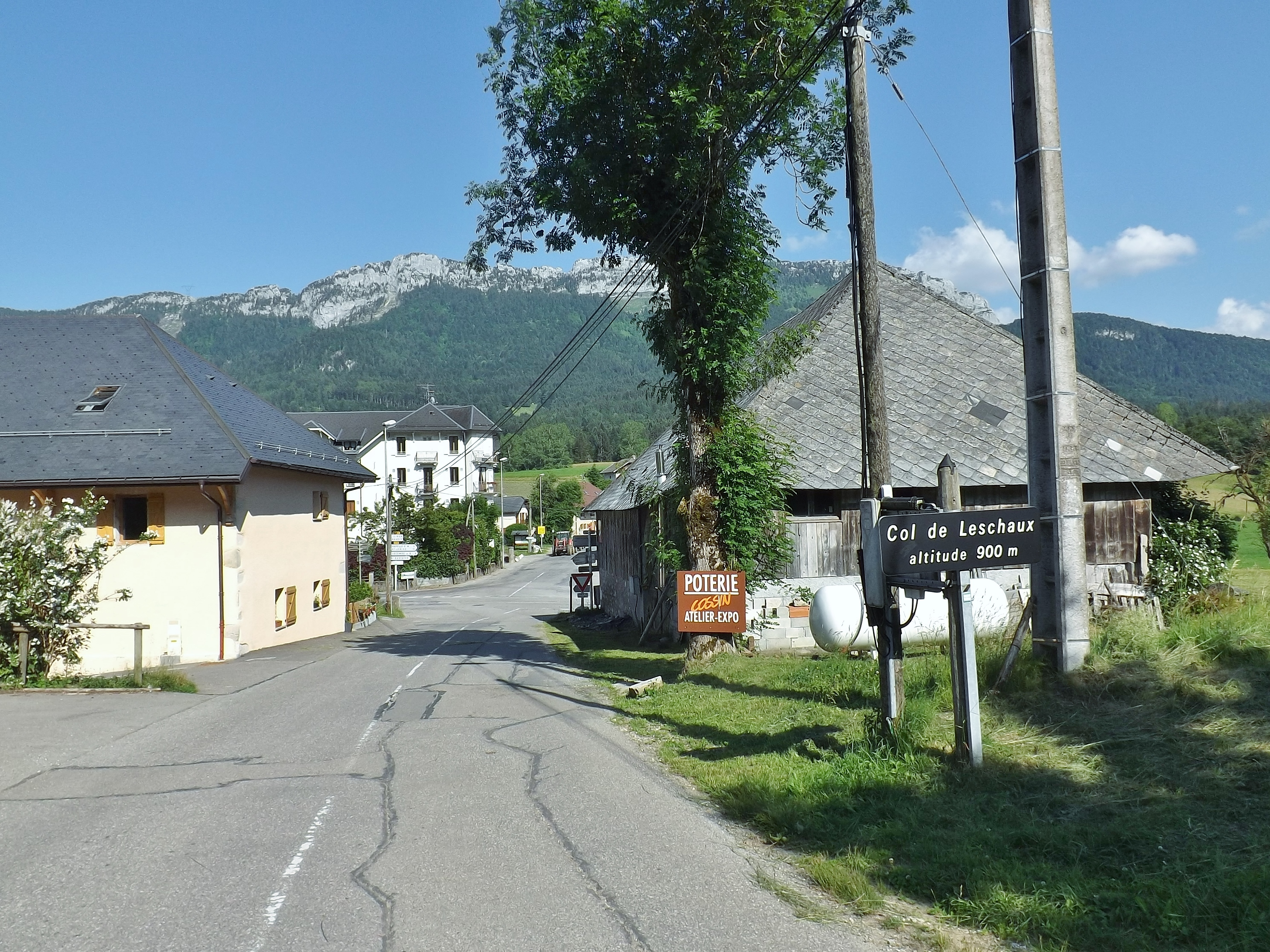
- The Col de Leschaux 900 m (3,000 ft)
- Location of Leschaux
- Location within France Location within Auvergne-Rhône-Alpes
- Coordinates: 45°46′25″N 6°07′36″E
- Country: France
- Region: Auvergne-Rhône-Alpes
- Department: Haute-Savoie
- Arrondissement: Annecy
- Canton: Annecy-4
- Intercommunality: CA Grand Annecy

Government
  - Mayor (2020–2026): Catherine Bouvier
- Area^{1}: 12.52 km^{2} (4.83 sq mi)
- Highest elevation: 1,666 m (5,466 ft)
- Lowest elevation: 756 m (2,480 ft)
- Population (2023): 328
  - Density: 26.2/km^{2} (67.9/sq mi)
- Demonym: Leschaliens
- Time zone: UTC+01:00 (CET)
  - Summer (DST): UTC+02:00 (CEST)
- INSEE/Postal code: 74148 /74320
- ^{1} French Land Register data, which excludes lakes, ponds, glaciers > 1 km^{2} (0.386 sq mi or 247 acres) and river estuaries.

Leschaux (French pronunciation: [leʃo]; Arpitan: Léshô) is a commune in the Haute-Savoie department in the Auvergne-Rhône-Alpes region in south-eastern France.

== See also ==
- Communes of the Haute-Savoie department
