= Metz-Tessy =

Commune in Haute-Savoie, France

- Part of Épagny-Metz-Tessy
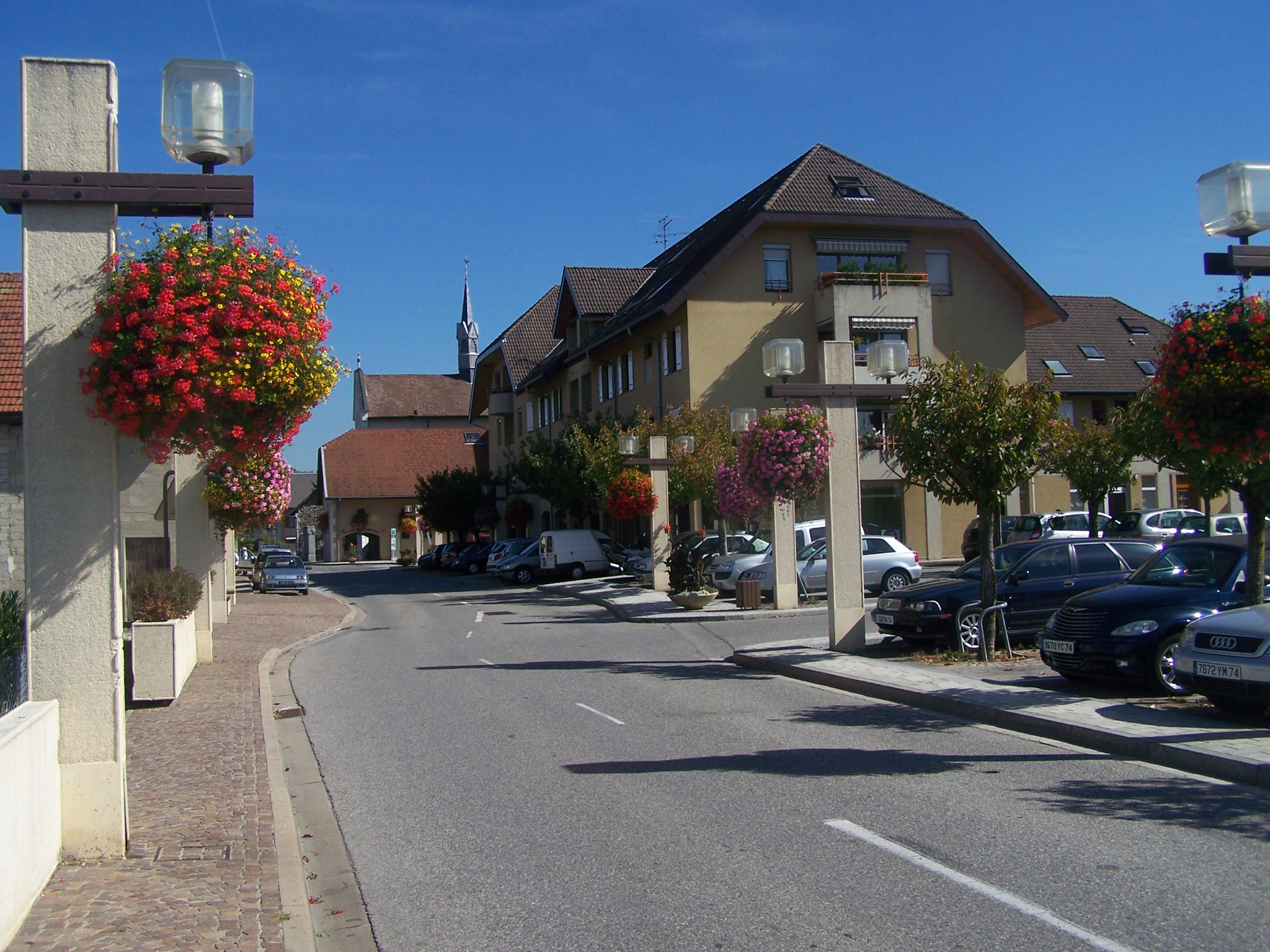
- Metz-Tessy city center

- Coat of arms
- Location of Metz-Tessy
- Location within France Location within Auvergne-Rhône-Alpes
- Coordinates: 45°56′29″N 6°06′26″E
- Country: France
- Region: Auvergne-Rhône-Alpes
- Department: Haute-Savoie
- Arrondissement: Annecy
- Canton: Annecy-le-Vieux
- Commune: Épagny-Metz-Tessy
- Area^{1}: 5.29 km^{2} (2.04 sq mi)
- Highest elevation: 708 m (2,323 ft)
- Lowest elevation: 423 m (1,388 ft)
- Population (2013): 3,051
  - Density: 577/km^{2} (1,490/sq mi)
- Time zone: UTC+01:00 (CET)
  - Summer (DST): UTC+02:00 (CEST)
- Postal code: 74370
- ^{1} French Land Register data, which excludes lakes, ponds, glaciers > 1 km^{2} (0.386 sq mi or 247 acres) and river estuaries.

Metz-Tessy (French pronunciation: [mɛtɛsi]; Arpitan: Mèznyi) is a former commune in the Haute-Savoie department in the Auvergne-Rhône-Alpes region in south-eastern France. On 1 January 2016, it was merged into the new commune of Épagny Metz-Tessy.

== Geography ==
The Fier forms part of the commune's south-eastern border.

== See also ==
- Communes of the Haute-Savoie department
