= Veyrier-du-Lac =

- Commune
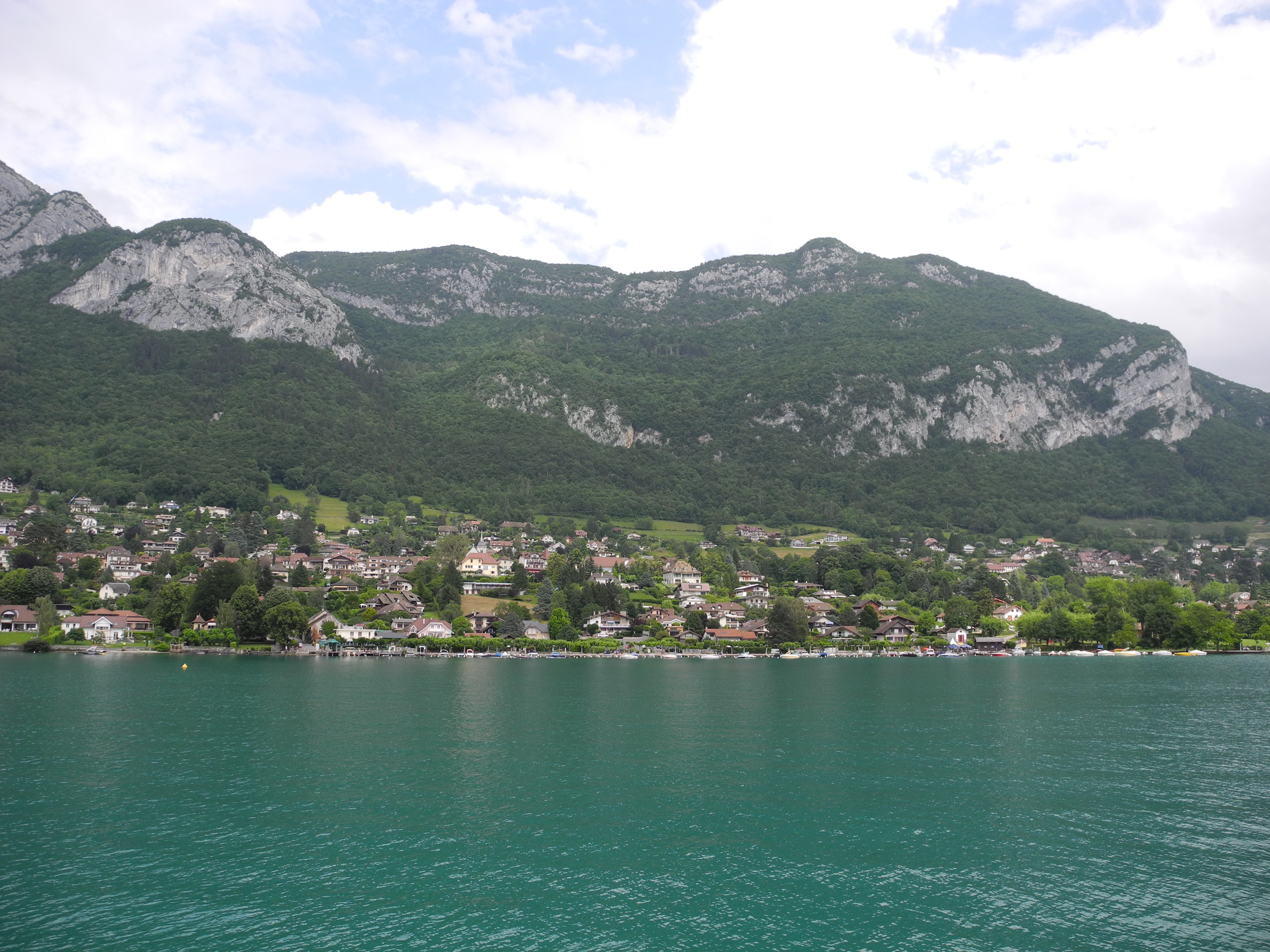
- Veyrier-du-Lac seen from Lake Annecy

- Coat of arms
- Location of Veyrier-du-Lac
- Location within France Location within Auvergne-Rhône-Alpes
- Coordinates: 45°52′56″N 6°10′41″E
- Country: France
- Region: Auvergne-Rhône-Alpes
- Department: Haute-Savoie
- Arrondissement: Annecy
- Canton: Faverges
- Intercommunality: CA Grand Annecy

Government
  - Mayor (2021–2026): Vanessa Bruno
- Area^{1}: 8.21 km^{2} (3.17 sq mi)
- Elevation: 500 m (1,600 ft)
- Highest elevation: 1,291 m (4,236 ft)
- Lowest elevation: 441 m (1,447 ft)
- Population (2023): 2,320
  - Density: 283/km^{2} (732/sq mi)
- Demonym: Veyrolain
- Time zone: UTC+01:00 (CET)
  - Summer (DST): UTC+02:00 (CEST)
- INSEE/Postal code: 74299 /74290
- ^{1} French Land Register data, which excludes lakes, ponds, glaciers > 1 km^{2} (0.386 sq mi or 247 acres) and river estuaries.

Veyrier-du-Lac (French pronunciation: [veʁje dy lak], literally Veyrier of the Lake) is a commune in the Haute-Savoie department in the Auvergne-Rhône-Alpes region in south-eastern France.

== Population ==
Historical population
| Year | Pop. | ±% p.a. |
|---|---|---|
| 1968 | 1,311 | — |
| 1975 | 1,700 | +3.78% |
| 1982 | 1,770 | +0.58% |
| 1990 | 1,967 | +1.33% |
| 1999 | 2,063 | +0.53% |
| 2007 | 2,138 | +0.45% |
| 2012 | 2,327 | +1.71% |
| 2017 | 2,251 | −0.66% |
| 2023 | 2,320 | +0.50% |
Source: INSEE

== See also ==
- Communes of the Haute-Savoie department
