= Saint-Eustache, Haute-Savoie =

Saint-Eustache
- Commune
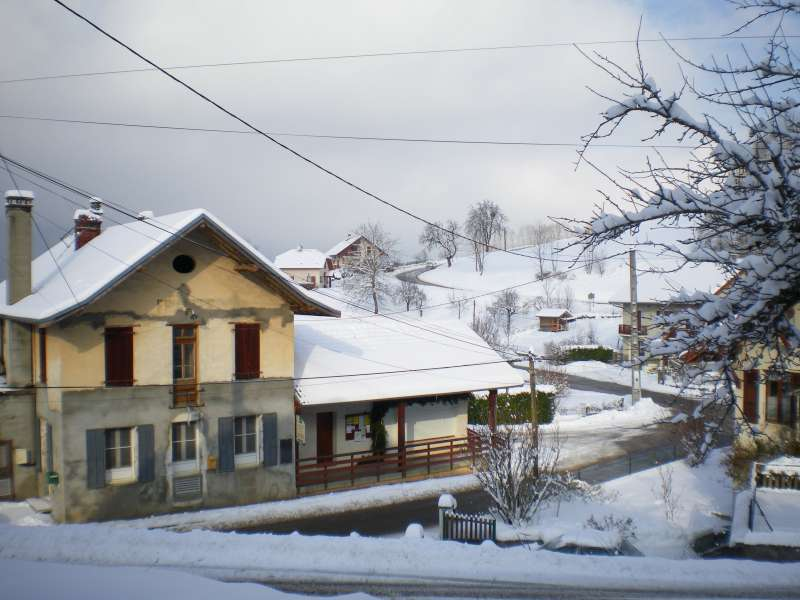
- The dairy in Saint-Eustache
- Location of Saint-Eustache
- Location within France Location within Auvergne-Rhône-Alpes
- Coordinates: 45°47′48″N 6°08′56″E
- Country: France
- Region: Auvergne-Rhône-Alpes
- Department: Haute-Savoie
- Arrondissement: Annecy
- Canton: Annecy-4
- Intercommunality: CA Grand Annecy

Government
  - Mayor (2020–2026): Jean-Pascal Albran
- Area^{1}: 10.54 km^{2} (4.07 sq mi)
- Highest elevation: 1,680 m (5,510 ft)
- Lowest elevation: 600 m (2,000 ft)
- Population (2023): 496
  - Density: 47.1/km^{2} (122/sq mi)
- Demonym: Eustachois / Eustachoises
- Time zone: UTC+01:00 (CET)
  - Summer (DST): UTC+02:00 (CEST)
- INSEE/Postal code: 74232 /74410
- ^{1} French Land Register data, which excludes lakes, ponds, glaciers > 1 km^{2} (0.386 sq mi or 247 acres) and river estuaries.

Saint-Eustache (French pronunciation: [sɛ̃t‿østaʃ]; Arpitan: Sant-Afyo) is a commune in the Haute-Savoie department in the Auvergne-Rhône-Alpes region in south-eastern France.

== See also ==
- Communes of the Haute-Savoie department
