= Cran-Gevrier =

Cran-Gevrier Kran-Zhèvrî (Savoyard)
- Part of Annecy
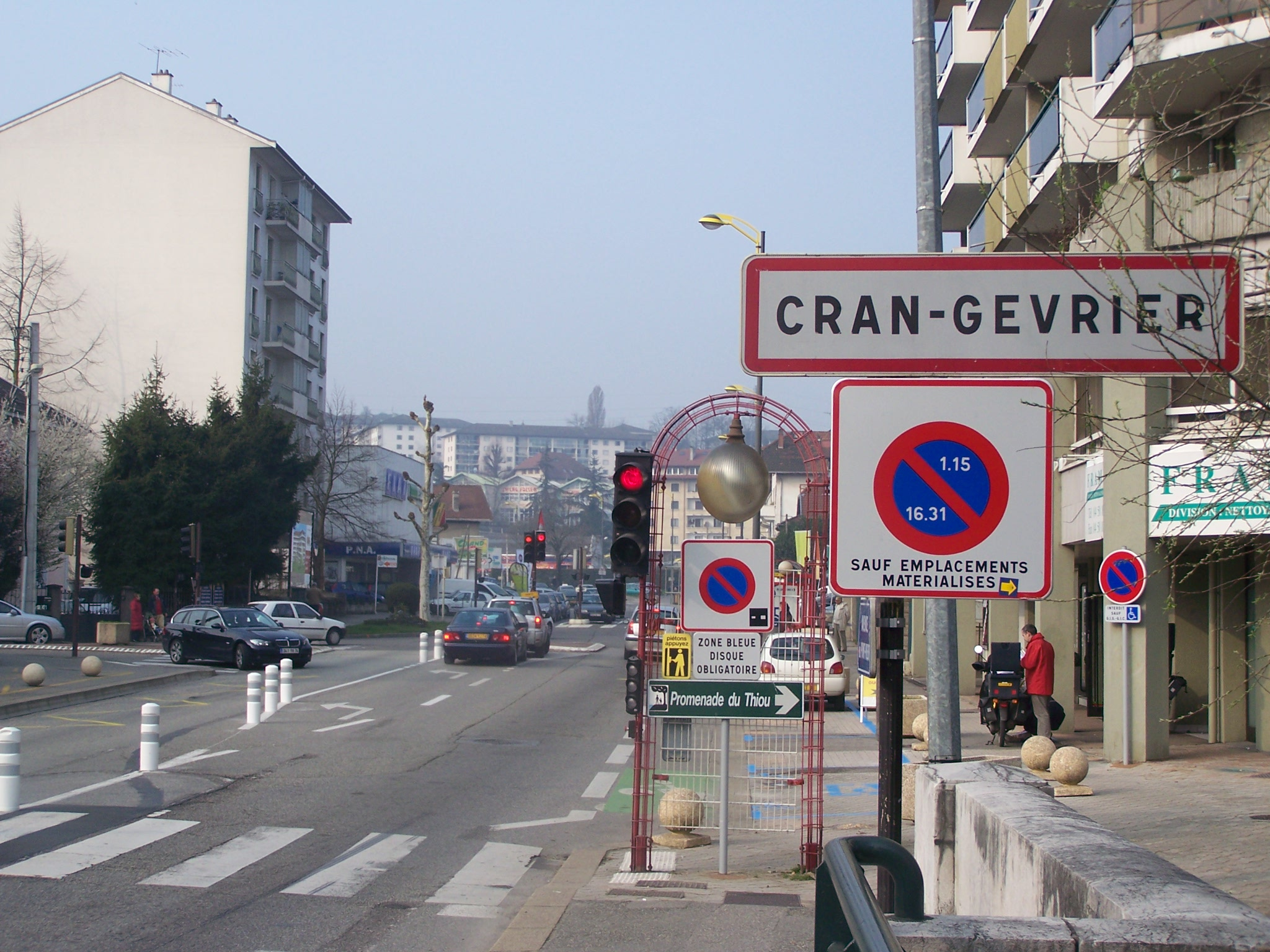
- View of Cran-Gevrier, coming from Annecy

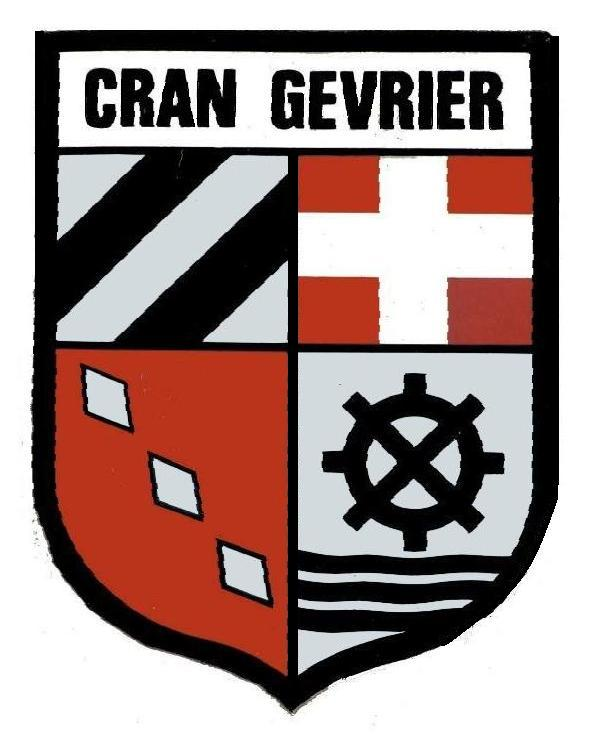
- Coat of arms
- Location of Cran-Gevrier
- Location within France Location within Auvergne-Rhône-Alpes
- Coordinates: 45°54′35″N 6°06′39″E
- Country: France
- Region: Auvergne-Rhône-Alpes
- Department: Haute-Savoie
- Arrondissement: Annecy
- Canton: Seynod
- Commune: Annecy
- Area^{1}: 4.8 km^{2} (1.9 sq mi)
- Highest elevation: 528 m (1,732 ft)
- Lowest elevation: 396 m (1,299 ft)
- Population (2022): 17,985
  - Density: 3,700/km^{2} (9,700/sq mi)
- Demonym: Cran-Gevriens / Cran-gevriennes
- Time zone: UTC+01:00 (CET)
  - Summer (DST): UTC+02:00 (CEST)
- Postal code: 74960
- Website: Ville-crangevrier.fr
- ^{1} French Land Register data, which excludes lakes, ponds, glaciers > 1 km^{2} (0.386 sq mi or 247 acres) and river estuaries.

Cran-Gevrier (French pronunciation: [kʁɑ̃ ʒəvʁije]; Arpitan: Kran-Zhèvrî) is a former commune in the Haute-Savoie department in the Auvergne-Rhône-Alpes region in southeastern France. On 1 January 2017, it was merged into the commune of Annecy.

== Geography ==
Cran-Gevrier is in the west of Annecy. Part of the town is on a hill (hill of Gevrier). The hamlet of Cran was on the level of the Thiou river. The top of the hill of Gevrier is designated as a natural area.

The Fier forms most of the commune's north-western border.

== History ==
The city draws its origins from two hamlets: Cran and Gevrier. There are two possible origins for each one of these names:

- Cran which means "notch" (permitted the establishment of a road between Boutae (Annecy) and Aquae (Aix-les-Bains), or between two rivers (river Thiou and river Fier).
- Gevrier, the oldest hamlet, got its name either from the Grabriaccus villa, or from the word "guivre", the name of a mythical snake whose role in tales is to keep treasures (one finds a snake rolled up around a sword on the blazon of the lords of Aléry).

The Romans were the first to settle on the hill. A Roman villa and a theatre were built there.

== Partner towns ==
- Piossasco, Italy
- Trenčín, Slovakia
- Bathgate, Scotland The twinning agreement between Bathgate and Cran-Gevrier was signed in March 2010. Since then, many different projects have been started up, including International Camps for young people (including young Italians from Piossasco) as well as school-to-school projects.

== See also ==
- Communes of the Haute-Savoie department
