= Épagny, Haute-Savoie =

Épagny Épanyi (Savoyard)
- Part of Épagny-Metz-Tessy
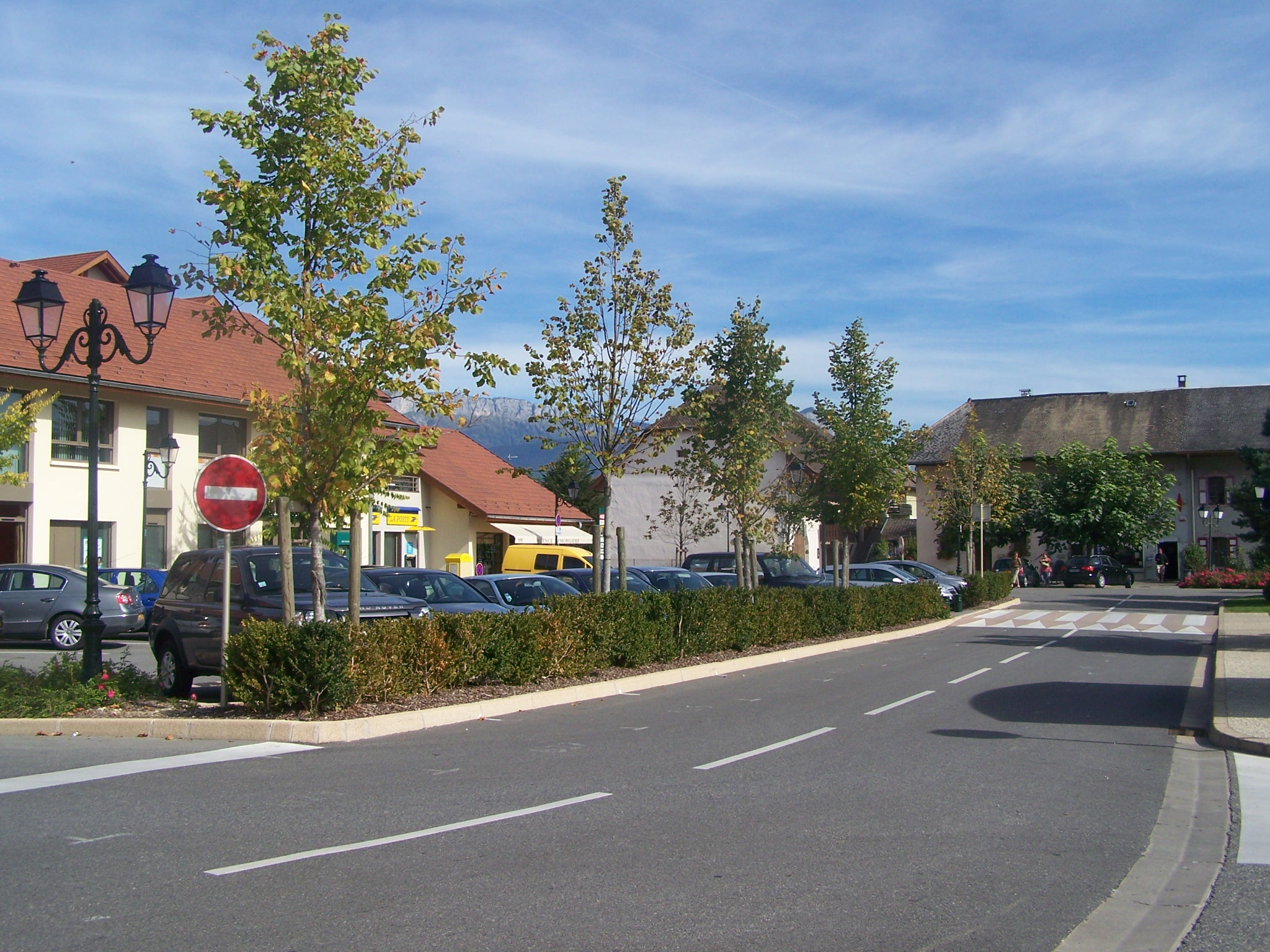
- A street in Épagny
- Location of Épagny
- Location within France Location within Auvergne-Rhône-Alpes
- Coordinates: 45°56′18″N 6°05′30″E
- Country: France
- Region: Auvergne-Rhône-Alpes
- Department: Haute-Savoie
- Arrondissement: Annecy
- Canton: Annecy-le-Vieux
- Commune: Épagny-Metz-Tessy
- Area^{1}: 6.735 km^{2} (2.600 sq mi)
- Highest elevation: 770 m (2,530 ft)
- Lowest elevation: 452 m (1,483 ft)
- Population (2013): 4,118
  - Density: 611.4/km^{2} (1,584/sq mi)
- Demonym: Épaniens / Épaniennes
- Time zone: UTC+01:00 (CET)
  - Summer (DST): UTC+02:00 (CEST)
- Postal code: 74330
- ^{1} French Land Register data, which excludes lakes, ponds, glaciers > 1 km^{2} (0.386 sq mi or 247 acres) and river estuaries.

Épagny (French pronunciation: [epaɲi]; Savoyard: Épanyi) is a former commune in the Haute-Savoie department in the Auvergne-Rhône-Alpes region in south-eastern France. On 1 January 2016, it was merged into the new commune of Épagny Metz-Tessy.

== See also ==
- Communes of the Haute-Savoie department
