= Poisy =

- Commune
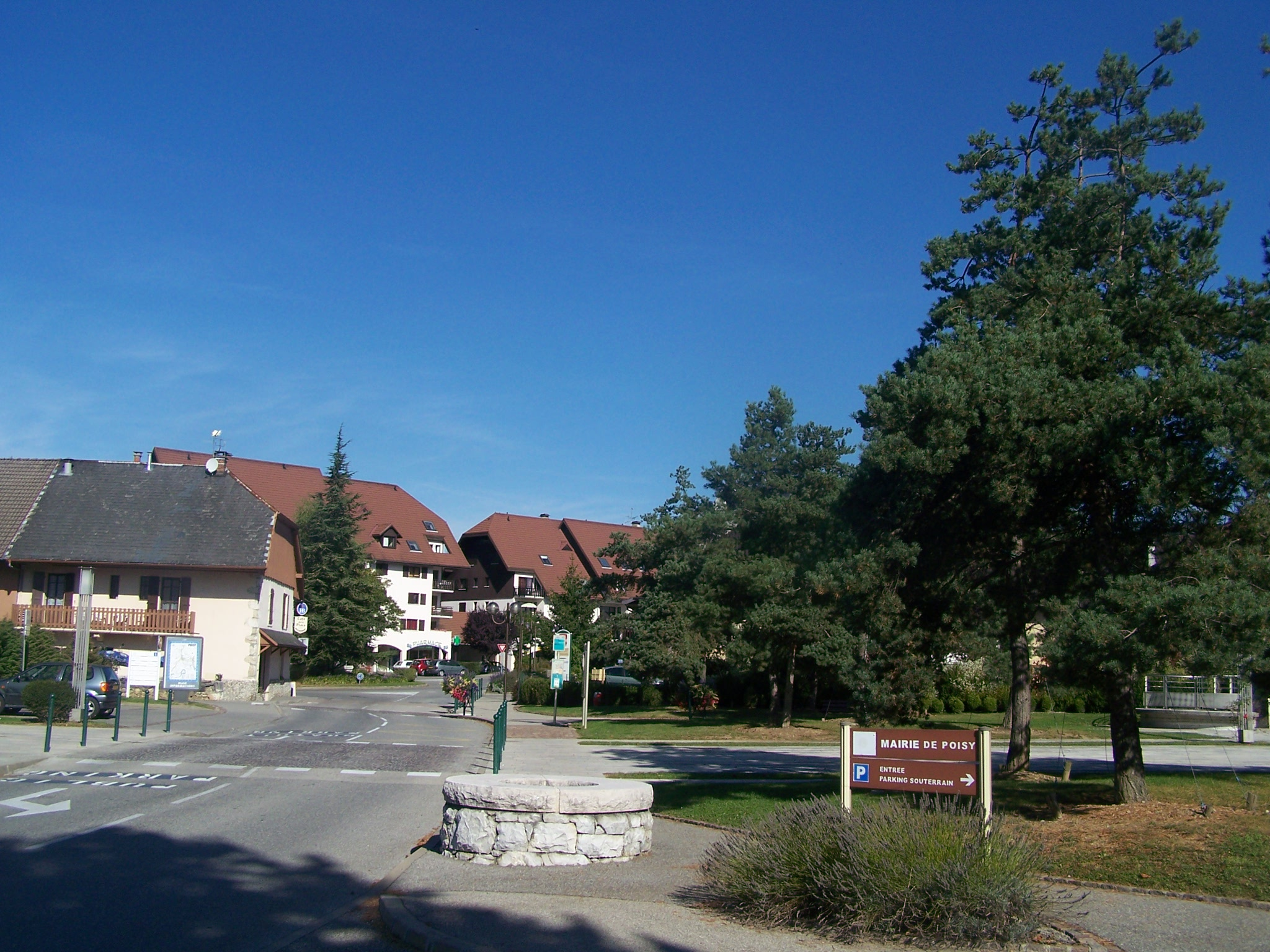
- A view of the centre of Poisy

- Coat of arms
- Location of Poisy
- Location within France Location within Auvergne-Rhône-Alpes
- Coordinates: 45°55′18″N 6°03′44″E
- Country: France
- Region: Auvergne-Rhône-Alpes
- Department: Haute-Savoie
- Arrondissement: Annecy
- Canton: Annecy-1
- Intercommunality: CA Grand Annecy

Government
  - Mayor (2020–2026): Pierre Bruyère
- Area^{1}: 11.33 km^{2} (4.37 sq mi)
- Highest elevation: 675 m (2,215 ft)
- Lowest elevation: 384 m (1,260 ft)
- Population (2023): 9,291
  - Density: 820.0/km^{2} (2,124/sq mi)
- Demonym: Poisilliens
- Time zone: UTC+01:00 (CET)
  - Summer (DST): UTC+02:00 (CEST)
- INSEE/Postal code: 74213 /74330
- Website: www.poisy.fr
- ^{1} French Land Register data, which excludes lakes, ponds, glaciers > 1 km^{2} (0.386 sq mi or 247 acres) and river estuaries.

Poisy (French pronunciation: [pwazi]; Arpitan: Pouêzy) is a commune in the Haute-Savoie department in the Auvergne-Rhône-Alpes region in south-eastern France. It is part of the urban area of Annecy.

== Geography ==
The Fier forms the commune's southern border.

== Population ==
Historical population
Year	Pop.	±% p.a.
1968	1,717	—
1975	2,407	+4.94%
1982	2,902	+2.71%
1990	4,316	+5.09%
1999	5,487	+2.70%
2007	6,310	+1.76%
2012	7,017	+2.15%
2017	8,124	+2.97%
2023	9,291	+2.26%
Source: INSEE

== See also ==
- Communes of the Haute-Savoie department
