= Communauté d'agglomération du Grand Annecy =

Coordinates: 45.90°N 6.12°E

Grand Annecy
- Communauté d'agglomération
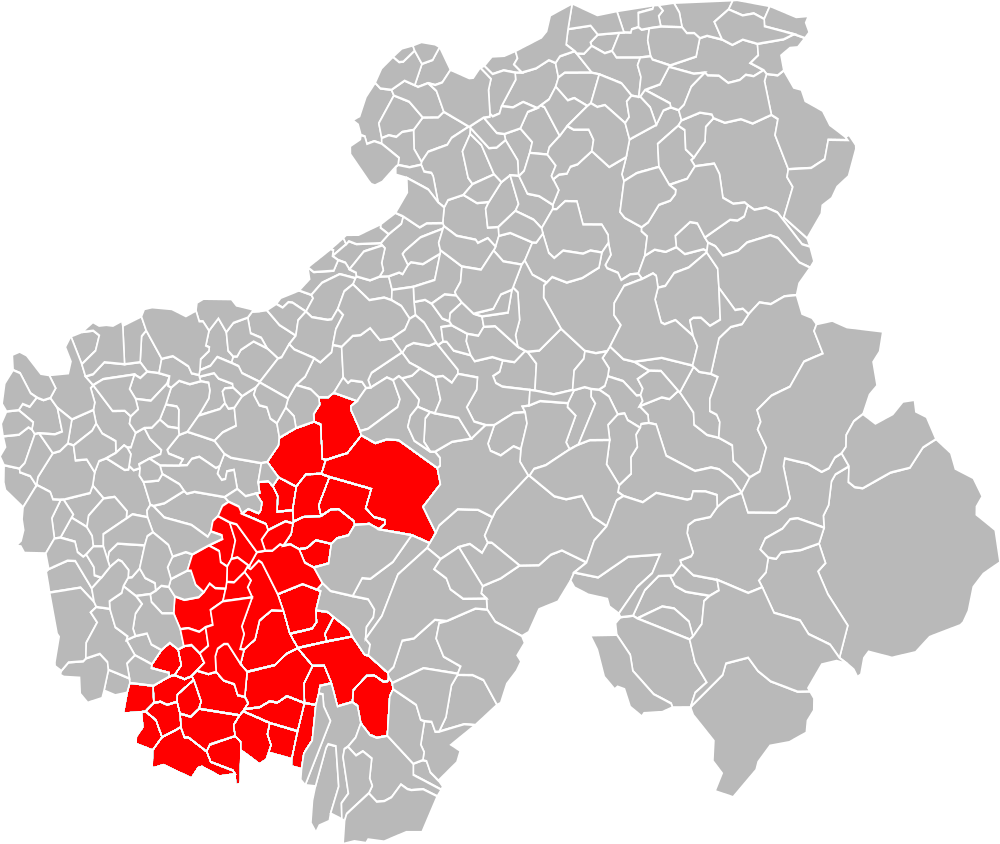
- Location Greater Annecy in Haute-Savoie .
- Country: France
- Region: Auvergne-Rhône-Alpes
- Department: Haute-Savoie
- No. of communes: {{{nbcomm}}}
- Established: January 2017
- Area: 515.0 km^{2} (198.8 sq mi)
- Population (2018): 203,784
  - Density: 395.7/km^{2} (1,025/sq mi)
- Website: www.grandannecy.fr

The Communauté d'agglomération du Grand Annecy is the communauté d'agglomération, an intercommunal structure, centred on the city of Annecy. It is located in the Haute-Savoie department, in the Auvergne-Rhône-Alpes region, southeastern France. It was created in January 2017 by the merger of the former communauté de l'agglomération d'Annecy and four communautés de communes. Its area is 515.0 km^{2}. Its population was 203,784 in 2018, of which 128,199 in Annecy proper.

== Composition ==
The Communauté d'agglomération du Grand Annecy consists of the following 34 communes:

1. Alby-sur-Chéran
2. Allèves
3. Annecy
4. Argonay
5. Bluffy
6. Chainaz-les-Frasses
7. Chapeiry
8. Charvonnex
9. Chavanod
10. Cusy
11. Duingt
12. Entrevernes
13. Épagny-Metz-Tessy
14. Fillière
15. Groisy
16. Gruffy
17. Héry-sur-Alby
18. La Chapelle-Saint-Maurice
19. Leschaux
20. Menthon-Saint-Bernard
21. Montagny-les-Lanches
22. Mûres
23. Nâves-Parmelan
24. Poisy
25. Quintal
26. Saint-Eustache
27. Saint-Félix
28. Saint-Jorioz
29. Saint-Sylvestre
30. Sevrier
31. Talloires-Montmin
32. Veyrier-du-Lac
33. Villaz
34. Viuz-la-Chiésaz
