= Semnoz =

Mountain in France

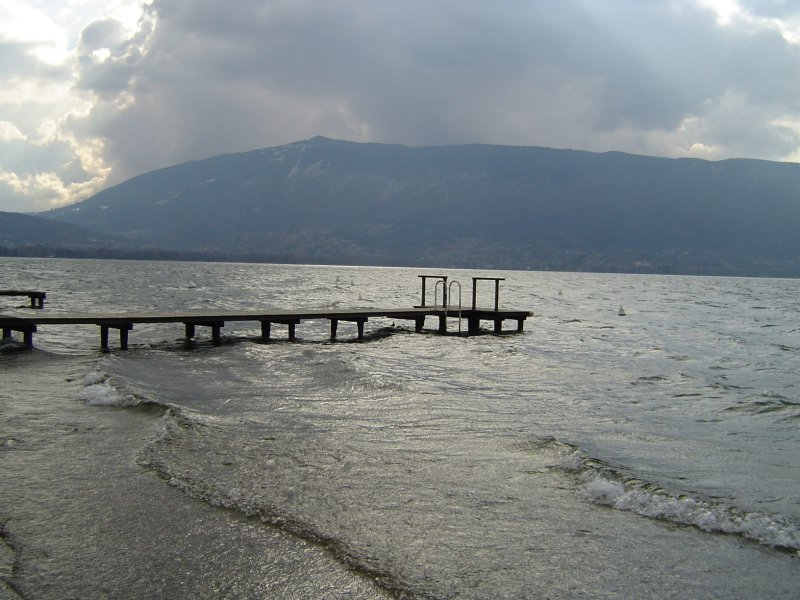
- Semnoz seen from Menthon-Saint-Bernard on Lake Annecy

Highest point
- Elevation: 1,702 m (5,584 ft)
- Coordinates: 45°47′50″N 06°06′17″E

Geography
- Location within Alps
- Location: Haute-Savoie, France
- Parent range: Bauges

Semnoz (French pronunciation: [sɛmnoz]) is a mountain in Haute-Savoie, France in the Bauges range at an altitude of 1,702 m (5,584 ft). The mountain is crossed by the D41/D110 road near to the Crêt de Chatillon at an altitude of 1,660 m (5,446 ft).

== Tour de France ==
The penultimate stage of the 2013 Tour de France (Stage 20) saw a summit finish on Semnoz, 125 km (78 mi) after departing from Annecy. The mountain has featured in the Tour previously, but this was during a neutralized stage in the wake of the 1998 Festina affair.

== Details of the climb ==
The Crêt de Chatillon can be reached by road from three directions. From the south, the climb via the D110 commences at the village of Leschaux from where the ascent is 13.4 km (8.3 mi) long climbing 763 m (2,503 ft) at an average gradient of 5.7% with a maximum gradient of 10.2%.

From the north, the climb via the D41 commences in Annecy, from where the road is 17.4 km (10.8 mi) long climbing 1,212 m (3,976 ft) with an average gradient of 7%.

From the west, the climb commences at Quintal and uses the D241 before reaching the D41 after 3.5 km (2.2 mi). The total climb is 11.3 km (7.0 mi) long gaining 922 m (3,025 ft) in height at an average gradient of 8.2%. This is the route used on Stage 20 of the 2013 Tour de France and is ranked as an Hors catégorie climb. The route to the summit from the start at Annecy crosses the Col de Leschaux (944 m (3,097 ft)) after 17.5 km (10.9 mi) before descending to Saint-Jean-d'Arvey.

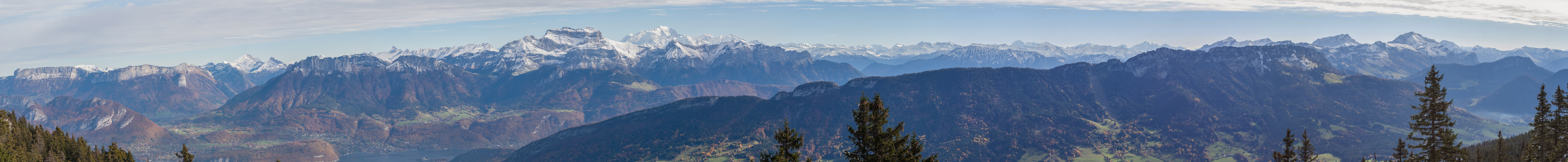
Panorama from the Semnoz, view to the east

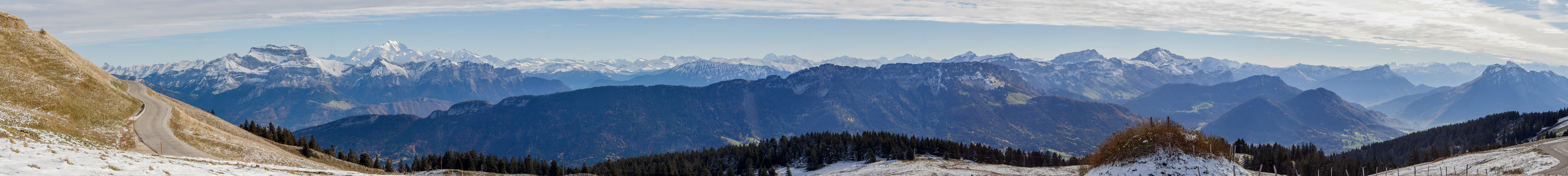
Panorama from the Semnoz, view to the south-east
