= Peter II of Savoy =

European noble

Peter II
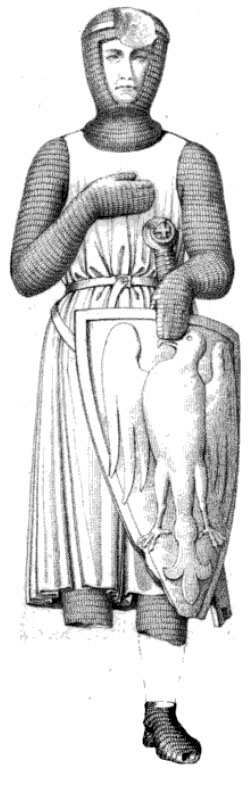
- Peter's funerary monument

Count of Savoy
- Reign: 1263–1268
- Predecessor: Boniface
- Successor: Philip I
- Born: c. 1203 possibly Susa, Piedmont
- Died: 15 May 1268; Château de Pierre-Châtel, Bugey
- Burial: Hautecombe Abbey
- Spouse: Agnes of Faucigny
- Issue: Beatrice of Savoy, Dame of Faucigny
- House: Savoy
- Father: Thomas I, Count of Savoy
- Mother: Margaret of Geneva

Peter II (c. 1203 – 15 May 1268), called the Little Charlemagne, was Count of Savoy from 1263 until his death in 1268. He was also holder of the Honour of Richmond, Yorkshire in England, and the English lands of the Honour of the Eagle also known as the Honour of Pevensey and the Honour of Eu also known as the Honour of Hastings. His significant land holdings in the English County of Sussex were also marked by his holding of the wardship of John de Warenne, 6th Earl of Surrey which brought with it lands centred upon Lewes castle. Briefly, from 1241 until 1242, castellan of Dover Castle and Keeper of the Coast (later called Lord Warden of the Cinque Ports). In 1243 he was granted land by the River Thames on the Strand near the City of London, where he built the Savoy Palace.

== Biography ==
=== Early career in Savoy ===
Peter was born around 1203, possibly at Susa, Piedmont. He was likely the seventh child of Thomas I, Count of Savoy and Margaret of Geneva. It was through his sister Beatrice of Savoy and her daughters: Margaret of Provence, Queen of France, Eleanor of Provence, Queen of England, Sanchia of Provence, Queen of the Romans and Beatrice of Provence, Queen of Sicily and Naples, that the House of Savoy and Peter in particular would derive much of their career and influence.

As a younger son of a noble house, Peter started his career in the church, obtaining appointments in dioceses under the influence of his family. From 1226 to 1233 he was a canon at Lausanne, where he was briefly acting bishop before a new permanent bishop was named in 1231. Peter also held the offices of canon at Lyon and of provost at Aosta and Geneva, before retiring from church life in 1234. Upon the death of his father, Peter demanded substantial portions of the county from his eldest brother Amadeus. The brothers met at Chillon in 1234, where they negotiated a settlement which recognized Amadeus as the head of the house. From this, Peter received control of the key castles of the Château de Cornillon at Saint-Rambert-en-Bugey and the Château d'Angeville at what is now Hauteville-Lompnes also in Bugey. both of which helped him threaten Geneva. His brother William negotiated a marriage for him with Agnes of Faucigny, which also helped provide territory of his own, so he caused less trouble for his elder brothers. The marriage also allowed him to influence Burgundian affairs as Agnes was related to the Joinville family. This relationship brought Geoffrey de Geneville, 1st Baron Geneville, Agnes's half-brother, to England. The younger Simon de Joinville, another of Agnes's half-brothers, would provide the conduit by which Burgundian knights would serve England both in Gascony and Wales.

His desire to further extend his territory led him into conflict with his uncle, William II of Geneva. Around 1236, Peter was ambushed and captured by his cousin Rudolf. When the resulting conflict was concluded in 1237, Amadeus forced William to sign a treaty which required Geneva to pay 20,000 marks and the castle of Arlod. In 1240, when Peter's brother Philip was in a contested election for the Bishop of Lausanne against Jean de Cossonay, a Geneva supported candidate, Peter brought 6000 troops, though the battle did not get resolved decisively.

He continued using both money and force to take further control of lands surrounding Savoy. In May 1244 Rudolph III, Count of Gruyère, surrendered Gruyères Castle to Peter, who then gave it to William, the second son of Rudolph, with the agreement that William and his heirs would serve Peter and his family. On 29 May 1244, Cossonay similarly surrendered significant territories to Peter and Amadeus, retaining them only under the overlordship of Savoy. He continued to gain control of key towns and trade routes throughout the Pays de Vaud, often by enfeofing them to the younger sons of the previous rulers. He was responsible for the significant renovations of the Château de Chillon, and by 1253 he was the protector of Bern. One scholar suggests that French is the language of western Switzerland due partly to Peter's extensive conquests in the region.

=== English career ===
In January 1236, Eleanor of Provence, Peter's niece, married King Henry III and Peter came with a number of other Savoyards. On 20 April 1240, Peter was given the Honour of Richmond by Henry III who invited him to England about the end of the year, and knighted him on 5 January 1241 when he became known popularly as Earl of Richmond although he never assumed the title, nor was it ever given to him in official documents. On 25 September 1241 he was granted the Honour of the Eagle and wardship of John de Warenne, 6th Earl of Surrey bringing much land in Sussex and the south coast of England. His position on the south coast was further strengthened in 1249 by the Honour of Eu, also known as the Honour of Hastings. In February 1246 he was granted land between the Strand and the Thames, where Peter built the Savoy Palace in 1263, on the site of the present Savoy Hotel. It was destroyed during the Peasants' Revolt of 1381. By his will, the Honour of Richmond was left to his niece Queen Eleanor, who transferred it to the crown.

In 1241, Henry sent Peter to gather support for a pending invasion of Poitou. He travelled to Hugh IV, Duke of Burgundy; Theobald I of Navarre; his brother Amadeus IV, Count of Savoy; and his brother-in-law Ramon Berenguer IV, Count of Provence. In February 1242, Peter was sent into Poitou to see what support existed there for Henry. He was nearly captured there, but managed to escape. He then travelled to Provence to negotiate the marriage of his niece Sanchia of Provence to Henry's brother Richard.

In 1246, Peter went back to Savoy, in part to seal a marriage deal with Amadeus. In February 1247, he returned to England with Alice of Saluzzo, Amadeus's granddaughter by Beatrice. She was married to Edmund de Lacy, Baron of Pontefract that May.

Boston (a borough by 1279), on the River Witham, had over many years become an important port for Lincoln. The town was held by the Dukes of Brittany until about 1200. In 1241, Peter obtained the manor of Boston at the same time as he had Richmond. It was restored to John I, Duke of Brittany, on Peter's death. Donington manor is also thought to have been passed from John de la Rye to Peter of Savoy about 1255, when a charter was granted for a market to be held at the manor on Saturdays. In the same year, a similar grant was made for the holding of a fair on 15 August, also to be held at the manor. A separate charter was granted to Peter on 8 April 1255 by the king to hold a market on Mondays.

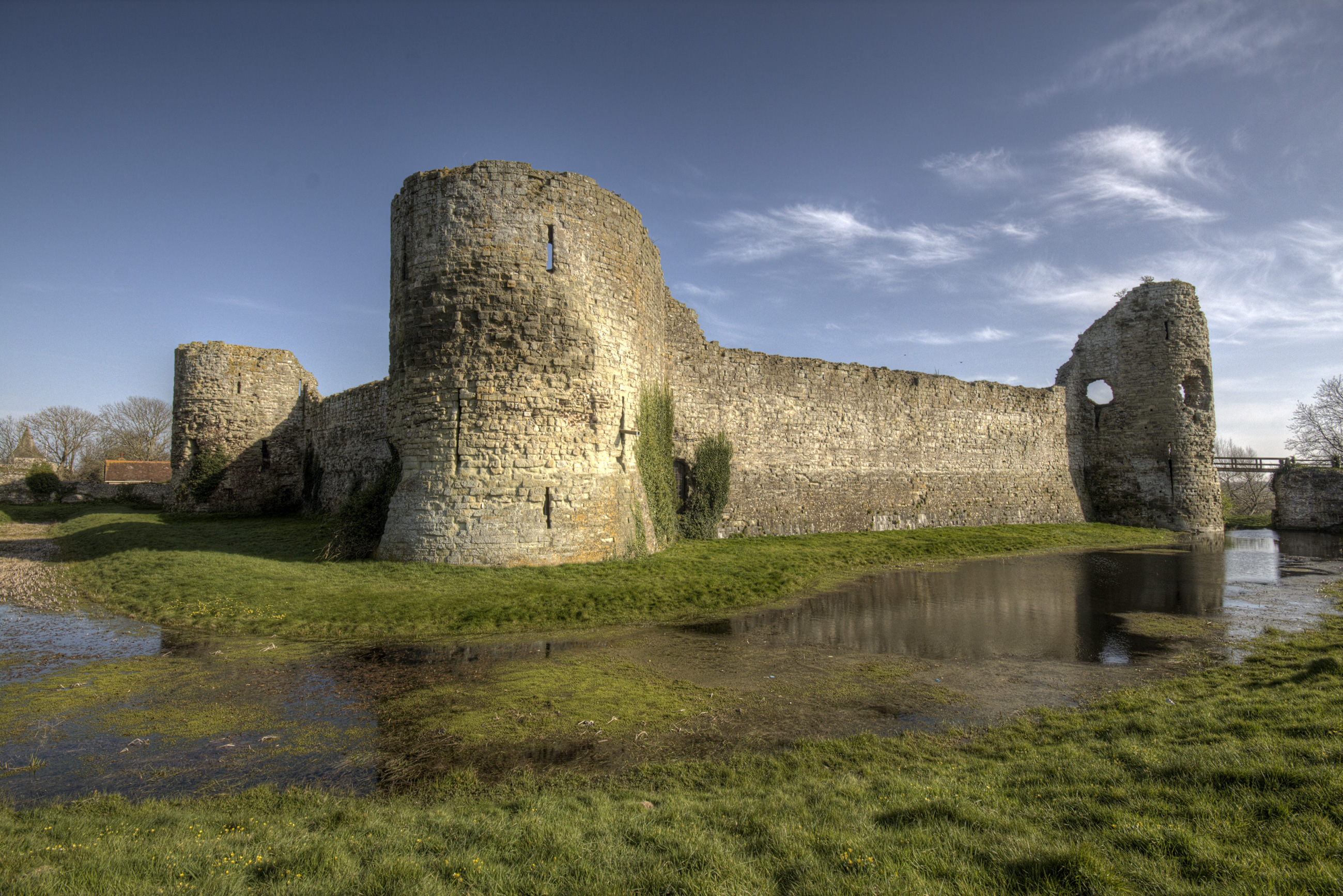
The walls of the inner ward at Pevensey Castle are typically attributed to Peter of Savoy's tenure

In 1246, the king granted Peter the castle of Pevensey. Peter originally, in 1258, sided with Simon de Montfort, Earl of Leicester, in the Second Barons' War; but sided with Eleanor of Provence, his niece and his son-in-law King Henry III of England from 1261 against Montfort.

=== English Reform and Second Baronial War ===
Peter of Savoy played an important role in the events which led to the Provisions of Oxford in England in 1258 which would lead to the Second Barons' War. Prior to the formal demands made in Westminster of King Henry III on 30 April 1258, a number of barons had made a solemn oath on 12 April 1258 to assist each other in supporting the reform of the realm. These oath takers would form the core of the baronial movement supporting reform, and were “Richard de Clare, 6th Earl of Gloucester; Roger Bigod, 4th Earl of Norfolk; Simon de Montfort, 6th Earl of Leicester; Peter of Savoy; Hugh Bigod; John fitz Geoffrey; and Peter of Montfort.” Peter of Savoy sided with the reforming barons in order to reduce the political influence of the Lusignan half brothers of King Henry III who were in the view of Peter and his niece, the Queen Eleanor of Provence exerting undue influence at court. However, Peter broke with the reformers in 1260 when Montfort had him removed from the ruling council. Thereafter Peter of Savoy spent an increasing time in Savoy until becoming Count of Savoy in 1263.

Following the Battle of Evesham in 1265 Pevensey Castle and Richmond Castle were besieged by the Monfortian government. Both castles were held by Peter’s constables and stewards. Pevensey Castle in particular received a resupply of men and material from Peter in Flanders. Peter and Eleanor of Provence had gathered an army in Flanders to invade England to restore King Henry III to his throne. The escape of Lord Edward and subsequent Battle of Evesham rendered the invasion unnecessary.

=== Count of Savoy ===
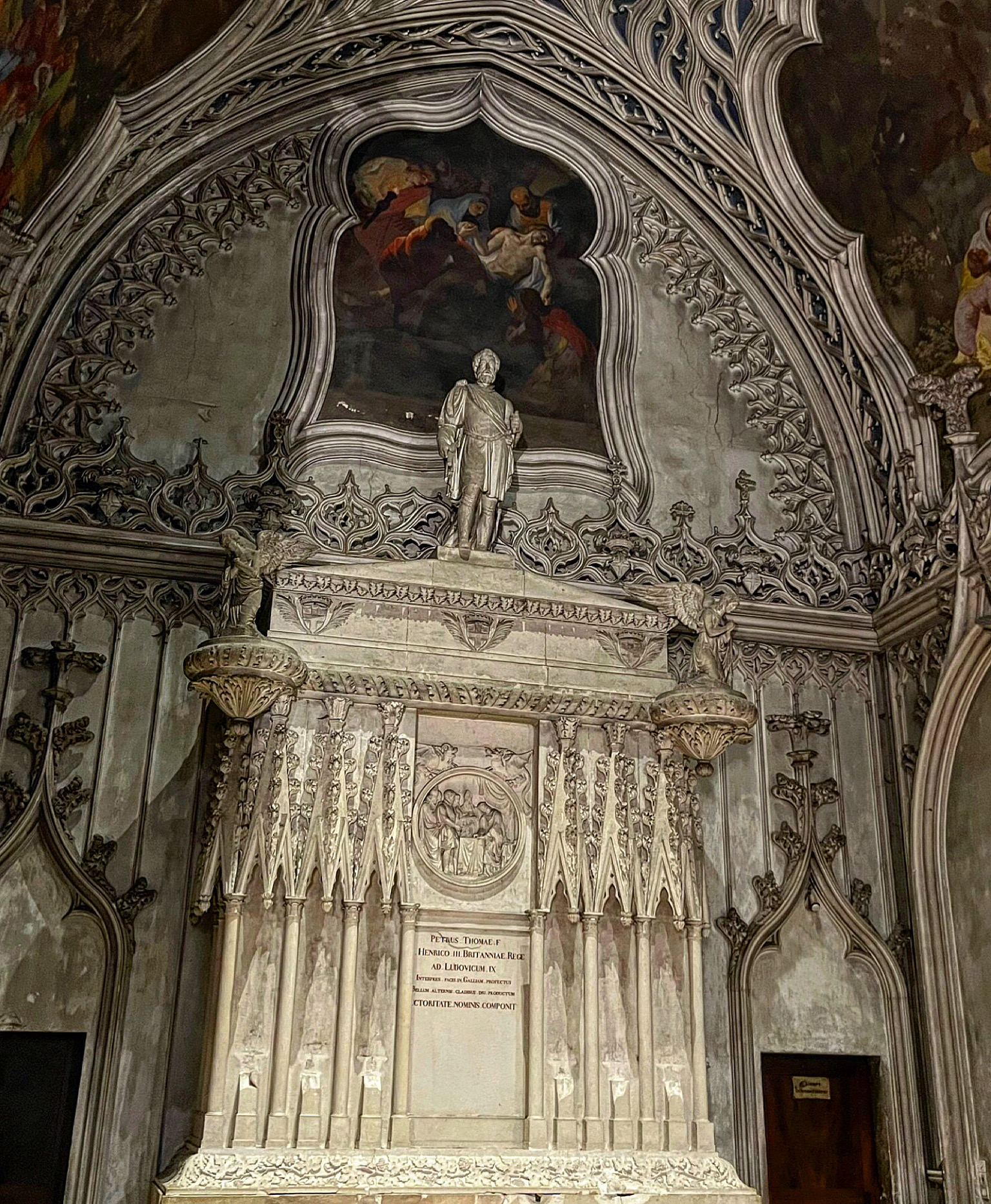
The nineteenth century cenotaph to Peter of Savoy at Hautecombe Abbey

When Peter's nephew Boniface, Count of Savoy, died without heirs in 1263, the question of the succession to Savoy lay unanswered. Besides Peter, there was another possible claimant, the fifteen-year-old Thomas III of Piedmont (1248–82), the eldest son of Peter's elder brother Thomas, Count of Flanders. Peter returned to Savoy and was recognised as count over his nephew. This led to a dispute between Savoy and Piedmont that was to outlast Peter and Thomas.

Peter brought many ideas back from his travels around Europe to improve Savoy. He started building castles with a more round form, rather than the square which had existed to that point in Savoy. He divided the county into bailis and divided those into castellanies. He also established an office of accounts at Chambéry to more completely manage financial matters. He was the first count of Savoy to issue laws to cover the whole county. These statutes included the provision that his judges not delay justice which is attributable to the Magna Carta in England

Peter came into conflict with Rudolf of Habsburg, and Henri of Raron, Bishop of Sion.

Peter died without a male heir in 1268, at the castle of Pierre-Châtel, now in Virignin, and was buried in Hautecombe Abbey. His will left his English lands to Eleanor of Provence, the Queen of England, his niece, modified by a codicil which left his Sussex lands to his nephews, Amadeus and Louis. These bequests were the subject of modification by King Henry III of England who had given the Honour of Richmond to his son-in-law, John of Brittany, Earl of Richmond and the Sussex lands to the Lord Edward. But as per his will, he was succeeded as Count of Savoy by his remaining brother, Philip, former procurator and archbishop-elect of Lyon.

== Marriage and issue ==
Peter's marriage was to Agnes of Faucigny in 1236.Agnes was the daughter of Aymon II de Faucigny and Béatrice d'Auxonne. The marriage brought the House of Savoy increasing influence in Faucigny which lay south east of Geneva and had hitherto been within the sphere of influence of the Count of Geneva. It also brought influence within the Free County of Burgundy through his mother-in-law Béatrice. The subsequent marriage of Béatrice d'Auxonne to Simon de Joinville extended Peter's influence further to include their children Geoffrey de Geneville, 1st Baron Geneville, whom Peter introduced to the English court, and Simon de Joinville, the Seigneur de Gex.

They had one daughter, Beatrice, (Note: Beatrice would marry firstly Count Guigues VII of Viennois and secondly Viscount Gaston VII of Béarn.) who inherited Faucigny from her mother. The marriage alliance with the County of Albon, also known as the Dauphiné, whilst advantageous at the time, created long term problems for the County of Savoy when Albon became a part of France. This created a French claim to Faucigny whose territory lay in the middle of Savoy.

== Bibliography ==
- Arnold-Baker, Charles (2015). von Blumenthal, Henry (ed.). The Companion to British History. Routledge.
- Cox, Eugene L. (1974). The Eagles of Savoy. Princeton: Princeton University Press. ISBN 0691052166.
- Cox, Eugene L. (1967). The Green Count of Savoy. Princeton, New Jersey: Princeton University Press. LCCN 67-11030.
- Howell, Margaret (2001). Eleanor of Provence. Blackwell Publishers.
- Demotz, Bernard (2000). Le Comté de Savoie du XIe au XVe Siècle. Geneva: Editions Slatkine.
- Jobson, Adrian (2012). The First English Revolution: Simon de Montfort, Henry III and the Barons' War. Bloomsbury.
- Marshall, John (2023). Peter of Savoy: The Little Charlemagne. Pen and Sword.
- Pollock, M. A. (2015). Scotland, England and France After the Loss of Normandy, 1204–1296. The Boydell Press.
- Raban, Sandra (2003). "Edward I's Other Inquires". In Prestwich, Michael; Britnell, R. H.; Frame, Robin (eds.). Thirteenth Century England IX: Proceedings of the Durham Conference 2001. The Boydell Press.
- Shacklock, Antonia (2021). "Henry III and the Native Saints". In Spencer, Andrew; Watkins, Carl (eds.). Thirteenth Century England XVII: Proceedings of the Cambridge Conference, 2017. The Boydell Press. pp. 23–40.
- Wurstemberger, L. (1858). Peter der Zweite. Bern.

== Notes ==
Peter II House of Savoy Born: 1203 Died: 15 May 1268
Preceded by Boniface	Count of Savoy; 1263–1268	Succeeded by Philip I
Preceded by The Lord de Segrove	Lord Warden of the Cinque Ports; 1241–1255	Succeeded by The Lord Cobham
Vacant Title last held by Peter Mauclerc	Earl of Richmond; 1241–1268	Succeeded by John the Red
