= Thomas of Savoy =

Thomas of Savoy may refer to:

- Thomas I, Count of Savoy, first Thomas to rule Savoy
- Thomas II of Piedmont, second Thomas to rule Savoy (as regent)
- Thomas III of Piedmont
- Thomas Francis, Prince of Carignano, of the House of Savoy
