= Thomas of Piedmont =

Thomas of Piedmont may refer to:

- Thomas I of Piedmont
- Thomas II of Piedmont
- Thomas III of Piedmont
