= Philip I of Savoy =

Philip I

Count of Savoy
- Reign: 1268–1285
- Predecessor: Peter II
- Successor: Amadeus V
- Born: 1207; Aiguebelle
- Died: 16 August 1285; Roussillon
- Spouse: Adelaide, Countess Palatine of Burgundy
- Father: Thomas, Count of Savoy
- Mother: Margaret of Geneva
- Religion: Catholic Church

Philip I (1207 – 16 August 1285) was Count of Savoy from 1268 to 1285. Before this, he was Bishop of Valence (1241–1267) and Archbishop of Lyon (1245–1267).

== Ecclesiastical career ==
Philip was born in Aiguebelle, Savoy, as the eighth and last son of Count Thomas I of Savoy and Margaret of Geneva. His family prepared him for a clerical career. In 1236, his brother William was able to use his influence with Henry III of England to get Philip positions in the churches of Hillingdon, Oxney, and Geddington. In 1240, he was elected Bishop of Lausanne with the support of his brother Peter, but had to resign. Instead, he became Bishop of Valence in 1241. His brother Thomas had Philip installed as chancellor of Flanders and prévôt of St-Donatien-de-Bruges.

In 1243, while Henry was fighting in Gascony, Philip escorted his sister Beatrice of Savoy and niece Sanchia of Provence to visit Eleanor, Henry, and their new baby Beatrice. This so cheered the besieged king that he lavished further gifts on the bishop.

In 1244, Pope Innocent IV fled from Rome, and Philip convinced his brother, Count Amadeus IV of Savoy, to let the pope pass through Savoy. Philip escorted the Pope to Lyon, and then remained with him to ensure his safety. Pope Innocent ensured Philip's election as Archbishop of Lyon in 1245.

While there, Philip continued his family's policies of governing through trade. In 1248 he negotiated with Aymar III of Valentinois to reduce the taxes that traders would pay on foods travelling through his lands, and over the next few years, he granted charters to towns throughout the area.

== Reign ==
When, against expectations, Philip became the next heir for the County of Savoy, he gave his church offices up and married Countess Adelaide of Burgundy, on 12 June 1267. He became Count of Savoy in 1268, and in 1272 he also acquired the County of Bresse. While he was at first successful in extending the power of Savoy, in 1282 he was opposed by a coalition of King Rudolph I, Charles of Anjou (who was also count of Provence), the dauphin of Viennois, and the counts of Geneva.

His will appointed his niece Queen Eleanor of Provence and her son King Edward I of England as adjudicators of his estate; they appointed his nephew, Amadeus, as his successor. Philip died childless in Roussillon in 1285.

== Sources ==
- Cox, Eugene L. (1974). The Eagles of Savoy. Princeton: Princeton University Press. ISBN 0691052166.
- Michel, ed. (1885). Rôles gascons. Paris.
- Monier, R. (1948). Les Institutions financières du comté de Flandre du XI siècle à 1384. Paris.
- Shacklock, Antonia (2021). "Henry III and the Native Saints". In Spencer, Andrew; Watkins, Carl (eds.). Thirteenth Century England XVII: Proceedings of the Cambridge Conference, 2017. The Boydell Press. pp. 23–40.
- Taylor, Arnold (1985). Studies in Castles and Castle-Building. London: Hambledon Press. ISBN 0907628516.

Philip I House of Savoy Born: 1207 Died: 16 August 1285
Regnal titles
Preceded by Peter II	Count of Savoy; 1268–1285	Succeeded by Amadeus V
