= Boniface of Savoy (bishop) =

Archbishop of Canterbury from 1241 to 1270

Blessed Boniface of Savoy
- Archbishop of Canterbury
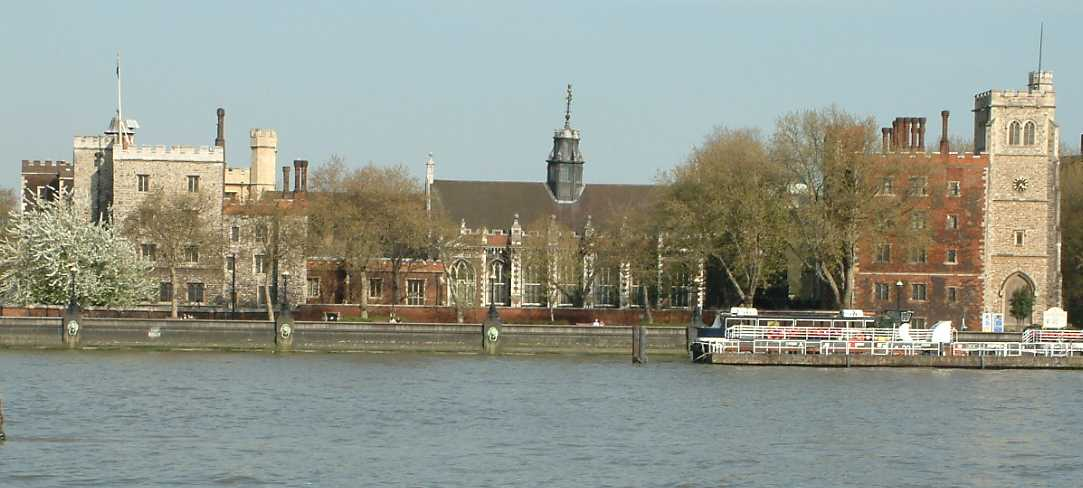
- The site of Lambeth Palace, where Boniface resided as an archbishop
- Church: Catholic Church
- Appointed: 1 February 1241
- Installed: 1249
- Term ended: 18 July 1270
- Predecessor: Edmund of Abingdon
- Successor: William Chillenden

Orders
- Consecration: 15 January 1245 by Innocent IV

Personal details
- Died: 18 July 1270 Savoy
- Buried: Hautecombe Abbey
- Parents: Thomas I, Count of Savoy; Margaret of Geneva

Sainthood
- Feast day: 4 July
- Venerated in: Catholic Church
- Beatified: 1839 by Gregory XVI

Boniface of Savoy (c. 1207 – 18 July 1270) was a medieval Bishop of Belley in Savoy and Archbishop of Canterbury in England. He was the son of Thomas, Count of Savoy, and owed his initial ecclesiastical posts to his father. Other members of his family were also clergymen, and a brother succeeded his father as count. One niece, Eleanor of Provence, was married to King Henry III of England, and another was married to King Louis IX of France. It was Henry who secured Boniface's election as Archbishop, and throughout his tenure of that office, he spent much time on the continent. He clashed with his bishops, with his nephew-by-marriage, and with the papacy, but managed to eliminate the archiepiscopal debt that he had inherited on taking office. During Simon de Montfort's struggle with King Henry, Boniface initially helped Montfort's cause but later supported the king. After his death in Savoy, his tomb became the object of a cult, and he was eventually beatified in 1839.

== Early life ==
Boniface and his elder brother Amadeus IV, Count of Savoy were sons of Thomas I, Count of Savoy, and Margaret of Geneva. He is thus not to be confused with his nephew and fellow member of the House of Savoy, Count Boniface of Savoy, the son of Amadeus IV. The elder Boniface was born about 1207 in Savoy. He was the eleventh child of his parents. Some sources state that at a young age he joined the Carthusian Order. However, there is no evidence of this, and it would have been very unusual for a nobleman to enter that order with its very strict discipline. He also had a brother Peter of Savoy who was named Earl of Richmond in 1240 and yet another brother William of Savoy, who was Bishop of Valence and a candidate to be Bishop of Winchester in England.

== Ecclesiastical career ==
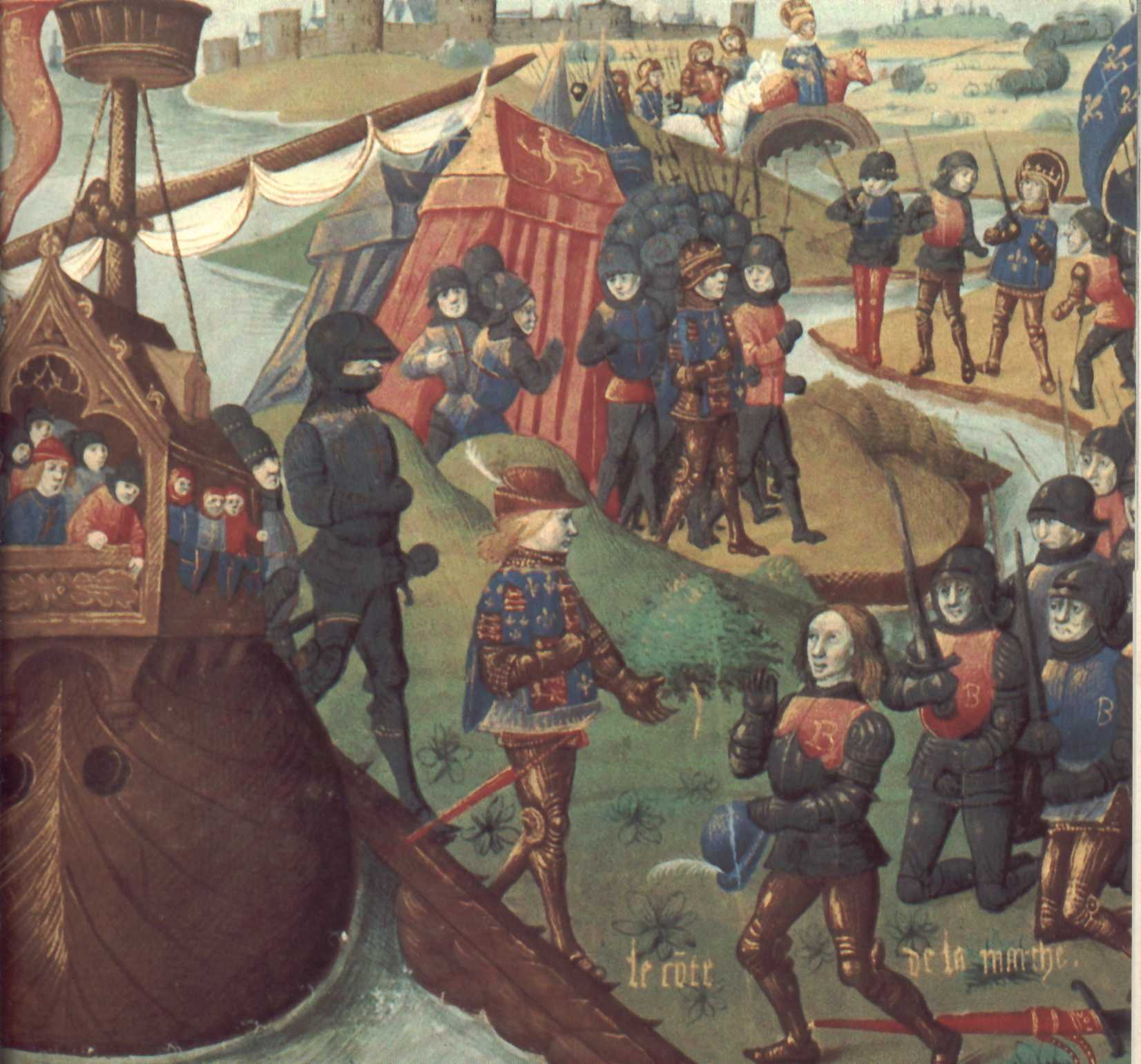
Henry III of England landing in Aquitaine. Boniface was the uncle by marriage of the king.

Boniface was the Prior of Nantua in 1232 along with the bishopric of Belley in Burgundy. When his father died, he received the castle of Ugine as his inheritance, and he surrendered any entitlement to any other inheritance in 1238. After the marriage of his niece, Eleanor of Provence to King Henry III of England, he came with a number of her relatives to England.

Henry attempted to have Boniface elected Bishop of Winchester but was unable to get the cathedral chapter to elect Boniface. On 1 February 1241 he was nominated to the see of Canterbury. Pope Innocent IV confirmed the appointment on 16 September 1243, as an attempt to placate Henry. Boniface did not, however, come to England until 1244 and was present, in the following year 1245, at the First Council of Lyon. There, he was consecrated by Innocent IV on 15 January at Lyons, but it was only in 1249 that he returned to England and was enthroned at Canterbury Cathedral on 1 November 1249. Before he returned in 1249, he helped arrange the marriage another of his nieces, Beatrice of Provence, the sister of Queen Eleanor, to Charles of Anjou, the brother of King Louis IX of France.

The medieval chronicler Matthew Paris said that Boniface was "noted more for his birth than for his brains." He showed little concern for the spiritual duties of his office. His exactions and his overbearing behaviour, combined with the fact that he was a foreigner, offended the English. He was heavily involved in advancing the fortunes of his family on the continent and spent fourteen of the twenty-nine years he was archbishop outside England. He made strenuous efforts to free his office from debt, as he had inherited a see that was in debt over 22,000 marks, but managed to clear the debt before his death. He did this by securing the right to tax his clergy, for seven years, from the papacy. When a number of bishops refused to pay, they were suspended from office. He also worked for the canonisation of Edmund of Abingdon while he was at the papal court-in-exile at Lyon from 1244 to 1249.

In 1244, Boniface rejected Robert Passelewe, who had been selected as Bishop of Chichester, because Passelewe was illiterate. Boniface then nominated his own candidate, Richard of Chichester, and although the king objected, Pope Innocent IV confirmed Richard's election. In 1258, Boniface objected to the selection of Hugh de Balsham as Bishop of Ely, and tried to elevate Adam Marsh instead, but Hugh appealed to Rome, which upheld Hugh's election. Boniface held church councils to reform the clergy, in 1257 at London, in 1258 at Merton, and in 1261 at Lambeth.

During his archiepiscopate, a provincial court was established in the archdiocese of Canterbury, with a presiding Officialis appointed by Boniface.

== Controversies ==
Boniface was energetic in defending the liberties of his see, and clashed with King Henry over the election of Henry's clerk Robert Passelewe to the see of Chichester. Robert Grosseteste, the Bishop of Lincoln, had examined Passelewe and found him unfit for episcopal office, and Boniface then quashed the election in 1244. He was also involved in disputes with the king's half-brothers, especially Aymer de Valence, who was Bishop of Winchester. He also quarrelled with his suffragan bishops, who resented his attempts to supervise their affairs closely. In 1250, Boniface attempted a visitation of his province, and this disturbed his suffragan bishops, who protested that Boniface was taking exorbitant amounts of money during his visits. They appealed to the pope, who reaffirmed the right of Boniface to conduct his visitation but set a limit on the amount that could be taken from any monastery or church. After the visitation, Boniface left England again and only returned in 1252, after the pope had decided the bishops' appeal in Boniface's favour. After his return, he continued to assert his rights and settled a number of disputes with his bishops. He secured professions of obedience from all but three of the 37 bishops consecrated during his time as archbishop. He also set up a court at Canterbury that heard appeals from the ecclesiastical courts of his suffragan bishops.

Boniface clashed with Henry's half-brothers, the Lusignans, who arrived in England in 1247 and competed for lands and promotions with the queens' Savoy relatives. Boniface's quarrel with Aymer de Valence over a hospital in Southwark led to the archbishop's palace at Lambeth being plundered and one of Boniface's functionaries being kidnapped. The dispute with Aymer was only settled in early 1253. Boniface was once more absent from England from October 1254 to November 1256, and spent most of that time in Savoy, where he attempted to help his brothers rescue their eldest brother Thomas, who was being held captive at Turin.

In 1258 and 1259, Boniface was a member of the Council of Fifteen, which conducted business for Henry III under the Provisions of Oxford. This Council consisted of the earls of Leicester, Gloucester, Norfolk, Warwick, Hereford, the Count of Aumale, Peter of Savoy, John fitzGeoffrey, Peter de Montfort, Richard Grey, Roger Mortimer, James Audley, John Maunsell, Walter de Cantilupe, Bishop of Worcester as well as Boniface. One of the actions of this council was to send the Lusignans into exile. In April 1260, Boniface worked with Richard of Cornwall to broker a peace between King Henry and Prince Edward.

Boniface accompanied the queen and Prince Edward to Burgos for the marriage of Edward to Eleanor of Castile and Edward's knighting. But in 1261 Boniface held a church council at Lambeth, where a series of ecclesiastical laws were published which denounced any royal limitations on ecclesiastical courts. These decrees were done without royal consent and thus was tantamount to an ecclesiastical revolt against royal authority similar to the baronial opposition movement that had begun in 1258.

During the Second Barons' War, Boniface seems to have sided first with the English bishops against King Henry, but later he sided with Henry. In 1262, he went to France, excommunicating the barons opposing the king. He was not summoned to the Parliament at London in January 1265 because he was abroad. On the triumph of the king's party in 1265, he returned to England, arriving there in May 1266.

== Death and aftermath ==
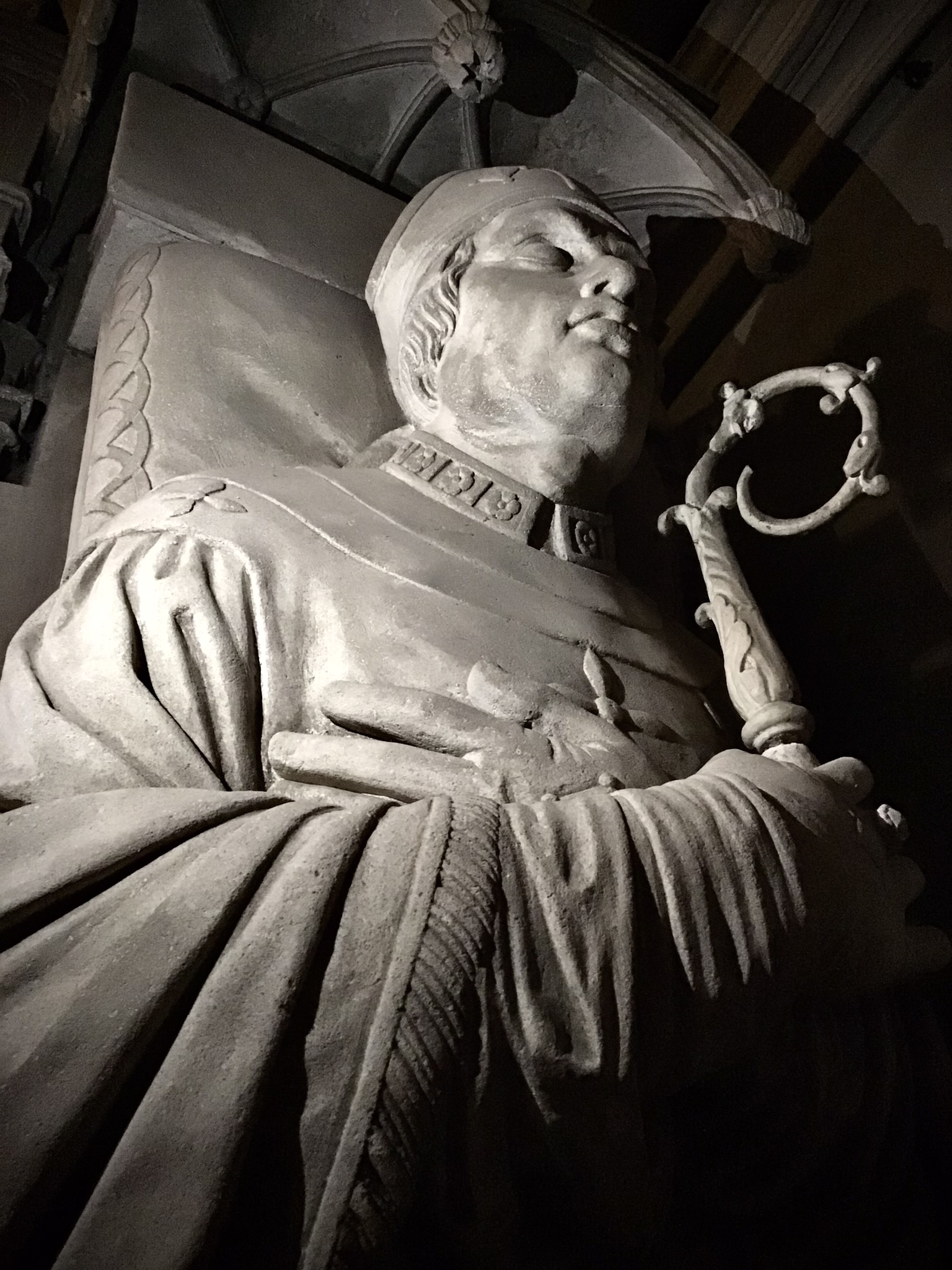
The nineteenth century tomb of Boniface de Savoie at the Abbaye d’Hautecombe

The Early English Gothic chapel of Lambeth Palace dates from work carried out while Boniface was archbishop. Boniface left England in November 1268 and never returned. He died 18 July 1270, in Savoy. He was buried with his family in the Cistercian abbey of Hautecombe in Savoy. In his will, he left legacies to all the houses of the Franciscans and Dominicans in the diocese of Canterbury. His will had differing provisions for his burial depending on whether he died in England, France, or near the Alps. Oddly enough, his official seal included a head of the pagan god Jupiter Serapis along with the usual depiction of the archbishop in full vestments.

After his death, Boniface's tomb was the center of a cult, and when the tomb was opened in 1580, his body was found to be perfectly preserved. The tomb and effigy were destroyed in the French Revolution, his remains were reburied, and a new tomb was built in 1839. He was beatified by Pope Gregory XVI in 1839, and his feast day is 4 July.

Although Matthew Paris disapproved of Boniface, modern historians have seen him as a responsible archbishop. The historian D. A. Carpenter says that Boniface "became a respected and reforming archbishop". His episcopal registers do not survive.

== Citations ==
Catholic Church titles
Preceded by Edmund of Abingdon	Archbishop of Canterbury; 1241–1270	Succeeded by Robert Kilwardby (William Chillenden chosen but set aside by the Pope)
