= Blanche of Sicily =

Sicilian princess (died 1269/70)

- Died: 1269/1270
- Spouse: Robert of Béthune (m. 1265)
- Issue: Charles
- House: Anjou-Sicily
- Father: Charles I of Sicily
- Mother: Beatrice of Provence

A drawing of Blanche of Sicily, 1600

Blanche of Sicily, also called Blanche of Anjou (c. ? – 1269/1270), was the eldest surviving child born to Charles of Anjou and his first wife, Beatrice, the reigning Countess of Provence and Forcalquier. She later married Robert, the future Count of Flanders.

== Life ==
Blanche was the eldest child of Charles of Anjou and Beatrice of Provence, who inherited the counties of Provence and Forcalquier in 1245 from her father. Blanche's siblings included Charles II, King of Naples; Beatrice, Latin Empress; Philip and Elizabeth, Queen of Hungary. In 1266, her father was installed as King of Sicily by Pope Clement IV, founding the Capetian House of Anjou.

In 1265, Blanche married Robert of Béthune. This union appears to have been happy, and they had one son together, named Charles, who died young. During his life, he was betrothed to Isabella, daughter of Hugh IV, Duke of Burgundy and Beatrice of Navarre. She would go on to become Queen of Germany as the wife of Rudolf I.

Blanche herself died either in 1269 or 1270, (Note: Although some sources say that Blanche died in 1269, The French in the Kingdom of Sicily, 1266–130 claims the year 1270.) four years after her marriage. Her husband would go on to become the Count of Flanders long after her death. He had Blanche buried in Flines, and her tomb clearly displayed the alliance between Flanders and Sicily: King Charles and Queen Beatrice are prominently featured on it. Robert would further demonstrate his alliance with Sicily, choosing Yolande of Burgundy, the sister of Charles of Anjou's second consort Margaret, as his second wife.

== Sources ==
- Beullens, Pieter (2023). The Friar and the Philosopher: William of Moerbeke and the Rise of Aristotle’s Science in Medieval Europe. Routledge.
- Dunbabin, Jean (1998). Charles I of Anjou. Power, Kingship and State-Making in Thirteenth-Century Europe. Bloomsbury. ISBN 978-1-78093-767-0.
- Dunbabin, Jean (2011). The French in the Kingdom of Sicily, 1266–1305. Cambridge University Press. ISBN 9781139500081.
- Toynbee, Margaret R. (1929). S. Louis of Toulouse and the Process of Canonisation in the Fourteenth Century. Manchester University Press.
