= Philip, Count Palatine of Burgundy =

Philip, Count Palatine of Burgundy may refer to:

- Philip I of Savoy, consort Count Palatine of Burgundy as second husband of Adelaide, Countess Palatine of Burgundy
- Philip V of France, consort Count Palatine of Burgundy as husband of Joan II, Countess Palatine of Burgundy
- Philip I, Duke of Burgundy, grandson and heir of Joan III, Countess Palatine of Burgundy
- Philip II, Duke of Burgundy, consort Count Palatine of Burgundy as husband of Margaret II, Countess Palatine of Burgundy, great-granddaughter of Joan II
- Philip III, Duke of Burgundy, grandson of previous, Count Palatine of Burgundy 1419-67
- Philip I, Archduke of Austria, Count Palatine of Burgundy 1482–1506, as son and heir of Mary of Burgundy, granddaughter of previous
- Philip II of Spain, grandson of previous; after him, kings of Spain were Counts of Palatine until the French conquered the county
