= Romée de Villeneuve =

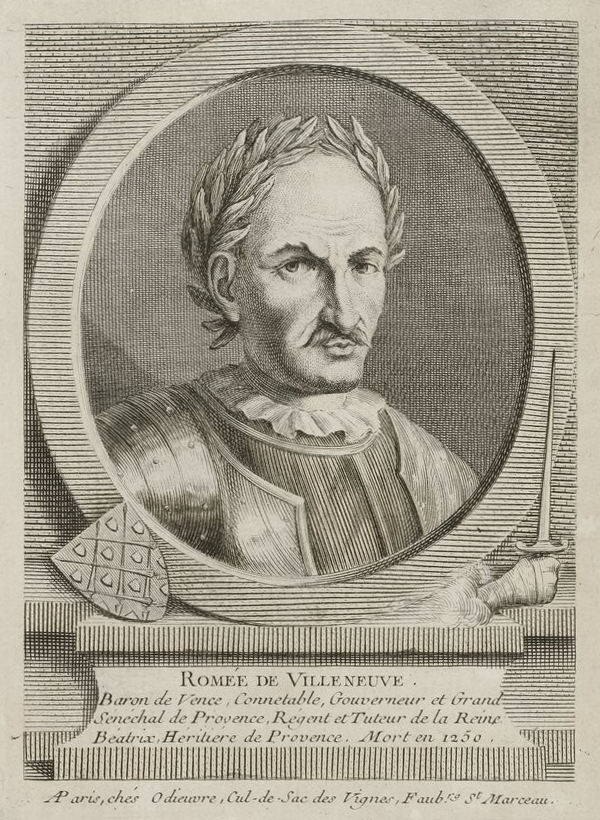
Romée de Villeneuve, baron de Vence.

Romée de Villeneuve (c. 1170 – c. 1250) was a constable and seneschal of Provence.

== Biography ==
In 1230, he commissioned the Château de Nice. In 1230 the Chateau de Montfort became the property of Romee de Villeneuve. In 1234, he founded Villeneuve-Loubet and commissioned the Château de Villeneuve-Loubet.

Following the death of Ramon Berenguer IV, Count of Provence, he inherited Vence, became Beatrice of Provence's guardian and the regent of Provence.

He was buried in Nice.

He appears also in the Divina Commedia, by Dante Alighieri, in Paradise, in canto VI, in the sphere of Mercury. Dante describes him as:

"Within this very pearl shines
the shining light of Romeo,
whose great and noble work was poorly paid.
But those of Provence who schemed against him
have not had the last laugh—he takes an evil road
to whom another's good deed seems a wrong.
'Raymond Berenger had four daughters,
each of them a queen, and Romeo, a man
of little standing and a stranger, made that happen.
'And when malicious tongues moved Raymond
to go over accounts with this just man,
who had rendered him seven plus five for ten,
Romeo left there, poor in his old age.
And, if the world knew the heart he had within
when, crust by crust, he begged his bread,
much as it praises him, it would praise him more."

—Paradiso, Canto VI, lines 127-142

== Legacy ==
- The Place Romée de Villeneuve in Aix-en-Provence is named for him.
- The Collège Romée de Villeneuve in Villeneuve-Loubet is named for him.
