= Beatrice of Provence =

Countess of Provence and Forcalquier (c.1229–1267)

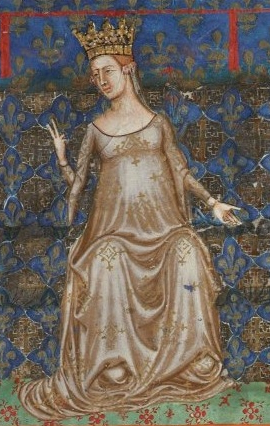
- 14th-century miniature of Queen Beatrice from the Bible of Naples

Countess of Provence and Forcalquier
- Reign: 19 August 1245 – 23 September 1267
- Predecessor: Ramon Berenguer V, Count of Provence
- Successor: Charles II

Queen consort of Sicily
- Tenure: 26 February 1266 – 23 September 1267
- Born: c. 1229
- Died: 23 September 1267 (aged 37–38)
- Spouse: Charles I of Sicily (m. 1246)
- Issue more...: Blanche; Beatrice, Latin Empress; Charles II, King of Naples; Philip; Elizabeth, Queen of Hungary
- House: Barcelona
- Father: Ramon Berenguer V, Count of Provence
- Mother: Beatrice of Savoy

Beatrice of Provence (c. 1229 – 23 September 1267), was the ruling Countess of Provence and Forcalquier from 1245 until her death, as well as Countess of Anjou and Maine and Queen of Sicily by marriage to Charles I of Naples.

Beatrice was the fourth and youngest daughter of Ramon Berenguer V, Count of Provence and Beatrice, daughter of Count Thomas I of Savoy and Margaret of Geneva.

== Life ==
=== Inheritance of Provence and Forcalquier ===
Beatrice, like her sisters, mother and grandmother was known for her beauty. A description of Beatrice said she

"set men's hearts thumping and the fingers of troubadours to fevered twanging of lyres. Two of the balladists at the Provencal court were temporarily deprived of reason for love of the entrancing Beatrice"

All Ramon Berenguer's three older daughters married to titles of status: The eldest, Margaret, was Queen of France by marriage to Louis IX; the second, Eleanor, was Queen of England by marriage to Henry III, and the third, Sanchia, was titular Queen of Germany by marriage to Henry's brother Richard, Earl of Cornwall. King Louis IX's marriage to Margaret had been arranged by his mother, Blanche of Castile, with the hopes that he would inherit Provence and Forcalquier when her father died.

In his will signed on 20 June 1238 at Sisteron, Ramon Berenguer unexpectedly left the Counties of Provence and Forcalquier to his youngest and still unmarried daughter, Beatrice.

=== Countess of Provence and Forcalquier ===
Beatrice's father, Ramon Berenguer, died on 19 August 1245 at Aix-en-Provence, and according to his will, Beatrice became Countess of Provence and Forcalquier in her own right, with the provision that the Dowager Countess could retain the usufruct of the County of Provence for her lifetime.

Beatrice became one of the most attractive heiresses in medieval Europe, and soon several suitors appeared for her hand. Firstly, the neighboring rulers of her domains began their claims: the twice-divorced Raymond VII, Count of Toulouse and King James I of Aragon, who, despite being married to Violant of Hungary, invaded Provence and seized the residence of the countess. In addition, the thrice-widowed Frederick II, Holy Roman Emperor, dispatched the imperial navy to Provence to ensure Beatrice could marry one of his sons or even himself.

In such a difficult situation, the Dowager Countess decided to act quickly, placing herself and Beatrice in a safe fortress in Aix, secured the trust of its people and then asked Pope Innocent IV for his protection. In Cluny during December 1245, a secret meeting between Pope Innocent IV, Louis IX of France, his mother Blanche of Castile, and his youngest brother Charles took place. It was decided that in return for Louis IX supporting the Pope militarily against Frederick II, the Pope would allow that Charles marry Beatrice. Mother and daughter were satisfied with this selection, but under the terms of the treaty, Provence was to never go to France outright through Charles. It was agreed that if Charles and Beatrice had children, the Counties would go to them; if there was no issue, then the Provence and Forcalquier would go to Sanchia of Provence, and if she died without heirs, the Counties would go to the King of Aragon. Henry III of England protested these terms, arguing that he had not yet received the full dowry for his wife Eleanor nor his brother for Sanchia. He also still had the castles in Provence against the loan he had made to the late Count.

Charles, along with Philip of Savoy and five hundred knights, rode from Lyon to Provence. On their way, they ran into Raymond VII of Toulouse, who also had an army on the way to Provence. Raymond VII had been deceived by knights in favour of Charles and for that reason he had brought fewer men, and Charles and his army were quicker. When Charles got to Aix-en-Provence, James I of Aragon, who had been there all along but was not allowed to see Beatrice, had his soldiers surrounding the castle in which the young Beatrice and her mother were. There was a brief struggle, but the King of Aragon retreated with dignity.

To the young Beatrice, Charles (who was described as "an admirable young man") was a satisfactory resolution to her problems. Their marriage took place on 31 January 1246 at Aix-en-Provence. They had soldiers on guard and the bride was escorted down the aisle by her uncle, Thomas, Count of Flanders.

The inheritance of Beatrice also caused conflicts with her older sisters, who hoped that once their father had died, his domains would be divided between the four; Charles refused to share the Counties with his sisters-in-law. In consequence, the relationship of Charles and Beatrice with the three sisters, who felt cheated by their father's will, remained always tense.

As soon as Charles became Count of Provence, he brought in his own team of French lawyers and accountants. He excluded his mother-in-law from the running of the county and began taking castles, power and fees away from the nobles who had previously enjoyed a certain degree of independence in the running of their cities. Charles made himself very unpopular. The Dowager Countess moved herself to Forcalquier in protest, and in Marseille, Charles's officials were thrown out of the city. In the family conflict, Beatrice sided with her husband.

==== Seventh Crusade ====
In May 1247, Charles and Beatrice were recorded as being in Melun, where Charles was knighted by his brother Louis. Beatrice accompanied Charles on the Seventh Crusade in 1248. Led by Louis IX, the crusaders made an extended procession through France. Before they left, Charles and Beatrice met with the Dowager Countess in Beaucaire to try to come to some terms of agreement concerning Provence. Whilst the more important matters were left until Charles and Beatrice returned, it was decided that Beatrice of Savoy would give up the rights to "the castle at Aix in exchange for a percentage of the county's revenue."

In Nicosia, Beatrice gave birth to her first child, "a very elegant and wellformed son", as her brother-in-law Robert of Artois wrote home to his mother the Queen; the child lived only a few days. Beatrice stayed with her sister Margaret in Damietta, when they lost contact with the King and his army; here Beatrice gave birth to her second child, while her sister Margaret too gave birth. Later in 1250, they were reunited with the rest of the crusade at Acre, where the King's ransom was paid. Charles and Beatrice, along with several other nobles, left soon after and journeyed to the court of Emperor Frederick II, to ask him to send the King of France more men for his crusade. The Emperor, who had been excommunicated, needed his army to fight the Pope, and refused.

Beatrice and Charles returned to Provence in 1251, where some riots erupted at Arles and Avignon, instigated by Beatrice's mother, who felt Charles had failed to respect her claims in Provence. By July 1252 Charles had managed to defeat the revolt and was in the process of exercising his power as Count of Provence. In November of the same year, Blanche of Castile, regent of France while her son Louis IX was on crusade, died. Charles and Beatrice had to go to Paris, where Charles became co-regent of France with his brother, Alphonse. The Pope offered Charles the Kingdom of Sicily in 1252, but Charles had to turn the offer down, as he was preoccupied with other affairs and he also did not have sufficient funds.

The crusaders returned in 1254. Charles and Beatrice spent Christmas in Paris that year, where all of Beatrice's sisters and their mother were present; it was noted that the other four women treated the younger Beatrice coldly, due to Raymond Berenguer's will.

=== Queen of Sicily ===
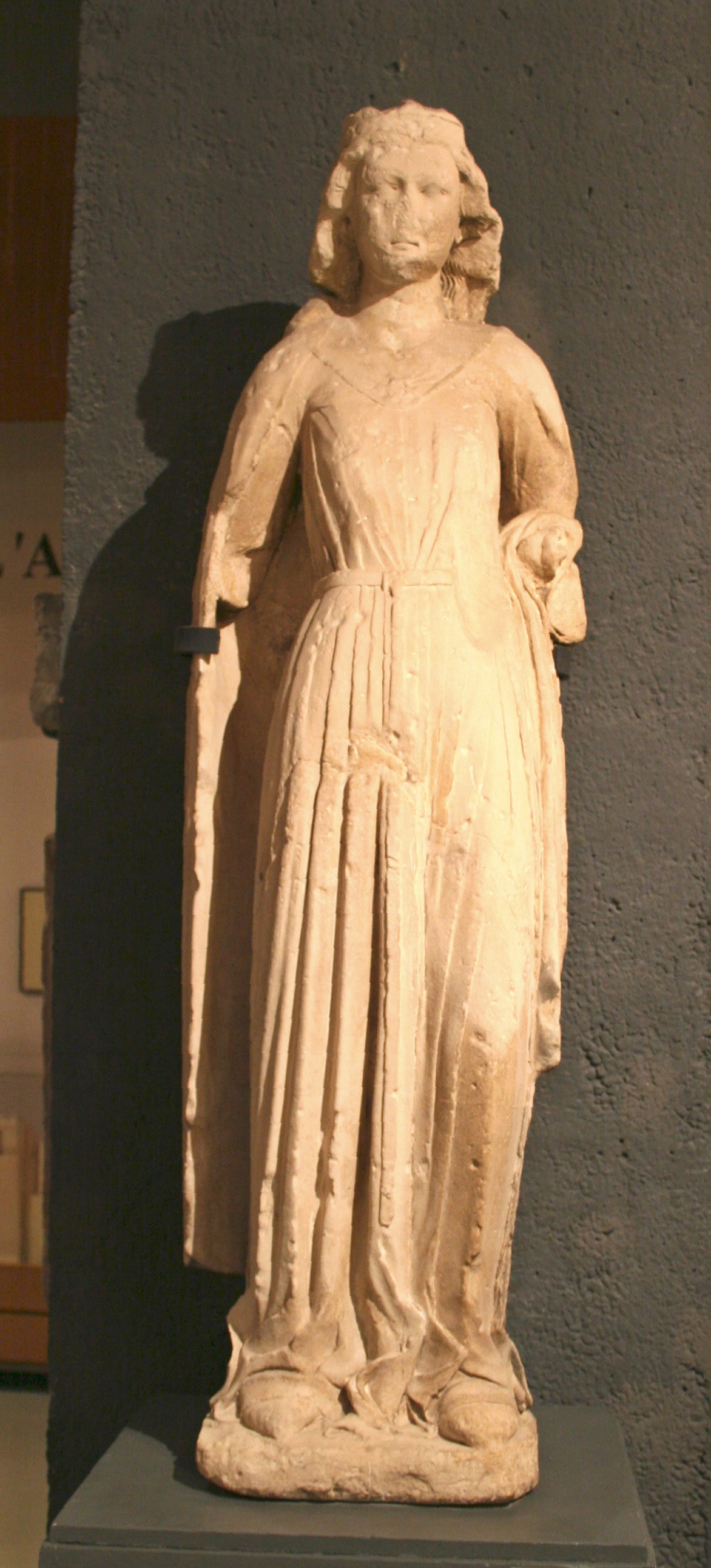
Statue of Beatrice of Provence, 13th century. Currently displayed at the Musée d'histoire de Marseille.

Beatrice's sister Margaret, the new Queen of France, publicly offended her in 1259, by not seating her at the family table; she claimed because Beatrice was not a queen like her sisters, she could not sit with them. Margaret had hoped to provoke her sister in treacherous behaviour so she would have a valid reason to invade Provence. Beatrice "with great grief", went to Charles and he reportedly told her:

"Be at peace, for I will shortly make thee a greater Queen than them".

When the newly elected Pope Clement IV granted Charles the Kingdom of Sicily, he had to defeat King Manfred, who had fallen out of papal favour. Another contender to win the throne of Sicily was Beatrice's nephew, Edmund Crouchback, but it soon became clear that Charles was the more promising candidate. In order to achieve his goal, Charles needed an army and Beatrice helped her husband raise one. She called on all her knights as well as the young men of France, and according to the later historian Angelo di Costanzo she pledged all her jewels, to make sure they joined her husband's army:

Beatrice, to aid [Charles] in the gratification of her ambition, sold all her jewels and personal ornaments, and expended her private treasure in collecting round her standard, not only her own vassals, but the chivalric youth of France, who were attracted to her service not less by her personal solicitations than by her rich gifts.

In 1265 Charles of Anjou, with a small contingent, embarked and by sea arrived in Rome, where, on 28 June, he was invested as King of Sicily by the Pope. According to the storia di Manfredi, re di Sicilia e di Puglia of Giuseppe di Cesare who followed the narrative of the storia di Saba Malaspina, Beatrice followed her husband with the remaining army by sea, arriving to Italy only four months later. In November of that year, the army of Charles, composed by 5,000 soldiers and 25,000 infantrymen entered Italy and arrived in Rome in January 1266, where on 6 January both Charles and Beatrice were crowned King and Queen of Sicily by five cardinals sent by the Pope (who was sheltering in Perugia). As soon as the coronation festivities had ended, Beatrice stayed in Rome with a small force to hold the city, whilst Charles rode out to the battle of Benevento. After her husband's victory, she chose the castle of Melfi as their residence.

=== Death ===
Beatrice died on 23 September 1267, a little over a year after becoming queen in either the Castello del Parco at Nocera Inferiore or in Naples (according to the storia di Saba Malaspina). The cause of her death was not recorded, although it is believed that complications following a pregnancy could be the reason. She was initially buried at Cathedral of San Gennaro in Naples, but in 1277 her husband transferred her remains to Aix-en-Provence at the Church of Saint-Jean-de-Malta.

Beatrice was the last ruling Countess of Provence and Forcalquier from the House of Barcelona; on her death, she left her Counties to her husband Charles.

== Issue ==
Charles and Beatrice had the following children:

- Blanche (1250 – bef. 10 January 1270), married in 1265 Robert of Flanders, Lord of Béthune and Dendermonde
- Beatrice (1252 – 17 November/12 December 1275), married in 1273 Philip of Courtenay, titular emperor of Constantinople
- Charles II (1254 – 6 May 1309), Count of Anjou and Provence, King of Naples, married Maria of Hungary
- Philippe (1256 – 1 January 1277), titular King of Thessalonica from 1274 and Prince of Achaïea, married in 1271 Isabella of Villehardouin, Princess of Achaïea and Morea
- Robert (1258 – bef. 9 May 1265).
- Isabelle (1261 – October 1303), married to Ladislaus IV of Hungary

== Ancestry ==
Ancestors of Beatrice of Provence

8. Alfonso II of Aragon
4. Alfonso II, Count of Provence
9. Sancha of Castile
2. Ramon Berenguer IV, Count of Provence
10. Renier of Sabran
5. Garsenda of Forcalquier
11. Garsenda of Forcalquier
1. Beatrice of Provence
12. Humbert III, Count of Savoy
6. Thomas I, Count of Savoy
13. Beatrice of Viennois
3. Beatrice of Savoy
14. William I of Geneva
7. Marguerite of Geneva
15. Beatrix of Faucigny

== Sources ==
- Abulafia, David (1995). The New Cambridge Medieval History. Vol. 5, C.1198 – c.1300. Cambridge: Cambridge University Press. ISBN 0-521-36289-X.
- Bruzelius, Caroline Astrid (2004). The Stones of Naples: Church Building in Angevin Italy, 1266-1343. Yale University Press.
- Cox, Eugene L. (1974). The Eagles of Savoy. Princeton: Princeton University Press. ISBN 0-691-05216-6.
- Davin, Emmanuel (June 1963). "Béatrice de Savoie, Comtesse de Provence, mère de quatre reines (1198–1267)". Bulletin de l'Association Guillaume Budé (in French). 1 (2): 176–189. doi:10.3406/bude.1963.4029.
- Dunbabin, Jean (2014). Charles I of Anjou: Power, Kingship and State-Making in Thirteenth-Century Europe. Routledge.
- Gee, Loveday Lewes (2002). Women, Art, and Patronage from Henry III to Edward III: 1216-1377. The Boydell Press.
- Hopkins, T.C.F. (2008). Empires, Wars, and Battles: The Middle East from Antiquity to the Rise of the New World. Macmillan. p. 174. ISBN 978-1-4668-4171-0.
- The Plantagenets, The Magnificent Century, Thomas B Costain 1951
- Runciman, Steven (1958). The Sicilian Vespers: A History of the Mediterranean World in the Later Thirteenth Century. London: Cambridge University Press. OCLC 315065012.
- Toynbee, Margaret R. (1929). S. Louis of Toulouse and the Process of Canonisation in the Fourteenth Century. Manchester University Press.
- Lane Poole, Austin: The Interregnum in Germany in: History of the Medieval World, vol. V, 1999, pp. 128–152.
- Petit-Dutaillis, Charles: Louis IX the Saint in: History of the Medieval World, vol. V, 1999, pp. 829–864.
- Johnstone, Hilda: France: the last Capetians, in: History of the Medieval World, vol. VI, 1999, pp. 569–607.
- Previté-Orton: Italy in the second half of the 13th century, in: History of the Medieval World, vol. V, 1999, pp. 198–244.

Beatrice of Provence House of Barcelona Cadet branch of the Bellonids Born: c. 1229 Died: 23 September 1267
Regnal titles
| Preceded by Ramon Berenguer IV | Countess of Provence and Forcalquier; 19 August 1245 – 23 September 1267 with Charles I (1246–1267) | Succeeded by Charles II |
Royal titles
| Preceded by Helena Angelina Doukaina | Queen consort of Sicily; 26 February 1266 – 23 September 1267 | Vacant Title next held by Margaret of Burgundy |
