= Amadeus I =

Amadeus I may refer to:

- Amadeo I of Spain (1845–1890), King of Spain from 1870 to 1873, also known as Amadeus
- Amadeus I, Count of Savoy (c. 975–c. 1052)
- Amadeus I, Count of Geneva (1098–1178)
