= Savoyard faction =

The Savoyards were a faction in the royal court of Henry III of England made up of relatives and retainers of his queen Eleanor of Provence, who was the daughter of Beatrice of Savoy.

The primary reason for the marriage between Henry and Eleanor was political, as Henry stood to create a valuable set of alliances with the rulers of the south and south-east of France.

The most prominent of these were Eleanor's uncles particularly William of Savoy, Henry's chief adviser for a short period who had originally suggested the marriage and established Eleanor in England. Another uncle was the later Archbishop Boniface of Canterbury. Her uncle Peter was given the Honour of Richmond and was granted land between the Strand and the Thames, where Peter built the Savoy Palace in 1263, on the site of the present Savoy Hotel and Savoy Theatre.

As well as her uncles Eleanor brought in her retinue a large number of cousins and other retainers, known as the Savoyards. At least 170 Savoyards arrived in England after 1236, coming from Savoy, Burgundy, and Flanders of whom around 70 settled. Henry arranged marriages for many of them into the English nobility, a practice that initially caused friction with the English barons, who resisted landed estates passing into the hands of foreigners.

They would later be opposed to the Lusignan faction of Henry's Poitevin half brothers. Many Savoyards, probably including Eleanor, backed a 1258 coup d'état by a coalition of English barons who expelled the Poitevins from England, reforming the royal government through a process called the Provisions of Oxford.

The Savoyard's influence with the King created friction with the English barons during Henry's reign. The Savoyards were careful not to exacerbate the situation and became increasingly integrated into English baronial society, forming an important power base for Eleanor in England.

When Henry seized power from the barons in 1261 his government relied primarily on Eleanor and her Savoyard supporters, although it proved short-lived.

Henry and Eleanor's son Edward I was close to many Savoyards. During his reign he would rely on a number of Savoyard knights in the Welsh Wars, largely due to his childhood friendship with the Savoyard Otto de Grandson.

== Bibliography ==
- Arnold-Baker, Charles (2015). von Blumenthal, Henry (ed.). The Companion to British History. Routledge.
- Carpenter, David A. (2004). The Struggle for Mastery: The Penguin History of Britain 1066–1284. London: Penguin. ISBN 978-0-14-014824-4.
- Costain, Thomas B. (1959). The Magnificent Century. Garden City, New York: Doubleday and Company.
- Cox, Eugene L. (1974). The Eagles of Savoy. Princeton: Princeton University Press. ISBN 0691052166.
- Howell, Margaret (2001). Eleanor of Provence: Queenship in Thirteenth-Century England. Oxford: Blackwell Publishers. ISBN 978-0-631-22739-7.
- Howell, Margaret (2004). "Eleanor (Eleanor of Provence) (c.1223–1291), queen of England". Oxford Dictionary of National Biography. Oxford Dictionary of National Biography (online ed.). Oxford: Oxford University Press. doi:10.1093/ref:odnb/8620. (Subscription or UK public library membership required.)
- Jobson, Adrian (2012). The First English Revolution: Simon de Montfort, Henry III and the Barons' War. London: Bloomsbury. ISBN 978-1-84725-226-5.
- Ridgeway, Huw (1988). "King Henry III and the 'Aliens', 1236–1272". In Coss, Peter R.; Lloyd, Simon D. (eds.). Thirteenth Century England: Proceedings of the Newcastle upon Tyne Conference, 1987. Vol. 2. Woodbridge: Boydell Press. pp. 81–92. ISBN 978-0-85115-513-5.
- Ridgeway, Huw (1989). "Foreign Favourites and Henry III's Problems of Patronage, 1247-1258". English Historical Review.
