= William II of Geneva =

Count of Geneva (died 1252)

William II (died 25 November 1252) was the Count of Geneva, originally a usurper, from 1225 until his death. He fought a long series of wars with the House of Savoy and lost control of all of his county outside of the traditional Genevois and saw his influence over the city of Geneva proper and the Bishop of Geneva severely reduced.

== Usurping the county ==
William was the second son of Count William I of Geneva (died 1195) and Béatrix de Faucigny (died 1196). He was a younger half-brother of Count Humbert I of Geneva. When Humbert died in November 1225, William seized the county and expelled Humbert's sons, his nephews, Peter and Ebal, who eventually found protection under Peter le Petit Charlemagne, who had brought them with him to England by 1244. That year Peter, the elder, married a rich English heiress, Mathilda de Lacy. Peter le Petit Charlemagne was in fact William's nephew, a son of his sister Margaret.

In September 1229 at Tournon William was one of the arbiters of a dispute between the Bishop of Valence, William of Savoy, who was a brother of le Petit Charlemagne, and the citizens of Valence. In 1234, he had his second son, Amadeus, installed as a canon in the Diocese of Lausanne. In 1239, Amadeus was successful in leading the pro-Genevan party over the pro-Savoyard in the episcopal election which placed Jean de Cossonay on the bishop's seat.

== Conflict with Peter le Petit Charlemagne ==
In 1236–37, Aymon, Baron of Faucigny, made himself protector of the priory of Chamonix despite the fact that the count of Geneva had a prior right. The ensuing war, in which Aymon's son-in-law, le Petit Charlemagne, was captured by William's son Rudolf, resulted in Genevan defeat, for on 13 May 1237 William II was forced to accept the judgement of Peter's brother, Amadeus IV, Count of Savoy, condemning him to an indemnity of 20,000 marks and the cession of the strategic Castle Arlod on the Rhône near its confluence with the Valserine, which commanded the approach to the Lyonnais. The sum of 20,000 marks was beyond William's ability to pay and the value of the fortress he was compelled to give up too high. The count of Geneva and Peter continued to be at war intermittently for the next five years. In 1242 William and le Petit Charlemagne fought a final brief war for control of Arlod. On 26 August, however, meeting his adversary "in front of Arlod", he was forced to cede it.

In 1250 William II went to war again against le Petit Charlemagne in an effort to check his expansion in the pays de Vaud. Although no contemporary source describes the course of the war, it is evident that William was defeated. He lost the fortress of Les Clées, which commanded the pass into Burgundy, and that of Bourg-du-Four in the centre of Geneva. He was also forced to accept the arbitration of Peter's brother, Philip, Archbishop of Lyon, who in turn imposed a "Carthagenian settlement" on 28 June: the count was forced to cede to Peter a large gagerie as security against the payment of an indemnity set at 10,000 marks, which was half of the indemnity ordered in 1237. The gagerie comprised the castles of Geneva, Les Clées, Charousse, Ballaison, Rue; the homages of the Count of Gruyére and of the lords of Langin, Oron and Vufflens; and all the jurisdictions William possessed in the Pays de Vaud, the Chablais and in Faucigny, between the Arve and the Dranse and between the Cluse de Gex and the Pont de Bargen. By this concession the once powerful county of Geneva was reduced to little more than the Genevois. The archbishop further intervened in the dispute between William and Peter over Arlod, deciding that it should remain in Peter's possession until an inquiry could determine if it pertained to the sire of Gex or to the prior of Nantua, who happened at that time to be Boniface, brother of Peter and Philip.

== Marriage and children ==
William II married Alice de La Tour du Pin. He died at Domène on 25 November 1252 and was succeeded by his eldest son, Rudolf, while his younger son, Henry, received the fortresses of Vuache and Ternier. Besides his sons Rudolf, Amadeus and Henry, William II had four others. One Savoyard Renaissance historian described William II as “quarrelsome”.

== Bibliography ==
- Eugene L. Cox. The Eagles of Savoy: The House of Savoy in Thirteenth-Century Europe. Princeton, New Jersey: Princeton University Press, 1974.

Preceded by Humbert I of Geneva	Count of Geneva; 1220–1252	Succeeded by Rudolf of Geneva
