= Margaret of Geneva =

Countess of Savoy

- Countess
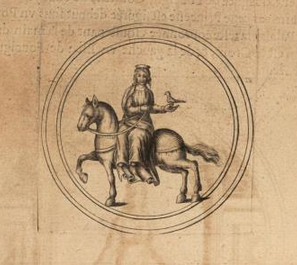
- Margaret of Geneva
- Predecessor: Beatrice of Viennois
- Successor: Margaret of Burgundy, Countess of Savoy
- Born: c. 1179; Geneva, Switzerland
- Died: c. 1258; Paris, Kingdom of France
- Spouse: Thomas I of Savoy
- Issue more...: Amadeus IV; Thomas ΙΙ; William of Savoy; Peter II; Philip I Boniface; Beatrice
- Father: William I, Count of Geneva
- Mother: Beatrice de Faucigny (c. 1160–1196)

Margaret of Geneva (c. 1179–c. 1258), was a countess of Savoy by marriage to Thomas I of Savoy. She was the daughter of William I, Count of Geneva, and Beatrice de Faucigny (1160–1196).

== Life ==
Margaret was supposed to become the third wife of Philip II of France. However, when her father was escorting her to France in May 1195, Thomas I of Savoy carried her off. Attracted by her beauty, Count Thomas then married her himself, claiming that Philip II was already married (the French King had married Ingeborg of Denmark in 1193 but had repudiated her soon thereafter). Margaret's father fell sick and died after the wedding, and her mother died the following year.

William I de Genève descendants

After her death, she was buried at Hautecombe Abbey in Savoy.

== Issue ==
The children of Marguerite and Thomas I of Savoy were:

- Amadeus IV of Savoy (1197–1253)
- Humbert (d. 1223)
- Thomas, Count of Flanders (c. 1199–1259), count in Piedmont
- Aimone (d. 1237), Lord of Chablais
- William of Savoy (d. 1239), Bishop of Valence and Dean of Vienne
- Peter II of Savoy (1203-1268), Earl of Richmond and later disputed count of Savoy
- Philip I of Savoy (1207-1285), archbishop of Lyon, later Count Palatine of Burgundy by marriage
- Boniface of Savoy, Archbishop of Canterbury (c. 1207–1270)
- Beatrice of Savoy (1205 – 4 January 1267), wife of Ramon Berenguer IV, Count of Provence.
- Margaret of Savoy (d. 1273), wife of Hartmann I of Kyburg

== Sources ==
- Cox, Eugene L. (1974). The Eagles of Savoy : The House of Savoy in Thirteenth-Century Europe. Princeton University Press.
- Pollock, M.A. (2015). Scotland, England and France after the Loss of Normandy, 1204-1296: 'Auld Amitie'. The Boydell Press.

Preceded by Beatrice of Viennois	Countess of Savoy; 1195–1233	Succeeded by Marguerite of Burgundy
