= Thomas III of Piedmont =

Italian noble (c. 1246–1282)

Coat of arms of the lordship and principality of Piedmont.

Count Thomas III (c. 1246 – 16 May 1282), called Thomas of Savoy or de Savoie, was the lord of Piedmont and a claimant to the county of Savoy from 1268.

He was the eldest son of Thomas II of Savoy and Beatrice di Fieschi, niece of Pope Innocent IV. Upon the death of his father, Thomas became Count in his paternal estates in Piedmont.

When his first cousin Boniface, Count of Savoy died in 1263, the 15-year-old Thomas regarded himself as the successor of the deceased, and claimed the county and the headship of the house. However, his late father's younger brother Peter II, Count of Savoy, a sonless nobleman who had resided in England for much of his life, was recognized as count. After Peter's death in 1268, Thomas continued his claim although Philip of Savoy, archbishop of Lyon, the youngest surviving brother of his father and also sonless, succeeded in the county and was recognized.

Thomas III, as he was the eldest son and heir of Thomas II, felt an injustice in being surpassed by younger brothers of his father, and claimed unsuccessfully Savoy from his uncles.

Thomas III married in 1274 to Guia of Burgundy, the stepdaughter of his uncle Philip I of Savoy and they had five children:

1. Philip, first of the line of Savoy-Achaea, lasting from 1285 to 1418
2. Peter
3. Thomas
4. Amadeus
5. William

Philip and Thomas were in dispute much of their reigns 1268–82. Thomas' marriage was a rather unsuccessful attempt to patch up things and get Philip to recognize hims as the successor in Savoy, which would have belonged to Thomas, him being the eldest son of Thomas II and thus the founder of the genealogically senior line of the House of Savoy. Philip's will charged his niece Eleanor of Provence and her son King Edward I of England with the inheritance of Savoy.

Thomas III was fatally wounded in a border dispute with Humbert I of Viennois in 1282.
