= William I of Geneva =

Count of Geneva (c. 1132–1195)

- Born: c. 1132
- Died: 25 July 1195; Château de Novel, Annecy, Savoyard state
- Noble family: House of Geneva
- Spouses: Marguerite Beatrice de Faucigny; Agnes of Savoy; Beatrice de Vaupergue
- Issue: Margaret of Geneva; William II of Geneva
- Father: Amadeus I of Geneva
- Mother: Matilda de Cuiseaux

William I of Geneva (c. 1132 – 25 July 1195) was Count of Geneva from 1178 to 1195. He was the son of Amadeus I, Count of Geneva and Matilda de Cuiseaux.

William I de Genève descendants

William married Agnes of Savoy. They had:

- Humbert

Following his first wife's death c. 1172, William married Marguerite Beatrice de Faucigny, they had:

- Marguerite of Geneva, wife of Thomas I of Savoy
- William II of Geneva

William's third marriage, to Beatrice de Vaupergue, his last wife, was childless. He died at the Château de Novel in Annecy, France.

== Sources ==
- Pollock, M.A. (2015). Scotland, England and France after the Loss of Normandy, 1204-1296: 'Auld Amitie'. The Boydell Press.
- Previte-Orton, C.W. (1912). The Early History of the House of Savoy: 1000–1233. Cambridge University Press.

Preceded by Amadeus I	Count of Geneva; 1178–1195	Succeeded by Humbert
