= Amadeus I of Geneva =

Count of Geneva (1098–1178)

- Count of Geneva
- Coat of arms of the Count of Geneva.
- Predecessor: Aymon I of Geneva
- Successor: William I of Geneva
- Full name: Amadeus I of Geneva
- Born: 1098
- Died: 1178 (aged 80)
- Noble family: House of Geneva
- Spouses: Matilde of Cuiseaux; Beatrice de Domène
- Issue: William I of Geneva
- Father: Aymon I of Geneva
- Mother: Ida de Faucigny

Amadeus I of Geneva (1098–1178) was count of Geneva. He succeeded his father in the county's government in 1128, and remained count of Geneva until his death in 1178. Amadeus was the son of Aymon I of Geneva (the preceding count) and of Ida de Faucigny.

== Biography ==
During his lifetime Amadeus I added the city of Annecy to his territories, thereby increasing the power of his County.

He also sought the protection of the House of Zähringen, after losing the rights to the dioceses of Sion, Lausanne and Geneva. Emperor Frederick Barbarossa in 1156 granted the rights to Berthold IV of Zähringen instead. However, Pope Alexander III took the bishop of Lausanne under his protection and superseded all claims to Lausanne, thereby reducing the power of the Duke of Zähringen. The three bishops of the dioceses in question, however, wanted to maintain autonomy from all parties concerned.

In 1162, Amadeus permitted the use of the land of Vaud, and the forests that belonged to him, by the Abbot of Haut-Crêt.

In 1178 Amadeus donated the vineyards and tithes collected in Bossey to the canons of the chapter of St. Pierre Cathedral in Geneva.

== Family ==
Amadeus was the son of Aymon I of Geneva (f. 1128) and Ida of Faucigny, daughter of Louis I, Lord of Faucigny. For two years Amadeus was married to Matilde of Cuiseaux, daughter of Hugo I of Cuiseaux, with whom he had:

1. William I of Geneva (1132–1196) was married to Marguerite Beatrice of Faucigny with whom he had three children.

In a second marriage (1137), with Beatrice de Domène, daughter of Pierre Ainar of Domène, he had:

1. Amedée, Lord of Gex.
2. Beatrice of Geneva, married to Ebald IV de Grandson, parents of the future Bishop of Geneva, Aymon de Grandson
3. Margaret of Geneva (fl. 1160), countess of Geneva, and married to Henry I of Faucigny (1155–1197), baron of Faucigny.

== See also ==
- County of Geneva
- List of counts of Geneva

Preceded by Aymon I of Geneva	Count of Geneva; 1128–1178	Succeeded by William I of Geneva
