= Eleanor of Provence =

Queen of England from 1236 to 1272

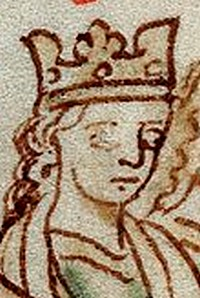
- Detail of Eleanor from the Chronica Majora by Matthew Paris

Queen consort of England
- Tenure: 14 January 1236 – 16 November 1272
- Coronation: 20 January 1236
- Born: c. 1223; Aix-en-Provence, County of Provence
- Died: 24/25 June 1291 (aged 67–68); Amesbury, Wiltshire, England
- Burial: Amesbury Priory
- Spouse: Henry III of England (m. 1236; died 1272)
- Issue: Edward I, King of England; Margaret, Queen of Scots; Beatrice, Duchess of Brittany; Edmund, Earl of Lancaster; Katherine of England
- House: Barcelona
- Father: Ramon Berenguer V, Count of Provence
- Mother: Beatrice of Savoy

Eleanor of Provence (c. 1223 – 24/25 June 1291) was a Provençal noblewoman who became Queen of England as the wife of King Henry III from 1236 until his death in 1272. She served as regent of England during the absence of her husband in France in 1253.

Although Eleanor was completely devoted to her husband and staunchly defended him against the rebel Simon de Montfort, 6th Earl of Leicester, she was very unpopular among the Londoners. This was because she had brought many relatives with her to England in her retinue; these were known as "the Savoyards" (her mother was from Savoy), and, as Londoners saw it, these foreigners were given influential positions in the government and realm to lord over them. On one occasion, Eleanor's barge was attacked by angry Londoners who pelted her with stones, mud, pieces of paving, rotten eggs and vegetables.

Eleanor had five children, including the future King Edward I of England. She was also renowned for her cleverness, skill at writing poetry, and as a leader of fashion.

== Early life and family ==
Born in the city of Aix-en-Provence in southern France, she was the second daughter of Ramon Berenguer V, Count of Provence (1198–1245) and Beatrice of Savoy (1198–1267), the second of four daughters of Thomas I of Savoy and his wife Margaret of Geneva. Two sons were born before the daughters, but they died very young. Eleanor was probably born latest in 1223; Matthew Paris describes her as being "jamque duodennem" (already twelve) when she arrived in the Kingdom of England for her marriage.

She was well educated as a child and developed a strong love of reading, partly due to the influence of her tutor Romée de Villeneuve. Her three sisters also married kings. Like her mother, grandmother, and sisters, Eleanor was renowned for her beauty. She was a dark-haired brunette with fine eyes. Piers Langtoft speaks of her as "The erle's daughter, the fairest may of life".

Her elder sister Margaret married Louis, King of France, and of her younger sisters Sanchia was to marry Richard of Cornwall, Henry's brother who was to become King of the Romans, and Beatrice was to marry Louis' brother Charles of Anjou, the King of Sicily. She was especially close to Margaret, to whom she was close in age, and with whom she sustained friendly relationships until they grew old.

== Marriage negotiations ==
Henry investigated a range of potential marriage partners in his youth, but they all proved unsuitable for reasons of European and domestic politics. (Note: An early option was one of the daughters of Leopold VI, Duke of Austria. In the early 1220s, Henry considered marrying Marjorie, the sister of Alexander II of Scotland, but this was dropped to leave open the possibility of Henry marrying Duke Peter I of Brittany's daughter, Yolande. Another option that came close to fruition was Joan, the daughter of Simon, Count of Ponthieu, but Blanche, the mother of Louis IX of France, intervened and prevailed upon the Pope to prevent the marriage.)

After her elder sister Margaret married Louis IX of France, their uncle William corresponded with Henry III of England to persuade him to marry Eleanor. Henry sought a dowry of up to twenty thousand silver marks to help offset the dowry he had just paid for his sister Isabella, but Eleanor's father was able to negotiate this down to no dowry, just a promise to leave her ten thousand marks when he died.

On 22 June 1235, the marriage contract was confirmed; Eleanor was betrothed to King Henry III (1207–1272).

== Queen consort ==
=== Wedding and coronation ===
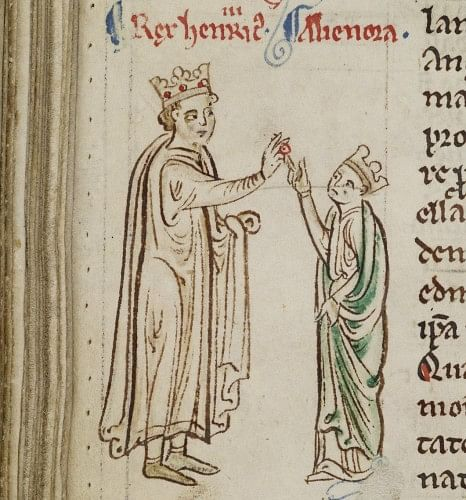
The wedding of Eleanor and Henry III depicted by Matthew Paris in the 1250s, showing their age gap; he was 28, she was 12 or 13.

Eleanor was married to King Henry III of England on 14 January 1236. At the time, she was either 12 or 13 years old, while he was 28. She had never seen Henry prior to the wedding at Canterbury Cathedral and had never set foot in his kingdom. Edmund Rich, Archbishop of Canterbury, officiated. She was dressed in a shimmering golden dress that fitted tightly at the waist and flared out to wide pleats at her feet. The sleeves were long and lined with ermine. After riding to London the same day where a procession of citizens greeted the bridal pair, Eleanor was crowned queen consort of England in a ceremony at Westminster Abbey planned by Henry which was followed by a magnificent banquet with the entire nobility in full attendance. Her love for her husband grew significantly from 1236 onward.

Through her marriage with Henry she acquired at her coronation the titles of Queen of England, Lady of Ireland and Duchess of Aquitaine. She also acquired the titles of Duchess of Normandy and Countess of Anjou although these already symbolic claims were dropped as part of the 1259 Treaty of Paris.

Despite the substantial age gap, the historian Margaret Howell observes that the King "was generous and warm-hearted and prepared to lavish care and affection on his wife". Henry gave Eleanor extensive gifts and paid personal attention to establishing and equipping her household. He also brought her fully into his religious life, including involving her in his devotion to Edward the Confessor.

=== Responsibilities ===
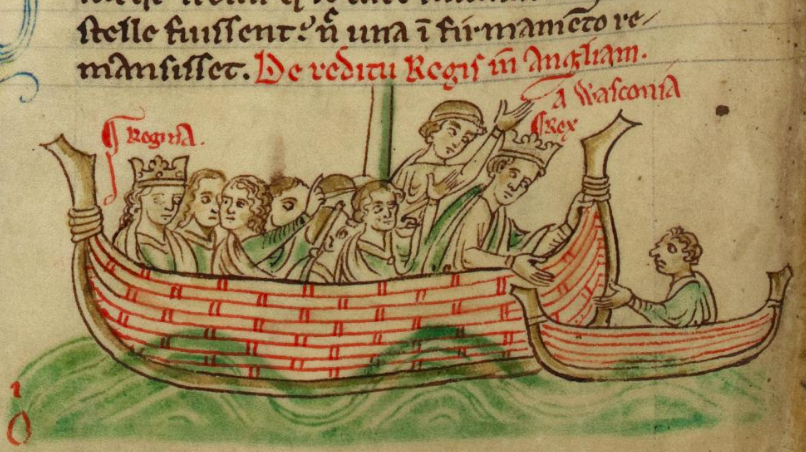
Eleanor ('Regina') and Henry III ('Rex') returning from Gascony, by Matthew Paris

Though Eleanor and Henry supported different factions at times, she was a loyal and faithful consort and was made regent of England when her husband went to suppress a rebellion in Gascony in 1253. (During this time she exercised the functions of Lord Chancellor, the only woman to do so until Liz Truss was appointed to the office in 2016.)

Eleanor was devoted to her husband's cause. Although originally supportive of Simon de Montfort when he was an ally of Henry, she was a strong opponent when de Montfort led the English Barons against Henry, raising mercenary troops in France for her husband. Her influence with her sister Margaret, Louis IX's wife, meant that Henry had some support from France.

The primary reason Eleanor was chosen as queen was the chance she provided to create a valuable set of alliances with the rulers of the south and south-east of France. This led Eleanor to bring in her retinue a large number of Savoyards, many of whom become prominent thanks to Henry's patronage. This caused friction with the English barons. Her uncle Peter was particularly influential as her early advisor before he inherited the County of Savoy.

The Savoyards would later be opposed to the Lusignan faction of Henry's Poitevin half brothers. Many Savoyards, probably including Eleanor, backed a 1258 coup d'état by a coalition of English barons who expelled the Poitevins from England, reforming the royal government through a process called the Provisions of Oxford.

=== Religious life ===
During her early years as queen, her religious formation was under the guidance of the royal physician and confessor Nicholas Farnham, later Bishop of Durham. She was also friendly with the Franciscan Adam Marsh and the reforming bishops Richard of Chichester and Robert Grosseteste, Bishop of London. Eleanor shared her husband's devotion to faith.

=== Attack by Londoners ===
Eleanor stoutly hated the Londoners, who returned her hatred. In revenge for their dislike, Eleanor had demanded from the city all the back payments due on the monetary tribute known as queen-gold, by which she received a tenth of all fines which came to the Crown. In addition to the queen-gold, other such fines were levied on the citizens by the Queen on the thinnest of pretexts.

During the Second Barons War in 1263, London had risen in revolt. Henry and Eleanor were trapped in the Tower of London. On 13 July 1263, she attempted to escape by sailing down the Thames to Edward's army when her barge was attacked by citizens of London. In fear for her life as she was pelted with stones, loose pieces of paving, dried mud, rotten eggs and vegetables, Eleanor was rescued by Thomas Fitzthomas, the Mayor of London, and took refuge at the bishop of London's home. This meant that she and her husband were in effect prisoners of De Montfort.

== Queen dowager and death ==
=== Early widowhood ===
In 1272, Henry died, and her son Edward, who was 33 years old, became king of England. She remained in England as queen dowager and raised several of her grandchildren: two of Edward's children, Henry and Eleanor, as well as her daughter Beatrice's son John of Brittany.

In 1273, after an earlier dispute over its control, Queen Eleanor granted a new charter and additional endowment to the hospital of St Katharine by the Tower in memory of Henry, reserving the foundation's patronage to the queens of England.

When her grandson Henry died in her care in 1274, Eleanor went into mourning and gave orders for his heart to be buried at the Dominican priory at Guildford, which she founded in his memory. Eleanor's two remaining daughters died in 1275, Margaret on 26 February and Beatrice on 24 March.

=== Expulsion of the Jews from Dower lands ===
Eleanor was noted for her hostility to Jews and Judaism. On 16 January 1275, she received permission from Edward I to expel the Jews from all of her lands. Jews were expelled from Marlborough, Gloucester, Worcester and Cambridge. The Jews of Cambridge were instructed to flee to Norwich, and those of Marlborough to Devizes. The Jews of Gloucester were ordered to move to Bristol, but were worried because of anti-Jewish violence that had occurred there, and instead mostly chose to move to Hereford along with those forced to leave nearby Worcester.

=== Amesbury Priory ===
She became a nun and retired in 1286 to Amesbury Priory in Wiltshire, eight miles north of Salisbury, as Henry II's widow, Eleanor of Aquitaine, had taken up residence at the mother abbey, Fontevraud. She was visited there by her son, King Edward. Two of her granddaughters – Mary of Woodstock (daughter of Edward) and Eleanor of Brittany – were already nuns there, each having entered the priory on reaching the age of seven.

Eleanor died on 24/25 June 1291 at the priory and was buried there. The site of her grave is unknown, making her the only English queen without a marked grave. Her heart was taken to London where it was buried at the Franciscan priory of Greyfriars.

== Cultural legacy ==
Eleanor was renowned for her learning, cleverness, and skill at writing poetry, as well as her beauty and antisemitism; she was also known as a leader of fashion, continually importing clothes from France. She favoured red silk damask and often wore parti-coloured cottes (a type of tunic), gold or silver girdles into which a dagger was casually thrust, and decorations of gilt quatrefoil. To cover her dark hair, she wore jaunty pillbox caps. Eleanor introduced a new type of wimple to England, which was high, "into which the head receded until the face seemed like a flower in an enveloping spathe".

She had developed a love for the songs of the troubadours as a child and continued this interest into adulthood. She bought many romantic and historical books that included stories from ancient times to contemporary romances written in the period (13th century). (Note: Prestwich states she owned romances written in French.)

Eleanor is the protagonist of The Queen From Provence, a historical romance by British novelist Jean Plaidy which was published in 1979. Eleanor is a main character in the novel Four Sisters, All Queens by author Sherry Jones, as well as the novels The Sister Queens by Sophie Perinot, Falls The Shadow by Sharon Kay Penman, and "My Fair Lady: A Story of Henry III's Lost Queen" by J. P. Reedman. She is also the subject of Norwegian Symphonic metal band Leave's Eyes in their song "Eleonore De Provence" from their album Symphonies of the Night.

== Issue ==
Despite initial concerns that the Queen might be barren, Eleanor and Henry had five children together. Eleanor seems to have been especially devoted to her eldest son, Edward; when he was deathly ill in 1246, she stayed with him at the abbey at Beaulieu in Hampshire for three weeks, long past the time allowed by monastic rules. She personally supervised Edward's upbringing and education. It was because of her influence that King Henry granted the duchy of Gascony to Edward in 1249. Her youngest child, Katherine, seems to have had a degenerative disease that rendered her deaf. When the little girl died at the age of three, both her royal parents suffered overwhelming grief. Eleanor possibly had four other sons who also died in childhood, but their existence is in doubt as there is no contemporary record of them. (Note: Until the late 20th century, historians also accepted the existence of four other children, Richard (d. 29 August 1250), John (b. 1250 – d. 31 August 1252), William (d. c. 1256) and Henry (b. May 1260 – d. 10 October 1260). Subsequent historical analysis has shown that it is improbable that these children existed, and historians such as Huw Ridgeway and Margaret Howell conclude that Henry and Eleanor had only five children. These five—Edward, Margaret, Beatrice, Edmund and Katherine—are well documented in multiple chronicler and financial accounts from Henry's reign. The only record for Richard, John, William and Henry is in the Flores Historiarum manuscript, but the details appear to have been added to the original 13th document in the next century, albeit possibly in good faith. It is impossible to completely rule out the possibility that the children existed but that the other evidence of their existence was suppressed, perhaps because they were handicapped, or they were miscarriages or still births.)

1. Edward I (1239–1307), married Eleanor of Castile (1241–1290) in 1254, by whom he had issue, including his heir Edward II. His second wife was Margaret of France, by whom he had issue.
2. Margaret (1240–1275), married King Alexander III of Scotland, by whom she had issue.
3. Beatrice (1242–1275), married John II, Duke of Brittany, by whom she had issue.
4. Edmund Crouchback, 1st Earl of Lancaster (1245–1296), married Aveline de Forz in 1269, who died four years later without issue; married Blanche of Artois in 1276, by whom he had issue.
5. Katherine (25 November 1253 – 3 May 1257)

The children spent most of their childhood at Windsor Castle and Henry appears to have been extremely attached to them, rarely spending extended periods of time apart from his family.

== Historiography ==
Some historians have regarded her as the most unpopular queen in England. Historians Margaret Howell and David Carpenter describe her as being "more combative" and "far tougher and more determined" than her husband.

== Notes ==
Eleanor of Provence House of Barcelona Cadet branch of the Bellonids Born: c. 1223 Died: 24/25 June 1291
English royalty
Vacant Title last held by Isabella of Angoulême	Queen consort of England; 14 January 1236 – 16 November 1272	Vacant Title next held by Eleanor of Castile
Political offices
Preceded by Sir John Lexington	Keeper of the Great Seal; 1253 – 1254	Succeeded by William of Kilkenny
