= Ramon Berenguer V of Provence =

Count of Provence and Forcalquier

Ramon Berenguer IV or V
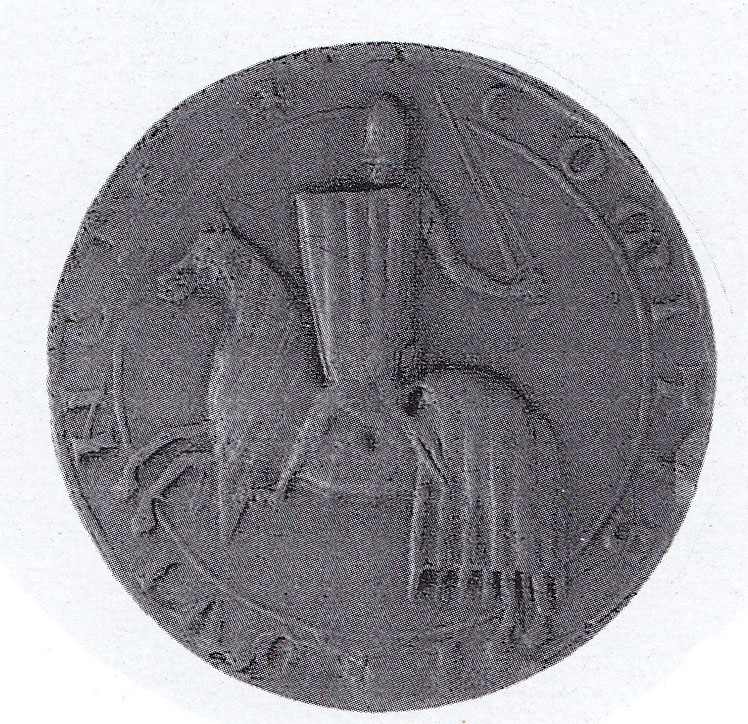
- Ramon Berenguer V as depicted on his seal

Count of Provence
- Reign: 1209–1245
- Predecessor: Alfonso II
- Successor: Beatrice

Count of Forcalquier
- Reign: 1217 or 1220–1245
- Predecessor: Garsenda
- Successor: Beatrice
- Born: 1198
- Died: 19 August 1245 (aged 47); Aix-en-Provence
- Burial: Église Saint-Jean-de-Malte
- Spouse: Beatrice of Savoy
- Issue: Margaret, Queen of France; Eleanor, Queen of England; Sanchia, Queen of Germany; Beatrice, Queen of Sicily
- House: Barcelona
- Father: Alfonso II, Count of Provence
- Mother: Garsenda, Countess of Forcalquier

Ramon Berenguer IV or V (French: Raimond-Bérenger; 1198 – 19 August 1245) was a member of the House of Barcelona who ruled as count of Provence and Forcalquier. He was the first count of Provence to live in the county in more than one hundred years. During the minority of a previous count in 1144–1161, the regency was exercised by Ramon Berenguer IV of Barcelona, who is sometimes counted among the counts of Provence, which has led to varied numbering of the counts of Provence named Ramon Berenguer. This Ramon Berenguer was the fourth of his name to be a reigning count of Provence.

All four of his daughters eventually became queen consorts of separate kingdoms by marrying into the Capetian and Plantagenet dynasties.

== Family ==
Ramon Berenguer was the son of Alfonso II, Count of Provence, and Garsenda, Countess of Forcalquier. After his father's death (1209), Ramon's mother sent him to the Templar castle of Monzón in Aragon. He was accompanied by his cousin James, whose life was also under threat. He left Monzon in 1216 to claim his inheritance, which included the county of Forcalquier—inherited from his mother.

On 5 June 1219, Ramon Berenguer married Beatrice of Savoy, daughter of Thomas, Count of Savoy. She was a shrewd and politically astute woman, whose beauty was likened by Matthew Paris to that of a second Niobe. The wedding also provided the 21-year-old Ramon with a powerful father-in-law to aid him in establishing his authority and protecting his interests. They had:

- stillborn son (1220)
- stillborn son (1220)
- Margaret of Provence (1221–1295), wife of Louis IX, King of France
- Eleanor of Provence (1223–1291), wife of Henry III, King of England
- Sanchia of Provence (1225–1261), wife of Richard, King of the Romans, brother of the King of England
- Beatrice of Provence (1229–1267), wife of Charles I, King of Sicily, brother of the King of France

== Rule ==
Ramon Berenguer and his wife were known for their support of troubadors, always having some around the court. He was known for his generosity, though his income did not always keep up. He wrote laws prohibiting nobles from performing menial work, such as farming or heavy labour.

Ramon Berenguer had many border disputes with his neighbours, the counts of Toulouse. In 1226, Ramon began to reassert his right to rule in Marseille. The citizens there initially sought the help of Ramon's father-in-law Thomas, Count of Savoy in his role as imperial vicar. However, they later sought the help of Raymond VII, Count of Toulouse.

In 1228, Ramon Berenguer supported his father-in-law in a double-sided conflict against Turin and Guigues VI of Viennois. This small war was one of many rounds intended to more firmly establish control over trade from Italy into France, and Provence included several key routes.

While the Albigensian Crusade worked in his favour against Toulouse, Ramon Berenguer was concerned that its resolution in the Treaty of Paris left him in a precarious position. Raymond turned his troops from fighting France to attempting to claim lands from Provence. When Blanche of Castile sent her knight to both Toulouse and Provence in 1233, Ramon Berenguer entertained him lavishly, and the knight left well impressed by both the count and his eldest daughter, Margaret. Soon after, Blanche negotiated the marriage between Margaret and her son, Louis, with a dowry of ten thousand silver marks. Ramon Berenguer had to get contributions from allies for a portion, and had to pledge several of his castles to cover the rest. Ramon Berenguer and Beatrice travelled with their daughter to Lyon in 1234 to sign the marriage treaty, and then Margaret was escorted to her wedding in Sens by her uncles William and Thomas of Savoy.

Shortly after, William began negotiating on Ramon Berenguer's behalf with Henry III of England to marry his daughter Eleanor. Henry sent his own knight to Provence early in 1235, and again Ramon Berenguer and his family entertained him lavishly. Henry wrote to William on 22 June that he was very interested, and sent a delegation to negotiate the marriage in October. Henry was seeking a dowry of up to twenty thousand silver marks to help offset the dowry he had just paid for his sister, Isabella. However, he had drafted seven different versions of the marriage contract, with different amounts for the dowry, the lowest being zero. Ramon Berenguer shrewdly negotiated for that option, offering as consolation a promise to leave her ten thousand marks in his last will.

In 1238, Ramon Berenguer joined his brother-in-law Amadeus IV at the court of Emperor Frederick II in Turin. Frederick was gathering forces to assert more control in Italy. Raymond VII of Toulouse was also summoned, and all were expected to work together in the war.

In January 1244, Pope Innocent IV decreed that no one but the pope could excommunicate Ramon Berenguer. In 1245, Ramon Berenguer sent representatives to the First Council of Lyon, to discuss crusades and the excommunication of Frederick.

Ramon Berenguer died in August 1245 in Aix-en-Provence, leaving the county to his youngest daughter, Beatrice.

== Death and legacy ==
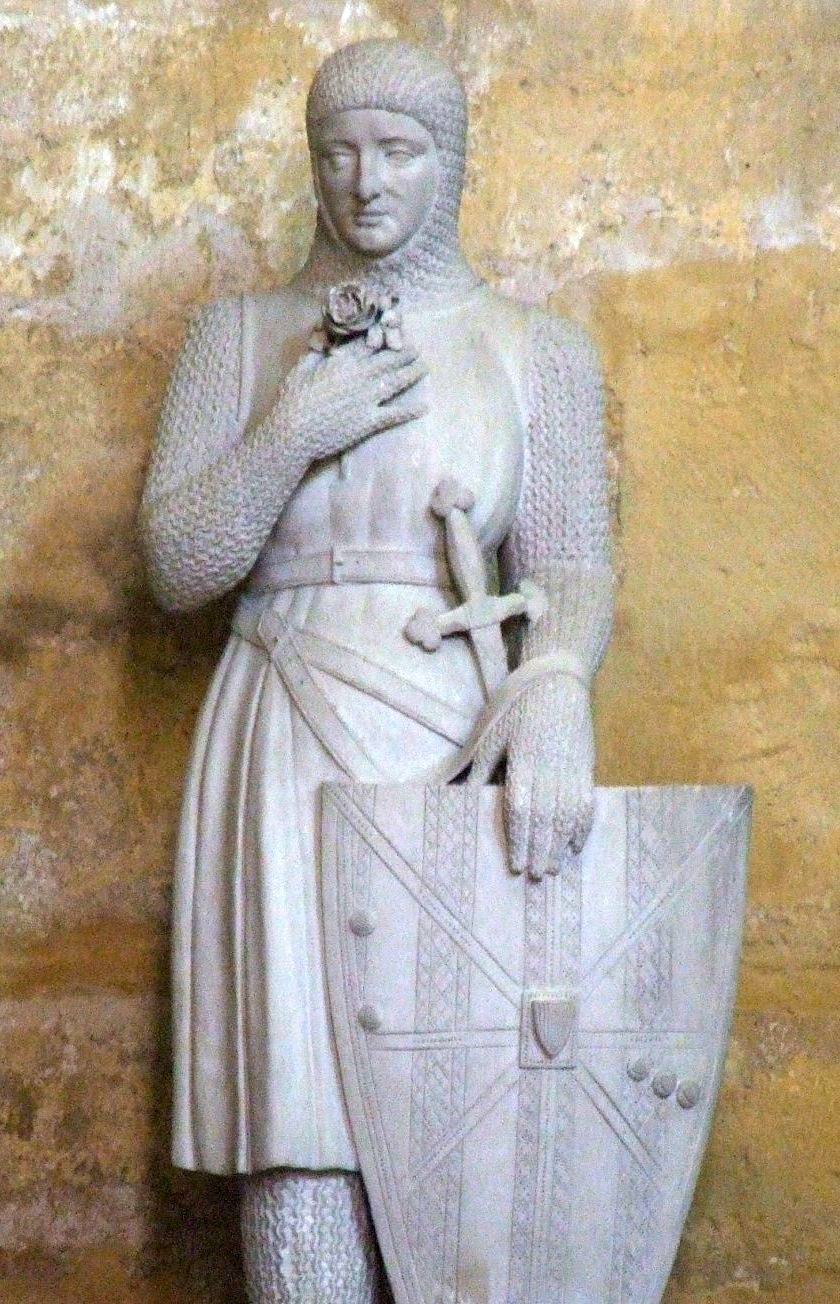
Ramon Berenguer's statue in the Église Saint-Jean-de-Malte in Aix-en-Provence

Ramon Berenguer V died in Aix-en-Provence. At least two planhs (Occitan funeral laments) of uncertain authorship (one possibly by Aimeric de Peguilhan and one falsely attributed to Rigaut de Berbezilh) were written in his honour.

Giovanni Villani in his Nuova Cronica said:

Count Raymond was a lord of gentle lineage, and kin to them of the house of Aragon, and to the family of the count of Toulouse, By inheritance Provence, this side of the Rhone, was his; a wise and courteous lord was he, and of noble state and virtuous, and in his time did honourable deeds, and to his court came all gentle persons of Provence and of France and of Catalonia, by reason of his courtesy and noble estate, and he made many Provençal coblas and canzoni of great worth.

== Sources ==
- Aurell, Martin (1995). Les noces du comte: mariage et pouvoir en Catalogne (785-1213) (in French). Publications de la Sorbonne.
- Cardona, Marti Aurel I. (2016). "Raymond Berenguer V, Count of Provence". In Gerli, E. Michael (ed.). Medieval Iberia: An Encyclopedia. Routledge. pp. 693–694.
- Cox, Eugene L. (1974). The Eagles of Savoy. Princeton: Princeton University Press. ISBN 0691052166.
- Cox, Eugene (1999). "The kingdoms of Burgundy, the lands of the house of Savoy and adjacent territories". In Abulafia, David (ed.). The New Cambridge Medieval History. Vol. 5, C.1198 – c.1300. Cambridge University Press. pp. 358–374.
- Davin, Emmanuel (1963). "Béatrice de Savoie, Comtesse de Provence, mère de quatre reines (1198–1267)". Bulletin de l'Association Guillaume Budé (in French). 2 juin.
- Howell, Margaret (2001). Eleanor of Provence: Queenship in Thirteenth-Century England. Blackwell Publishers.

Ramon Berenguer V of Provence House of Barcelona Cadet branch of the Bellonids Born: 1198 Died: 19 August 1245
Regnal titles
Preceded by Alfonso II	Count of Provence; 1 December 1209 – 19 August 1245	Succeeded by Beatrice
Preceded by Garsenda	Count of Forcalquier; 1217 or 1220 – 19 August 1245	Succeeded by Beatrice
