= Sanchia of Provence =

Queen of the Romans (1225–1261)

- Countess of Cornwall
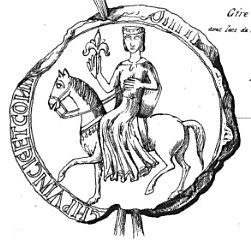
- Seal of Queen Sanchia

Queen of the Romans
- Tenure: 13 January 1257 – 9 November 1261
- Coronation: 27 May 1257
- Born: c. 1225
- Died: 9 November 1261 (aged c. 36); Berkhamsted Castle, Hertfordshire
- Burial: Hailes Abbey, Gloucestershire
- Spouse: Richard, King of the Romans (m. 1243)
- Issue: Richard of Cornwall; Edmund, 2nd Earl of Cornwall
- House: Barcelona
- Father: Ramon Berenguer IV, Count of Provence
- Mother: Beatrice of Savoy

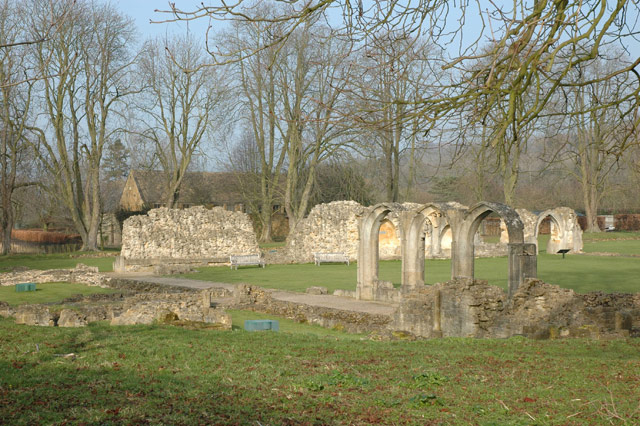
Hailes Abbey

Sanchia of Provence (c. 1225 – 9 November 1261) was Queen of the Romans from 1257 until her death in 1261 as the wife of King Richard.

Sanchia was the third daughter of Ramon Berenguer IV, Count of Provence, and Beatrice of Savoy. She was described as an "incomparable beauty". In 1243 she married Richard, then still an English prince and Earl of Cornwall. After her husband was elected king of the Romans, Sanchia was crowned alongside him at Aachen Cathedral in 1257. Four years later, Queen Sanchia died aged around 36.

== Life ==
Sanchia's sisters Margaret, Eleanor and Beatrice were the respective wives of Louis IX of France, Henry III of England and Charles I of Sicily. Sanchia was said to have a softer and more winsome type of good looks than either of her older sisters, Margaret and Eleanor.

=== Countess of Cornwall ===
It was Eleanor of Provence who arranged a marriage between her sister Sanchia and her brother-in-law Richard, 1st Earl of Cornwall, whose first wife Isabel Marshal had died recently. Richard, although not a sovereign, rather a royal prince, was the wealthiest man in the Kingdom of England and perhaps in Europe. Sanchia was engaged to Raymond VII of Toulouse, but the weak part he played in recent fighting with the king of France was a good enough excuse for breaking the bond. Eleanor and Sanchia's uncle Peter was sent to negotiate the marriage contract in 1242. Another uncle, Philip, escorted Sanchia safely to the English court in Gascony. There, they joined Sanchia's sister Eleanor and her husband Henry III of England and met their new daughter Beatrice. The wedding took place at Westminster on 23 November. An idea of the extravagance of the festivities may be gleaned from the fact that thirty thousand dishes were prepared for the wedding dinner alone.

Beatrice of Savoy, mother of the bride, came to England to see her third daughter wedded, but her father Ramon Berenguer IV was detained by state difficulties which his wife solved by getting a loan from Henry III of four thousand marks. The cost of the wedding was chiefly defrayed by a levy imposed on the Jews of the country. It was an arbitrary proceeding, each of them receiving notice of the size of the donation required.

The marriages of the kings of France and England and two of their brothers to the four sisters from Provence improved the relationship between the two countries that led to the conclusion of the Treaty of Paris in 1259. Sanchia was present for the signing of the treaty, along with all of her sisters and her mother.

=== Queen of the Romans ===
Richard was elected in 1256 as King of Germany by a majority of the seven electoral princes, with the title of King of the Romans, a preparatory step in being named Holy Roman Emperor by the pope. In January 1257, the ambassadors bringing the news of Richard's election were received in a long hall where Richard and Sanchia were dining in considerable elegance and state.

"Richard rose to hear what the men from Bohemia had to say and at the finish he burst into tears. He would accept the crown, he said, but it was not through greed or ambition. His sole object was to assist in restoring prosperity to the German states; his honest desire was to rule justly and well. It was clear to the German delegation, and to the throng of adherents and servants who swarmed into the hall to listen, that he was happy over the fulfillment of his great wish. It must have been quite apparent also that Sanchia was delighted beyond measure. Now she would be a queen as well as her two older and patronizing sisters."

Sanchia was crowned Queen of the Romans with her husband on 27 May 1257 at Aachen Cathedral in Germany. She and her husband then spent fifteen months traveling in the area near Mainz. They hurriedly traveled back to England when the political situation deteriorated there. Sanchia grew ill in the autumn of 1260 and died a year later, with her son Edmund present.

== Issue ==
Sanchia had two sons with Richard of Cornwall:

- Richard of Cornwall (July 1246 – 15 August 1246).
- Edmund, 2nd Earl of Cornwall (1249–1300), married Margaret de Clare (died 1312), no issue.

Richard also had a son, named Richard, by his mistress Joan de Valletort who is sometimes mistakenly called the son of Sanchia.

Sanchia died 9 November 1261 at Berkhamsted Castle and was buried 15 November in Hailes Abbey.

== Sources ==
- Cox, Eugene L. (1974). The Eagles of Savoy. Princeton: Princeton University Press. ISBN 0691052166.
- Sanders, I.J. (1951). "The Texts of the Peace of Paris, 1259". The English Historical Review. 66 (258). Oxford University Press: 81–97. doi:10.1093/ehr/lxvi.cclviii.81.
