= Beatrice of Savoy =

Countess consort of Provence (c.1198–c.1267)

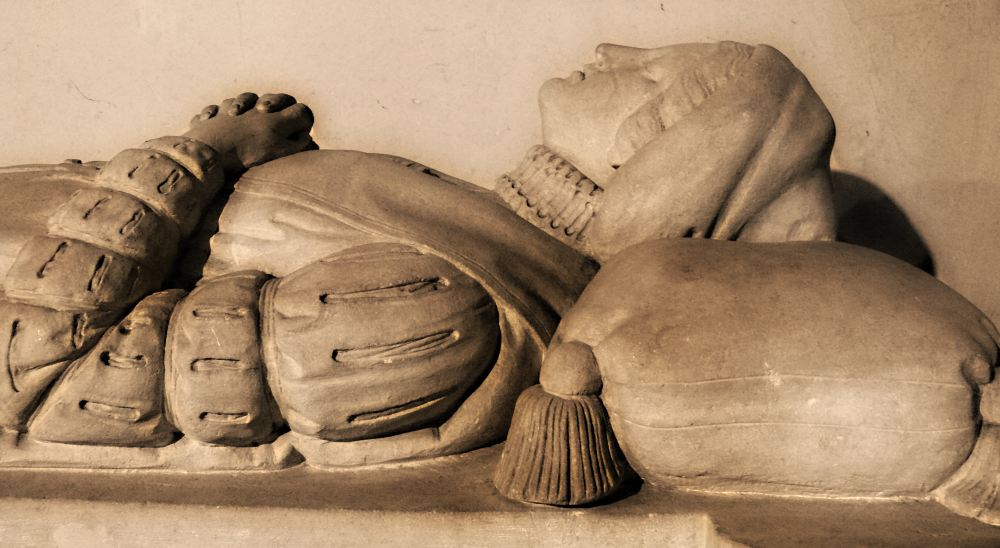

Countess consort of Provence
- Tenure: December 1220 – 19 August 1245
- Born: 1198; Château du Menuet
- Died: 1267 (aged 68–69); Château du Menuet
- Spouse: Ramon Berenguer V, Count of Provence
- Issue: Margaret, Queen of France; Eleanor, Queen of England; Sanchia, Queen of Germany; Beatrice, Queen of Sicily
- House: Savoy
- Father: Thomas I of Savoy
- Mother: Margaret of Geneva

Beatrice of Savoy (c. 1198 – c. 1267) was Countess consort of Provence by her marriage to Ramon Berenguer V, Count of Provence. She served as regent of her birth country Savoy during the absence of her brother in 1264.

William I de Genève descendants

== Countess of Provence ==
Beatrice was the daughter of Thomas I of Savoy and Margaret of Geneva. She married Ramon Berenguer V, Count of Provence in December 1220. She was a shrewd and politically astute woman, whose beauty was likened to that of a second Niobe by Matthew Paris. Ramon and Beatrice of Savoy had four daughters, who all lived to adulthood, and married kings. Their only son, Raymond died in early infancy.

In 1242, Beatrice's brother Peter was sent to Provence by Henry III to negotiate the marriage of Sanchia to Richard of Cornwall, brother to Henry III. Another brother, Philip, escorted Beatrice and Sanchia to the English court in Gascony, arriving in May 1243. There they joined Henry, Eleanor, and their infant daughter, Beatrice of England. Henry was very happy at this occasion and gave many gifts to the various relatives.

In November 1243, Beatrice and Sanchia travelled to England for the wedding. This wedding did much to strengthen the bond between Richard and Henry III. Richard had threatened potential rebellion a couple of time during Henry III's rule, and on this occasion he was particularly unhappy with the Savoyard influence in the English Court, particularly Peter of Savoy, feeling that he was being pushed to the side. The marriage to Sanchia, sister of the Queen, appeased a lot of the concerns that he had, and soothed the discontent between himself and Henry. She further strengthened the unity of the English royal family by convincing Henry III to help pay the debts of his sister Eleanor and her husband Simon de Montfort, who had often been at odds with Henry. In January 1244, Beatrice negotiated a loan for her husband from Henry of four thousand marks, offering the king five Provençal castles as collateral.

== Dowager countess ==
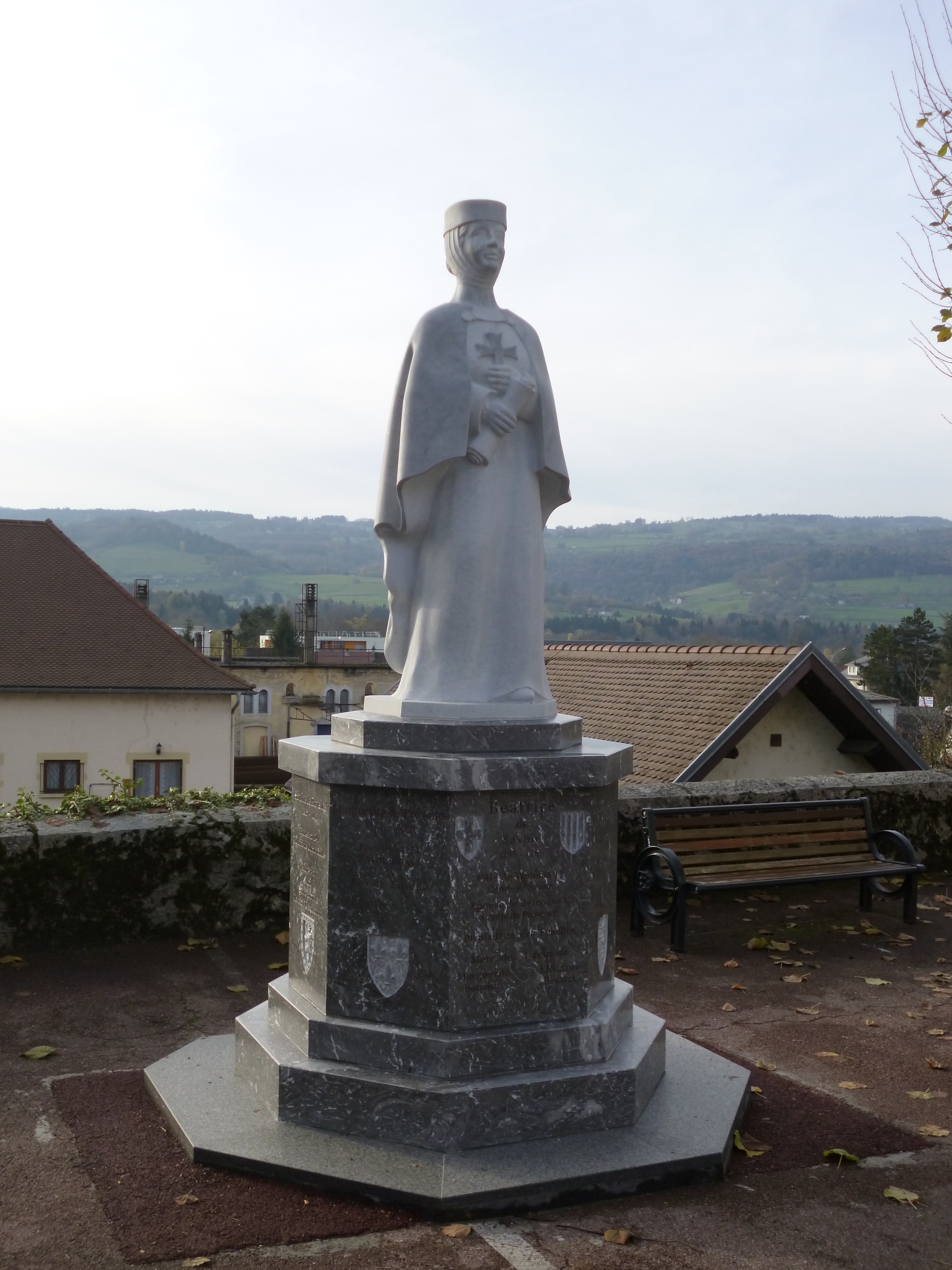
Statue of Beatrice of Savoy in Les Échelles (Savoy, France)

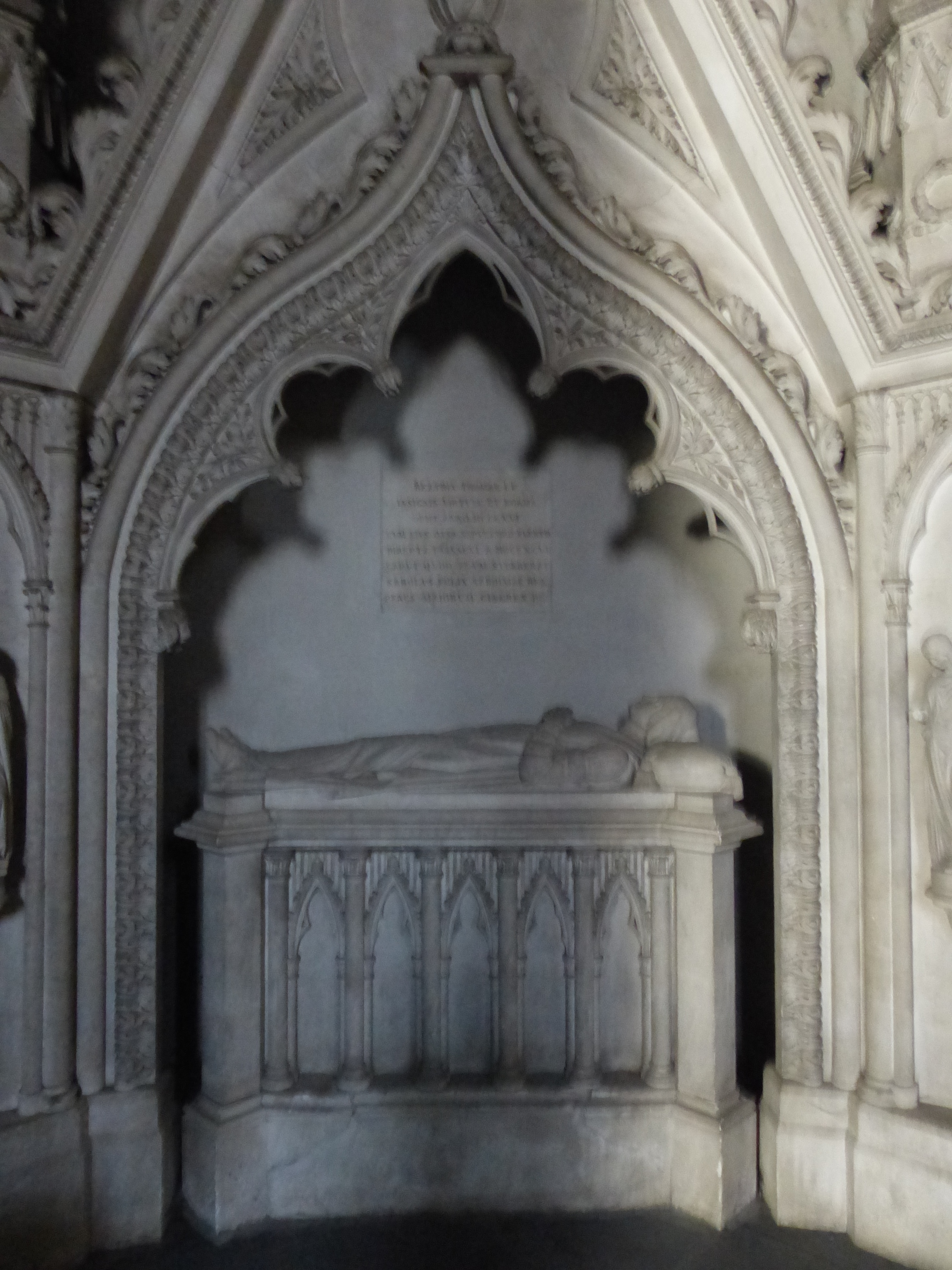
Grave of Beatrice of Savoy in Hautecombe Abbey

When Ramon Berenguer died on 19 August 1245, he left Provence to his youngest daughter, and his widow was granted the usufruct of the county of Provence for her lifetime. Beatrice's daughter and namesake then became one of the most attractive heiresses in medieval Europe. Frederick II, Holy Roman Emperor sent a fleet and James I of Aragon sent an army to seize her, so Beatrice placed herself and her daughter in a safe fortress in Aix, secured the trust of its people then sent to the Pope for his protection. The Pope was also a target for Frederick's military incursions in France. In Cluny during December 1245, a secret discussion, between Pope Innocent IV, Louis IX of France, his mother Blanche of Castile, and his brother Charles of Anjou, took place. It was decided that in return for Louis IX supporting the Pope militarily, the Pope would allow Charles of Anjou, youngest brother to the French King, to marry Beatrice of Provence. Mother and daughter were satisfied with this selection. But Provence was to never go to France outright through Charles. It was agreed that if Charles and Beatrice had children, the county would go to them; if there was no issue, then the county would go to Sanchia of Provence. If Sanchia died without an heir, Provence would go to the King of Aragon.

Henry protested the selection, arguing that he had not yet received the full dowry for Eleanor nor his brother for Sanchia. He also still had the castles in Provence against the loan he had made to the former count.

When Charles took over the administration of Provence in 1246, he did not respect Beatrice's rights within the county. She sought the aid of Barral of Baux and the Pope in protecting her rights within the area. The citizens of Marseille, Avignon, and Arles joined this resistance to Capetian control. In 1248, Charles began to seek peace with her so that he could join his brother's crusade. A temporary truce was reached to allow this.

In 1248, she travelled back to England with her brother Thomas, to see their family there.

In 1254, as Louis was returning from his crusade by way of Provence, Beatrice petitioned him for a more permanent resolution of the dispute with Charles. The French queen Margaret joined the petition, noting that Charles had not respected her dowry either. Beatrice travelled with them back to Paris. As the year progressed, Henry and his wife were invited to travel to Paris, and eventually all four daughters joined their mother there for Christmas.

The generally good relationship among the four sisters did much to improve the relationship of the French and English kings. It brought about the Treaty of Paris in 1259, where differences were resolved. Beatrice and all her four daughters participated in the talks. While the family was still gathered, Louis IX finally persuaded Beatrice to surrender her claims and control in Provence in exchange for a sizeable pension to be paid to her. Charles also paid back the loan henry had made to the previous count, clearing his claims in the county.

In 1262, Beatrice was part of the family discussion to try again to bring peace between Henry and Simon de Montfort. When Henry was captured in 1264, Beatrice's brother Peter II, Count of Savoy took his army to join the efforts to free the king. He left Beatrice in charge of Savoy while he was gone.

Beatrice outlived her third daughter Sanchia and came close to outliving her youngest daughter Beatrice, who died months after her mother (Beatrice the elder died in January, Beatrice the younger died in September). Beatrice of Savoy died on 1265 or 1266–1267.

== Issue ==
1. stillborn son (1220)
2. stillborn son (1220)
3. Margaret, Queen of France (1221–1295), wife of Louis IX of France
4. Eleanor, Queen of England (1223–1291), wife of Henry III of England
5. Sanchia, Queen of Germany (1225–1261), wife of Richard, Earl of Cornwall
6. Beatrice, Queen of Sicily (1229–1267), wife of Charles I of Sicily

== Sources ==
- Cox, Eugene L (1974). The Eagles of Savoy. Princeton, NJ.: Princeton University Press. ISBN 0691052166.
- Hilton, Lisa (2008). Queens Consort, England's Medieval Queens. Great Britain: Weidenfeld & Nichelson. pp. 206–207. ISBN 978-0-7538-2611-9.
- Pollock, M.A. (2015). Scotland, England and France after the Loss of Normandy, 1204-1296: 'Auld Amitie'. The Boydell Press.
- Sanders, I.J. (1951). "The Texts of the Peace of Paris, 1259". The English Historical Review. 66 (258). Oxford University Press: 81–97. doi:10.1093/ehr/lxvi.cclviii.81.
- Howell, Margaret (2001). Eleanor of Provence: Queenship in Thirteenth-Century England. Blackwell Publishers.
