= Thomas, Count of Savoy =

Count of Savoy from 1189 to 1233

Thomas Ι
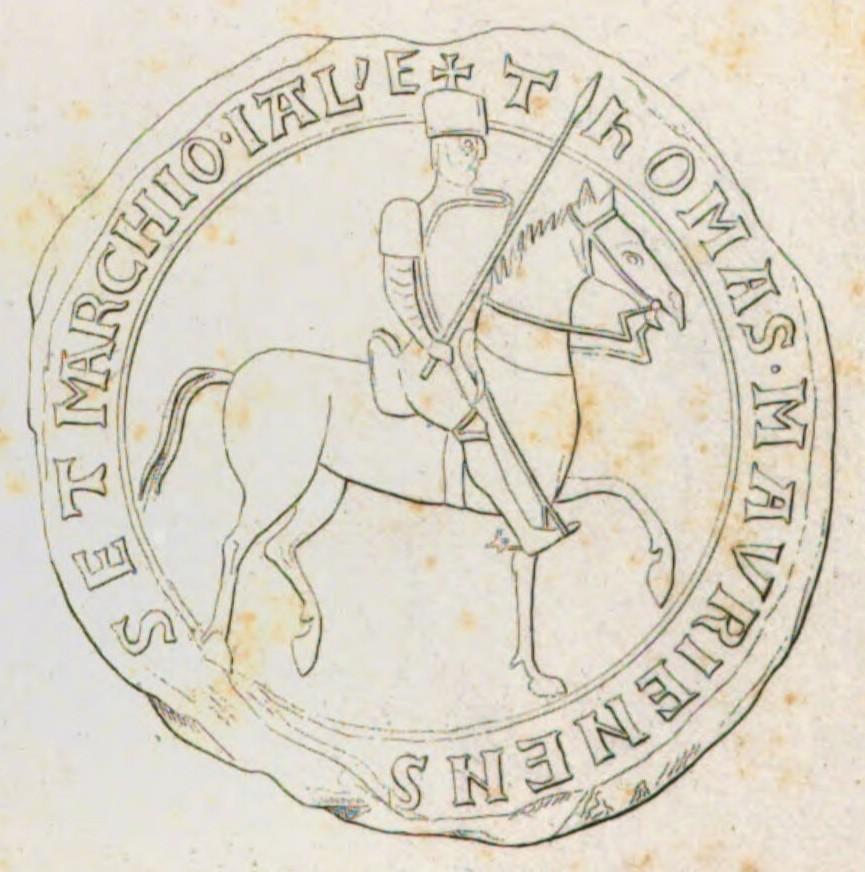
- Seal of Thomas I

Count of Savoy
- Reign: 1189–1233
- Predecessor: Humbert III
- Successor: Amadeus IV
- Born: c. 1178; Aiguebelle
- Died: 1 March 1233; Moncalieri
- Spouse: Margaret of Geneva
- Issue more...: Amadeus IV; Thomas ΙΙ; William of Savoy; Peter II; Philip I Boniface; Beatrice
- House: Savoy
- Father: Humbert III of Savoy
- Mother: Beatrice of Viennois

Thomas Ι (Tommaso I; c. 1178 – 1 March 1233) was Count of Savoy from 1189 to 1233. He is sometimes numbered "Thomas I" to distinguish him from his son of the same name. His long reign marked a decisive period in the history of Savoy.

== Biography ==
Thomas was born in Aiguebelle, the son of Humbert III of Savoy and Beatrice of Viennois. He was still a minor when his father died in 1189, and his mother acted as regent until 1191 during his minority reign. Despite his youth he began the push northwest into new territories. In the same year he granted Aosta Valley the "Charte des Franchises", recognising the right to administrative and political autonomy (this right was maintained until the French Revolution). Later he conquered Vaud, Bugey, and Carignano. He supported the Hohenstaufens, and was known as "Thomas the Ghibelline" because of his career as Imperial Vicar of Lombardy.

Thomas worked throughout his reign to expand the control and influence of the County of Savoy. One of the key tools that he used was his large number of children, whom he worked to get into positions of influence in neighbouring regions. In part, this was done by getting many of his sons into episcopal offices in surrounding territories, at a time when bishops had temporal as well as spiritual authority. In addition to William and Boniface, who made their careers in the clergy, their brother Thomas started out as a canon at Lausanne and became prévôt of Valence by 1226. Pietro was also a canon at Lausanne and served as acting bishop there until he was replaced in 1231. In 1219 he worked to get his daughter Beatrice married to the fourteen-year-old Ramon Berenguer IV, Count of Provence. This established a close relationship between the two adjoining counties which would help cement Savoy's control over trade between Italy and France.

Thomas fought many battles to expand his control. In 1215, his troops fought in an alliance with Milan against Monferrato, destroying the town of Casale. In 1222, he captured Cavour. He also worked through diplomatic and economic means to expand his control. The county of Savoy long enjoyed control over critical passes through the Alps. In his quest to gain more control over Turin, Thomas made an agreement with its rival Asti to reroute its French trade around Turin through Savoyard lands in a treaty on 15 September 1224. In 1226, Emperor Frederick II came to northern Italy and named Thomas Imperial Vicar of Lombardy. In this role, he mediated in a Genoese rebellion and a dispute between the town of Marseille and its bishop. Thomas also made a policy of granting franchises and charters to towns on key trade routes, which enabled the merchant class to develop more wealth and built support for his rule.

== Family and children ==
In 1195, Thomas ambushed the party of Count William I of Geneva, which was escorting the count's daughter, Margaret of Geneva, to France for her intended wedding to King Philip II of France. Thomas carried off Margaret and married her himself. They had:

1. Amadeus, married Margaret d'Albon and later married Cecile de Beaux
2. Humbert, d. between March and November 1223
3. Thomas, lord and then count in Piedmont and founder of a line that became the Savoy-Achaea, married Jeanne of Flanders, and later Beatrice de Fiesco
4. Aymon, d. 30 August 1237, Lord of Chablais
5. William, Bishop of Valence and Dean of Vienne
6. Amadeus, Bishop of Maurienne
7. Peter, who resided much in England, held the Honour of Richmond, and ultimately in 1263 became the disputed count of Savoy
8. Philip, archbishop of Lyon, who resigned, through marriage became Count Palatine of Burgundy and ultimately in 1268 became the disputed count of Savoy
9. Boniface, who became archbishop of Canterbury
10. Beatrice, d. 1265 or 1266, married in December 1219 to Ramon Berenguer IV, Count of Provence (1209–1245)
11. Alice (1209–1277), abbess of the monastery of St Pierre in Lyon (1250–1277)
12. Agatha, abbess of the monastery of St Pierre in Lyon (1277) following her sister's death (d. ?)
13. Margaret, d. 1273, married in 1218 to Hartmann IV of Kyburg
14. Avita (1215–92)

== Sources ==
- Chevalier, J. (1889). Quarante années de l'histoire des évêques de Valence. Paris.
- Cognasso, Francesco (1968). Il Piemonte nell'Età Sveva. Turin.
- Cognasso, Francesco (1940). Tommaso I ed Amedeo IV. Turin.
- Cox, Eugene L. (1974). The Eagles of Savoy. Princeton: Princeton University Press. ISBN 0691052166.
- Gee, Loveday Lewes (2002). Women, Art, and Patronage from Henry III to Edward III: 1216-1377. The Boydell Press.
- Previte-Orton, C.W. (1912). The Early History of the House of Savoy: 1000-1233. Cambridge University Press.
- Shacklock, Antonia (2021). "Henry III and the Native Saints". In Spencer, Andrew; Watkins, Carl (eds.). Thirteenth Century England XVII: Proceedings of the Cambridge Conference, 2017. The Boydell Press. pp. 23–40.
- Vaillant, P. (1960). "La Politique d'affranchisement des comtes de Savoie (1195-1401)". Études historiques à la mémoire de Noël Didier. Paris.

Thomas I House of Savoy Born: 1178 Died: 1 March 1233
Regnal titles
Preceded by Humbert III	Count of Savoy; 1189–1233	Succeeded by Amadeus IV
