= Thomas, Count of Flanders =

Count of Flanders from 1237 to 1244

Thomas II
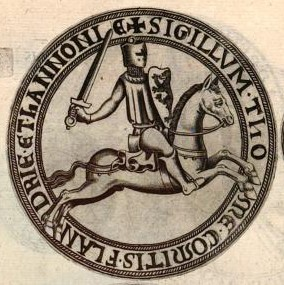

Lord (later Count) of Piedmont
- Reign: 1233–1259
- Born: c. 1199
- Died: 7 February 1259
- Spouses: Joan, Countess of Flanders; Beatrice Fieschi
- Issue: Thomas ΙΙΙ; Amadeus V Louis Ι Eleanor; Margaret; Alice
- House: Savoy
- Father: Thomas I of Savoy
- Mother: Margaret of Geneva

Thomas II (c. 1199 – 7 February 1259) was the Lord of Piedmont from 1233 to his death, Count of Flanders jure uxoris from 1237 to 1244, and regent of the County of Savoy from 1253 to his death, while his nephew Boniface was fighting abroad. He was the son of Thomas I of Savoy and Margaret of Geneva.

== Career ==
Thomas was born in Montmélian. He started his career in the church as a canon at Lausanne and became prévôt of Valence by 1226. In 1233, when Thomas I of Savoy died, Thomas, being a younger son, inherited only the lordship of Piedmont, which he later raised to the status of a county.

In 1235, when Thomas left his ecclesiastical career, he sought to fully divide his lands from the County of Savoy. His elder brother, Amadeus IV, negotiated with him to grant Thomas additional lands within the county, but that all lands would stay part of the county. Further, Thomas was encouraged like his other brothers to expand his holdings outside of Savoy.

In 1234, Thomas and his brother William escorted his niece, Margaret of Provence to her wedding with Louis IX of France. While Thomas hoped to stay with her at the French court, the king's mother, Blanche of Castile, wanted greater control over the new queen, and so dismissed all who came with her before the couple even reached Paris.

=== Count of Flanders ===
At the urging of Louis IX of France, Thomas married Joanna, Countess of Flanders and Hainaut, widow of Ferdinand, Count of Flanders and daughter of the Latin Emperor Baldwin I, in 1237.

His loyalties as Count of Flanders were divided between the kings of France and England. In 1239, Thomas travelled to England to pay homage to Henry III, King of England. While there, his niece, Eleanor of Provence, gave birth to Edward. After recognizing Henry as his suzerain, Thomas received an annual stipend of 500 marks. He returned to visit the family around Easter of 1240 and was given a gift which Henry III of England extracted from the lands of Simon de Montfort.

The count and countess were very generous toward local churches, and Thomas often followed his wife's lead on such matters. Thomas also understood the needs of the emerging merchant class, and worked to provide better rights for them. This included granting new charters and restructuring the governance in key cities such as Damme and Bruges.

In July 1243, Thomas and his brother Amadeus were ordered by Enzo of Sardinia to join in a siege of Vercelli, which had recently switched allegiances from the Empire to the Pope. Not only was the attack on the city unsuccessful, but the brothers were excommunicated for it. When the brothers wrote to the new Pope Innocent IV to appeal, he granted their request, and further indicated that Thomas would be protected from excommunication without papal authorization.

Thomas and Joanna had no issue and she died in 1244.

=== Later years ===
In 1255, Thomas was protecting his territories in the Piedmont region against the town of Asti. In a battle at Moncalieri, he was taken prisoner and held in Turin. The two cities were seeking to force Thomas to acknowledge their independence from Savoy control. In response, Pope Alexander IV placed an interdict against Turin and Asti, and King Henry III of England imprisoned all Lombards in his kingdom. Louis IX of France arrested 150 Asti merchants at the urging of his wife (and Thomas's niece) Margaret. Beatrice of Savoy did the same in her territories in Provence. Thomas's brothers, Peter and Philip led an army down from Savoy in 1256, and were able to force a negotiated settlement by the end of the year. In that settlement, the cities were recognized as independent, though they did not achieve the territorial or economic benefits they were originally seeking.

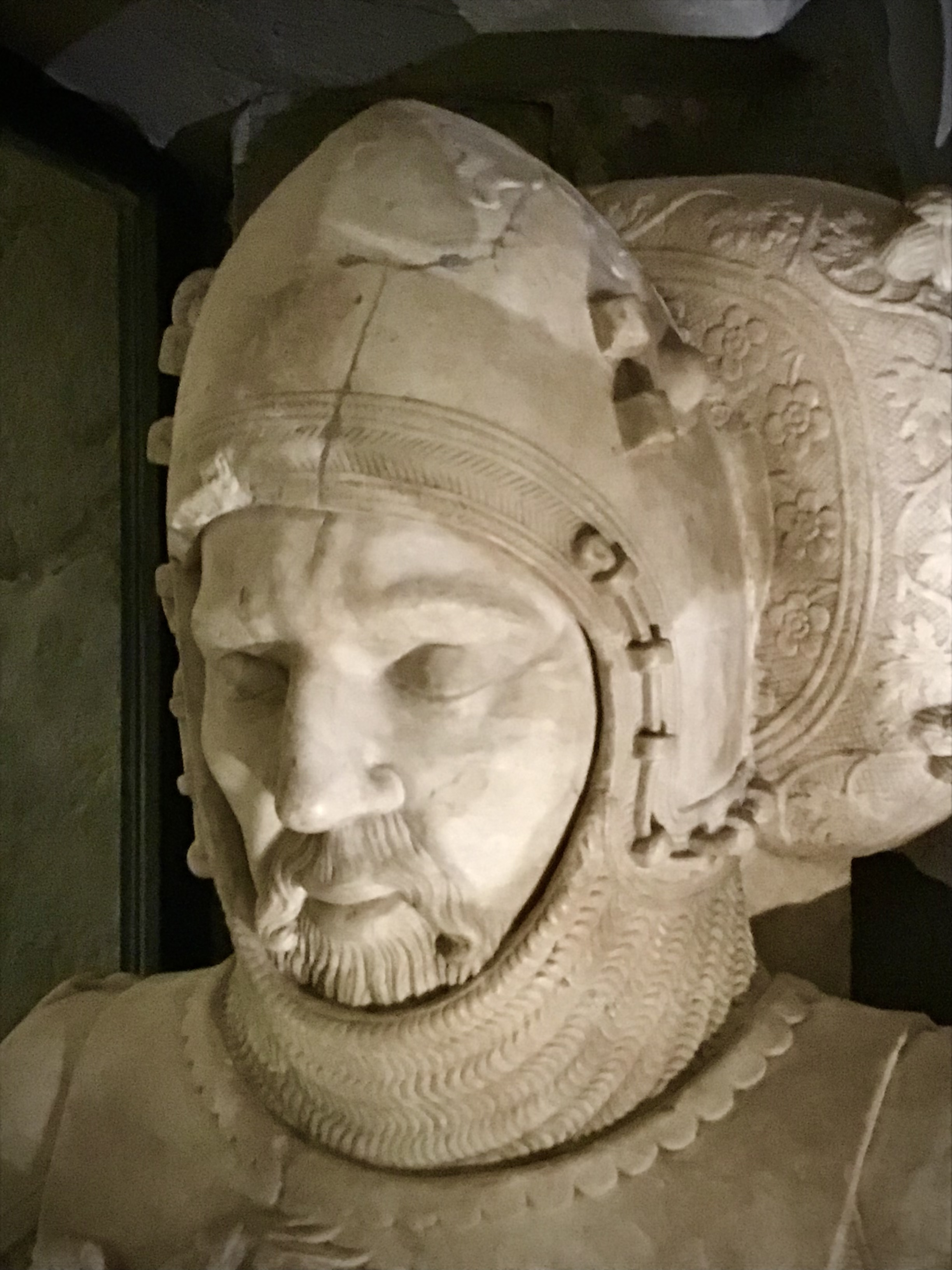
The tomb of Thomas II de Savoie at Aosta Cathedral

Although he was the next brother of Amadeus IV, he never became the Count of Savoy because he predeceased his nephew, Boniface, who himself died without sons to succeed him. Thomas did act as regent for Boniface during the early years of his reign. Although Thomas left sons, upon Boniface's death the remaining uncles, younger brothers of Thomas, ruled the County of Savoy. Thomas's eldest son and heir Thomas III thought it to be an injustice and unsuccessfully claimed Savoy. However, it so happened that Philip I, the last surviving brother of Thomas, made Thomas' younger son Amadeus his heir in Savoy, leaving the elder son, Thomas, and the genealogically senior line descending from him out of the Savoy succession.

== Issue ==
In 1252, Thomas married Beatrice Fieschi, who died on 15 July 1283, only daughter of Tedisio Fieschi, Count of Lavagna, by first wife Vigolan di Capo Corso, half-sister of Pope Adrian V and paternal niece of Pope Innocent IV. Thomas and Beatrice had six children:

- Thomas, his successor and pretender to the County of Savoy
- Amadeus, who later inherited Savoy
- Louis Ι (1250 – after 10 January 1302), Baron of Vaud
- Eleanor (died 6 December 1296), married (1270) Louis I of Beaujeu
- Margaret (died May 1292), married first Baldwin de Redvers, 7th Earl of Devon and after his death Sir Robert II Aguillon
- Alice (died 1 August 1277)

He also had at least three illegitimate children꞉

- Lancelot
- Nicolas
- Francis, married and had꞉
  - Peret, living in 1269

== Notes ==
Preceded by Thomas I	Count of Piedmont; 1233–1259	Succeeded by Thomas III
Preceded by Joan	Count of Flanders and Hainaut; 1237–1244 with Joan	Succeeded by Margaret II
