= William of Savoy =

Savoyard nobleman

William
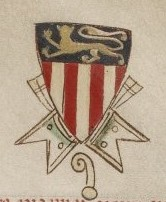
- Coat of arms of William of Savoy (Matthew Paris, c. 1255)
- Died: 1239; Viterbo
- Noble family: House of Savoy
- Father: Thomas, Count of Savoy
- Mother: Margaret of Geneva

William of Savoy (died 1239 in Viterbo, Italy) was a bishop from the House of Savoy. He was a son of Thomas, Count of Savoy and Margaret of Geneva. He was elected bishop of Valence in 1224. He negotiated the weddings of queens, and was an advisor to Henry III of England. Between his religious roles and his family relations, his influence was noted from London to Rome.

== Career in Savoy ==
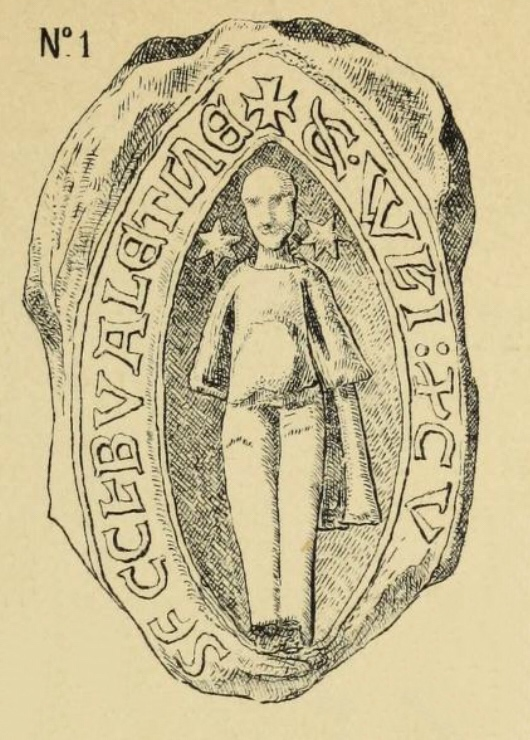
Seal of Guillaume de Savoie

Being at least the fourth son of a noble house, William's father Thomas sought for him positions in the church which would serve to strengthen the County of Savoy rather than diminish it. This included a request by 1220 to Henry III of England which led to William being responsible for the benefices of St Michael's on Wyre and Bingham. In 1220 he was also elected dean of the cathedral at Vienne, and in 1225 was elected bishop of Valence, replacing Gérold of Lausanne, who had just become patriarch of Jerusalem.

His job as bishop included temporal authority as well as spiritual, but this was contested by Ademar de Peiteus, Count of Valentinois. With the assistance of his kinfolk, William was able to defeat the forces of Ademar and negotiated a favorable peace treaty in 1231.

When their father died in 1233, William's brothers began to struggle for control of the various portions of the county. In July 1234, the brothers met at Château de Chillon, some bringing large armed forces with them. William played a key role in maintaining the integrity of the county under Amadeus IV of Savoy, with the others receiving significant portions under his authority. These portions were also designed to encourage those brothers to expand their authority outward from the county. The treaty they signed there required all the brothers to take arms against any one of them who violated the territory of another, and left William as the arbiter of any disputes.

== International Influence ==
William of Savoy lobbied to have his niece Margaret of Provence marry Louis IX of France, as this would bring prestige and influence to his family. He and his brother Thomas accompanied her to her wedding and coronation, but William was not invited to the court in Paris and sent home by Blanche of Castile with a few gifts.

William then labored to have Margaret's younger sister Eleanor marry Henry III of England. This succeeded and in 1236 he came with her to England. Henry made William the head of a council of advisors. Henry exchanged letters with Pope Gregory IX about how much he needed William in England. Granted the Honour of Richmond in August 1236. Henry then tried to have William selected as bishop of Winchester so that he could keep him as an adviser; the chapter resisted Henry on this. In 1237, William worked on behalf of his brother Thomas, Count of Flanders to convince Henry to release many Flemish merchants and restore better trade between England and Flanders. That same year, William was also a signing witness to a treaty between England and Scotland.

When Frederick II, Holy Roman Emperor called together an army to invade Italy in 1238, Henry chose William to accompany his force of 100 knights from Gascony, so that he could lead them through his Savoy's Alpine passes. He joined the imperial army in Turin, and then went on to participate in the siege of Brescia. His prowess during this was widely noted. Philippe Mousket recorded that he led his troops on 23 August to drive off a force coming in from Piacenza to help Brescia. He and his troops took 90 knights and 300 infantry prisoner, while the foe took only 5 prisoners.

In 1238 William secured election as Prince-Bishop of Liège. He died next year, in Italy (said to have been poisoned).
