= Walter of Ocra =

Walter's letter to Henry III. The large red initial M is from Magister Walterus de Ocra and the red rubric on the right identifies the text. The smaller red initial Q marks the beginning of the body of the letter.

Walter of Ocra (Italian: Gualtiero da Ocre, Latin: Gualterius de Ocra; c. 1200 – 1263) was an Italian nobleman, diplomat, churchman and administrator in the Kingdom of Sicily under the Staufer dynasty, to which he was intensely loyal throughout the war with the Papacy.

Walter's diplomatic missions took him to Germany, France and England between 1236 and 1248. He represented the Emperor Frederick II at the First Council of Lyon in 1245. Within Sicily, he was the baron of Ocre from 1246 to 1251 and again from 1253 to 1256. He was the bishop-elect of Valva in 1247–1248 and the archbishop-elect of Capua in 1247–1249, but his ecclesiastical career met strong opposition from Pope Innocent IV. He gave it up to take over the royal chancery.

Walter was the chancellor of Sicily from 1251 until his death. He was also the chancellor of the Kingdom of Jerusalem, at least in name, from 1254 to 1259. He was deeply involved in the regency and, after 1258, the rule of Manfred of Sicily.

== Early life ==
Walter was born around 1200 into the nobility of the Abruzzo. Berardo d'Ocre, who was lord of Butera in 1201 and count of Albe in 1222, may have been his father. Whatever the case, Walter had no inheritance rights to the barony of Ocre. By 1236, he was a chaplain in the imperial household and held the academic rank of magister. He probably completed his studies at the University of Naples.

== Diplomat ==
Walter represented Frederick II on numerous diplomatic missions in Italy, Germany, France and England between 1236 and 1248. The contemporary English chronicler Matthew Paris refers to him as the "usual ambassador" (nuncius consuetus). He made seven trips to England. His first stay lasted from February 1236 and May 1237. He pressured King Henry III of England to hand over the dowry of his sister, the Empress Isabella. In June–July 1237, he was back in England with Gilles Bertaud to collect the dowry.

In March 1238, he was a notary in the imperial chancery. That year, the emperor sent him to the court of his young son, Conrad IV, in Germany. From October 1239 until March 1240, Walter enjoyed the revenues from the vacant diocese of Valva in exchange for having loaned the emperor forty pounds. He went to England and back again in 1241. Matthew Paris recounts how he arrived too late to prevent a papal collection, so when he

learnt that the two [papal collectors] had escaped, he blamed the king's indolence, and immediately departed in sorrow and anger at having had his journey in vain: he, however, diliently followed their steps, carefully watching the meanderings of those foxes, in order to tell the emperor the result of his journey.

The said agents of the pope ... knowing that the said Walter was following them on foot, hastened their journey, not sparing their horses. After crossing the Alps, they secretly betook themselves to the cities and houses of their relatives, stowing away the money with which they had come loaded, in secret places, and not making their presence known to all; and as the said Walter could not find either them or the money, except only by slight whispering reports, he sent word to the emperor of everything, as well as of the fruitlessness of his search.

In June 1243, Walter went to France to negotiate the marriage of Conrad to the French princess Isabelle, a match which never took place. In 1244, he was in England between January and November, but it is unclear how many trips he took, as it does not appear he was there continuously. At a council of barons meeting in London in the presence of the king, Walter is said to have warned the assembly that Frederick may consider England an enemy, for continuing to aid the pope, and invade it, according to Matthew Paris. Nevertheless, Henry III granted him an annual pension of 40 marks that he continued to collect through 1248. At a later meeting in London, Walter sought to persuade the English clergy not to help fund Pope Innocent IV's war on Frederick. According to Matthew Paris, he read out letters from Baldwin II of Constantinople and Raymond VII of Toulouse attesting to the emperor's orthodoxy.

In June 1245, Walter and Taddeo da Sessa represented Frederick II at the First Council of Lyon. After conferring with Frederick in Verona, he returned to Lyon with Pietro della Vigna only to find that the council had already deposed Frederick on 17 July. In early September, he and Pietro were invited by King Louis IX of France to explain Frederick's position. At the time, Walter, Taddeo and Pietro were Frederick's "chief advisors" and "best lawyers".

Walter's last trip to England was in 1246. From the continent, Walter sent a report, written on his own initiative, describing the failed conspiracy of Capaccio against the emperor in July 1246. He wrote that Frederick wanted to parade the traitors around Europe "with the impression of the papal bull, discovered in their possession, stamped on their foreheads". Frederick ordered the execution of leading conspirator, Tebaldo Francesco, and confiscated the barony of Ocre, which Tebaldo had administered on behalf of the heirs of Berardo II d'Ocre. Frederick gave the barony to Walter. Walter's letter was copied by Alexander of Swereford into the Red Book of the Exchequer and from there into Matthew Paris's chronicle. It is one of the last records in the Red Book, since Swereford died on 1 November. In the same letter, Walter informs Henry III about the battle of Frankfurt that took place in Germany in August 1246, during which Conrad IV was defeated by a papal-backed rival, Henry Raspe.

On 21 April 1247, Walter was in Chambéry as Frederick's procurator to sign the marriage contract between Frederick's son Manfred, future king of Sicily, and Beatrice, the widow of Marquis Manfred III of Saluzzo. According to rumours current in England and reported by Matthew Paris, he attempted to have Innocent IV assassinated in Lyon that year. A certain knight named Ralph allegedly confessed under torture that Walter offered him 300 talents to kill the pope, whom Walter supposedly described as "an evident usurer, a furnace of simony, thirsting after and grabbing all of the money he can". In 1248–1249, he was with the imperial court in northern Italy. In late 1248, he negotiated an alliance between Frederick and Marquis Boniface II of Montferrat. Frederick II then raised him into a familiaris of the imperial household. Willem Zwalve explains Walter's exceptional loyalty to the emperor:

The higher officials in the civil service, men like ... Walter of Ocra, were well aware of the fact that baronial resistance was not only directed against the king, but also against them, men who had risen to high office by sheer competence rather than noble birth. There was a strong esprit de corps among the royal officials focusing on the integrity with which they served the king. It was by virtue of their probitas that they excelled and formed a true nobility of merit rather than of descent.

== Churchman ==
Walter's ecclesiastical career got off to a rocky start. On 1 February 1247, Innocent IV deemed him unworthy of the provostry of Sant'Eusanio in the diocese of Forcona and removed him. He had acquired it sometime after 1238, through political influence, and Innocent's revocation went without effect. Walter handed it over to his nephew, Thomas de Fossa, who was still holding it in 1310.

Between the autumn of 1246 and March 1247, Walter was elected archbishop of Capua. About the same time, he was elected to the still vacant diocese of Valva, although his preferential use of the title electus Capuanus suggests that he never intended to be consecrated bishop of Valva. On 3 October 1247, Innocent nullified Walter's election in Valva on the grounds that it had been imposed by the secular authorities and ordered Cardinal Stefano de Normandis dei Conti to have him removed from the bishopric.

Despite the oppotison of the pope, Walter was still exercising power as bishop-elect in Valva in 1248, when had work done on the church of San Pelino. With the support of Frederick, he administered Capua as archbishop-elect until June 1249, when he resigned it to become head of the royal chancery following the arrest and death of Pietro della Vigna. His last act was to seek the restitution of property held by Della Vigna's family. He may have resigned Valva at the same time or slightly earlier. He was with the imperial court by February 1250.

== Chancellor ==
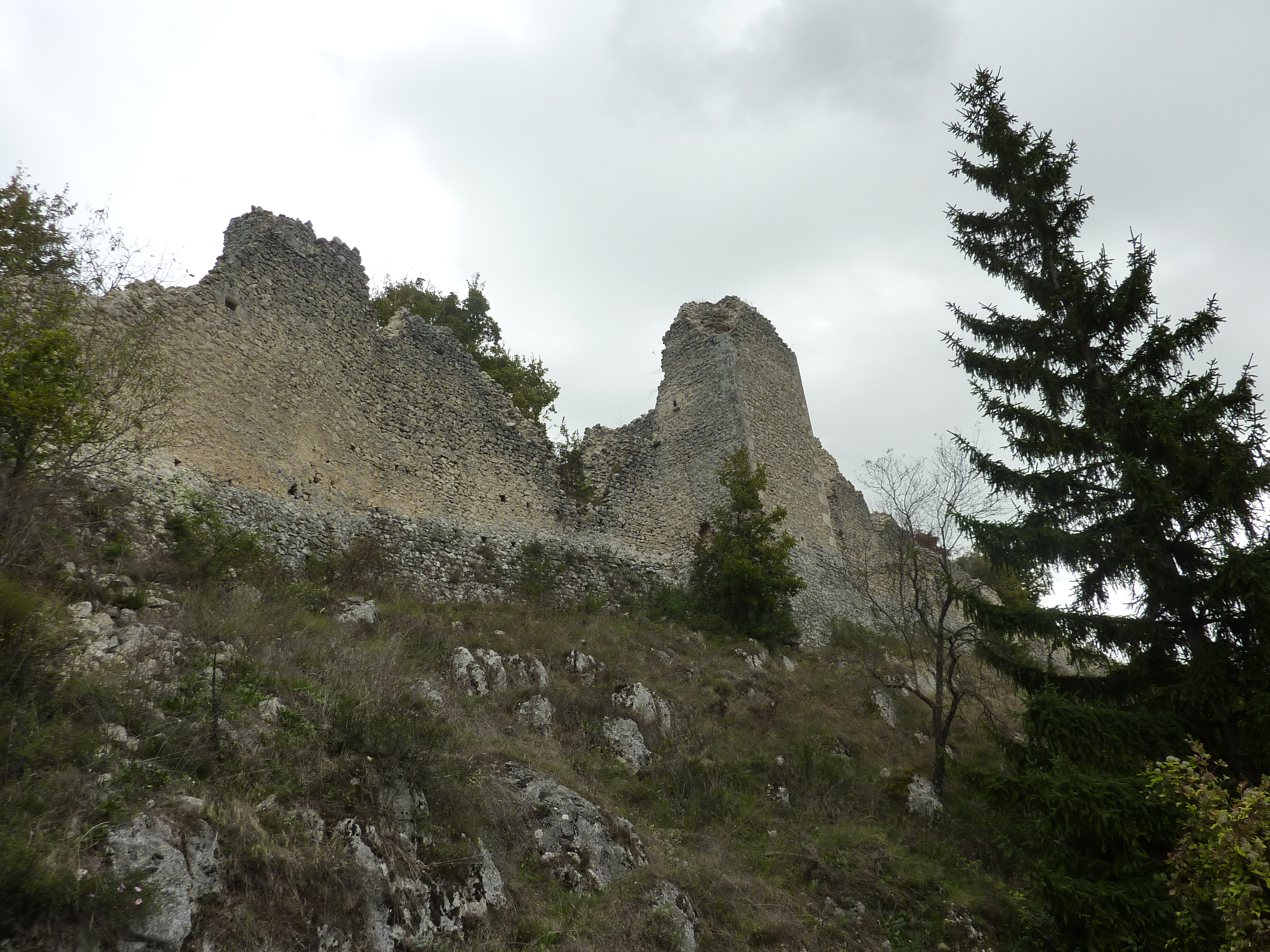
Ruins of the castle of Ocre

Walter initially ran the chancery without the title of chancellor. In November 1251, Walter travelled to northern Italy to meet Conrad IV, who had succeeded Frederick II the previous year. Conrad confirmed him as chancellor of the Kingdom of Sicily. That same year, Walter lost the barony of Ocre, which Conrad bestowed on Thomas of Celano.

Walter returned to the kingdom by sea with Conrad IV. In 1252, Conrad sent him, along with Archbishop James of Trani and Berthold von Hohenburg, to Perugia to negotiate with Innocent IV for recognition of Conrad and an end to the war between Papacy and Empire. Walter, with Berthold von Hohenburg and Frederick of Antioch, accompanied Manfred to a parley with the pope in Anagni in August. An agreement in principle was reached on 8 September, but it soon broke down. Although Innocent's biographer, Niccolò da Calvi, praises the skill of Walter as a diplomat. In 1253, Walter accompanied Conrad IV to the siege of Naples and the barony of Ocre was restoerd to him. In January 1254, Conrad appointed him chancellor of the Kingdom of Jerusalem, which crown he had inherited from his mother.

In 1254, following Conrad IV's death, Walter supported the regency of Manfred on behalf of the Conrad's young son, Conradin, refusing to recognize the Sicilian claim of the English prince Edmund, despite his prior close ties to the English court. He was with Manfred during the negotiations with the pope at Anagni in July. In the fall, he and Goffredo da Cosenza were sent to Troia to negotiate with the papal legate Guglielmo Fieschi. In February 1255, he was given the captured rebel town of Mesagne in fief and ordered it razed. In 1256, he transferred the barony of Ocre to Galvano Lancia, who was married to a relative, Margherita d'Ocre. In exchange, he received the town of Vieste. In July 1257, he was in Melfi for the ratification of the treaty with the Republic of Genoa and, in September, he was at San Gervasio for the signing of a treaty with the Republic of Venice.

Walter continued as chancellor after Manfred was crowned king in 1258, signing almost every document issued by the king. He ceased using the title chancellor of Jerusalem only after July 1259, but he continued as chancellor of Sicily until his death. From 1261, however, his responsibilities were sometimes shared. His last attested document dates to March 1263 at Foggia and he probably died in that month or the next.

== Bibliography ==
- Berger, Élie, ed. (1884). Les registres d'Innocent IV. Vol. 1. Paris: E. Thorin.
- Eubel, Conradus, ed. (1913). Hierarchia catholica. Vol. 1 (2nd ed.). Münster: Libreria Regensbergiana.
- Giles, J. A., ed. (1852). Matthew Paris's English History: From the Year 1235 to 1273. Vol. 1. Henry G. Bohn.
- Giles, J. A., ed. (1853). Matthew Paris's English History: From the Year 1235 to 1273. Vol. 2. Henry G. Bohn.
- Greasley, Nathan (2018). Networks and Information Gathering in the World of Matthew Paris (PDF) (PhD dissertation). Aberystwyth University.
- Hufschmid, Michelle T. (2020). The Crusade Against the Staufer in Germany, 1246–51 (PhD dissertation). University of Oxford.
- Kamp, Norbert (1973). Kirche und Monarchie im staufischen Königreich Sizilien, 1: Prosopographische Grundlegung: Bistümer und Bischöfe des Königreichs 1194–1266, 1: Abruzzen und Kampanien. Munich: Wilhelm Fink.
- Kantorowicz, Ernst (1957) [1931]. Frederick the Second, 1194–1250. Translated by E. O. Lorimer. Frederick Ungar.
- Loud, G. A. (2003). "The Kingdom of Sicily and the Kingdom of England, 1066–1266". History. 88 (292): 540–567.
- Pio, Berardo (2013). "Ocre, Gualtiero da". Dizionario Biografico degli Italiani (in Italian). Vol. 79: Nursio–Ottolini Visconti. Rome: Institute of the Italian Encyclopaedia. ISBN 978-88-12-00032-6.
- Rossi, G. B. (1829). Memoriale di notizie storico-critiche spettanti a Gualtieri da Ocra gran cancelliere de' regni di Sicilia e Gerusalemme. Naples.
- Van Cleve, Thomas C. (1972). The Emperor Frederick II of Hohenstaufen: Immutator Mundi. Clarendon Press.
- Weiler, Björn K. U. (2006). Henry III of England and the Staufen Empire, 1216–1272. Boydell Press.
- Whalen, Brett Edward (2019). The Two Powers: The Papacy, the Empire, and the Struggle for Sovereignty in the Thirteenth Century. University of Pennsylvania Press.
- Zwalve, Willem J. (2023). Power and Authority, A Trial of Two Swords: A History of the Union of the Holy Roman Empire and the Kingdom of Sicily (1186–1250). Eleven.
