= Giacomo Boncambio =

Italian friar (c. 1200–1260)

Giacomo Boncambio or Boncambi (c. 1200 – 3 Ocobter 1260) was an Italian Dominican friar who served as the papal vicechancellor (1239–1244) and then bishop of Bologna (1244–1260). He led a papal diplomatic mission to England in 1255.

Boncambio was born into a merchant family in Bologna around 1200. His parents' names were Guido and Francesca. He had two brothers: Guido, who became a judge, and Niccolò. It is probable that he studied law at the University of Bologna. In 1233, he joined the Dominicans after hearing a sermon by Giovanni da Vicenza.

A staunch Guelph, Boncambio addressed a letter to the citizens of Bologna, probably in 1239, encouraging them to throw off the authority of King Enzo, son of Emperor Frederick II, and to resist an imperial invasion of the March of Ancona. He worked in the Apostolic Chancery and in 1238–1239 was appointed its vicechancellor by Pope Gregory IX. He remained in that post under Popes Celestine IV and Innocent IV until June 1244, when he became bishop of Bologna. The seem had become vacant when Ottaviano degli Ubaldini became a cardinal. Innocent quashed the election of his successor on grounds of irregularity and provided Boncambio, who was succeeded as vicechancellor by Marino da Eboli.

Boncambio's episcopate was characterized by good relations with the commune of Bologna. In 1250, he permitted the demolition of a parish church to allow for the expansion of the public palace. In 1255, he agreed to turn over any fugitives from communal justice who should seek refuge in episcopal lands. His episcopate also coincided with a civic crackdown on Catharism, including the first burning at the stake.

During the war against the Staufer, Boncambio was present with the Bolognese troops at the siege of Imola in 1248. In 1251, he hosted Innocent IV when the latter stopped in Bologna on his return from the First Council of Lyon. In May 1255, he set out for England to wrap up the so-called Sicilian business. On 1 June, he wrote to Pope Alexander IV announcing a truce that he had mediated between several Milanese factions while en route. By the fall, he was in England. On 18 October, he invested Prince Edmund with the kingdom of Sicily. He left England soon after, returning to the continent with the Castilian ambassador, archbishop-elect Sancho of Toledo.

Boncambio died on 3 Ocobter 1260 as a result of an injury suffered at his villa in Massumatico. He was buried in San Domenico.

== Works cited ==
- Dansereau, Raymond (2015). Servasanto da Faenza: Preaching and Penance in the Work of a Thirteenth-Century Franciscan (PhD diss.). Rutgers University.
- Parmeggiani, Riccardo (2018). "Mendicant Orders and the Repression of Heresy". In Sarah R. Blanshei (ed.). A Companion to Medieval and Renaissance Bologna. Brill. pp. 411–435.
- Waley, Daniel (1969). "Boncambio, Giacomo". Dizionario Biografico degli Italiani (in Italian). Vol. 11: Boccadibue–Bonetti. Rome: Istituto dell'Enciclopedia Italiana. ISBN 978-88-12-00032-6.
