= Castle of Sant'Eusanio Forconese =

Medieval castle in Abruzzo, Italy

Castello di Sant'Eusanio Forconese
- Sant'Eusanio Forconese
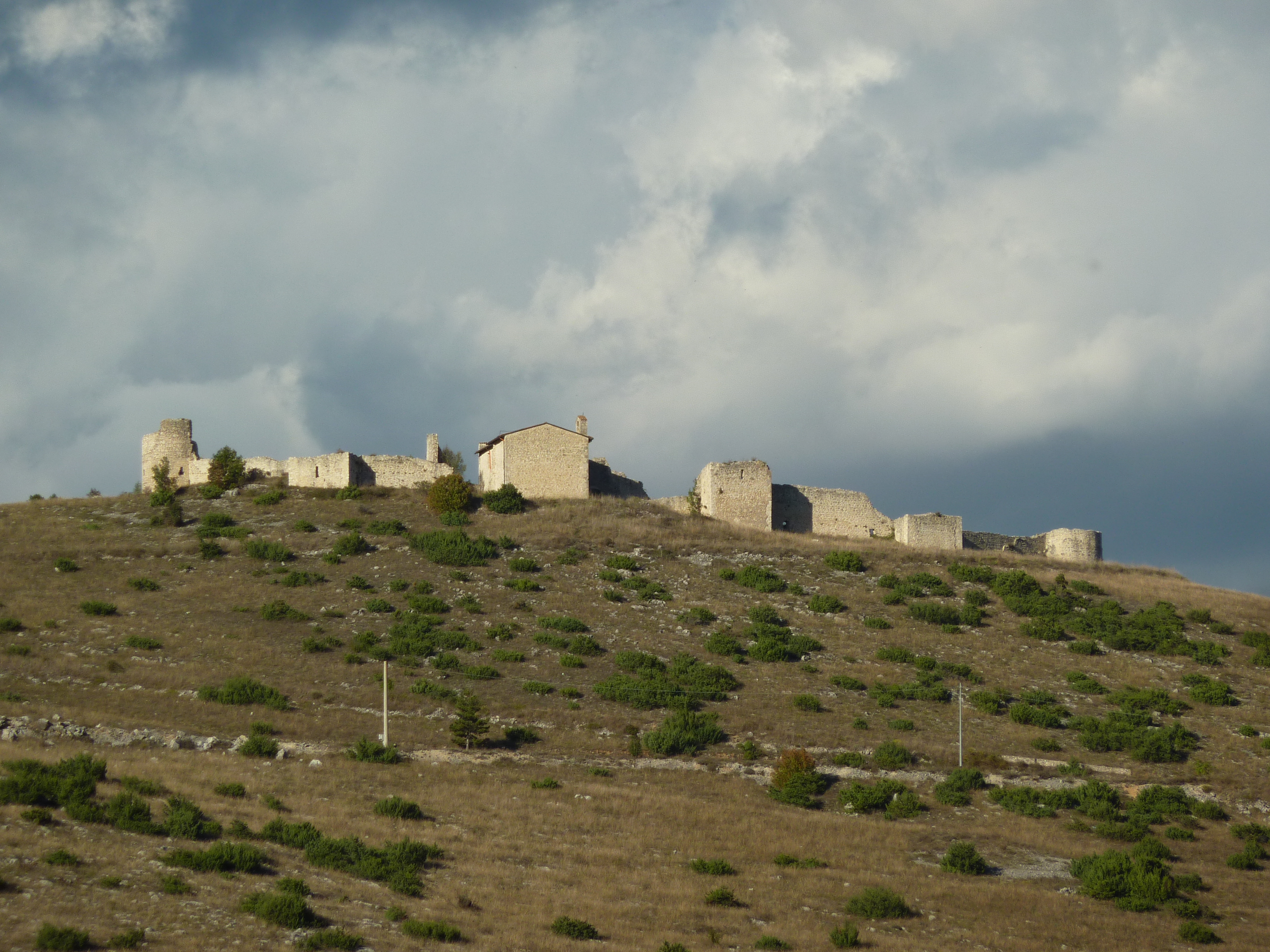
- Castle of Sant'Eusanio Forconese

Site information
- Type: Castle

Location
- Coordinates: 42.293961°N 13.520878°E

Site history
- Built: 12th-13th century

The Castle of Sant'Eusanio Forconese is a medieval castle in Sant'Eusanio Forconese, Province of L'Aquila, Abruzzo, southern Italy.

== History ==
The building has a structure of an enclosure castle to provide shelter to the population in case of danger. The presence of a tank of drinking water, suggests that the structure was able to provide shelter for long periods of time, in contrast to other enclosure castles the area.

Its position in the mid of the valley of the Aterno-Pescara river, among the Castles of Ocre, of San Pio delle Camere and of Barisciano, made it a strategic component for the defense of L'Aquila.

== Architecture ==
The castle has a square plan with walls connecting five semi-circular towers (between three and five meters of internal diameter) and four square towers. The walls have a thickness of about one meter and a height varying from five to seven meters. On the western side of the walls, with no natural defenses, the castle is protected by a moat.

The entrance is an arched door in a square tower, close to the church of Our Lady of the Castle. This church was built inside the enclosure in the 17th-18th century, when the castle lost its defensive function.
