= Beatrice of Falkenburg =

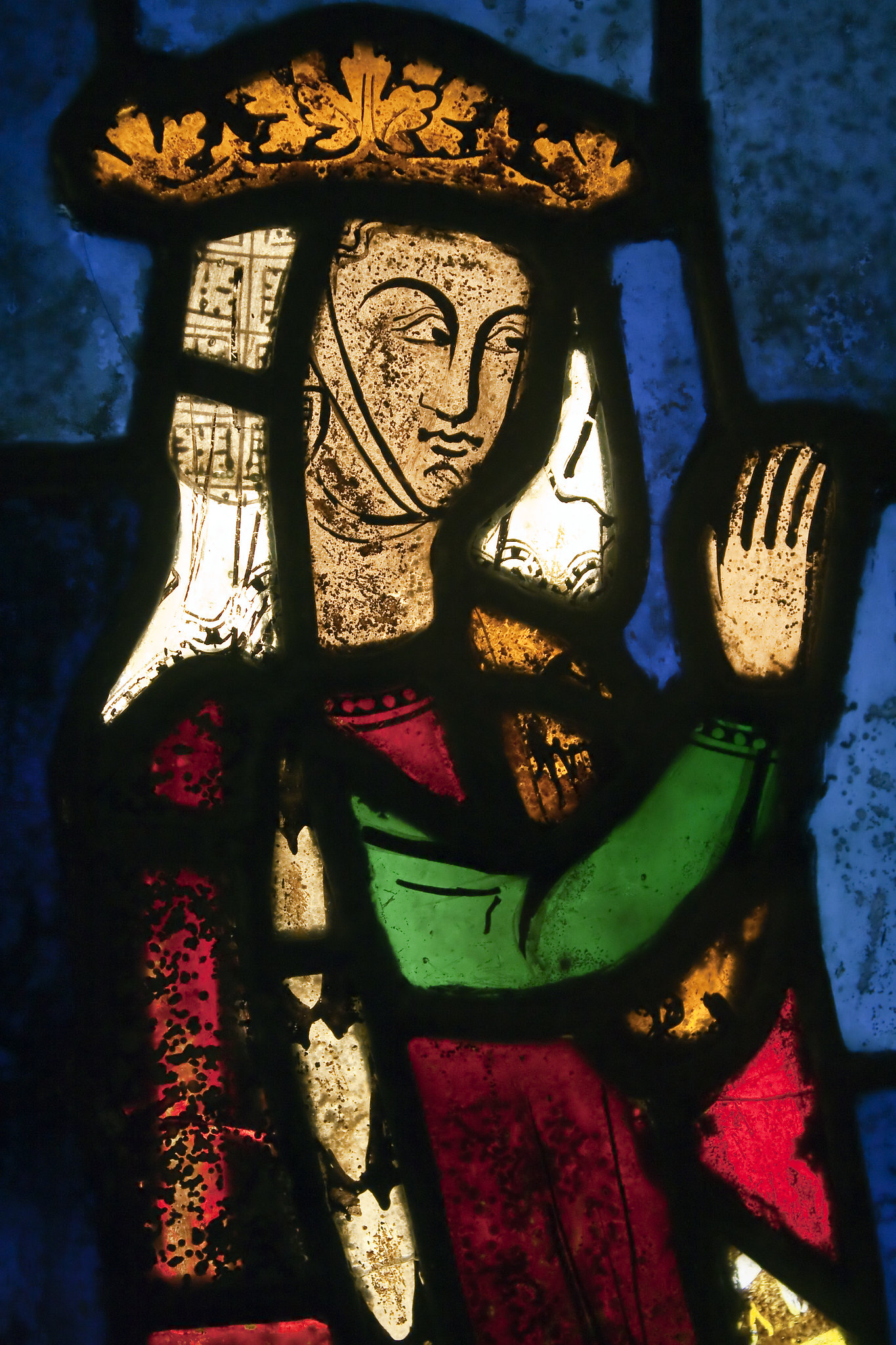
- The stained-glass window depicting Beatrice as benefactress to the Franciscans is the only surviving portrait of her. It is now part of the Burrell Collection.

Queen of the Romans
- Tenure: 16 June 1269 – 2 April 1272
- Born: c. 1254
- Died: 17 October 1277 (aged 23); Oxford, England
- Burial: Greyfriars, Oxford
- Spouse: Richard of Cornwall
- House: Cleves
- Father: Theodoric II, Lord of Valkenburg
- Mother: Bertha of Limburg

Beatrice of Falkenburg (c. 1254 – 17 October 1277), also referred to as Beatrix of Valkenburg, was the third and last wife of Richard of Cornwall, and as such nominally queen of Germany.

Daughter of Dirk II van Valkenburg, and his first wife, Bertha, daughter of Walram IV, Duke of Limburg. She and Richard were married on 16 June 1269 in Kaiserslautern when she was only 16 years old and Richard was 60. They had no children. After Richard's death, Beatrice chose to stay in England until her death in 1277 at the age of 23, and she was buried at the Friars Minors at Oxford.

== Background ==
One of several children of Dirk II and Bertha of Limburg, Beatrice was born into the Meuse-Rhineland aristocracy. Her father was a supporter of Richard of Cornwall's claim to the imperial crown of Germany following Richard's coronation in Aachen. Her paternal uncle, Engelbert II of Valkenburg, archbishop-elector of Cologne, was neither loyal to Richard nor interested in him, but when he became imprisoned during the turmoil, when Richard's candidacy was opposed by Alfonso X of Castile who was elected by Saxony, Brandenburg and Trier, Richard decided to liberate him. In October 1268, the king along with the lord of Valkenburg invaded the electorate of Cologne, only to be completely defeated; Beatrice's father was killed in the struggle and her uncle remained imprisoned.

== Marriage and queenship ==
During the conflict, Richard became infatuated with Beatrice, then 15 years old and renowned for her beauty. Concerned for her safety, Richard had her taken to her paternal half-uncle, Philip of Bolanden-Hohenfels, and soon began negotiating marriage with her. Beatrice became his third wife and queen of Germany (formally "queen of the Romans") in Kaiserslautern on 16 June 1269. With her father dead and her powerful uncle hopelessly imprisoned, Beatrice was not a political asset; Richard married her simply because he was attracted to her and was unable to be separated from her for even one night. The chronicler Thomas Wykes nevertheless emphasises the political significance of the marriage: Beatrice was German and would bring the English king of Germany closer to his subjects and to his kingdom.

As no invitation to Rome for the couple's coronation as emperor and empress of the Holy Roman Empire was forthcoming, Richard announced that he wished to show Beatrice his vast lands in England and departed from Germany. They reached Dover on 3 August 1269 but neither ever returned to Germany.

== Widowhood ==
Queen Beatrice was widowed in 1272. The couple had no children. Her husband was buried next to his second wife, Sanchia of Provence, but Beatrice may have organised the burial of his heart at the Franciscan church at Greyfriars, Oxford. She led an extremely low-profile life, almost disappearing from historical records. Her brother-in-law, King Henry III of England, sent her gifts in 1272, as did her nephew, King Edward I, in 1276. She was at odds with her stepson, Edmund, 2nd Earl of Cornwall, over part of his mother Sanchia's dower, but that was settled in February 1276. A portrait of Beatrice in stained glass, the oldest, undamaged, still-existing donor portrait, was made by Norwich Greyfriars and is now part of the Burrell Collection in Glasgow. It was thought to originate from the Franciscan church in Oxford, which would have indicated that Beatrice was a significant benefactress to the order. This is the only indication that Beatrice donated to the Church. She died aged 23 on 17 October 1277. She was buried at Greyfriars, Oxford, as queen of Germany.

Beatrice of Falkenburg House of Cleves Born: c. 1254 Died: 17 October 1277
Royal titles
Vacant Title last held by Sanchia of Provence	Queen of the Romans; 1269–1272	Vacant Title next held by Gertrude of Hohenberg
