= Marino Filomarino =

Marino Filomarino (1205/10 – 10 March 1286), also known as Marino da Eboli or Marinus Neapoletanus, was a Neapolitan canon lawyer who served as the papal vicechancellor from 1244 to 1252 and the archbishop of Capua from 1269 until his death, having been archbishop-elect in 1252–1258 and 1264–1269.

Marino was the rare scholar-bishop in 13th-century Italy. He wrote two treatises on chancery practice and a large formulary circulated under his name, although he could only have begun it, leaving others to complete it. He was a friend of Thomas Aquinas and, on the eve of the Second Council of Lyon in 1274, encouraged George Akropolites to pen his work On Saints Peter and Paul. His eloquence, education and good conscience were praised by Saba Malaspina.

== Early life ==
Marino was born in Naples between 1205 and 1210. His father, Tommaso, belonged to the knightly class. Deno Geanakoplos wonders whether he was of Calabrian Greek extraction. His mother, Gayta, belonged to the Eboli family, making him a relative of Cardinal Thomas of Capua. Her family was also of knightly rank and Marino sometimes used her surname.

Little is known of Marino's life before he became vicechancellor. He may be the Neapolitan cleric named Marino who was part of a commission sent to resolve a dispute between the bishop of Bologna, Enrico della Fratta, and the canons of Santa Maria di Reno and San Salvatore. A certain Giovanni da Eboli, perhaps a relative, was also on this commission. Marino was an expert in canon law and he may have studied at the University of Bologna.

== Vicechancellor ==
Pope Innocent IV appointed Marino vicechancellor in June 1244 in Genoa, having left Rome in the midst his war with the Emperor Frederick II. Marino was tasked with organizing the chancery in Lyon for the First Council of Lyon. He and chancery remained in Lyon until 1251. In 1246, he was provided for his maintenance the incomes of benefices in England, but he was forced to renounce the treasurership of Salisbury Cathedral. He never visited England.

Start of Super revocatoriis in the manuscript Vat. lat. 3975

During his time as vicechancellor, Marino wrote two treatises on chancery practice, Super revocatoriis and De confirmationibus. There is a formulary, Collectio diversarum litterarum et formarum ac processuum secundum stilum Romane curie, attached to the name of Marinus de Eboli, but in its surviving form it was completed in the 1270s, long after Marino left the chancery. Solomon Grayzel thinks the original formulary was compiled by Marino between leaving the chancery in 1251 and becoming archbishop of Capua in 1266. It was extended by others. The fullest form contains documents from as late as the papacy of Nicholas IV (r. 1288–1292).

Super revocatoriis and De confirmationibus are transmitted alongside the Collectio diversarum and also alongside another formulary, the Formularium audientiae litterarum contradictarum. According to Gaines Post, Super revocatoriis "deals with the papal rescripts which in reply to petitions of those who appealed from acts and sentences of lower courts appointed judges delegate to review the cases and render final sentence", while De confirmationibus "deals with papal letters which as a result of petitions were issued to confirm all kinds of rights, donations, privileges, judicial sentences and statutes of ecclesiastical corporations."

== Archbishop-elect ==
In January 1252, after the archbishop-elect Gualtiero di Ocre renounced the see, Innocent IV named Marino archbishop of Capua. He travelled to the city in the summer of 1252, but was forced to return to Rome in the spring of 1253, when it submitted to Conrad IV, son and heir of Frederick II. A rival bishop governed Capua until the death of Conrad allowed Marino to return in October 1254. In June 1255, at Marino's request, Pope Alexander IV consecrated the new altar in the cathedral. In March 1256, Marino divided the barony of Rossella, a fief of the church, in favour of his own brother, Giacomo.

Marino was at Rome, in exile again from Capua, in February 1257, living off the income from his English benefices. In June 1258, he was selected to be sent as apostolic legate to Outremer and replace Jacques Pantaléon as patriarch of Jerusalem, but he refused. Sometime later he resigned his archdiocese because he had not been consecrated within six months of his election as required by a constitution promulgated by Alexander IV in 1255.

In 1261, the "former archbishop" Marino procured from Pope Urban IV a dispensation for his brother to marry Marotta Caracciola. During the papacy of Urban IV, he developed a friendship with Thomas Aquinas, to which his nephew, Niccolò Filomarino, testified at Thomas's canonization hearings in 1319. In 1262, he was engaged in an intellectual exchange with Thomas, James of Viterbo and Hugh of Saint-Cher regarding questions posed by James about the relationship between deferment of payment and usury. Thomas refers to these discussions in his De emptione et vendition ad tempus. In January 1263, Marino was a papal chaplain with a canonry at Tours. In 1264, Marino was reappointed archbishop of Capua. He did not arrive in Capua until March 1266, with Andrea Riccardi, bishop of Caiazzo, serving as his vicar. By May 1269, he had been consecrated.

== Archbishop of Capua ==
Marino was the rare scholar-bishop in 13th-century Italy. In 1273, Pope Gregory X charged Marino with formulating questions for debate at the Second Council of Lyon. In 1274, when George Akropolites stopped in Capua on his way to the Lyon, Marino requested him to write an encomium On Saints Peter and Paul, which he composed in Greek. Marino attended the council in 1274, where he and Archbishop Matteo della Porta of Salerno raised complaints about Charles I with the latter's suzerain, the pope. Saba Malaspina, no friend of Charles, praises Marino for his eloquence, education and good conscience.

Marino represented the "idealist" faction within the south Italian church that expected a complete restoration of all ecclesistical lands and rights that had been lost or curtailed under Frederick II and his successors. A dispute between Marino and Bertrando II del Balzo over the services owed by several vassals of the church played out between 1272 and 1276. Although King Charles I finally sided with the archbishop, the two had a wide-ranging dispute in 1278–1279. The subvention Marino demanded from the Capuans for his trip to Lyon, the violent behaviour of his relatives and the church's possession of Castel Volturno were all at issue. The dispute may have been partially resolved when Marino baptized Charles's grandson, the future King Robert, in the Torre di Sant'Erasmo, but Pope Nicholas III was intervening on the archbishop's behalf over the Castle Volturno in April 1280.

Marino died, probably at Capua, on 10 March 1286. He was buried in Capua Cathedral.
