= Giacomo (archbishop of Trani, 1227–1260) =

Catholic archbishop

Giacomo (Latin: Jacobus, English: James, Jacob) was the archbishop of Trani between 1227 and 1260. He was an "ambiguous figure" in the clash between the Church and the Empire.

Nothing is known of Giacomo's family or early life. When elected archbishop of Trani, he was too young to be consecrated, so Pope Honorius III confirmed him only as procurator on 27 January 1227. At the time he was the dean of the cathedral of Reggio, which suggests that he may have been a native of Calabria. Before the end of 1227, he travelled to the papal curia, where Pope Gregory IX confirmed him as archbishop and sent him back. The earliest document to refer to him as archbishop is dated 11 December 1227.

In 1228, Giacomo and the bishop of Giovinazzo arbitrated a dispute between Archbishop Marino Filangieri of Bari and the monastery of Ognissanti di Cuti. Gregory IX charged Giacomo with reforming his own clergy and several monasteries. He did not share the pope's zeal for reform, however. He visited the Emperor Frederick II at Melfi in 1232. In 1236, he ignored an order to investigate an appeal from the abbey of Santa Maria a Mare and instead travelled to northern Italy to visit the emperor. In 1237, Gregory took from him the reform of the Abbey of Santa Maria de Pulsano and oversight of its abbatial election that Giacomo had previously been assigned.

Although Giacomo is sometimes regarded as a Dominican himself, he clashed with the Dominicans in Barletta, eliciting a papal reprimand.

In 1239, he went north again to the imperial court. He effectively ignored the deposition of Frederick II by the First Council of Lyon in 1245 and Pope Innocent IV's placing the kingdom of Sicily under the interdict. In the spring of 1252, Conrad IV sent him, along with Walter of Ocra and Berthold von Hohenburg, to Perugia to negotiate with Innocent IV for recognition of Conrad and an end to the war between Papacy and Empire. Although Innocent's biographer, Niccolò da Calvi, praises the skill of the diplomats, the negotiations were unsuccessful. In July, as a result of this legation, Innocent granted privileges to Giacomo protecting him from excommunication and interdict.

His relationship with the papacy restored, Giacomo was granted authority over abbatial elections and charged with removing a pro-imperial bishop from the diocese of Muro Lucano. In June 1257, Pope Alexander IV asked him to help advance pro-papal candidates in the diocese of Canne and Terlizzi. In 1258, however, when Manfred was crowned king, Giacomo supported him. By February 1259, Manfred had appointed him the rationalis of the mainland provinces. In his last act, dated October 1260, Giacomo made a grant to the cathedral chapter. He was dead by November 1263.

== Sources ==
- Brentano, Robert (1988). Two Churches: England and Italy in the Thirteenth Century. University of California Press.
- Eubel, Conradus, ed. (1913). Hierarchia catholica. Vol. 1 (2nd ed.). Münster: Libreria Regensbergiana.
- Kamp, Norbert (1975). Kirche und Monarchie im staufischen Königreich Sizilien, 1: Prosopographische Grundlegung: Bistümer und Bischöfe des Königreichs 1194–1266, 2: Apulien und Kalabrien. Munich: Wilhelm Fink.
- Pio, Berardo (2013). "Ocre, Gualtiero da". Dizionario Biografico degli Italiani (in Italian). Vol. 79: Nursio–Ottolini Visconti. Rome: Istituto dell'Enciclopedia Italiana. ISBN 978-88-12-00032-6.
- Rivera Magos, Victor (2020). Milites Baroli: Signori e poteri a Barletta tra XII e XIII secolo. Federico II University Press.
