= Berkhamsted Castle =

Norman castle in Hertfordshire, England

- Berkhamsted, Hertfordshire in England
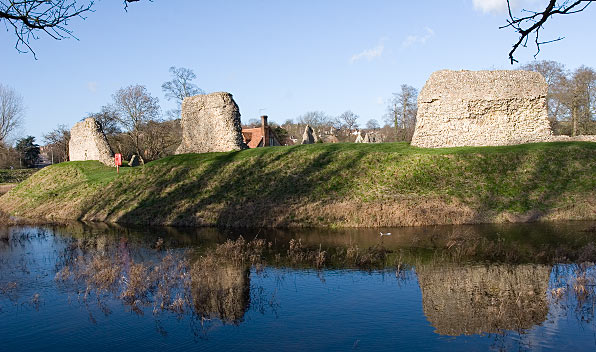
- Exterior walls, seen across the moat

Site information
- Type: Motte and bailey
- Owner: Duchy of Cornwall
- Operator: English Heritage
- Open to the public: Yes
- Condition: Ruined
- Website: English Heritage; Berkhamsted Castle Trust

Location
- Shown within Hertfordshire Berkhamsted Castle (England)
- Coordinates: 51°45′49″N 000°33′32″W
- Grid reference: SP996083

Site history
- Built: 1066
- Built by: Robert, Count of Mortain
- In use: 1066–1495
- Materials: Stone
- Battles/wars: 1216 Siege of Berkhamsted (First Barons' War)

Garrison information
- Past commanders: Edward the Black Prince
- Designations: Scheduled Ancient Monument

Berkhamsted Castle is a Norman motte-and-bailey castle in Berkhamsted, Hertfordshire. The castle was built to obtain control of a key route between London and the Midlands during the Norman conquest of England in the 11th century. Robert of Mortain, William the Conqueror's half brother, was probably responsible for managing its construction, after which he became the castle's owner. The castle was surrounded by protective earthworks and a deer park for hunting. The castle became a new administrative centre of the former Anglo-Saxon settlement of Berkhamsted. Subsequent kings granted the castle to their chancellors. The castle was substantially expanded in the mid-12th century, probably by Thomas Becket.

The castle was besieged in 1216 during the civil war between King John and rebellious barons, who were supported by France. It was captured by Prince Louis, the future Louis VIII, who attacked it with siege engines for twenty days, forcing the garrison to surrender. After being retaken by royal forces the subsequent year, it was given to Richard, Earl of Cornwall, beginning a long association with the Earldom of Cornwall and the later duchy. Richard redeveloped the castle as a palatial residence, and made it the centre of the earldom's administration. King Edward III further developed the castle in the 14th century and gave it to his son, Edward, the Black Prince, who expanded the hunting grounds. The castle was also used to hold royal prisoners, including King John II of France and rival claimants to the English throne.

In the late 15th century, the castle became unfashionable and fell into decline. By the mid-16th century, it was in ruins and unsuitable for royal use. Stone was taken from the castle to build houses and other buildings in the town. The castle was almost destroyed during the construction of the London and Birmingham Railway in the 1830s. As a result, it became the first building in Britain to receive statutory protection from Parliament. In 1930, the castle passed from the Duchy of Cornwall to the government's control. It is maintained as a tourist attraction by English Heritage.

== History ==
=== 1066–1217 ===
Berkhamsted Castle was built during the Norman Conquest of England in 1066. After William the Conqueror defeated the Anglo-Saxons at the Battle of Hastings he advanced from the coast, across the Thames Valley and north into Hertfordshire. Chroniclers suggest that the Archbishop of York surrendered to William in Berkhamsted, and William probably ordered the construction of the castle before proceeding south into London. Berkhamsted was strategically significant, as it lay on a key route into the Midlands from London through the Chiltern Hills. The actual construction work was probably overseen by William's half-brother, Robert of Mortain, who owned it by the time of the writing of the Domesday Book in 1086.

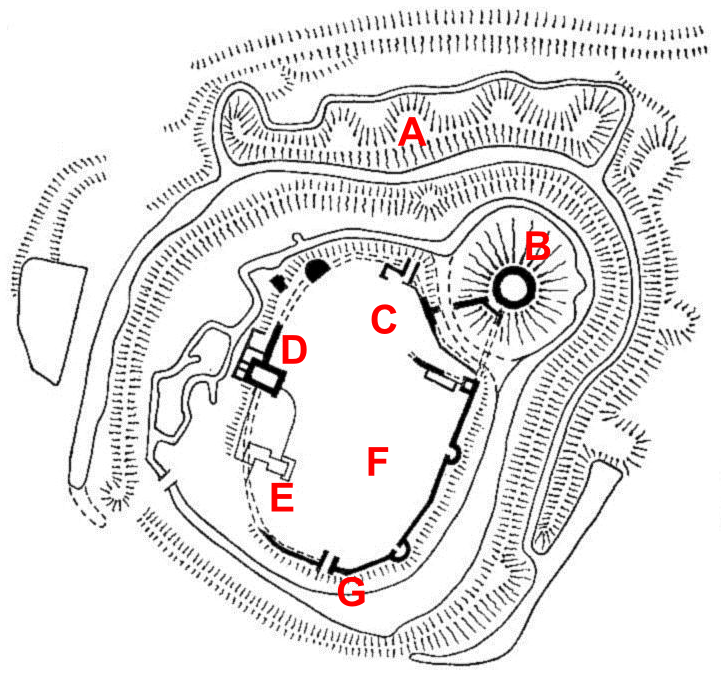
Plan of the castle: A – earthworks, possibly for French siege engines; B – motte and keep; C – inner bailey; D – Richard, Earl of Cornwall's tower; E – 19th century keeper's house; F – outer bailey; G – south gate

The castle was located slightly away from the main road, to give additional space for the earthworks involved, and was positioned as to benefit from natural springs running down from under the hill. It had a motte and bailey design, with a 40 foot (12 m) high motte, and a bailey around 500 foot (150 m) by 300 foot (91 m), enclosing 0.6 acres (0.24 ha) acres. A double bank and ditch ran around the whole castle, with both sets of ditches filled with water. In total, the wider earthworks occupy around 11 acres (4.5 ha). A fossarius – a specialised ditch digger – was recorded as being employed at the castle in 1086. Radiocarbon dating of organic remains from within the castle's motte indicates a post 1066 construction date.

A large deer park, owned by the Crown, was established around the castle to provide hunting grounds. The castle was carefully positioned next to the park, which was overlooked by the motte. A vineyard was also maintained alongside the castle. The old Anglo-Saxon manorial centre was moved to the site, and as a result the Anglo-Saxon settlement of Berkhamsted may have shifted from the area now called Northchurch along Akeman Street to be closer to the castle; several mills, essential for grinding flour, were present there in 1086.

Robert's son, William rebelled against Henry I and the castle was confiscated. Henry granted Berkhamsted to his chancellor, Ranulf. In 1123, however, when Ranulf was travelling to the castle with Henry, the chancellor rode over the nearby hill, became overly exhilarated at the view ahead of him and fell off his horse, dying from his injuries.

The castle was subsequently given by Henry II to Thomas Becket when he became chancellor in 1155. Becket extended the castle to accommodate his large household, but fell from favour in 1164 and the castle was confiscated by the king. Henry II liked Berkhamsted and subsequently used it himself extensively. By the mid-12th century, the castle had been rebuilt in stone, probably by Becket, with a shell keep and an outer stone wall; the bailey was divided in two by a wall to form an inner and an outer bailey. A gatehouse led down into the town, meeting with Castle Street. Henry II also officially recognised the surrounding settlement of Berkhamsted as a town in 1156.

Under King John the castle was part of the lands forming the jointure of his second wife Isabella. John entrusted the castle to Geoffrey Fitz Peter in 1206, who rebuilt much of the town. Geoffrey died in 1213 and the castle passed to his son, John Fitzgeoffrey.

Political tensions in England began to rise, however, and a potential conflict between King John and an alliance of rebel barons opposed to his rule began to look likely. In early 1215, King John installed a trusted German mercenary called Ranulph in charge of Berkhamsted Castle and reviewed the defensive arrangements there that April. Civil war broke out later that same year. Initially, the rebels were hampered by a lack of equipment – in particular, siege engines – but in May 1216 the future Louis VIII crossed over the English Channel joining the rebel cause and being proclaimed king in London, bringing with him heavy siege equipment.

King John died in October, and in December Louis besieged Berkhamsted Castle. The prince deployed his siege engines, probably trebuchets, and attacked the castle repeatedly for twenty days, throwing what chroniclers termed innumerable "damnable stones" at the defenders. During the 13th century, a set of earthworks was built around the outside of the walls, which may have been the firing platforms for these trebuchets. (Note: Academic opinions vary on the interpretation of the 13th century earthworks around the castle. Historian Nigel Pounds is certain on the basis of their unusual shape that they were the French firing platforms; Adrian Pettifer is uncertain; John Goodall suggests that they were instead defensive works built later by Richard, Earl of Cornwall, arguing that it would have been unlikely that the earthworks would have been left intact outside the castle after the war.) Having put up a strong defence, the garrison was allowed to surrender and to leave with their weapons and armour. When the forces loyal to the young Henry III defeated the rebels the following year, the castle was returned to royal hands.

=== 1218–1461 ===
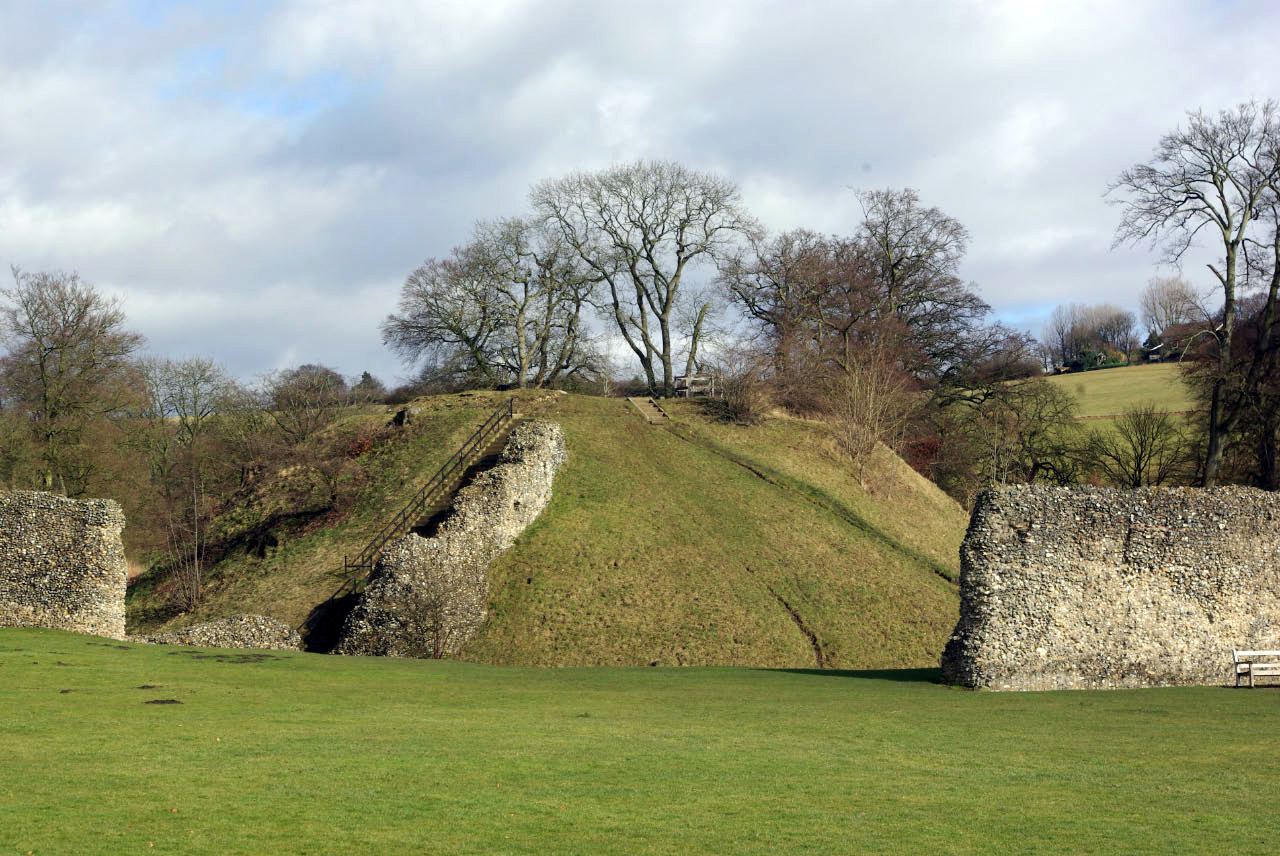
Berkamsted Castle motte, with a modern staircase

In subsequent years, Berkhamsted then became closely associated with the Earls and Dukes of Cornwall. Henry III's brother, Richard, became the Earl of Cornwall and inherited the castle from his mother Isabella, and it became a permanent part of the earldom. Berkhamsted was Richard's favourite castle, partially because it was conveniently close to London. Richard had an impressive, three-storey tower built onto the property in 1254, and restored much of the rest of the castle; the chroniclers of nearby Dunstable complained that his building works required so many carts to carry the timber that local trade in other goods was badly affected. The castle was used for the central administration of the earldom and Richard's nine stewards would submit their annual financial reports there. Meanwhile, the town of Berkhamsted itself became rich as a result of the growing wool trade. Richard died at the castle in 1272, and it passed to his son Edmund.

The castle passed on through Edward I, who found the castle in an apparently poor condition, and his second wife, Margaret, to Edward II. Edward II gave it to his royal favourite, Piers Gaveston, whom he made Earl of Cornwall. Gaveston was married there in 1307, with Edward in attendance. Edward II and Gaveston fell from power in 1327 and John, Edward's second son, took possession as the new Earl of Cornwall.

When John died, Edward III reclaimed Berkhamsted Castle; a survey showed it to be in need of substantial repairs. Edward had not yet improved Windsor Castle, so used Berkhamsted as his main property, investing considerable sums in renovating it. His son, Edward, the Black Prince, was created Duke of Cornwall and also made extensive use of the castle, which formed part of the new duchy. The Black Prince took advantage of the aftermath of the Black Death to extend the castle's park by 65 acres (26 ha), including some woodland pasture stretching over the Chilterns, eventually producing a park covering 991 acres (401 ha). The castle was used to hold John II of France after he was taken prisoner at the Battle of Poitiers. When the Black Prince fell ill following his campaigning in France, he retired to Berkhamsted and died there in 1376.

Richard II inherited Berkhamsted Castle in 1377; initially the use of it was given to his favourite, Robert de Vere and, after de Vere's fall from power and exile in 1388, to John Holland. Henry IV lived in the castle after he deposed Richard in 1400, and he used the property to detain rival applicants to the throne. During this period Geoffrey Chaucer, later famous for his Canterbury Tales, oversaw renovation work on the castle in his role as a clerk. Both Henry V and Henry VI owned the castle, the latter making use of it until his overthrow in 1461.

=== 1462–1900 ===
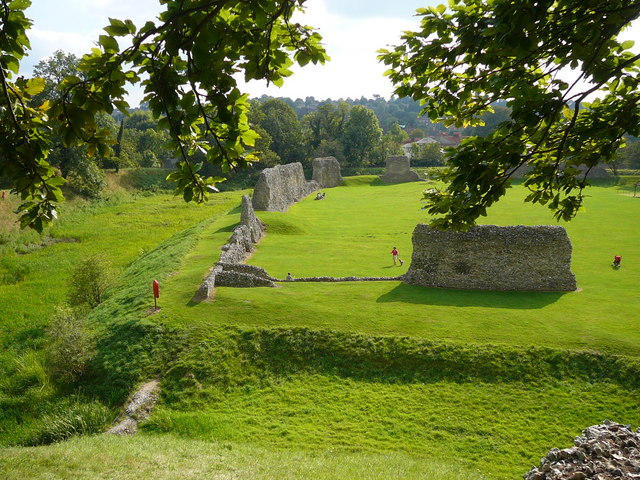
View from the motte, looking into the inner bailey

Berkhamsted was confiscated by Edward IV when he came to power during Wars of the Roses. In the late 15th century, the castle was occupied by his mother, Cecily Neville, the Duchess of York. By now the castle had become increasingly unfashionable, however, and was abandoned after her death in 1495. By the time that antiquarian John Leland visited in the mid-16th century, it was in "much ruine" and was unsuitable for royal use.

In 1580, the estate, including the ruins and the park, was leased by Elizabeth I to Sir Edward Carey, for the nominal rent of one red rose each year. Stone from the castle was used to build Berkhamsted Place, a local school and other buildings in the late 16th century. The castle's park, which had reached 1,252 acres (507 ha) in size by 1627, was broken up in the next two decades, shrinking to only 376 acres (152 ha). The English Civil War of the 1640s largely passed Berkhamsted by, with the castle apparently playing no part in the conflict.

In 1761 the wider estate and the castle were separated, the former being leased to the Duke of Bridgewater, while the latter remained in the direct control of the Duchy of Cornwall. In 1863, the surrounding estates and park were sold off altogether by the duchy to Earl Brownlow; Brownlow also agreed to rent the castle from the duchy for a nominal rent.

In the 1830s, plans were drawn up to build the new London and Birmingham Railway. From an engineering perspective, the ideal route for the railway ran through the site of the castle, but concerns over the need to protect ancient monuments and buildings had been growing for several years, and the local Bridgwater estate were also keen to protect the local view from their buildings. The castle was ultimately specifically protected in the 1833 act that sanctioned the railway, forcing the track to take a route across the valley floor. Berkhamsted was the first building in Britain to receive statutory protection from development in this way. Nonetheless, the route selected still passed through the outer fortifications of the castle, with the outer moat partially infilled and the gatehouse demolished in 1834.

Between around 1841 and 1897 a soup kitchen operated within the castle ruins. It was set up as a charity by Charlotte Catherine Anne, Countess of Bridgewater to feed destitute agricultural workers during the winter months. Contemporary accounts in the Bucks Herald describe the distribution of soup and bread to hundreds of poor people from a house in the castle grounds, thought to be the 19th-century keeper's house which stands in the outer ward.

=== 20th – 21st centuries ===
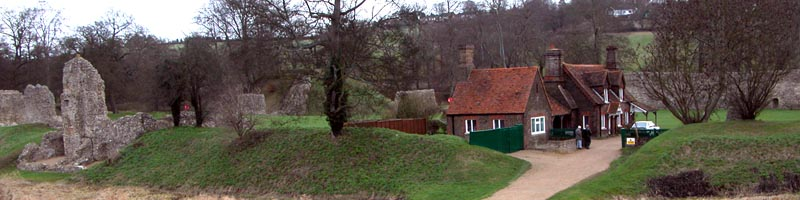
Ruins of the external walls, keeper's house, castle motte in background

In 1924, a strip of land around the periphery of the castle ruins was purchased from Lord Brownlow's estate by William Cooper and Nephews, a local agricultural chemical factory, for use as grazing land for sheep.

Following the Ancient Monuments Consolidation and Amendment Act 1913, the British Government was empowered to issue preservation orders to protect ancient monuments. The Office of Works acquired control of Berkhamsted Castle from the Duchy of Cornwall on 24 December 1929. Renovation works were carried out on the castle ruins 1930–31, using a workforce made up of men who had become unemployed during the Great Depression. Overgrown trees were felled and the moats cleared. During the clearance work, the stave of a 13th-century crossbow was dug up in the eastern part of the inner moat. The crossbow is thought to be a remnant of the siege of 1216. In 1976, it was put on display in the Royal Armouries collection at the Tower of London until the display closed in 1995, and the crossbow is now held in the British Museum collection in London. The inner ditch was subsequently drained of water in the 1950s.

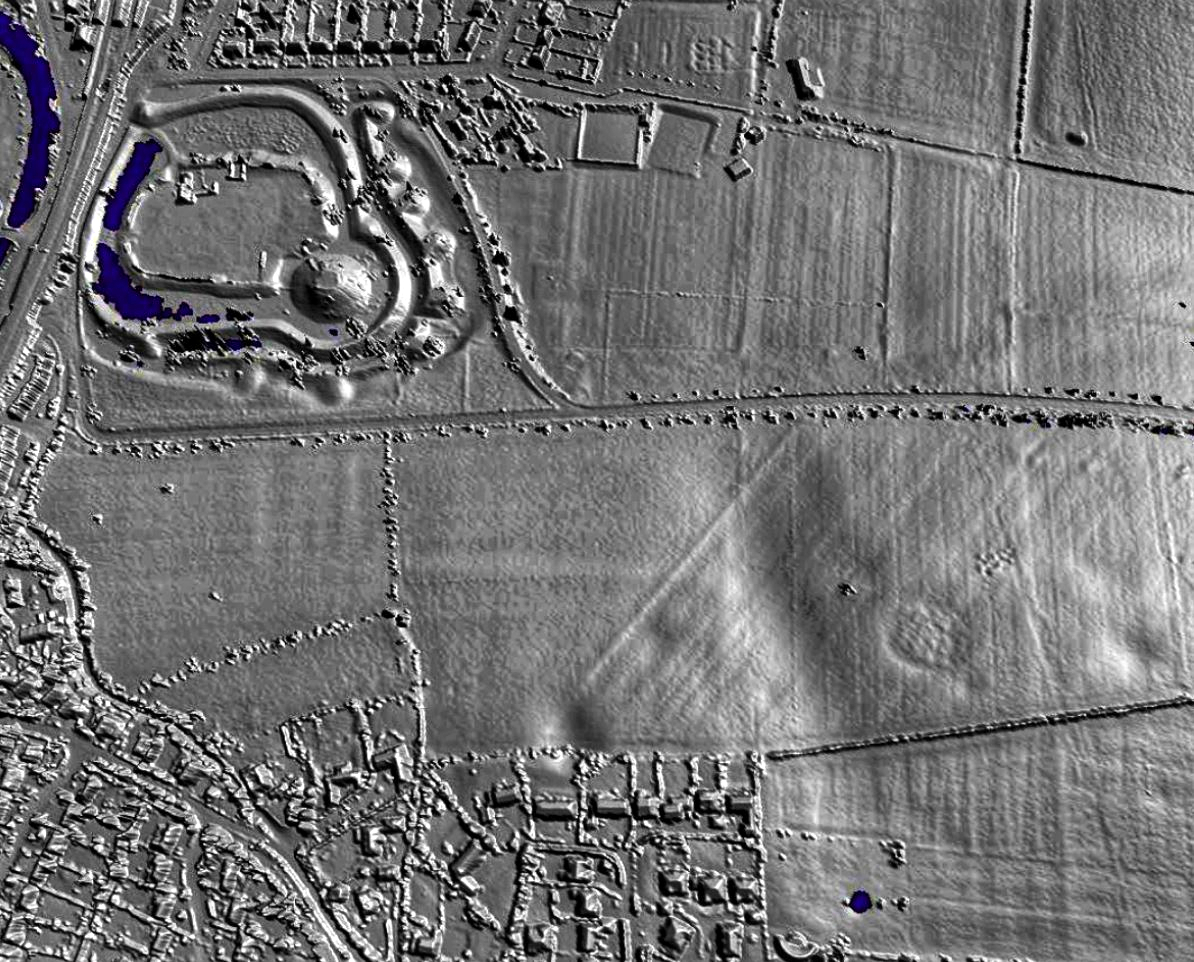
A lidar view across to Berkhamsted Castle

On 13 June 1935, Edward, Prince of Wales visited Berkhamsted Castle during a tour of the town. He was the first Duke of Cornwall to come to Berkhamsted since a visit in 1616 by Prince Charles (the future King Charles I). Following the outbreak of World War II, Berkhamsted Castle was used as a secret location to house a collection of public statues that had been removed from central London to protect them from bomb damage during the Blitz. The statues included The Burghers of Calais by Auguste Rodin and sculptures of King George III by Matthew Cotes Wyatt, King William III by John Bacon and Viscount Wolseley by William Goscombe John.

In the summer of 1966, to mark the 900th anniversary of the Norman Conquest, a festive pageant was held in the castle grounds. The eight-day event featured a dramatic presentation of the history of Berkhamsted and attracted large numbers of spectators. A planned event to mark the 950th anniversary in 2016 was cancelled when English Heritage refused permission due to concerns about damage to castle fabric and health and safety.

Today, Berkhamsted Castle is protected by law as an ancient monument. The ruins are operated as a tourist attraction by English Heritage, who inherited the guardianship from the former Ministry of Works. Ownership of the land is still held by the Duchy of Cornwall, with two peripheral sections formerly held by Coopers Works now divided between the Secretary of State for Digital, Culture, Media and Sport and the Berkhamsted Castle Trust.

Historian Isobel Thompson considers Berkhamsted Castle to be "one of the best surviving motte and bailey castles" in England. Sam Willis has recalled visiting the castle as a child and remembers especially running up and down the motte.

The Berkhamsted Castle site entirely staffed by local volunteers. It is open daily and visitors can enter free of charge.

== Castle Occupants ==
In the 11th century, Robert of Mortain was associated with Berkhamsted Castle. Then in 1086, Randulph, Lord Chancellor, received permission from the Crown to construct another wooden fort on the castle site. In 1155, Thomas à Becket took over the castle as Lord Chancellor and converted the wooden fort into a stone fortress. Between 1191 and King Richard I's death, Queen Berengaria of Navarre occupied the castle. Queen Isabella of Angoulême also occupied the castle until the siege in 1204. King Henry III granted the castle to Richard Earl of Cornwall in 1227, who then used it as his primary residence and administrative centre. Queen Margaret of France occupied the Berkhamsted Castle in 1291. Edward, the Black Prince, took over the castle in 1337 and later imprisoned King John II there in 1356. In 1399, King Henry IV granted the castle to his son Henry V who passed the castle on to Margaret of Anjou. Finally, between 1469 and her death in 1495, Cecily Neville, Duchess of York, occupied the castle.

== Castle Construction ==
The Berkhamsted motte mound is around 14 m high (45.9 feet) and 55 metres (180.4 feet) in diameter and comprises a motte in the northeast corner of an oblong bailey. The motte stands on a shell keep of about 18 metres wide (59 feet), and the bailey occupies around 1.3 hectares (13,000 sq m).

The original castle was rebuilt in stone and extended over many years, yet the position remains consistent with the initial build. The castle boasted two complete moats in its prime, and visitors approached the castle from today's Castle Street. They entered through a low wooden bridge across the River Bulbourne and a second drawbridge led to the central Gateway.

== See also ==
- Castles in Great Britain and Ireland
- List of castles in England
