= Richard of Cornwall =

King of Germany from 1257 to 1272

Richard
- Earl of Cornwall
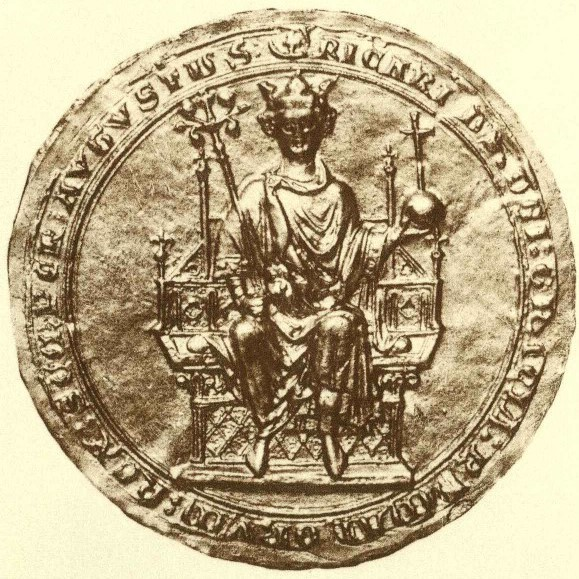
- Seal of King Richard

King of Germany (formally King of the Romans)
- Reign: 13 January 1257 – 2 April 1272
- Coronation: 17 May 1257
- Predecessor: William II of Holland
- Successor: Rudolf I of Habsburg
- Born: 5 January 1209; Winchester Castle, Hampshire, England
- Died: 2 April 1272 (aged 63); Berkhamsted Castle, Hertfordshire, England
- Burial: Hailes Abbey, Gloucestershire
- Spouses: Isabel Marshal (m. 1231; died 1240) Sanchia of Provence (m. 1243; died 1261) Beatrice of Falkenburg (m. 1269)
- Issue more...: Henry; Edmund, 2nd Earl of Cornwall
- House: Plantagenet
- Father: John, King of England
- Mother: Isabella, Countess of Angoulême

Richard (5 January 1209 – 2 April 1272) was an English prince who was King of the Romans from 1257 until his death in 1272. He was the second son of John, King of England, and Isabella, Countess of Angoulême. Richard was nominal Count of Poitou from 1225 to 1243, and he also held the title Earl of Cornwall from 1225. He was one of the wealthiest men in Europe and joined the Barons' Crusade, where he achieved success as a negotiator for the release of prisoners and assisted with the building of the citadel in Ascalon.

== Biography ==
=== Early life ===
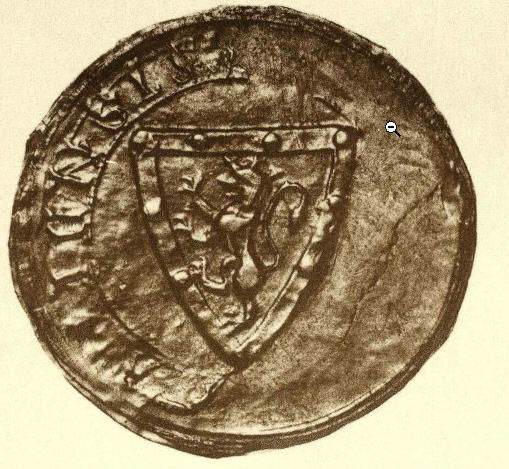
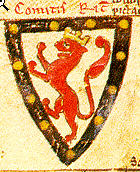
Left: Seal (verso side) of Richard of Cornwall, showing his arms; right his arms: Argent, a lion rampant gules crowned or a bordure sable bezantée as drawn by his contemporary Matthew Paris (d. 1259)

He was born 5 January 1209 at Winchester Castle, the second son of John, King of England, and Isabella, Countess of Angoulême. He was made High Sheriff of Berkshire at age eight, was styled Count of Poitou from 1225 and in the same year, at the age of sixteen, his brother King Henry III gave him Cornwall as a birthday present, making him High Sheriff of Cornwall. Richard's revenues from Cornwall helped make him one of the wealthiest men in Europe. Though he campaigned on King Henry's behalf in Poitou and Brittany, and served as regent three times, relations were often strained between the brothers in the early years of Henry's reign, once Henry took rule for himself. Richard rebelled against him three times and had to be bought off with lavish gifts.

In 1225, Richard traded with Gervase de Tintagel, swapping the land of Merthen (originally part of the manor of Winnianton) for Tintagel Castle. It has been suggested that a castle was built on the site by Richard in 1233 to establish a connection with the Arthurian legends that were associated by Geoffrey of Monmouth with the area. Richard hoped that, in this way, he could gain the Cornish people's trust.

The dating to the period of Richard has superseded Ralegh Radford's interpretation which attributed the earliest elements of the castle to Earl Reginald de Dunstanville and later elements to Earl Richard. Sidney Toy, however, has suggested an earlier period of construction for the castle.

=== Marriage to Isabel, 1231–1240 ===
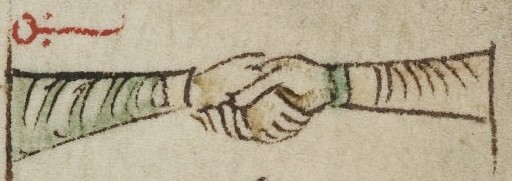
Richard of Cornwall married Isabella of Gloucester, forging a notable dynastic alliance.

In March 1231, he married Isabel Marshal, the wealthy widow of the Earl of Gloucester, much to the displeasure of his brother King Henry, who feared the Marshal family because they were rich, influential, and often opposed him, as did Richard by this point. The joining of Richard to the Marshal family increased the power behind these rebellions, and the potential risk for Henry. Richard became stepfather to Isabel's six children from her first husband. In that same year he acquired his main residence, Wallingford Castle in Berkshire (now Oxfordshire), and spent much money on developing it. He had other favoured properties at Marlow and Cippenham and was a notable lord of the manor at Earls Risborough, all in Buckinghamshire.

Isabel and Richard had four children, of whom only their son, Henry of Almain, survived to adulthood. Richard opposed Simon de Montfort and rose in rebellion in 1238 to protest against the marriage of his sister, Eleanor, to Simon. Once again he was placated with rich gifts. When Isabel was on her deathbed in 1240, she asked to be buried next to her first husband at Tewkesbury, but Richard had her interred at Beaulieu Abbey instead. As a pious gesture, however, he sent her heart to Tewkesbury.

=== On Crusade and marriage to Sanchia, 1240–1243 ===
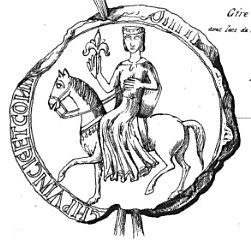
Seal of Sanchia, Queen of the Romans, Richard's wife

Later that year, Richard departed for the Holy Land, leading the second host of crusaders to arrive during the Barons' Crusade. He did not fight any battles but managed to negotiate for the release of prisoners (most notably Amaury de Montfort) and the burials of crusaders killed at a battle in Gaza in November 1239. He also refortified Ascalon, which had been demolished by Saladin. On his return from the Holy Land, Richard visited his sister Isabella, the empress of Frederick II.

After the birth of Prince Edward in 1239, provisions were made in case of the king's death, which favoured the Queen and her Savoyard relatives and excluded Richard. To keep him from becoming discontented King Henry and Queen Eleanor brought up the idea of a marriage with Eleanor's sister Sanchia shortly after his return on 28 January 1242. On his journey to the Holy Land, Richard had met Sanchia in Provence, where he was warmly welcomed by her father Raymond Berenger IV. Richard and Sanchia were married at Westminster in November 1243. Marriage to Sanchia had the advantage of tying Richard closely to the royal couple and their interests.

Eleanor and Sanchia's youngest sister Beatrice married Charles I of Naples, while their oldest sister Margaret had married Louis IX of France. The marriages of the kings of France and England and their two brothers to the four sisters from Provence improved the relationship between the two countries that led to the Treaty of Paris in 1259.

=== Poitou and Sicily ===
Richard was appointed count of Poitou some time before August 1225. However, Richard's claims to Gascony and Poitou were never more than nominal, and in 1241, King Louis IX of France invested his own brother Alphonse with Poitou. Moreover, Richard and Henry's mother, Isabella of Angoulême, claimed to have been insulted by the French queen. They were encouraged to recover Poitou by their stepfather, Hugh X of Lusignan, but the expedition turned into a military fiasco after Lusignan betrayed them. Richard conceded Poitou around December 1243.

Pope Innocent IV offered Richard the crown of Sicily, but according to Matthew Paris, he responded to the extortionate price by saying, "You might as well say, 'I will sell or give you the moon, rise up and take it'". Instead, his brother King Henry attempted to purchase the kingdom for his own son Edmund.

=== Elected King of Germany, 1257 ===
Richard was elected King of Germany in the 1257 imperial election by four of the seven German Electoral Princes:

- Konrad von Hochstaden, the Archbishop of Cologne;
- Gerhard I von Dhaun, Archbishop of Mainz;
- Louis II, the Count Palatine;
- Ottokar II, King of Bohemia.

His candidacy was opposed by Alfonso X of Castile, who was supported by three electors:

- Albert I, Duke of Saxony;
- John I, Margrave of Brandenburg;
- Arnold II of Isenburg, Archbishop of Trier.

Pope Alexander IV and King Louis IX of France favoured Alfonso, but both were ultimately convinced by the powerful relatives of Richard's wife Sanchia, and his sister-in-law, Eleanor of Provence, to support Richard. Ottokar II of Bohemia, who at first voted for Richard but later elected Alfonso, eventually agreed to support the Earl of Cornwall, thus establishing the required simple majority. So Richard had to bribe only four of them, but this came at a huge cost of 28,000 marks. On 17 May 1257, Konrad von Hochstaden, Archbishop of Cologne, himself crowned Richard King of the Romans in Aachen; however, like his lordships in Gascony and Poitou, his title never held much significance, and he made only four brief visits to Germany between 1257 and 1269.

=== Later life, death and successors ===
He founded Burnham Abbey in Buckinghamshire in 1263, and the Grashaus, Aachen in 1266.

He joined King Henry in fighting against Simon de Montfort's rebels in the Second Barons' War (1264–1267). After the shattering royalist defeat at the Battle of Lewes, Richard took refuge in a windmill, was discovered, and was imprisoned until September 1265.

Richard bought the feudal barony of Trematon in 1270.

In March 1271 Richard's son and heir Henry of Almain was murdered in Viterbo at the Church of San Silvestro by Guy and Simon de Montfort the Younger in revenge for their father and brother Henry de Montfort being killed at the Battle of Evesham. Simon and Guy were Richard's nephews and sources say that Richard did not recover from the shock. In December 1271, he had a stroke. His right side was paralysed and he lost the ability to speak. On 2 April 1272, Richard died at Berkhamsted Castle in Hertfordshire. He was buried next to his second wife Sanchia of Provence and Henry of Almain, his son by his first wife, at Hailes Abbey, which he had founded.

After his death, a power struggle ensued in Germany, which only ended in 1273 with the emergence of Rudolph I of Habsburg, the first scion of a long-lasting noble family to rule the empire. In Cornwall, Richard was succeeded by Edmund, son of his second wife Sanchia.

== Wives and progeny ==
Richard of Cornwall married three times and had six legitimate children, none of whom themselves had children, and he also had illegitimate progeny:

=== First wife ===
Richard married first, on 30 March 1231 at Fawley, Buckinghamshire, to Isabel Marshal (d. 1240) was the daughter of William Marshal, 1st Earl of Pembroke, by his wife Isabel de Clare, who in turn was daughter of Sir Richard "Strongbow" de Clare and Aoife MacMurrough. Isabel Marshal died on 17 January 1240 while giving birth at Berkhamsted Castle and was buried at Beaulieu Abbey. By Isabel Marshal he had four children, of whom only one reached adulthood:

- John of Cornwall (31 January 1232 – 22 September 1232), born and died at Marlow, Buckinghamshire, buried at Reading Abbey.
- Isabel of Cornwall (c. 9 September 1233 – 6 October 1234), born and died at Marlow, Buckinghamshire, buried at Reading Abbey.
- Henry of Cornwall (2 November 1235 – 13 March 1271). Known as "Henry of Almain" (Germany). He was buried at Hailes Abbey in Gloucestershire. He had no children.
- Nicholas of Cornwall (b. & d. 17 January 1240 at Berkhamsted Castle), died shortly after birth; buried at Beaulieu Abbey with his mother.

=== Second wife ===
Richard's second marriage took place nearly four years after the death of his first wife. His new bride, whom he married in Westminster Abbey on 23 November 1243, was Sanchia of Provence (c. 1225 – 9 November 1261), the third of four daughters of Ramon Berenguer IV, Count of Provence, by his wife Beatrice of Savoy. She was a younger sister of the Queens of France and England, while the youngest sister would later become Queen of Sicily. The match was arranged by Sanchia's elder sister Eleanor of Provence, wife of Richard's elder brother King Henry III of England. Sanchia died on 9 November 1261 at Berkhamsted Castle and was buried 15 November in Hailes Abbey in Gloucestershire. By Sanchia of Provence, Richard had a further two sons:

- unnamed son (Jul 1246 – 15 Aug 1246), died in infancy.
- Edmund, 2nd Earl of Cornwall (26 December 1249 – before 25 September 1300), usually styled Edmund of Almain. Edmund married Margaret de Clare (1250 – shortly before November 1312), daughter of Richard de Clare, Earl of Gloucester, but by her had no children.

=== Third wife ===
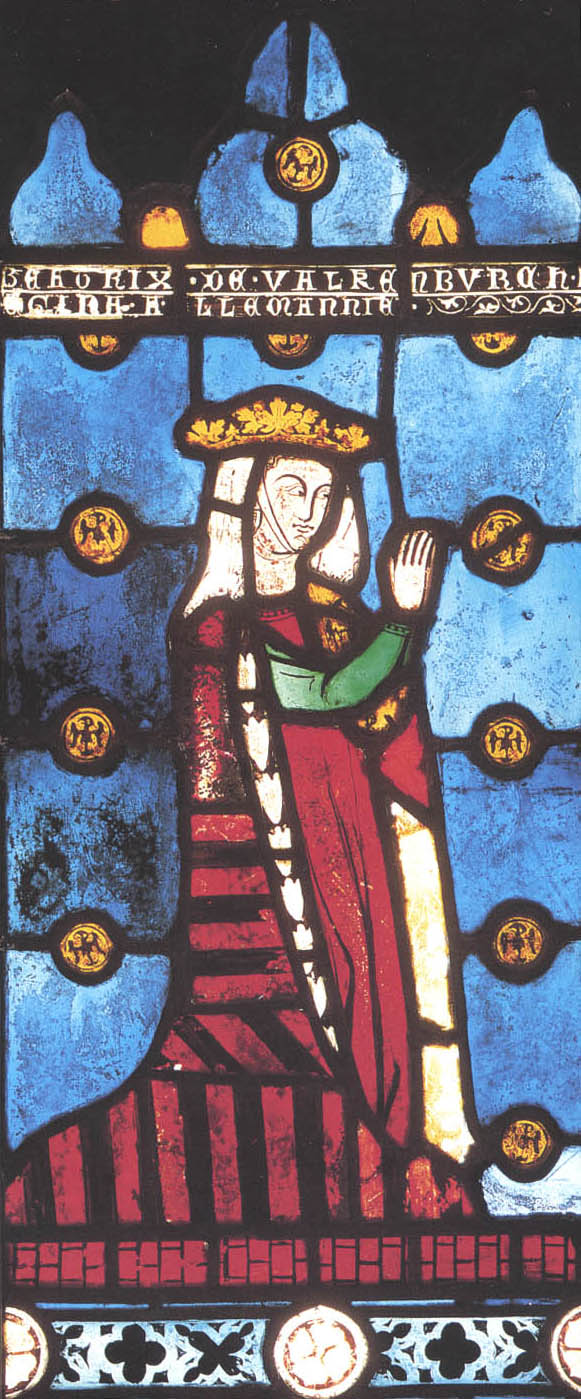
Beatrice of Falkenburg, Richard's third wife, shown as Queen of the Romans in a 13th-century depiction

The third marriage of Richard was to Beatrice of Falkenburg, said to be one of the most beautiful women of her time. Her father, Dietrich I, Count of Falkenburg, of Valkenburg Castle in the Netherlands, was a supporter of Richard's claim to the throne of the Holy Roman Empire. The two men fought on the same side in a battle, at which time Richard met Beatrice and grew besotted by her. They married on 16 June 1269 at Kaiserslautern, when she was about fifteen years old while he was in his sixty-first year and his youngest child was only four years older than Beatrice. Richard doted on his young wife, and she had a high regard for him, but they produced no children. Beatrice survived Richard by only five years and never married again. She died on 17 October 1277 and was buried before the high altar at the Church of the Grey Friars in Oxford.

=== Illegitimate children ===
Richard had several documented out-of-wedlock children. One of Richard's mistresses was Joan de Vautort, widow of Ralph de Vautort (d. 1267), feudal baron of Harberton, Devon and Trematon, Cornwall. Joan later married Sir Alexander Okeston, lord of the manor of Modbury in Devon, a part of the Vautorts' feudal barony of Harberton that had been granted him by Roger de Vautort. Joan bore Alexander a son and heir, Sir James Okeston.

By Joan de Vautort or other mistresses, the Earl of Cornwall had at least three sons and a daughter as follows:

- Philip of Cornwall, a priest.
- Sir Richard of Cornwall, who received a grant from his half-brother Edmund, 2nd Earl of Cornwall (d. 1300), in which he was called "brother". He married Joan, allegedly daughter of John Fitzalan III, and by her had three sons and a daughter. He was slain by an arrow at the Siege of Berwick in 1296. His daughter Joan of Cornwall married Sir John Howard, from whom the Howard family, Dukes of Norfolk, are descended.
- Sir Walter of Cornwall, who received a grant of the royal manor of Brannel, Cornwall; from his half-brother Edmund, 2nd Earl of Cornwall, in which he was called "brother". He was ancestor of the Cornwalls of Branell.
- Joan of Cornwall, daughter of Joan de Vautort, in 1283 received a grant from her half-brother Edmund, 2nd Earl of Cornwall, in which she was called "sister". The younger Joan married (1st) Richard de Champernoun and (2nd) Sir Peter de Fishacre of Combe Fishacre and Coleton Fishacre, Devon, having no issue by the second. Her childless half-brother Sir James Okeston made her son (or grandson) Richard de Champernoun his heir.

== Notes ==
Richard of Cornwall House of Plantagenet Born: 5 January 1209 Died: 2 April 1272
Regnal titles
Preceded by William	King of Germany; 13 January 1257 – 2 April 1272 with Alfonso as contender	Succeeded by Rudolf I
Peerage of England
New title	Earl of Cornwall; 1225–1272	Succeeded by Edmund
