= Battle of Frankfurt (1246) =

- Part of the Crusade against the Staufer
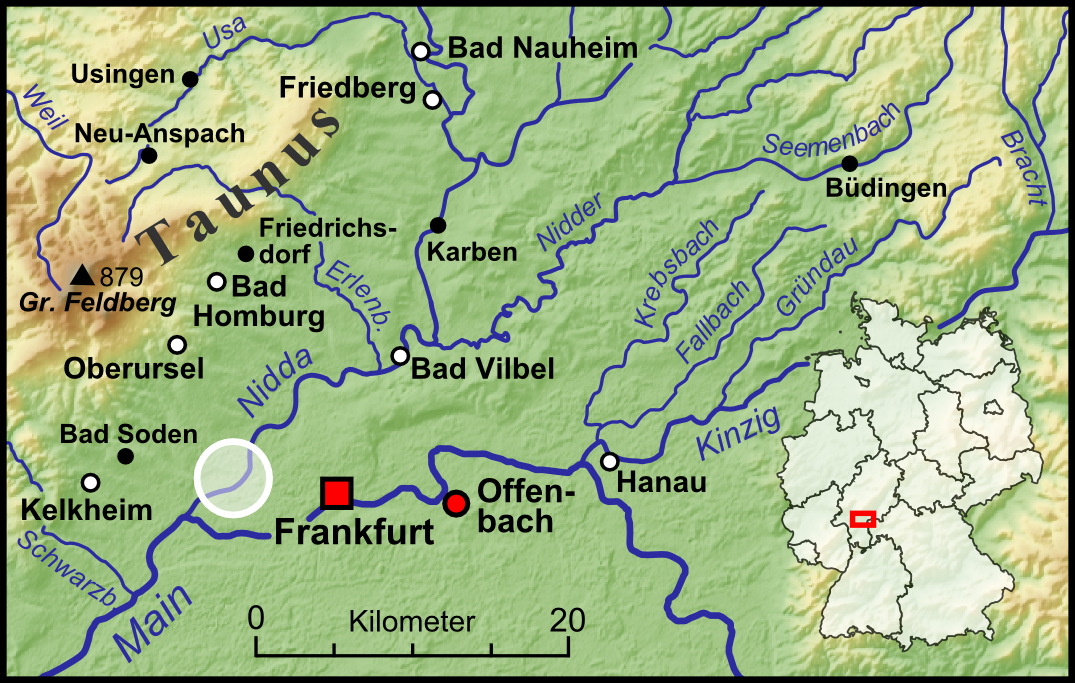
- Possible location of the battle (circle)
Date	5 August 1246
Location	Near Frankfurt am Main
Result	Papalist–Crusader victory

Belligerents
Henry Raspe, king backed by the pope	Conrad IV, king backed by the emperor

Strength
	3,000

The battle of Frankfurt or the battle on the Nidda of 5 August 1246 was fought between two rival German kings, Henry Raspe, who had the support of Pope Innocent IV, and Conrad IV, the son of Emperor Frederick II. Henry was victorious.

== Date and location ==
The battle took place between the rivers Nidda and Main, but its exact location is uncertain. It may have taken place on the southern bank of the Nidda to the north or west of Frankfurt, where the river was shallow and easily crossed. It may have taken place on the northern bank of the Main, where warships could operate more effectively. According to the Annals of Worms, the battle took place on Saint Oswald's day.

== Armies ==
The composition of Henry's army is not known in detail nor the contribution made to it by soldiers who had taken crusade vows. Since the pope had declared a crusade against Conrad IV, the leading churchmen of Germany took Henry's side. At Mainz on 25 July, Henry joined his forces with those of Archbishop Siegfried III of Mainz, Archbishop Conrad of Cologne and Bishop Henry III of Strasbourg. The combined army marched to Frankfurt that same day. From Frankfurt the papal legate, Philip of Ferrara, summoned Archbishop Arnold II of Trier.

According to Walter of Ocra, an eyewitness, Conrad's army numbered some 3,000 knights, infantry, archers and crossbowmen, with two thirds of these contributed by the Swabian counts and the other third drawn from Conrad's own retinue, two thirds of which he held back. Abbot Berchtold of Saint Gall brought horses and soldiers. The city of Worms sent soldiers and warships at a cost of 150 Cologne marks (or 24,000 pennies). The chronicler Matthew Paris blames the emperor for leaving his son with insufficient forces.

Bishop Landolf von Hoheneck, although sympathetic to Conrad, did not involve himself in the conflict. Nevertheless, he was fined 100 marks by his superior, Archbishop Siegfried, for not intervening on Henry's side.

The major German princes did not take part in the battle.

== Battle ==
The archbishops of Mainz and Cologne were present at the battle, according to the Royal Chronicle of Cologne. The presence of the archbishop of Trier is less certain, since he had not joined the army at Mainz. He is mentioned as present in the Gesta Treverorum. His own biography, Gesta Arnoldi, describing him leading a charge.

The battle was short. At the start of the battle, Counts Ulrich I of Württemberg and Hartmann II of Grüningen, bribed by papal money, abandoned Conrad and crossed over to Henry's side with 200 knights plus archers. Henry's subsequent attack forced Conrad to retreat across a bridge. Frankfurt opened its gates and his army took shelter inside.

The battle of Frankfurt was "the defining military victory of Henry Raspe's kingship" and "the only [pitched] battle during the crusade against the Staufer in Germany." It was indecisive, as it left Conrad's military power largely intact, but "a watershed moment because it showed that victory over the Staufer was possible."

== Aftermath ==
Henry held a Hoftag (court day) outside the city on 13 August. The archbishop of Trier was absent. Henry declared Conrad deposed from the duchy of Swabia and all his properties in Germany confiscated. This decision drew little attention at the time since Henry as unable to enforce it.

The next stage of Henry's campaign was an invasion of Swabia. This was made possible because of the betrayal of more of the Swabian nobility. The Annales Argentinenses, written from the nobles' perspective, accuses Conrad of misdirecting his anger at the loyal counts and so alienating them.

== Works cited ==
- Bachrach, David S., ed. (2014). The Histories of a Medieval German City, Worms c. 1000–c. 1300: Translation and Commentary. Ashgate.
- Hufschmid, Michelle T. (2020). The Crusade Against the Staufer in Germany, 1246–51 (PhD dissertation). University of Oxford.
- Van Cleve, Thomas C. (1972). The Emperor Frederick II of Hohenstaufen: Immutator Mundi. Clarendon Press.
