= Willem Zwalve =

Dutch legal historian (born 1949)

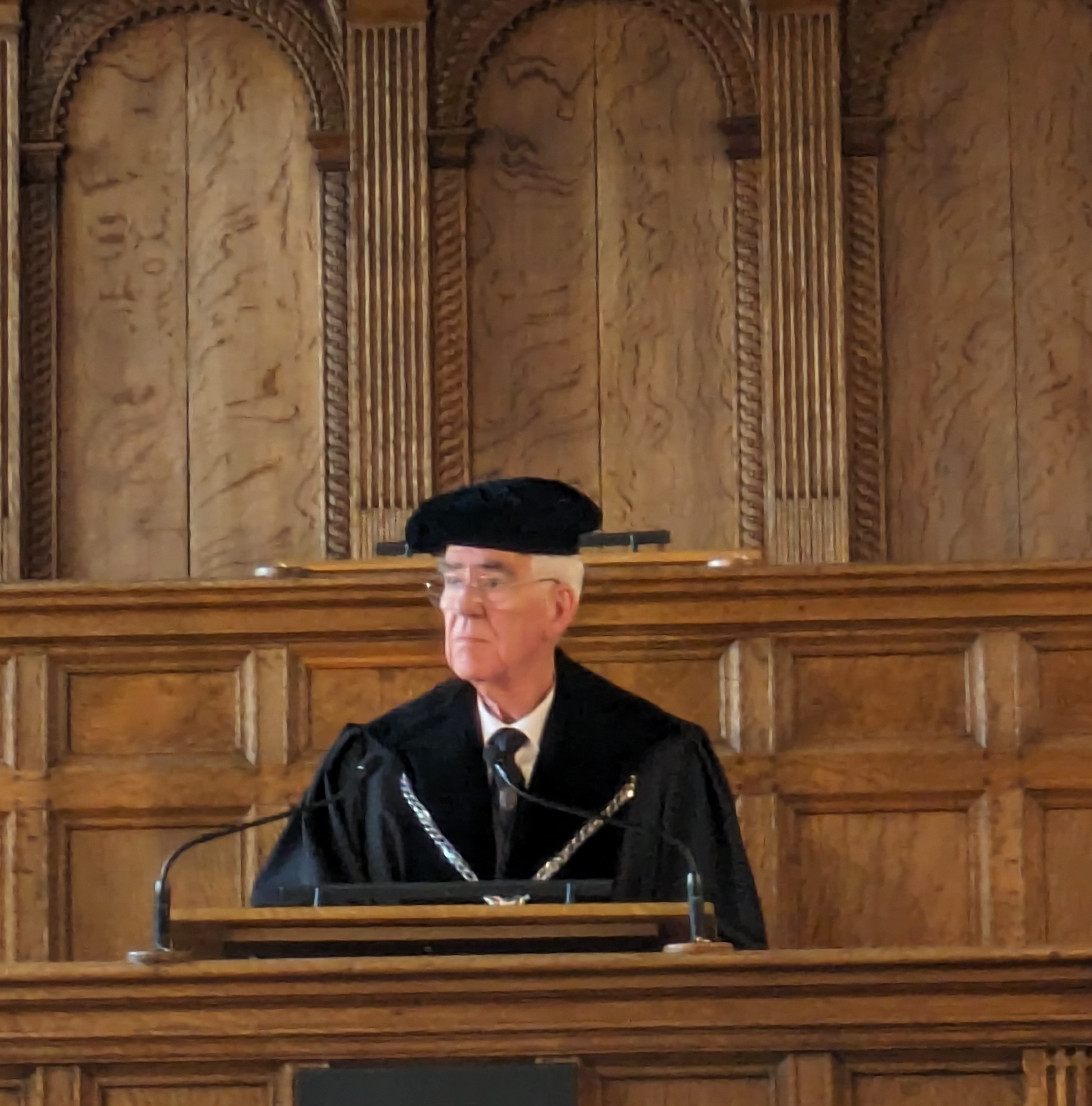
- Zwalve presiding as pro-rector magnificus over a PhD defence in Leiden University's Academy Building.
- Born: September 7, 1949 (age 75); Groningen, Netherlands
- Education: University of Groningen
- Occupation: Professor emiritus - Legal History

Willem Jans Zwalve (born 7 September 1949) is a Dutch legal historian. He was a professor at the University of Groningen from 1987 until 1993 and subsequently at Leiden University from 1993 until 2014.

== Life ==
Zwalve was born 7 September 1949 in Groningen. In his youth he had an interest in studying ancient languages or history, but his father stated: "I don't want to subsidize hobbies". Zwalve thus started studying law in 1968. While working as a scientific employee Zwalve became inspired by watching Herman Jan Scheltema and others work on a translation of the Corpus Juris Civilis. Zwalve obtained his PhD at the University of Groningen in 1981 with a thesis titled: "Proeve ener theorie der denegatio actionis : een onderzoek naar de positie van de magistraat in het Romeinse burgerlijke procesrecht", a work on Roman civil procedure. Zwalve was a professor of law and comparative law at the University of Groningen from 1987 until 1993. He was professor of legal history at Leiden University from 1993 until 2014.

Zwalve was elected a member of the Royal Netherlands Academy of Arts and Sciences in 2009. German jurist Reinhard Zimmermann has described Zwalve's "Hoofdstukken uit de geschiedenis van het Europese privaatrecht" as a pioneering historical and comparative study.
