= Sant'Eusanio Forconese =

- Comune
- Comune di Sant'Eusanio Forconese
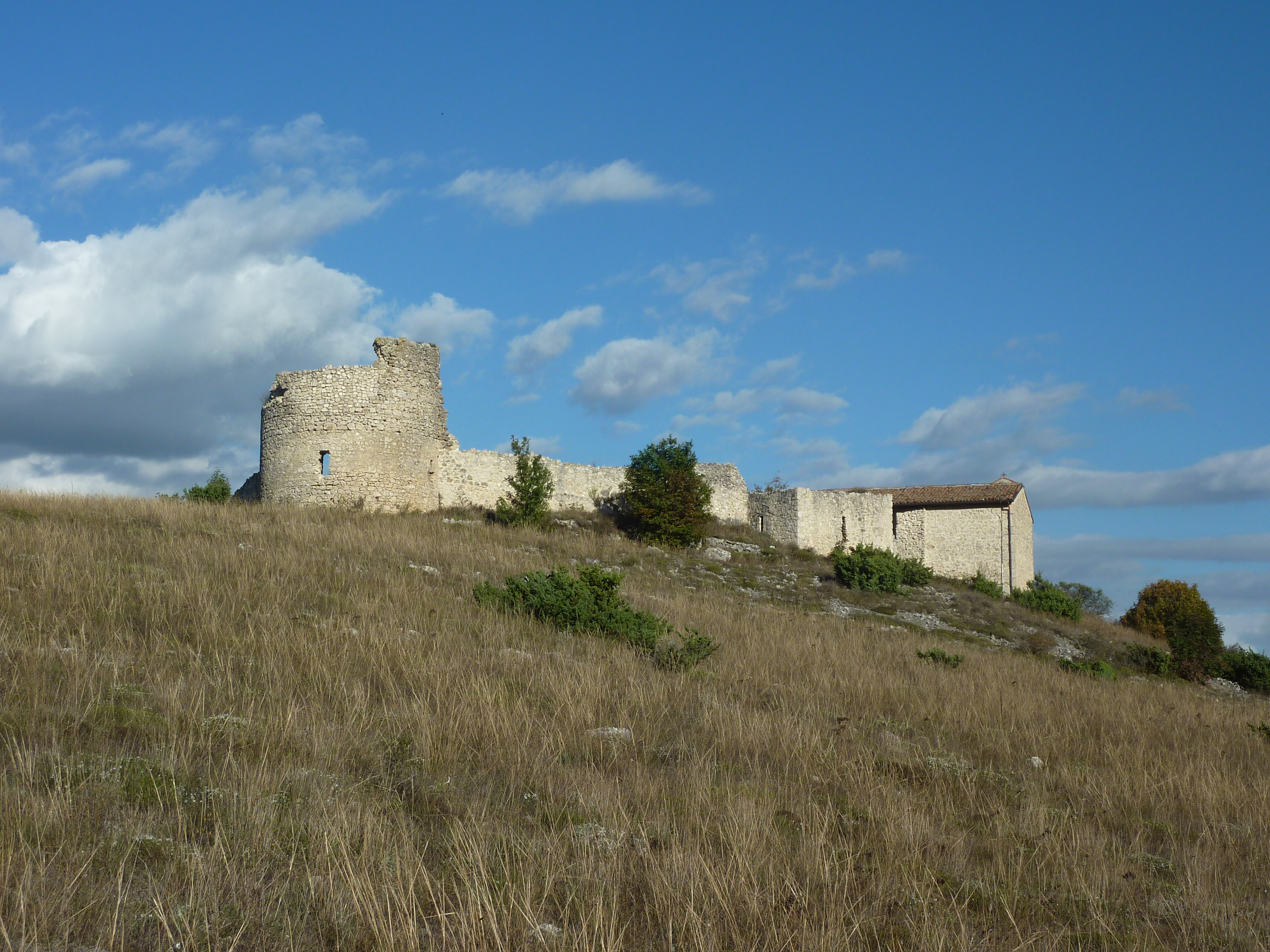

- Coat of arms

- Location within Italy Location within Abruzzo
- Coordinates: 42°17′20″N 13°31′31″E
- Country: Italy
- Region: Abruzzo
- Province: L'Aquila (AQ)
- Frazioni: Casentino

Government
  - Mayor: Giovanni Berardinangelo

Area
  - Total: 7.97 km^{2} (3.08 sq mi)
- Elevation: 591 m (1,939 ft)

Population (31 December 2010)
  - Total: 413
  - Density: 51.8/km^{2} (134/sq mi)
- Demonym: Santeusaniesi
- Time zone: UTC+1 (CET)
  - Summer (DST): UTC+2 (CEST)
- Postal code: 67020
- Dialing code: 0862
- Saint day: July 9

Sant'Eusanio Forconese is a comune and town in the province of L'Aquila in the Abruzzo region of southern Italy.

Sant'Eusanio is a hamlet nestled in the mountains of central Italy.

== Main sights ==
- Castle
