= Edmund, 2nd Earl of Cornwall =

Edmund of Almain
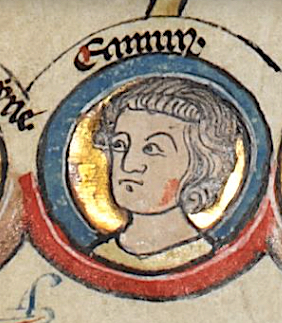

Earl of Cornwall
- Predecessor: Richard, 1st Earl
- Born: 26 December 1249; Berkhamsted Castle, Hertfordshire, England
- Died: bef. 25 September 1300 (aged 50)
- Burial: Heart & Flesh: Ashridge, Hertfordshire; Bones: 23 March 1301; Hailes Abbey, Gloucestershire
- Spouse: Margaret de Clare
- House: Plantagenet
- Father: Richard, 1st Earl of Cornwall
- Mother: Sanchia of Provence

Edmund of Almain (26 December 1249 – 1300) was the second Earl of Cornwall of the fourth creation from 1272. He joined the Ninth Crusade in 1271, but never made it to the Holy Land. He was the regent of the Kingdom of England from 1286 to 1289 and the High Sheriff of Cornwall from 1289 to 1300.

== Early life ==
Edmund was born at Berkhamsted Castle on 26 December 1249 and was the son of the king's brother, Richard, 1st Earl of Cornwall, and his second wife Sanchia of Provence, daughter of Ramon Berenguer, Count of Provence, and sister of Henry III's queen, Eleanor. Thus a paternal uncle (with a maternal aunt as consort) sat on the throne, followed by their eldest son from 1272 until Edmund's death.

He was baptised by his mother's uncle, Boniface of Savoy, Archbishop of Canterbury, and was named Edmund in honour of Saint Edmund of Abingdon, Boniface's predecessor as archbishop.

In 1257, Edmund joined his parents on their first visit to Germany, to pursue Richard's nominal or claimant title as king to the Holy Roman Empire, returning in January 1259. In 1264, after his father's capture at the Battle of Lewes, Edmund was held prisoner with his father at Kenilworth Castle, being released in September 1265. He and his father returned to Germany in August 1268, and according to a semi-mythical account written many years later, acquired a relic of the blood of Jesus Christ that had belonged to Charlemagne, before returning to England in August 1269. He is said to have given part of this relic to the monks of his father's foundation at Hailes Abbey in Gloucestershire, following a ceremony in September 1270, and part to Ashridge Priory, Hertfordshire.

In February 1271, Edmund sailed with his cousin, Edmund Crouchback, to join the crusade of the Lord Edward, Crouchback's elder brother. Edmund's father, Richard, already had one surviving son from his marriage to his first wife Isabel Marshal, Henry of Almain, fourteen years older than Edmund, who was originally destined to inherit Richard's lands and titles. On 13 March 1271, while attending mass at Viterbo, Henry was attacked and killed by his cousins Guy de Montfort and Simon de Montfort the Younger, sons of Simon de Montfort, in revenge for the brutal deaths of their father and older brother at Evesham. Hearing of this, the King commanded Edmund not to proceed any further and to return to England.

== Succession and marriage ==
Following Richard's death on 2 April 1272, Edmund was recognised as his heir, and swore homage to the king for his father's estates on or before 1 May 1272. In the July of that year, Edmund obtained a four-year lease of the town and Lordship of Leicester from Edmund Crouchback, who was still abroad on the crusade. On 6 October 1272, Edmund married Margaret, sister of Gilbert de Clare, at the chapel in Ruislip. On 13 October, on the feast of Edward the Confessor, Edmund was knighted by Henry III at Westminster Abbey and invested with his father's honours and titles as Earl of Cornwall. Although his father's claim to the German crown and title of Holy Roman Emperor lapsed with his father's death, Edmund continued to style himself 'Edmund of Almain', or 'Edmund earl of Cornwall, son of Richard the king of Germany'.

== Royal service ==
When Henry III died in November 1272, Edmund took a post in the governing council in England, and was among the councillors who wrote to Edward I to advise him of his father's death. Having inherited vast wealth from his own father, Edmund began making loans to prominent members of the court. In June 1273 he travelled to France to meet Edward I, and two months later, in Paris, acknowledged the repayment of 2,000 of the 3,000 marks that the king owed him. Edmund was present at Edward's coronation in Westminster Abbey, and in summer 1277 took fourteen of his knights to join Edward's expedition to Wales. In 1279 Edmund was appointed, along with Thomas de Cantilupe, Bishop of Hereford, and Godfrey de Giffard, Bishop of Worcester, to the regency council formed to govern England when Edward and Eleanor, the Queen consort, travelled to France to take possession of Ponthieu. Edmund also lent the king 3000 marks that year, to aid a re-coinage. In May 1280 he travelled abroad with the abbot of Colchester, and in June, with the assistance of Eleanor and Robert Burnell, Bishop of Bath, resolved a long-standing dispute with the bishop of Exeter over rival jurisdictions.

Between April 1282 and December 1284 Edmund served as Edward I's lieutenant in the government whilst the king conducted a campaign in Wales, mediated the collection of the clerical subsidy towards the costs of the proposed crusade, ensured the exchequer rolls were transported to Shrewsbury, attended a clerical convocation in Northampton in January 1283 as the king's representative, as well as taking custody of wardships and estates on his personal account.

Between 13 May 1286 and 12 August 1289, Edward I crossed the channel to restore order in Gascony and mediate between Alfons, King of Aragon and Charles the lame, King of Sicily, Edmund acted as regent in England. When Rhys ap Maredudd of Dryslwyn captured Llandovery Castle in June 1287, Edmund suppressed the rebellion, taking Dryslwyn in September; Rhys, however, evaded capture and went into hiding. Edmund met the cost of this campaign with loans from Italian merchants of about £10,000. In June 1289 Edmund mediated between Humphrey de Bohun, Earl of Hereford, and Gilbert de Clare, Earl of Gloucester, in a dispute over the Welsh marches between their lands, and forbade de Clare to build a castle at Morlais in Brecknockshire. Edward's return to England was followed by an inquiry into wrongdoings by the government during his absence, and though several judges and officials were disgraced, Edmund was retrospectively pardoned for any forest offences and allowed to answer by proxy any complaints against his administration in Cornwall, where he was High Sheriff from 1289 to 1300.

== Church and state ==
In 1288 Edmund had a chapel built in Abingdon in honour of St Edmund Rich. The monks of the abbey there saw Edmund as 'a kind of bounteous defender and protector' and undertook to provide two priests to say masses for the souls of Edmund and his ancestors in the chapel. In September 1289 he visited Oxford to attend the translation of Frideswide's relics. In April 1290 a writ was served on Edmund demanding his presence at the Archbishop of Canterbury's court; this became one of the earliest recorded breaches of what was later termed parliamentary privilege, and the archbishop was fined £10,000. Edward I celebrated Christmas of that year at Edmund's manor at Ashridge in Hertfordshire, where he held parliament and discussed the business of Scotland. Edmund's loans were vital to the Crown: he had lent Edward £4,000 that year, and he lent a further £4,000 to Antony Bek, Bishop of Durham, to be repaid from the revenue of Howden Manor. In May 1296 the king entrusted prisoners captured in the Scottish campaign to Edmund's castles at Wallingford and Berkhampsted; it is said he also ordered Edmund's treasure to be moved from Berkhampsted to London. In 1297 Edmund was summoned to Gascony and was absent during the crisis between the king and barons. Later that year Edmund promised the output of his mines in Cornwall and Devon as repayment for 7,000 marks the king owed the men of Bayonne, and served as councillor to the king's son, Edward, who was governing England during the king's absence. By 1299 the Crown owed Edmund £6,500 and borrowed a further 2,000 marks, to be repaid from the profits of the vacant archbishopric of York.

== Death ==
In July 1297 Edmund was granted licence to make a will, his poor health is mentioned in a summons of December 1298, and by 1300 he was terminally ill. The date Edmund died is unknown, but was before 25 September 1300 when Edward I commanded celebration of exequies for the late earl. The following day the royal escheators were ordered to take hold of Edmund's estates. Edmund's heart and flesh were buried at Ashridge, attended by the king's son Edward, and on 23 March 1301 his bones were placed in Hailes Abbey, attended by the king in person. Since he left no children, Edmund's entire estate passed to the crown, excepting a dower for his widow.

Peerage of England
Preceded by Richard	Earl of Cornwall; 1272–1300	Extinct
