= Castle of Ocre =

Medieval castle in Abruzzo, Italy

- Castello di Ocre
- Ocre
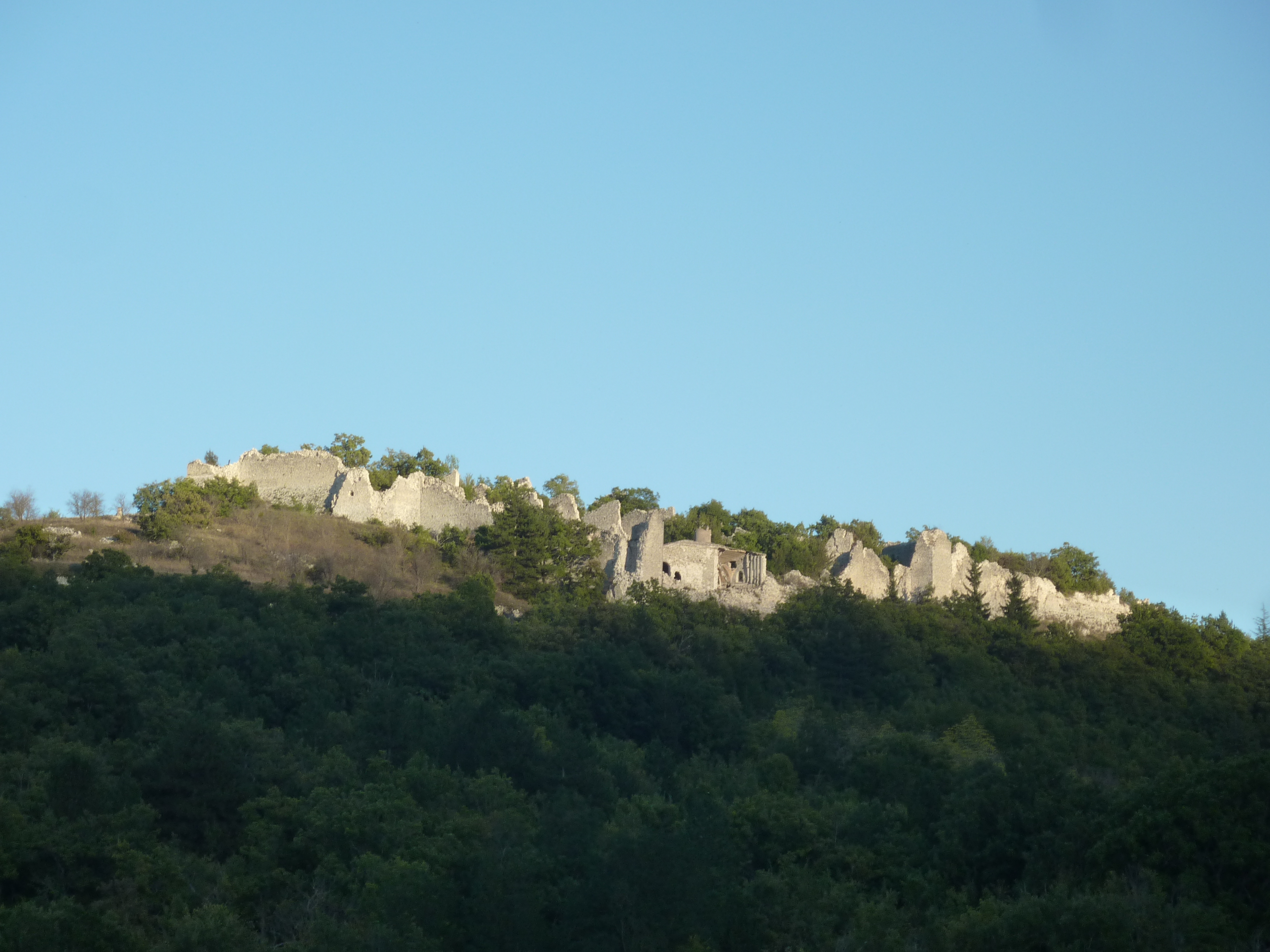
- Castle in Ocre

Site information
- Type: Castle

Location
- Coordinates: 42.291737°N 13.482917°E

Site history
- Built: 12th century

Castello di Ocre is a medieval castle in Ocre, Province of L'Aquila, Abruzzo, southern Italy.

== History ==
The first source to mention the castle of Ocre is a Papal bull of Pope Alexander III in 1178 in which it is mentioned among the possessions of the diocese of Forcona. In 1254, it was mentioned with the name of "Cassari Castro" among those saved from destruction during the founding of the town of L'Aquila.

In 1266, during the reign of Charles I of Naples, the castle was ravaged by troops from L'Aquila after the reconstruction of the city previously destroyed by Manfred, King of Sicily with the support of the barons of the castle. Charles of Anjou confiscated the castles close to L'Aquila as a result of their support to Conradin, and in 1269 the castle of Ocre was given to Morel de Saours.

In 1283, the castle was assigned to Giovanni di Bissone and in 1293 it suffered another plunder by troops from L'Aquila. The most destructive attack, however, was launched in 1423 by the condottiero Braccio da Montone. Losing the role of defending the city of L'Aquila, the castle started a gradual decline: at the beginning of the 16th century Ocre is no longer mentioned as "castrum" but as a "villa", with the population gradually abandoning the fortified village.

== Architecture ==
The castle is actually more properly classified as "fortified village". The walls, in fact, include old houses, a tower houses and streets.

The plan is an isosceles triangle, with a perimeter of 470 m, the base (which is also the shortest side) to the northwest and the apex of the triangle to the southeast. The walls includes seven towers.

The only entrance to the castle is located at the corner tower on the west side and consists of an arched door dated back to the 13th century and protected by a defense system.

In the southern part of the village there is a church, dedicated to the Holy Saviour "inter castrum Ocre". Built on a nave and two aisles with an apse at the end and known since 1581, it is completely ruined now. From this church come the remains of a fresco of the mid 12th Century, depicting the Madonna and Child, today at the National Museum of Abruzzo.
