= Sicilian business =

Attempted English takeover of Sicily (1254–1263)

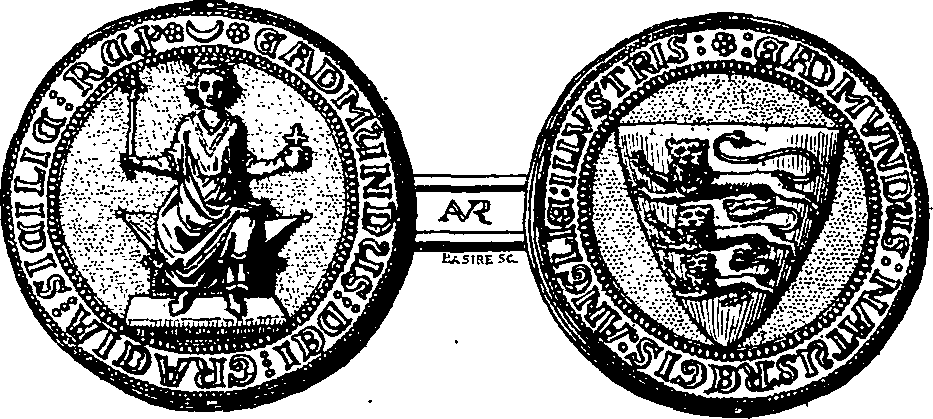
An engraving of the seal of Edmund, son of Henry III of England, in his capacity as King of Sicily during the "Sicilian business", produced in 1254 by order of Henry III on behalf of the child-king.

The "Sicilian business" is a historiographical term used to describe the failed attempt by Henry III of England to claim the Kingdom of Sicily for his son Edmund, who had been offered the throne by the papacy. (Note: The term negotium regni siciliae can be traced to a contemporaneous letter from Henry III to the English diplomat William Bonquer.) Sicily, established in the twelfth century as a theoretical papal fief, had been ruled by Holy Roman Emperor Frederick II from 1198 until his death in 1250; Pope Innocent IV now sought to install an agreeable sovereign to succeed his longtime adversary. After failed negotiations with Edmund's uncles Richard of Cornwall and Charles of Anjou, the papacy formally offered the throne to the English prince in 1254. For the project, Henry III was tasked with delivering Edmund and armed forces to Sicily to claim it from Manfred, who was serving as regent for Frederick II's grandson Conradin; the papacy was to offer assistance.

A strategic marriage was planned for Edmund; potential brides were the dowager queen of Cyprus or a daughter of Manfred in order to resolve the dispute over the kingdom. Neither union came to fruition, and despite continued attempts to secure support and financing, Henry III's efforts to establish Edmund as the Sicilian monarch faced numerous setbacks. Pope Alexander IV, who had succeeded Innocent IV in 1254, was no longer in a position to effectively finance the project, demanding payment from Henry III as compensation for the papacy's contributions to the campaign. Finding only minimal support from Parliament and faced with the threat of excommunication from Rome, Henry III resorted to extorting money from his domestic clergy in an attempt to pay the debts. The "Sicilian business" became entangled with broader political troubles in England, and the project ultimately collapsed. Pope Urban IV formally revoked the grant of the Kingdom of Sicily to Edmund in 1263 and instead consigned it to Charles of Anjou, who successfully assumed control of the kingdom in 1266.

The failure of the project has historically been a source of ignominy for Henry III, with contemporary barons in England citing the incident as justification for restricting the monarch's powers. Historians have likewise singled out the incident as one of the motivations for the political upheaval that would occur in England in the years following, but some recent scholarship has questioned this point of view, instead arguing that the mission's lack of success was not entirely the fault of Henry III but rather a consequence of the intricate political situation in Europe.

== Background ==
The territorial extent of the Kingdom of Sicily in 1190, a few decades before the events of the "Sicilian business"

In the eleventh century, papal attempts to assert dominance over Christendom led to a unique, symbiotic relationship between the Catholic Church and Normans. (Note: The term "Normans" is in reference to the House of Hauteville, which conquered and settled the area that would become the Kingdom of Sicily with the assistance of a military force that was composed of, among other groups, Normans.) By 1129, one of the members of the house, Count Roger II of Sicily, had successfully consolidated power in the southern areas of the Italian Peninsula, and by the following year, his barons urged him to assume a royal title. That same year, Antipope Anacletus II (r. 1130–1138; who was engaged in a power struggle over the papal throne) dispatched a legate to enthrone Roger as king; the coronation ceremony occurred on 25 December 1130. Authorization for the establishment of the kingdom, as well as royal authority, were received from the Church, (Note: Despite Anacletus II's inability to secure the papal title, both Roger and his successors were able to establish a relationship with the Papacy that allowed them to maintain recognition of the Sicilian monarchy.) a dynamic that caused the historian David Abulafia to refer to the Sicilian sovereigns as "papal vassals". As such, Sicily was theoretically a papal fief.

The inaugural monarchs of the fledgling Kingdom of Sicily were allies of the papacy against the Holy Roman emperor; concurrently, the emperors were engaged in recurrent conflict with the papacy's ostensible, universal temporal authority. By the time of Frederick II, who ruled both the Holy Roman Empire (r. 1220–1250) and the Kingdom of Sicily (r. 1198–1250) in personal union, (Note: Frederick inherited the throne of Sicily as the son of Roger II's daughter Constance I of Sicily.) the struggle between the parties had intensified to extreme proportions, with Sicily being confiscated from the emperor in 1245 as part of the papacy's repeated attempts to dissolve the union of the kingdom and the Empire. After Frederick's purported deposition, Pope Innocent IV (r. 1243–1254) embarked on a search for a new king who would be agreeable to the papacy and be able to contend with the emperor. Offers were forwarded to the courts of the kingdoms of France and England, but Frederick's incumbency dissuaded any acceptances of the Sicilian throne.

== The search for a king ==
Frederick II died on 13 December 1250, and his death only revitalised the efforts of the papacy to displace the Hohenstaufen dynasty from their domains. In his will, the late Emperor bequeathed the Kingdom of Sicily to his son Conrad, King of Germany (r. 1237–1254). Frederick's successor found himself in conflict with Innocent IV, who sought to undermine the personal union of the German and Sicilian kingdoms. In August 1252, Innocent IV sent letters to Henry III of England and Louis IX of France, attempting to find a potential monarch in either of their brothers, Richard of Cornwall or Charles of Anjou, respectively. Richard rejected the offer, likening the difficulty of claiming the kingdom to removing the moon from the sky; Charles likewise turned down the proposal on the advice of Louis and their mother Blanche of Castile.

In January of the following year, Henry III conveyed his gratitude to the Pope for the offer of Sicily, and by December, the papal notary Albert of Parma was authorised to convey to Henry III the terms under which Sicily would be bestowed on him. These terms remain unknown, but they would have been similar to those offered to Charles: payment of 1000 ounces of gold, a further 10,000 for the restoration of a papal enclave in southern Italy, a yearly tribute of 2000 ounces, and the provision of fifty knights to the papacy. These conditions emphasised the vassal relationship of the kings of Sicily to the papacy; they also reflected Innocent IV's goal of safeguarding the Papal States and sundering the union of the Empire and Sicily; indeed, the establishment of a new monarch in Sicily would ensure that the domains of the Holy See would not suffer the strain they had endured under Frederick II. By January 1254, the discord between the papacy and the Hohenstaufen king had escalated: Conrad leveled allegations of heresy and usurpation against the pontiff, which engendered his excommunication by Innocent IV the following month. Conrad died on 21 May; the only legitimate Hohenstaufen heir remaining was his two-year-old son Conradin. On his deathbed, Conrad entrusted Conradin to the care of Innocent IV, who promptly assumed papal control over Sicily (claiming it had reverted to the Papacy) with the understanding that Conradin would assume power in the future. Manfred, an illegitimate son of Frederick II, assumed the regency for Conradin, who was sent to Bavaria. The political situation in Europe was altered as a result of Conrad's death and the usurpation of power by Manfred. Louis IX personally disapproved of the regent's character, but regarded the throne of Sicily as rightfully Conradin's.

Richard remained unenthused about the prospect of the Sicilian throne, instead focusing his energies on his election as King of the Romans. His brother Henry III was interested in the prospect of installing his younger son Edmund as a monarch; whether the prince was himself interested is unknown. The prince's candidacy was likely proposed earlier, but did not materialise due to the candidacy of Charles of Anjou and Henry's personal regard for Frederick II's son Henry (his nephew through his sister Isabella of England) and his hereditary rights. After Charles had formally declined the throne on 30 October 1253 and Henry of Hohenstaufen's death a short time afterward, Henry III again expressed interest in the Sicilian throne, entering into discussions with Albert of Parma. After a brief attempt to reconcile with Manfred that came to nothing, Innocent IV again resumed correspondence with the court of England in which he accepted Edmund as monarch of Sicily, but also ambiguously mentioned the rights of Conradin.

== Selection of Edmund of England ==
=== Motivations of Henry III ===
The historian Björn Weiler argues that "...the Sicilian Business was a logical continuation of the king's crusading plans, and indicative of a diplomatic approach increasingly focused on the Mediterranean, but it was also driven by competition with and fear of the Capetians". Situating Edmund on a foreign throne would have brought great prestige to the royal house of England, and with Plantagenet presence in the Mediterranean, Henry III could make use of the Sicilian kingdom as a base from which he could initiate a future crusade.

=== Edmund as nominal King of Sicily ===
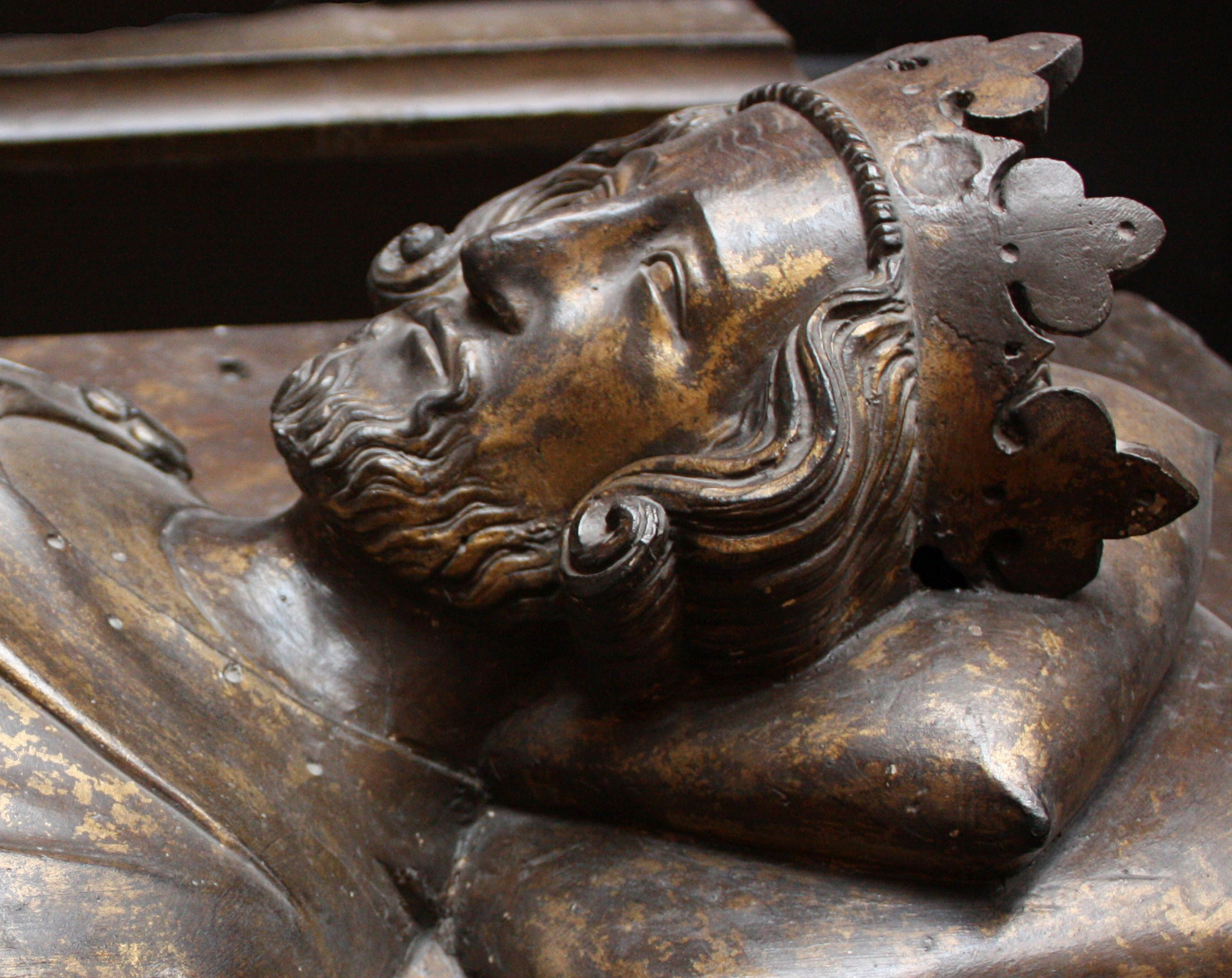
Effigy of King Henry III in Westminster Abbey, c. 1272

Albert formally offered the Kingdom of Sicily to the ten-year-old Edmund on 6 March 1254; the grant was affirmed by Innocent IV on 14 May. Henry III accepted the offer on behalf of his son. The "Sicilian business" would come to dominate English political affairs, despite neither Henry III nor Edmund having been there in person. The people of England were not eager to pay taxes to finance the Italian campaign, which lacked the religious justification that Henry III's crusading taxes had. On 15 May, Henry III ordered the production of a great seal for Edmund in his capacity as nominal monarch. Innocent IV appears to have expected Henry III to act rapidly, insisting that same month that Edmund be delivered to the Continent at once with the incentive of monetary support. In spite of several complications, including a failure to raise substantial money from the English, unrest in Gascony, the upcoming wedding of his heir Edward to Eleanor of Castile, and tensions with the French, Henry III made preparations to assert his son's claim to the Kingdom of Sicily. As part of these preparations, Edmund's relative Thomas of Savoy was raised to the station of Prince of Capua. Innocent IV likewise took steps to promote Plantagenet dominion in Sicily by recruiting allies, among them Berthold of Hohenberg, who had been named as regent of Sicily by the late Conrad IV, and Frederick of Antioch, one of Frederick II's natural sons. Through these efforts, the Plantagenet regime in the Kingdom of Sicily was constituted by experienced men who had served under the administration of Conrad IV. On a state visit to the court of Louis IX in December 1254, the French king agreed to not contest Edmund's nomination as King of Sicily.

Innocent IV had died on 7 December and was succeeded by Alexander IV (r. 1254–1261), who pursued a careful diplomatic approach, even entering into discussions with Manfred concerning the acknowledgment of Hohenstaufen dominion in Sicily. The attempted peace failed, and by March Henry III was again urged to make haste for Italy. New talks confirmed Edmund's enfeoffment, but elucidated the conditions of the grant on 9 April 1255. As part of the concession of Sicily by the papacy, several conditions were to be met. The liege kingdom was to be held at the price of 2000 ounces of gold per annum, as well as an appended supply of 300 knights for three months when needed. Because of Edmund's minority, Henry III was to do homage for Sicily on behalf of his son until Edmund reached the age of fifteen. Additionally, the papacy demanded a payment of 135,541 marks (Note: This was equivalent to £90,360.) as compensation for the efforts being made to supplant Manfred. Edmund was also forbidden from ever seeking election as Holy Roman Emperor. Henry III agreed to these terms, and speaking about these conditions, Weiler reasons that "By making Edmund's exercise of regal rights dependent upon his arrival in Sicily, the pope may have hoped that this would provide the necessary incentive for the English court to speed up its preparations"; the urgency was caused by the increasingly precarious situation in Sicily, where Manfred still remained at large. By spring 1255, Manfred had attained several victories and posed a direct threat to the Papal States; Alexander IV was desperate for assistance and attempted to financially support Henry III for a Sicilian expedition, and also called on the courts of Europe for aid.

The bishop of Bologna, Giacomo Boncambio, arrived in England and formally enfeoffed Edmund with Sicily in October 1255 on behalf of the Pope. Henry III styled his son as king and presented him with a ring. Accompanying the bishop was the papal representative Rostand Masson, who was tasked with collecting the sum of money owed to Rome by Henry III. The situation in the Italian peninsula continued to devolve, as Henry III's sluggishness continued and allowed Manfred to expand his influence in the area. Conradin affirmed Manfred as his representative in Sicily, a show of Hohenstaufen solidarity. Alexander IV requested support from his allies in England, but Henry III was not in a position to meet his requests. His government had rejected his request to raise more funds, and in correspondence with the Pope in 1256, the English king asked for more lenient terms.

== Efforts to claim Sicily ==
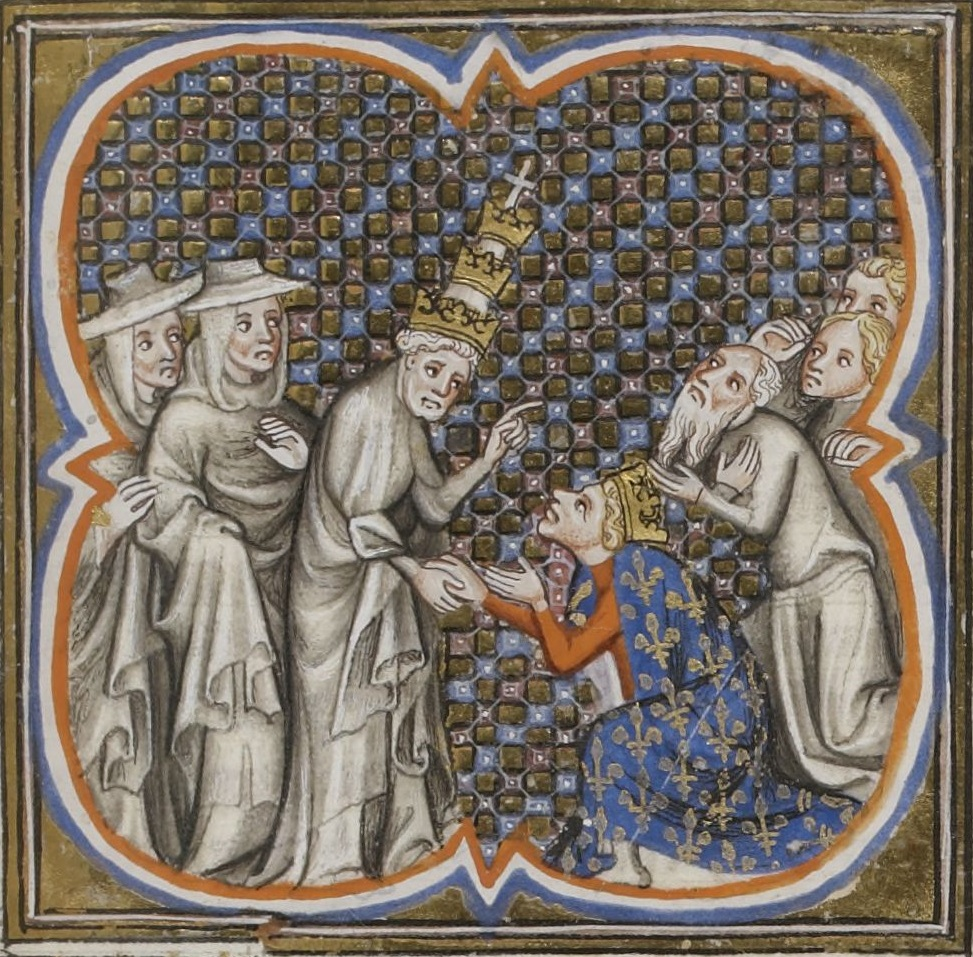
A fourteenth-century illuminated manuscript depicting Louis IX kneeling before Pope Innocent IV, recognisable by his three-tiered papal tiara

=== Marriage negotiations ===
Henry III entered into negotiations in 1256 to organize Edmund's marriage. One potential bride for the young king was Plaisance of Antioch, the dowager queen of Cyprus (and now regent of that kingdom); this possibility mandated that the Cypriot king Hugh II, son of Plaisance, wed Edmund's sister Beatrice. A second marriage alliance was also considered with one of the daughters of Manfred; the conditions of this marriage would see Manfred concede Sicily to Edmund after the marriage occurred. Ultimately, neither marriage came to fruition.

=== Domestic difficulties ===
Henry III faced difficulties financing his son's accession to the Sicilian throne. The English were not enthusiastic about having to finance the endeavor and could not be persuaded otherwise, in spite of Henry III's pleads to be granted a subsidy. The King even paraded Edmund, donned in Sicilian royal regalia, before the English magnates at a parliament in 1257, but to no avail. Manfred's continued presence in the administration of Sicily proved to be a recurring issue as well; by 1257, he had taken control of the entire island of Sicily, and amidst rumours of Conradin's death, the 26-year-old Manfred was, in spite of the papacy's wishes, crowned King of Sicily on 10 August 1258 at Palermo Cathedral and received homage from the Sicilian nobles.

Despite the large sums forwarded to Rome thus far, Henry III still owed quite an amount. Rostand, who had returned to the Continent, returned to England in March 1257 with the archbishop of Messina, Giovanni Colonna, to request further payments. The two were received by the King and the twelve-year-old Edmund, who was dressed in Apulian robes. In April, however, Henry III cancelled payments to the Pope, citing uncertainty as to whether he wished to continue with Edmund's bid for the throne. More lenient terms were offered to the English, but Henry III was commanded to reconcile with France and travel to Sicily by March 1259 with an army numbering no fewer than 8,500.

Domestically, the "Sicilian business" was part of a wider array of political troubles that eventually gave rise to the 1258 Provisions of Oxford and attempts by the English barons to assert control over the monarchy. These magnates were discontent with many of the unpopular policies of Henry III's reign, including the alarming amount of money being allotted for Edmund's bid for the Sicilian throne, and the baronial government, which has been installed in accordance with the terms of the Provisions of Oxford, requested changes to the conditions of the Sicilian offer; on 18 December 1258, Alexander IV revoked the offer unless the previously discussed conditions were met. By this point, Alexander IV found it increasingly difficult to pay for the project, and facing military pressure, he dispatched an envoy to the English court and, with the threat of excommunication, demanded an army to be sent to Sicily and the payment of £90,000 from Henry III as financial compensation for the efforts to install Edmund. (Note: Medieval England principally used silver pennies; larger sums of silver pennies were typically expressed in financial accounts as pounds (240 pennies) or marks (160 pennies). It is impossible to accurately estimate the modern equivalent value of thirteenth-century money; for comparison, in the early part of the thirteenth century, £66 was close to the average annual income of a poorer baron; £6,666 in 1216 was almost 25 per cent of the Crown's revenue for the year; shortly after Henry III's death, his son Edward I spent approximately £80,000 on his castle-building programme in North Wales, an immense outlay for the time.) Requesting assistance from Parliament was again futile; seeing that he could not force the hands of his lay magnates, the King instead resorted to extorting money from the senior clergy of England, who were coerced into signing blank charters, promising to finance effectively unlimited sums of money in support of the "Sicilian business". In this manner, Henry III raised around £40,000. The English Church was displeased, feeling that the money was being wasted on a vain effort. Weiler argues that "...the baronial rebellion put an end to the Sicilian Business, but its demise was accidental rather than intentional. The problem his barons had with the king was not that he sought to get the Sicilian throne for his son, but how he went about getting it".

=== Failure and aftermath ===
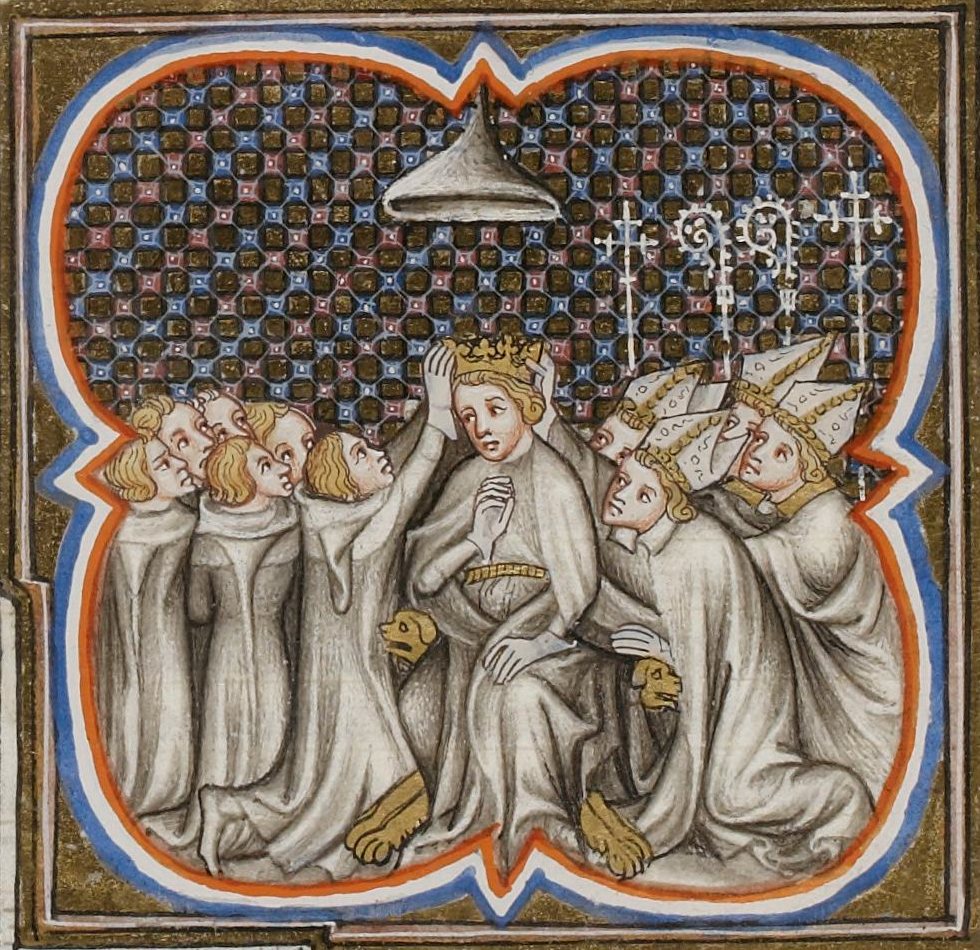
The coronation of Charles of Anjou as King of Sicily in Rome (1266), illustration from the next century.

In March 1261, Edmund ordered the Sicilians to make preparations for his arrival, but on 28 July 1263, Pope Urban IV (r. 1261–1264) formally rescinded the grant of Sicily and sent the archbishop of Cosenza, Bartolomeo Pignatelli, to England to exonerate Edmund and his father of the terms of the Sicilian concession. Instead, Urban sent Albert to the court of Louis IX to again offer the throne of Sicily to Charles. The French prince was designated as King of Sicily and soon found himself beset by the same problems that had burdened Henry III, but he was eventually able to expel the Hohenstaufen. In 1266, French forces defeated Manfred and subdued Conradin two years later, securing Charles' rule in Sicily.

== Legacy ==
Weiler argues that the impact of the "Sicilian business" on English history was "momentous", citing the contemporary baronial government' complaints about the wasteful nature of the project. He claims that the ultimate failure of the ambitious plan was not the fault of Henry III, who had only sought to expand Plantagenet influence in the face of an unfavourable political situation in Europe. The historian David Carpenter, who specialises in the life and reign of Henry III, points to the "Sicilian business" as one of the key factors that inspired the revolution of 1258 led by Simon de Montfort, 6th Earl of Leicester. Runciman writes that "The whole affair was chiefly important for its effect on the internal history of England; for it ushered in the Baron's War and the constitutional quarrels and developments that filled the latter part of King Henry III's reign". In a retrospective analysis, Weiler and Runciman reason that Edmund's installation as King of Sicily might have been possible if the English populace had been willing to finance the project. Although Runciman claims that the mission would have found more success if the papacy had been less brash about its financial demands, Weiler argues that the financial cost of the Sicilian expedition was actually reasonable, citing England's ability to raise funding to ransom Richard I of England in the 1190s, which had a similar cost.
