= Crusade against the Hohenstaufen =

Series of European religious wars, 1240–1268

The crusade against the Hohenstaufen was a series of wars launched against the rulers of the Hohenstaufen dynasty with the support and encouragement of the Papacy between 1240 and 1268. The campaigns followed the excommunication of Frederick II, Holy Roman Emperor, in 1239 and ended with the death of his grandson Conradin, a claimant to the Kingdom of Sicily.

On 20 March 1239, Pope Gregory IX excommunicated Frederick II, who was in Padua at the time preparing to campaign against the Lombard League. Almost immediately, Gregory began attacking the emperor in propaganda, aimed especially at Frederick's enemies. The legate Gregory of Montelongo effectively allied the papacy with the League. The network of north Italian cities opposed to the emperor was expanded to include Milan and Piacenza, while Genoa and Venice, through papal mediation, agreed to launch an offensive against the emperor.

The war against Frederick was transformed into a crusade in February 1240, when, in response to Frederick's march on Rome, the pope led the citizens of Rome to take the sign of the cross and offered general indulgences for the defence of the city. The call for a crusade provoked an immediate response in Genoa and Ferrara. Frederick called off his march. In March, he issued an encyclical accusing the pope of preaching a crusade against him.

The crusade came to Germany in 1241, when Archbishops Conrad of Cologne and Siegfried III of Mainz invaded Hohenstaufen lands in the Wetterau. A major turning point was the deposition of Frederick II by Pope Innocent IV at the First Council of Lyon in 1245. This sparked a period of intense crusading in Germany after May 1246. Two rival kings were elected in Germany and both pursued the crusade against the Hohenstaufen, Henry Raspe in 1246–1247 and William II of Holland in 1247–1251. Raspe won a victory over Frederick's son, Conrad IV, at the battle of Frankfurt in August 1246. Frederick died in 1250. Conrad left Germany permanently for Sicily in October 1251.

Conrad IV died in 1254 and his half-brother Manfred took control of Sicily. Under Pope Alexander IV, a crusade was preached against him in 1254–1255. It attracted a small English army in support of Edmund Crouchback, the English candidate to the Sicilian throne, but it was defeated by Manfred. Pope Urban IV in 1261 and Pope Clement IV in 1265 proclaimed crusades in favour of a new candidate, Count Charles I of Anjou. Charles defeated Manfred at the battle of Benevento in 1266. A new crusade was preached against the son of Conrad IV, Conradin. In 1268, when he attempted to claim Sicily, Conradin was killed in the battle of Tagliacozzo. The last crusade against the Hohenstaufen was simultaneous with a crusade against the Muslim settlement of Lucera, which backed Conradin. Lucera fell in August 1269 to the forces of Charles of Anjou.

== Bibliography ==
- Abulafia, David (1988). Frederick II: A Medieval Emperor. Allen Lane.
- Cusa, Giuseppe (2024). "Crusades in the Holy Roman Empire (Late 1220s to the Early 1250s)". In Mike Carr; Nikolaos G. Chrissis; Gianluca Raccagni (eds.). Crusading Against Christians in the Middle Ages. Palgrave Macmillan. pp. 233–253. doi:10.1007/978-3-031-47339-5_10.
- Hufschmid, Michelle T. (2020). The Crusade Against the Staufer in Germany, 1246–51 (PhD dissertation). University of Oxford.
- Loud, Graham A. (1993). "The Case of the Missing Martyrs: Frederick II's War with the Church 1239–1250". Studies in Church History. 30: 141–152. doi:10.1017/s0424208400011670.
- Loud, Graham A. (2016) [2011]. "The Papal 'Crusade' against Frederick II in 1228–1230". In Michel Balard (ed.). La Papauté et les croisades / The Papacy and the Crusades. Routledge. pp. 91–103.
- Lower, Michael (2023). "Gregory IX and the Crusades". In Smith, Damian J. (ed.). Pope Gregory IX (1227–1241): Power and Authority. Amsterdam University Press. pp. 127–150. doi:10.1515/9789048554607-008.
- Migliazzo, Francesco (2024). "Holy War and Crusade in Southern Italy: Twelfth to Fourteenth Centuries". In Mike Carr; Nikolaos G. Chrissis; Gianluca Raccagni (eds.). Crusading Against Christians in the Middle Ages. Palgrave Macmillan. pp. 233–253. doi:10.1007/978-3-031-47339-5_3.
- Milani, Giuliano (2013). "Uno snodo nella storia dell'esclusione: Urbano IV, la crociata contro Manfredi e l'avvio di nuove diseguaglianze nell'Italia bassomedievale". Mélanges de l'École française de Rome: Moyen Âge. 125 (2).
- Raccagni, Gianluca (2016). "The Crusade Against Frederick II: A Neglected Piece of Evidence" (PDF). The Journal of Ecclesiastical History. 67 (4): 721–740. doi:10.1017/S002204691600066X.
- Spence, Richard T. (1978). Pope Gregory IX and the Crusade (PhD dissertation). Syracuse University.
- Sodders, Daniel R. (1996). Conrad the Fourth as German King, 1237–1250 (PhD dissertation). University of Kansas.
- Strayer, Joseph R. (1969). "The Political Crusades of the Thirteenth Century". In R. L. Wolff; H. W. Hazard (eds.). A History of the Crusades, Volume II: The Later Crusades, 1189–1311. University of Wisconsin Press. pp. 343–375.
- Van Cleve, Thomas C. (1972). The Emperor Frederick II of Hohenstaufen: Immutator Mundi. Clarendon Press.
- Whalen, Brett Edward (2019). The Two Powers: The Papacy, the Empire, and the Struggle for Sovereignty in the Thirteenth Century. University of Pennsylvania Press.
