= Counts and dukes of Savoy =

Titles of nobility

Greater coat of arms of the King of Italy (1890–1946)

The titles of the count of Savoy, and then duke of Savoy, are titles of nobility attached to the historical territory of Savoy. Since its creation, in the 11th century, the House of Savoy held the county, the ruler of which was originally styled "count," then later as "duke"; several of these rulers were called "king" at one point in history or another.

The origins of the family are obscured by time. The first history of the House of Savoy appeared in 1660 and was written by a Frenchman Samuel Guichenon. At that time, Christine of France, the widow of Duke Victor Amadeus I, had conceived the idea of elevating the house of Savoy to the imperial throne. She was the one who requested Guichenon to write the history of the house, but insisted that Widukind, the famous leader of the Saxons, be its founder. Guichenon, being a courtier and also as a Frenchman always courteous to the fairer sex, promoted the princess's view in his book. Another opinion that gained traction at a certain point was that the Dukes of Savoy descended from the ancient Marquises of Ivrea, from whom descended also the last national kings of Italy, who, fighting for Italian independence against the German emperors were defeated. That opinion was once championed by historian Lodovico della Chiesa. The French authors Nicolas Chorier and Salvaing were, on the other hand, of the opinion, that the Dukes of Savoy had their origins in Burgundy. Therefore, the exact origins of this family, as of many noble families of Europe is unknown.

The County of Savoy was elevated to a duchy at the beginning of the 15th century, bringing together all the territories of the Savoyard state under Amadeus VIII, Duke of Savoy. In the 18th century, Victor Amadeus II annexed the Kingdom of Sardinia to the historical possessions of the Duchy, and from then on, the Savoyard dukes also held the title of King of Sardinia. The House of Savoy later went on to rule the Kingdom of Italy from 1861 to 1946, when the Italian monarchy was abolished after an institutional referendum.

Victor Amadeus II was the longest reigning monarch of Savoy, followed by Charles Emmanuel I, and Charles III or Amadeus VIII.

== Rulers of Savoy ==
=== House of Savoy ===
==== Partitions of Savoy ====
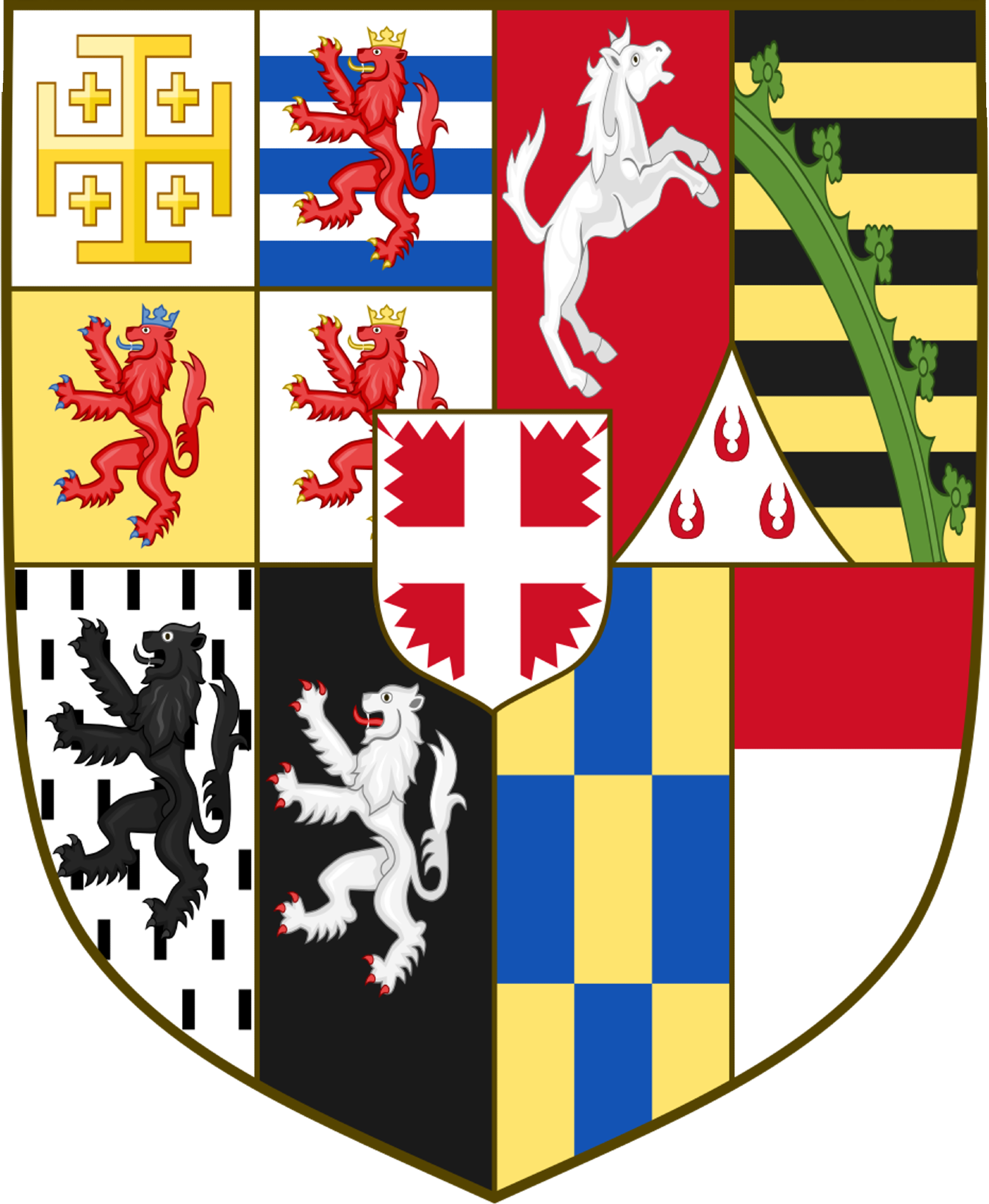
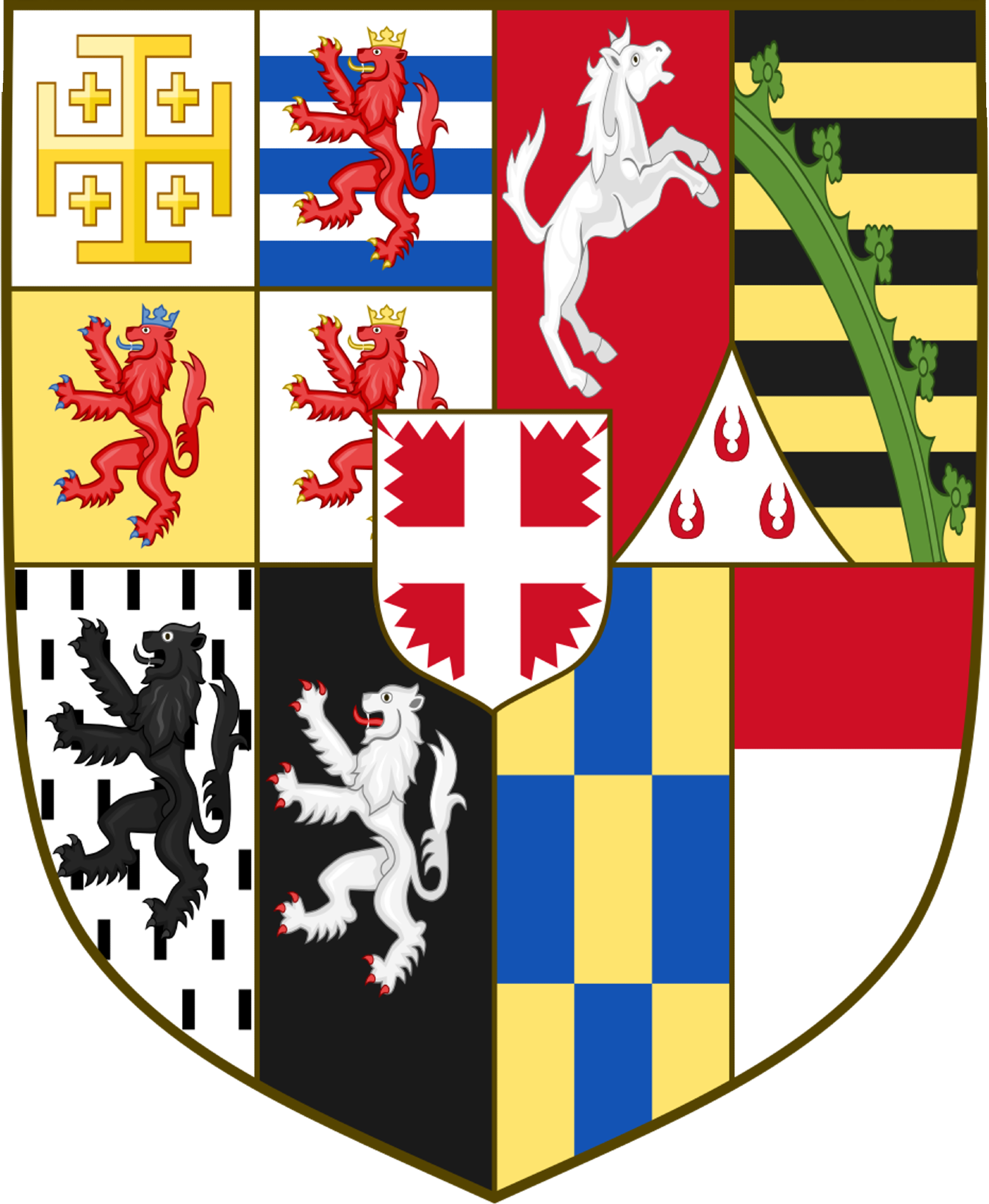
County of Savoy (1000–1416)
Lordship of Piedmont (1233–1418)	Barony of Vaud (1233–1359) (Note: Between 1271 and 1285, Vaud was briefly annexed to the main county of Savoy.)
Raised to: Duchy of Savoy (1416–1720)
Principality of Carignano (1620–1831)	County of Soissons (1656–1734)
Raised and merged into: Kingdom of Sardinia (1720–1861)
(Carignano line since 1831) Raised and unified as Kingdom of Italy (1861–1946)

County of Geneva (1394–1401)	Lordship of Nemours (1120–1274); Annexed to France; Raised to Duchy (1404–1516) (Note: Duchy ruled successively by Évreux (1404–1504), Foix (1507–1512) and Medici families (1515–1516))
County of Geneva (1440–1724)	Duchy of Nemours (1516–1528)
In 1652 Nemours returned to France

==== Table of rulers ====
Ruler	Born	Reign	Ruling part	Consort	Death	Notes
Humbert I the White-Handed	c.980 Maurienne; Son of Amadeus, Count of Belley	1003 – 19 July 1048	County of Savoy	Ancilla c. 995/1000 four children	19 July 1048; Hermillon aged 67–68	First known member of the family and first owner of the county.
Amadeus I of the Tail	c.1016 First son of Humbert I and Ancilla	1048 – 1052	County of Savoy	Adila; 1030 three children	c.1052 aged 35–36	Known by this nickname after appearing before Henry III, Holy Roman Emperor at Verona with a large "tail" of knights and vassals. Left no surviving descendants, beside his son, Aymon, and a daughter who became Countess of Geneva. He was succeeded by his brother.
Otto	c.1020 Charbonnières Castle; Fourth son of Humbert I and Ancilla	1052 – 1057	County of Savoy	Adelaide the Great, Marchioness of Turin; 1046 five children	c.1057 Turin aged 36–37	Through his marriage with Adelaide, their descendants eventually inherited the important March of Turin.
Adelaide of Turin the Great	c.1020 Turin; Daughter of Ulric Manfred II, Marquis of Turin and Bertha of Milan	1057 – 19 December 1091	County of Savoy (with the March of Turin)	Herman IV, Duke of Swabia; 1036 no children Henry, Marquis of Montferrat; 1041 no children Otto; 1046 five children	19 December 1091; Canischio aged 36–37	Initially as regent for her children, she quickly took over the control of the County of Savoy, which ruled alongside her descendants until her death. She was also ruling, since 1034, the March of Turin. In 1078, Adelaide's co-rulers divided her possessions: her granddaughter Agnes and her husband co-ruled with her in Turin, while her second son Amadeus followed (also with her) in Savoy proper. After her death, Turin merged in Savoy.
Peter I	c. 1048; First son of Otto and Adelaide	1057 – 9 July 1078	County of Savoy (with the March of Turin)	Agnes of Aquitaine; 1064 two children	9 July 1078 aged 29–30	Initially as regent for her children, she quickly took over the control of the County of Savoy, which ruled alongside her descendants until her death. She was also ruling, since 1034, the March of Turin. In 1078, Adelaide's co-rulers divided her possessions: her granddaughter Agnes and her husband co-ruled with her in Turin, while her second son Amadeus followed (also with her) in Savoy proper. After her death, Turin merged in Savoy.
Amadeus II	c. 1050; Second son of Otto and Adelaide	9 July 1078 – 26 January 1080	County of Savoy (in co-rulership)	Joan of Geneva c. 1065 four children	26 January 1080 aged 29–30	Initially as regent for her children, she quickly took over the control of the County of Savoy, which ruled alongside her descendants until her death. She was also ruling, since 1034, the March of Turin. In 1078, Adelaide's co-rulers divided her possessions: her granddaughter Agnes and her husband co-ruled with her in Turin, while her second son Amadeus followed (also with her) in Savoy proper. After her death, Turin merged in Savoy.
Agnes	c.1070 Daughter of Peter I and Agnes of Aquitaine	9 July 1078 – 29 June 1091	March of Turin (in co-rulership)	1080 two children	c.1115 aged 44–45	Initially as regent for her children, she quickly took over the control of the County of Savoy, which ruled alongside her descendants until her death. She was also ruling, since 1034, the March of Turin. In 1078, Adelaide's co-rulers divided her possessions: her granddaughter Agnes and her husband co-ruled with her in Turin, while her second son Amadeus followed (also with her) in Savoy proper. After her death, Turin merged in Savoy.
Frederick of Montbéliard	c.1045 Bar-le-Duc; Son of Louis de Montbéliard and Sophie, Countess of Bar	9 July 1078 – 29 June 1091	March of Turin (in co-rulership)	1080 two children	29 June 1091; Turin aged 45–46	Initially as regent for her children, she quickly took over the control of the County of Savoy, which ruled alongside her descendants until her death. She was also ruling, since 1034, the March of Turin. In 1078, Adelaide's co-rulers divided her possessions: her granddaughter Agnes and her husband co-ruled with her in Turin, while her second son Amadeus followed (also with her) in Savoy proper. After her death, Turin merged in Savoy.
Humbert II the Reinforced (Note: Alternatively nicknamed the Fat.)	c. 1065; Carignano; Son of Amadeus II and Joan of Geneva	26 January 1080 – 14 October 1103	County of Savoy	Gisela of Burgundy; 1090 seven children	14 October 1103; Moûtiers aged 37–38	Co-ruled with his grandmother until 1091. His nickname may be explained by his unusual height.
Regency of Gisela of Burgundy, Conon, Bishop of Maurienne, Aymon I, Count of Geneva and Guy de Miribel (1103-1109)						
Amadeus III the Crusader	c. 1095; Carignano; Son of Humbert II and Gisela of Burgundy	14 October 1103 – 30 March 1148	County of Savoy	Adelaide; 1120/23 no children Mahaut of Albon; July 1134/1135 ten children	30 March 1148; Nicosia aged 52–53	
Regency of Amadeus, Bishop of Lausanne (1148-1150)						Children of Amadeus III, divided their inheritance. Alix's properties were eventually inherited by her own descendants.
Humbert III the Blessed	4 August 1136; Avigliana; Son of Amadeus III and Mahaut of Albon	30 March 1148 – 4 March 1189	County of Savoy	Faidiva of Toulouse c. 1151 no children Gertrude of Flanders; 1155 no children Clementia of Zähringen; 1164 two children Beatrice of Viennois; 1175/77 one child	4 March 1189; Chambéry aged 52	Children of Amadeus III, divided their inheritance. Alix's properties were eventually inherited by her own descendants.
Alix	1123; Daughter of Amadeus III and Adelaide	30 March 1148 – c.1160	County of Savoy (at Châteauneuf-en-Valromey, Virieu-le-Grand and Cordon-en-Bugey)	Humbert III, Lord of Beaujeu; 1140 five children	c.1160 aged 36–37?	Children of Amadeus III, divided their inheritance. Alix's properties were eventually inherited by her own descendants.
Regency of Beatrice of Viennois and Boniface I, Marquis of Montferrat (1189-1191)						
Thomas I the Friend of the Communes (Note: Alternatively nicknamed the Ghibelline.)	27 May 1178; Aiguebelle; Son of Humbert III and Beatrice of Viennois	4 March 1189 – 1 March 1233	County of Savoy	Margaret of Geneva; May 1196 fourteen children	1 March 1233; Moncalieri aged 54	
Amadeus IV	1197; Montmélian; First son of Thomas I and Margaret of Geneva	1 March 1233 – 24 June 1253	County of Savoy (at Savoy proper)	Margaret of Burgundy c 1217 two children Cecile of Baux, Passerose; 1244 four children	24 June 1253; Montmélian aged 55–56	Children of Thomas I, divided their inheritance. Amadeus was the first in the family to call himself Count of Savoy . In 1239, Amadeus gave the lordships of Saint-Maurice and Monthey to his sister Margaret, which may have returned to Savoy after her death. The same may have happened to the properties of Aymon, who died with no descendants. Through marriage, Thomas II became also Count of Flanders. As with Peter, after his nephew's death with no descendants, he inherited the county of Savoy as a separate possession of his original barony, as both were inherited by different individuals after his own death.
Aymon	c.1200 Montmélian; Third son of Thomas I and Margaret of Geneva	1 March 1233 – 30 August 1237	County of Savoy (at Agaune, Chablais, Chillon, Morges and Villeneuve)	Unmarried	30 August 1237; Montmélian aged 36–37	
Margaret	1212; Daughter of Thomas I and Margaret of Geneva	1239 – September 1273	County of Savoy (at Saint-Maurice and Monthey)	Hartmann IV, Count of Kyburg; 1 June 1218; Moudon no children Eberhard I, Count of Habsburg-Laufenburg; November 1264 no children	September 1273 aged 60–61	
Thomas II	1199; Montmélian; Fifth son of Thomas I and Margaret of Geneva	1 March 1233 – 7 February 1259	Lordship of Piedmont	Joan, Countess of Flanders; 2 April 1237 no children Beatrice Fieschi; 1251 six children	7 February 1259; Chambéry aged 21–22	
Peter II the Little Charlemagne	1203; Susa; Seventh son of Thomas I and Margaret of Geneva	1 March 1233 – 15 May 1268	Barony of Vaud	Agnes, Lady of Faucigny; 1236 one child	15 May 1268; Château de Chillon or Pierre-Châtel aged 64–65	
Peter II the Little Charlemagne	1203; Susa; Seventh son of Thomas I and Margaret of Geneva	June 1263 – 15 May 1268	County of Savoy	Agnes, Lady of Faucigny; 1236 one child	15 May 1268; Château de Chillon or Pierre-Châtel aged 64–65	
Regency of Cecile of Baux (1253-1260) and Thomas II, Lord of Piedmont (1253-1259)						Mortally wounded, died with no descendants. The county was inherited by his uncle Peter (then baron of Vaud).
Boniface	December 1244; Chambéry; Son of Amadeus IV and Cecile of Baux	24 June 1253 – June 1263	County of Savoy	Unmarried	June 1263; Turin aged 18	Mortally wounded, died with no descendants. The county was inherited by his uncle Peter (then baron of Vaud).
Thomas III	1246; First son of Thomas II and Beatrice Fieschi	7 February 1259 – 16 May 1282	Lordship of Piedmont	Guyonne of Burgundy (d.1316); May 1274 five children	16 May 1282; Saint-Genix-sur-Guiers aged 37–38	
Philip I	1207; Aiguebelle; Eighth son of Thomas I and Margaret of Geneva	15 May 1268 – 15 August 1285	County of Savoy (with Barony of Vaud from 1271)	Adelaide, Countess of Burgundy; 12 June 1267 no issue	16 August 1285; Roussillon aged 78	Heirs of Peter II, redivided the inheritance. Beatrice abdicated of her father's barony to her uncle Philip, which determined the (brief) re-absorption of Vaud into her uncle's county of Savoy. She kept, however, her mother's lordship of Faucigny until her death, after which it passed to her descendants. Philip was the last count of the main line of Savoyard counts; after his own death also with no children, the county was inherited by the Piedmont branch.
Beatrice	1237; Daughter of Peter II and Agnes, Lady of Faucigny	15 May 1268 – April 1310	Barony of Vaud (with Lordship of Faucigny; in Faucigny only since 1271)	Guigues VII, Dauphin of Viennois; April 1253 three children Gaston VII, Viscount of Béarn; 2 April 1273 no children	April 1310; Faucigny aged 72–73	Heirs of Peter II, redivided the inheritance. Beatrice abdicated of her father's barony to her uncle Philip, which determined the (brief) re-absorption of Vaud into her uncle's county of Savoy. She kept, however, her mother's lordship of Faucigny until her death, after which it passed to her descendants. Philip was the last count of the main line of Savoyard counts; after his own death also with no children, the county was inherited by the Piedmont branch.
Vaud returned (briefly) to Savoy; Faucigny inherited by the Dauphiné of Viennois
Regency of Guyonne of Burgundy and Otto IV, Count of Burgundy (1282-1292), with Adhémar of Roussillon, Archbishop of Lyon (1282-1283)						
Philip	1278; Susa; Son of Thomas III and Guyonne of Burgundy	16 May 1282 – 25 September 1334	Lordship of Piedmont	Isabella of Villehardouin, Princess of Achaea; 12 February 1301; Rome three children Catherine de la Tour du Pin; 1312 eleven children	25 September 1334; Pinerolo aged 55–56	
Amadeus V the Great	1252; Le Bourget-du-Lac; Second son of Thomas II, Lord of Piedmont and Beatrice Fieschi	15 August 1285 – 16 October 1323	County of Savoy	Sybille of Bâgé; 5 July 1272 eight children Marie of Brabant; 1297 four children	16 October 1323; Avignon aged 73–74	Heirs of their uncle Philip I of Savoy, divided the gained inheritance.
Louis I	1253; Third son of Thomas II, Lord of Piedmont and Beatrice Fieschi	15 August 1285 – 13 January 1302	Barony of Vaud	Adeline of Lorraine (1245–1278) c.1270 one child Jeanne of Montfort-Chambéon; 1283 eleven children Isabelle d'Aulnay (1270-30 October 1341); 1 May 1301 no children	13 January 1302; Naples aged 48–49	Heirs of their uncle Philip I of Savoy, divided the gained inheritance.
Louis II	1283; Son of Louis I and Jeanne of Montfort-Chambéon	13 January 1302 – February 1349	Barony of Vaud	Isabelle de Chalon-Arlay (d.1359); 1309 three children	February 1349 aged 48–49	
Edward the Liberal	8 February 1284; Baugé; Second son of Amadeus V and Sybille of Bâgé	16 October 1323 – 4 November 1329	County of Savoy	Blanche of Burgundy; 18 October 1307; Château de Montbard one daughter	4 November 1329; Gentilly aged 45	Left no male descendants. He was succeeded by his brother.
Aymon the Peaceful	15 December 1291; Chambéry; Third son of Amadeus V and Sybille of Bâgé	4 November 1329 – 22 June 1343	County of Savoy	Yolande Palaeologina of Montferrat; 1 May 1330; Casale five children	22 June 1343; Montmélian aged 51	During his reign, he had his rule contested by his niece: Joan of Savoy, daughter of Edward and Blanche of Burgundy. She had the support of her husband, John III, Duke of Brittany. By agreement, settled by John II of France, on 22 November 1339, she renounced her rights of succession in return for an annual income of 6,000 livres.
James	January 1315; Pinerolo; Son of Philip and Catherine de la Tour du Pin	25 September 1334 – 17 May 1367	Lordship of Piedmont	Beatrice d'Este (d.1339); 1338 no children Sibylle de Baux (d.1361); 9 June 1339 one child Margaret of Beaujeu; 16 July 1362 two children	17 May 1367; Pinerolo aged 52	
Regency of Louis II, Baron of Vaud and Amadeus III, Count of Geneva (1343-1349)						
Amadeus VI the Green	4 January 1334; Chambéry; Son of Aymon and Yolande Palaeologina of Montferrat	22 June 1343 – 1 March 1383	County of Savoy	Bonne of Bourbon; 1355; Paris two children	1 March 1383; Naples aged 49	
Catherine	1324; Daughter of Louis II and Isabelle de Chalon-Arlay	February 1349 – 1359	Barony of Vaud	Azzone Visconti; 1331 one child Raoul II of Brienne, Count of Eu; 1340 no children William I, Marquis of Namur; March 1352 three children	18 June 1388 aged 63–64	In 1359, indebted, she sold the barony to the Count of Savoy, who united Vaud to the rest of the Savoyard possessions.
Vaud re-merged in Savoy
Regency of Margaret of Beaujeu (1367-1377)						In the beginning of his rule, his mother's regency was contested by a pretender: Philip (II) of Piedmont (1367–1368), son of James and Sibylle de Baux, was the original heir, but was disinherited by his father, after warring with his cousin, Amadeus VI, Count of Savoy. He fought Margaret, who sought for help from the Count of Savoy. Amadeus VI captured the rebel in Fossano in 1368.; Amadeus of Piedmont left no male heirs, and was succeeded by his brother Louis.
Amadeus	1363; Pinerolo; First son of James and Margaret of Beaujeu	17 May 1367 – 7 May 1402	Lordship of Piedmont	Catherine of Geneva; 22 September 1380; Duingt Castle four children	7 May 1402; Pinerolo aged 38–39	In the beginning of his rule, his mother's regency was contested by a pretender: Philip (II) of Piedmont (1367–1368), son of James and Sibylle de Baux, was the original heir, but was disinherited by his father, after warring with his cousin, Amadeus VI, Count of Savoy. He fought Margaret, who sought for help from the Count of Savoy. Amadeus VI captured the rebel in Fossano in 1368.; Amadeus of Piedmont left no male heirs, and was succeeded by his brother Louis.
Regency of Bonne of Bourbon (1383-1384)						
Amadeus VII the Red	24 February 1360; Avigliana; Son of Amadeus VI and Bonne of Bourbon	1 March 1383 – 1 November 1391	County of Savoy	Bonne of Berry; 18 January 1377; Paris three children	1 November 1391; Château de Ripaille aged 31	
Regency of Bonne of Bourbon and Odon de Villars (1391-1398)						Abdicated in 1440 to join clergy. Between 1439 and 1449, he was also Antipope Felix V.
Amadeus VIII the Peaceful	4 September 1383; Chambéry; Son of Amadeus VII and Bonne of Berry	1 November 1391 – 6 January 1440	County of Savoy (until 1416) Duchy of Savoy (from 1416)	Mary of Burgundy; 11 November 1386; Sluis nine children	7 January 1451; Château de Ripaille aged 67	Abdicated in 1440 to join clergy. Between 1439 and 1449, he was also Antipope Felix V.
Louis	1364; Pinerolo; Second son of James and Margaret of Beaujeu	7 May 1402 – 11 December 1418	Lordship of Piedmont	Bona of Savoy; 24 January 1403 no children	11 December 1418; Pinerolo aged 53–54	Founded, in 1405, the University of Turin. Left no legitimate male heirs. After his death Piedmont reverted to Savoy.
Piedmont annexed to Savoy
Louis the Generous	21 February 1413; Geneva; Fourth son of Amadeus VIII and Mary of Burgundy	6 January 1440 – 29 January 1465	Duchy of Savoy (at Savoy proper)	Anne of Cyprus; 1 November 1433 (or 12 February 1434); Chambéry seventeen children	29 January 1465; Lyon aged 51	Children of Amadeus VIII, divided their inheritance. After Philip's death Geneva returned to Savoy.
Philip	1417; Château de Ripaille; Fifth son of Amadeus VIII and Mary of Burgundy	6 January 1440 – 3 March 1444	Duchy of Savoy (at Geneva)	Unmarried	3 March 1444; Annecy aged 67	Children of Amadeus VIII, divided their inheritance. After Philip's death Geneva returned to Savoy.
Amadeus IX the Saint	1 February 1435; Thonon-les-Bains; First son of Louis and Anne of Cyprus	29 January 1465 – 30 March 1472	Duchy of Savoy (at Savoy proper)	Yolande of Valois; 1452 ten children	30 March 1472; Vercelli aged 37	Children of Louis, divided their inheritance. Louis became King of Cyprus jure uxoris in 1459. In 1476, Jacques returned his barony to the main duchy.
Louis	5 June 1436; Geneva; Second son of Louis and Anne of Cyprus	29 January 1465 – August 1482	County of Geneva	Annabella of Scotland; 14 December 1444; Stirling Castle no children Charlotte, Queen of Cyprus; 7 October 1459 one child	August 1482; Ripaille aged 46	Children of Louis, divided their inheritance. Louis became King of Cyprus jure uxoris in 1459. In 1476, Jacques returned his barony to the main duchy.
Jacques	12 November 1450; Geneva; Ninth son of Louis and Anne of Cyprus	29 January 1465 – 1476	Duchy of Savoy (at Vaud)	Marie I, Countess of Saint-Pol and Soissons; 1484 one child	30 June 1486; Château de Ham aged 67	Children of Louis, divided their inheritance. Louis became King of Cyprus jure uxoris in 1459. In 1476, Jacques returned his barony to the main duchy.
Regency of Yolande of Valois (1472-1479)						
Philibert I the Hunter	17 August 1465; Chambéry; Third son of Amadeus IX and Yolande of Valois	30 March 1472 – 22 September 1482	Duchy of Savoy	Bianca Maria Sforza; January 1474 no children	22 September 1482; Lyon aged 17	
Janus	8 November 1440; Geneva; Fifth son of Louis and Anne of Cyprus	August 1482 – 22 December 1491	County of Geneva	Helena of Luxembourg (d.1488)1465 one child Madeleine de de Brosse; 1488 no children	22 December 1491; Annecy aged 51	Brother of Louis. Left no male descendants. Geneva returned to Savoy.
Geneva returned to Savoy
Charles I the Warrior	28 March 1468; Carignano; Fifth son of Amadeus IX and Yolande of Valois	22 September 1482 – 13 March 1490	Duchy of Savoy	Blanche of Montferrat; 1 April 1485 two children	13 March 1490; Pinerolo aged 21	
Regency of Blanche of Montferrat (1490-1496)						Died as a child. Despite his sister being the heiress, the Duchy passed to his uncle Philip.
Charles II the Child	23 June 1489; Turin; Son of Charles I and Blanche of Montferrat	13 March 1490 – 16 April 1496	Duchy of Savoy	Unmarried	16 April 1496; Moncalieri aged 6	Died as a child. Despite his sister being the heiress, the Duchy passed to his uncle Philip.
Philip II the Landless	4 February 1438; Chambéry; Fifth son of Louis and Anne of Cyprus	16 April 1496 – 7 November 1497	Duchy of Savoy	Marguerite de Bourbon; 6 April 1472; Moulins three children Claudine de Brosse; 11 November 1485; Moulins six children	7 November 1497; Chambéry aged 59	
Philibert II the Handsome (Note: Alternatively nicknamed the Good.)	10 April 1480; Pont-d'Ain; Son of Philip II and Margaret of Bourbon	7 November 1497 – 10 September 1504	Duchy of Savoy	Yolande Louise of Savoy; 1496 no children Margaret of Austria; 2 December 1501; Romainmôtier no children	10 September 1504; Pont-d'Ain aged 24	
Charles III the Good	10 October 1486; Chazey-sur-Ain; First son of Philip II and Claudine de Brosse	10 September 1504 – 17 August 1553	Duchy of Savoy	Beatrice of Portugal; 29 September 1521; Villefranche-sur-Mer nine children	17 August 1553; Vercelli aged 66	Brothers and sisters of Philibert II, expanded the Savoyard domain. Philiberta, as widow of the Duke of Nemours, inherited this duchy and passed it to her sister Louise, who adicated to her brother Philip. Charles gave to his brother Philip the County of Geneva, to which he annexed also the Duchy of Nemours. In contrast, Savoy itself lost some important lands. Vaud, for example, was sold to Switzerland in 1536.
Philip	1490; Bourg-en-Bresse; Third son of Philip II and Claudine de Brosse	14 August 1514 – 25 November 1533	County of Geneva (with Duchy of Nemours since 1528)	Charlotte of Orléans-Longueville (1512–1549); October 1528 two children	25 November 1533; Marseille aged 66	Brothers and sisters of Philibert II, expanded the Savoyard domain. Philiberta, as widow of the Duke of Nemours, inherited this duchy and passed it to her sister Louise, who adicated to her brother Philip. Charles gave to his brother Philip the County of Geneva, to which he annexed also the Duchy of Nemours. In contrast, Savoy itself lost some important lands. Vaud, for example, was sold to Switzerland in 1536.
Philiberta	1487; Daughter of Philip II and Claudine de Brosse	17 March 1516 – 4 April 1524	Duchy of Nemours	Giuliano de' Medici, Duke of Nemours; 22 February 1515; Paris no children	4 April 1524; Virieu aged 36–37	Brothers and sisters of Philibert II, expanded the Savoyard domain. Philiberta, as widow of the Duke of Nemours, inherited this duchy and passed it to her sister Louise, who adicated to her brother Philip. Charles gave to his brother Philip the County of Geneva, to which he annexed also the Duchy of Nemours. In contrast, Savoy itself lost some important lands. Vaud, for example, was sold to Switzerland in 1536.
Louise	11 September 1476; Pont-d'Ain; Daughter of Philip II and Margaret of Bourbon	4 April 1524 – 22 December 1528	Duchy of Nemours	Charles, Count of Angoulême; 16 February 1488; Paris two children	22 September 1531; Grez-sur-Loing aged 55	Brothers and sisters of Philibert II, expanded the Savoyard domain. Philiberta, as widow of the Duke of Nemours, inherited this duchy and passed it to her sister Louise, who adicated to her brother Philip. Charles gave to his brother Philip the County of Geneva, to which he annexed also the Duchy of Nemours. In contrast, Savoy itself lost some important lands. Vaud, for example, was sold to Switzerland in 1536.
Regency of Charlotte of Orléans-Longueville (1533-1549)						
Jacques	12 October 1531; Vauluisant; Son of Philip and Charlotte of Orléans-Longueville	25 November 1533 – 18 June 1585	County of Geneva (with Duchy of Nemours)	Anna d'Este; 29 April 1566 four children	18 June 1585; Annecy aged 53	
Emmanuel Philibert the Iron-headed	8 July 1528; Chambéry; Son of Charles III and Beatrice of Portugal	17 August 1553 – 30 August 1580	Duchy of Savoy	Margaret of France; 9 July 1559; Saint-Paul's Church, Paris one child	30 August 1580; Turin aged 52	
Charles Emmanuel I the Great (Note: Alternatively nicknamed The Hot-headed.)	12 January 1562; Castle of Rivoli; Son of Emmanuel Philibert and Margaret of France	30 August 1580 – 26 July 1630	Duchy of Savoy	Catalina Micaela of Spain; 18 March 1585; Zaragoza ten children	26 July 1630; Savigliano aged 68	
Charles Emmanuel	12 February 1567; Nanteuil-le-Haudouin; First son of Jacques and Anna d'Este	15 June 1585 – 13 August 1595	County of Geneva (with Duchy of Nemours)	Unmarried	13 August 1595; Annecy aged 28	
Henry I	2 November 1572; Paris; Second son of Jacques and Anna d'Este	13 August 1595 – 10 July 1632	County of Geneva (with Duchy of Nemours)	Anna of Lorraine-Aumale; 18 April 1618 four children	10 July 1632; Paris aged 59	Through his marriage, Henry inherits the Duchy of Aumale, which was recovered for her by France after being confiscated from her father.
Victor Amadeus I the Lion of Susa	8 May 1587; Turin; Second son of Charles Emmanuel I and Catalina Micaela of Spain	26 July 1630 – 7 October 1637	Duchy of Savoy	Christine Marie of France; 10 February 1619; Louvre Palace eight children	7 October 1637; Turin aged 50	Children of Charles Emmanuel, divided their inheritance.
Thomas Francis	21 December 1596; Turin; Fifth son of Charles Emmanuel I and Catalina Micaela of Spain	26 July 1630 – 22 January 1656	Principality of Carignano	Marie de Bourbon, Countess of Soissons; 14 April 1625; Paris seven children	22 January 1656; Turin aged 59	Children of Charles Emmanuel, divided their inheritance.
Louis I	1615; Paris; First son of Henry I and Anna of Lorraine-Aumale	10 July 1632 – 16 September 1641	County of Geneva (with Duchy of Nemours)	Unmarried	16 September 1641; Aire-sur-la-Lys aged 20–21	Left no children. The inheritance passed to his brother.
Regency of Christine Marie of France (1637-1638)						Died as a child. He was succeeded by his brother.
Francis Hyacinth	14 September 1632; Castello del Valentino; Second son of Victor Amadeus I and Christine Marie of France	7 October 1637 – 4 October 1638	Duchy of Savoy	Unmarried	4 October 1638; Castello del Valentino aged 6	Died as a child. He was succeeded by his brother.
Regency of Christine Marie of France (1638-1663)						
Charles Emmanuel II	20 June 1634; Turin; Third son of Victor Amadeus I and Christine Marie of France	4 October 1638 – 12 June 1675	Duchy of Savoy	Françoise Madeleine d'Orléans; 4 March 1663; Louvre Palace no children Marie Jeanne, Countess of Geneva; 10 May 1665; Turin one child	12 June 1675; Turin aged 40	
Charles Amadeus	12 April 1624; Paris; Second son of Henry I and Anna of Lorraine-Aumale	16 September 1641 – 30 July 1652	County of Geneva (with Duchy of Nemours)	Élisabeth de Bourbon; 11 July 1643; Louvre Palace six children	30 July 1652; Paris aged 28	Left no male children. The inheritance passed to his brother.
Henry II	7 November 1625; Paris; Third son of Henry I and Anna of Lorraine-Aumale	30 July 1652 – 4 January 1659	County of Geneva (with Duchy of Nemours)	Marie of Orléans-Longueville; 22 May 1657; Trie no children	4 January 1659; Paris aged 33	Left the ecclesiastical career (and his post as Archbishop of Reims) to succeed his brother. Henry left no children. After his death, Geneva was inherited by his niece, succession not recognized in Nemours, which led to its annexation to France.
Nemours annexed to France
Emmanuel Philibert the Mute	20 August 1628; Moûtiers; First son of Thomas Francis and Marie de Bourbon, Countess of Soissons	22 January 1656 – 23 April 1709	Principality of Carignano	Maria Caterina d'Este; 11 November 1684; Castle of Racconigi four children	23 April 1709; Palazzo Carignano aged 80	Children of Thomas Francis, divided their patrimony. Emmanuel inherited Carignano, and his brother Eugene the County of Soissons.
Eugene Maurice	2 March 1635; Chambéry; Fourth son of Thomas Francis and Marie de Bourbon, Countess of Soissons	22 January 1656 – 6 June 1673	County of Soissons	Olympia Mancini; 24 February 1657 eight children	6 June 1673; Unna aged 38	Children of Thomas Francis, divided their patrimony. Emmanuel inherited Carignano, and his brother Eugene the County of Soissons.
Marie Jeanne	11 April 1644; Paris; Daughter of Charles Amadeus and Élisabeth de Bourbon	4 January 1659 – 15 March 1724	County of Geneva	Charles Emmanuel II; 10 May 1665; Turin one child	15 March 1724; Palazzo Madama, Turin aged 79	Heir of Geneva, Aumale and other territories but not of Nemours, annexed to France. In 1686, she sold Aumale to Louis Auguste de Bourbon. The county of Geneva passed to her son, the Duke of Savoy.
Geneva inherited by Savoy
Louis Thomas	15 December 1657; Paris; Son of Eugene Maurice and Olympia Mancini	6 June 1673 – 14 August 1702	County of Soissons	Uranie de la Cropte de Beauvais (1655–1717); 24 February 1657 six children	14 August 1702 near Landau aged 44	
Regency of Marie Jeanne, Countess of Geneva (1675-1684)						In 1720, he conquered the island-kingdom of Sardinia, but ruled it from Turin.
Victor Amadeus II	14 May 1666; Turin; Son of Charles Emmanuel II and Marie Jeanne, Countess of Geneva	12 June 1675 – 17 February 1720 17 February 1720 – 3 September 1730	Duchy of Savoy Kingdom of Sardinia	Anne Marie d'Orléans; 10 April 1684; Versailles six children Anna Canalis di Cumiana; 12 August 1730; Chapel of the Holy Shroud (morganatic) no children	31 October 1732; Castle of Rivoli aged 66	In 1720, he conquered the island-kingdom of Sardinia, but ruled it from Turin.
Thomas Emmanuel	8 December 1687; Paris; Fourth son of Thomas Francis and Marie de Bourbon, Countess of Soissons	14 August 1702 – 28 December 1729	County of Soissons	Maria Theresia of Liechtenstein, Duchess of Opava; 24 October 1713; Vienna one child	28 December 1729; Vienna aged 42	
Victor Amadeus I	1 March 1690; Turin; Son of Emmanuel Philibert and Maria Caterina d'Este	23 April 1709 – 4 April 1741	Principality of Carignano	Maria Vittoria of Savoy; 7 November 1714; Moncalieri Castle five children	4 April 1741; Turin aged 51	
Regency of Princess Maria Theresia of Liechtenstein (1729-1732)						After his death with no descendants, Soissons returned to the Crown of France.
Eugene John	23 September 1714; Vienna; Son of Thomas Emmanuel and Maria Theresia of Liechtenstein	28 December 1729 – 23 November 1734	County of Soissons	Unmarried	23 November 1734; Mannheim aged 20	After his death with no descendants, Soissons returned to the Crown of France.
Soissons annexed to France
Charles Emmanuel III	27 April 1701; Turin; Son of Victor Amadeus II and Anne Marie d'Orléans	3 September 1730 – 20 February 1773	Kingdom of Sardinia	Anne Christine of Sulzbach; 15 March 1722 one child Polyxena of Hesse-Rotenburg; 20 August 1724 six children Elisabeth Therese of Lorraine; 5 March 1737 three children	20 February 1773; Turin aged 72	
Louis Victor	25 September 1721; Hôtel de Soissons; Son of Victor Amadeus I and Maria Vittoria of Savoy	4 April 1741 – 16 December 1778	Principality of Carignano	Christine Henriette of Hesse-Rotenburg; 12 April 1842; Palazzina di Caccia di Stupinigi eight children	16 December 1778; Palazzo Carignano aged 57	
Victor Amadeus III	26 June 1726; Turin; Son of Charles Emmanuel III and Polyxena of Hesse-Rotenburg	20 February 1773 – 16 October 1796	Kingdom of Sardinia	Maria Antonia of Spain; 31 May 1750 twelve children	16 October 1796; Moncalieri aged 70	
Victor Amadeus II	31 October 1743; Palazzo Carignano; Son of Louis Victor and Christine Henriette of Hesse-Rotenburg	16 December 1778 – 10 September 1780	Principality of Carignano	Joséphine of Lorraine; 18 October 1768; Oulx one child	10 September 1780; Turin aged 36	
Regency of Joséphine of Lorraine (1780-1788)						
Charles Emmanuel	24 October 1770; Palazzo Carignano; Son of Victor Amadeus II and Joséphine of Lorraine	10 September 1780 – 16 August 1800	Principality of Carignano	Maria Christina of Saxony; 24 October 1797; Turin two children	16 August 1800; Paris aged 29	
Charles Emmanuel IV	24 May 1751; Turin; First son of Victor Amadeus III and Maria Antonia of Spain	16 October 1796 – 4 June 1802	Kingdom of Sardinia	Clotilde of France; 27 August 1775 no children	6 October 1819; Rome aged 68	Left no children. He was succeeded by his brother.
Victor Emmanuel I	24 July 1759; Turin; Third son of Victor Amadeus III and Maria Antonia of Spain	4 June 1802 – 12 March 1821	Kingdom of Sardinia	Maria Teresa of Austria-Este; 21 April 1789 seven children	10 January 1824; Moncalieri aged 65	Left no children. He was succeeded by his brother.
Charles Felix	6 April 1765; Turin; Fifth son of Victor Amadeus III and Maria Antonia of Spain	12 March 1821 – 27 April 1831	Kingdom of Sardinia	Maria Cristina of Naples and Sicily; 7 March 1807 no children	27 April 1831; Turin aged 66	Left no children. He was succeeded by his cousin.
Regency of Maria Christina of Saxony (1800-1816)						After his cousin's death with no descendants, the Carignano branch inherited the main Kingdom of Sardinia.
Charles Albert	2 October 1798; Turin; Son of Charles Emmanuel, Prince of Carignano and Maria Christina of Saxony	16 August 1800 – 27 April 1831	Principality of Carignano	Maria Theresa of Austria; 30 September 1817; Florence three children	28 July 1849; Porto aged 50	After his cousin's death with no descendants, the Carignano branch inherited the main Kingdom of Sardinia.
Charles Albert	2 October 1798; Turin; Son of Charles Emmanuel, Prince of Carignano and Maria Christina of Saxony	27 April 1831 – 23 March 1849	Kingdom of Sardinia (Carignano branch)	Maria Theresa of Austria; 30 September 1817; Florence three children	28 July 1849; Porto aged 50	After his cousin's death with no descendants, the Carignano branch inherited the main Kingdom of Sardinia.
Victor Emmanuel II the Gallant	14 March 1820; Palazzo Carignano; Son of Charles Albert and Maria Theresa of Austria	23 March 1849 – 17 March 1861 17 March 1861 – 9 January 1878	Kingdom of Sardinia (Carignano branch) Kingdom of Italy	Adelaide of Austria; 12 April 1842; Palazzina di Caccia di Stupinigi eight children Rosa Vercellana; 18 October 1869; Pisa (morganatic) two children	9 January 1878; Quirinal Palace aged 57	Acquired land in Lombardy–Venetia and the Papal States, uniting most of the Italian Peninsula.
Umberto I the Good	14 March 1844; Turin; Son of Victor Emmanuel II and Adelaide of Austria	9 January 1878 – 29 July 1900	Kingdom of Italy	Margherita of Savoy; 22 April 1868; Turin one child	29 July 1900; Monza aged 56	Acquired land in modern-day Eritrea and Somalia, being the first Italian King to have a colonial empire. Died assassinated.
Victor Emmanuel III	11 November 1869; Naples; Son of Umberto I and Margherita of Savoy	29 July 1900 – 9 May 1946	Kingdom of Italy	Elena of Montenegro; 21 October 1896; Bari five children	28 December 1947; Alexandria aged 78	Acquired land in Libya, South Tyrol, and the Istria during World War I. Reigned during the Fascist Period, while also gaining a bit more land in Libya and occupied Ethiopia. He reigned during World War II, in which he surrendered to the Allies. Abdicated in favor of his son, Umberto in 1946 before departing to Egypt.
Umberto II the May King	15 September 1904; Racconigi; Son of Victor Emmanuel III and Elena of Montenegro	9 May – 12 June 1946	Kingdom of Italy	Marie-José of Belgium the May Queen; 8 January 1930; Quirinal Palace four children	18 March 1983; Geneva aged 78	The last King of Italy. On 2 June, the Italians voted for a Republic, and the Monarchy was abolished on 12 June.

== Pretenders to the throne ==
Name	Photo	Birth	Death	Became Head	Ceased to be Head
Umberto II		15 September 1904	18 March 1983	9 May 1946	18 March 1983

=== Disputed Claimants ===
After the death of Umberto II in 1983, Prince Vittorio Emanuele succeeded him. On 7 July 2006, Amadeo claimed that Vittorio Emanuel had lost his royal rights when he married without Umberto II's permission in 1971, in which Amadeo declared himself the Head of the Royal House on the same day.

==== Descendants of Umberto II ====
Name	Photo	Birth	Death	Became Head	Ceased to be Head
Vittorio Emanuele		12 February 1937	3 February 2024	18 March 1983	3 February 2024
Emanuele Filiberto		22 June 1972	Still living	3 February 2024	Still claims the throne

==== Descendants of Amadeo I of Spain ====
Name	Photo	Birth	Death	Became Head	Ceased to be Head
Prince Amedeo		27 September 1943	1 June 2021	7 July 2006	1 June 2021
Prince Aimone		13 October 1967	Still living	1 June 2021	Still claims the throne

== See also ==
- House of Savoy
- History of Savoy
- List of Savoyard consorts
- County of Savoy
- Duchy of Savoy
- Kingdom of Sardinia
- List of Sardinian monarchs
- Kingdom of Italy
- King of Italy
- List of Italian royal consorts

== Bibliography ==
- Cox, Eugene L. (1967). The Green Count of Savoy. Princeton, New Jersey: Princeton University Press. LCCN 67-11030.
- Guichenon, Samuel (1660). "Noblesse romain". Histoire généalogique de la royale maison de Savoie ou Histoire généalogique de la royale maison de Savoie justifiée par titres, fondations de monastères, manuscrits, anciens monumens, histoires, et autres preuves authentiques (in French). Vol. I. Jean-Michel Briolo.
