= List of Savoyard consorts =

This is a list of consorts of the Savoyard monarchs.

== Countess of Savoy, 1003–1416 ==
Picture	Name	Father	Birth	Marriage	Became Countess	Ceased to be Countess	Death	Spouse
	Ancilla of Aosta/Lenzburg/Nyon	rettore laico dell'abbazia di Saint-Maurice d'Agaune or Arnold von Schannis, master of ceremonies of Burgundy or Anselmo di Nyon	974, if she was daughter of Arnold	995/1000	1003 husband's accession	1047–1051 husband's death	-	Humbert I
	Adila	-	-	1030	1047–1051 husband's accession	1051–1056 husband's death	-	Amadeus I
	Adelaide of Susa, Marchioness of Turin	Ulric Manfred II of Turin (Arduinici)	1014/20	1046	1051–1056 husband's accession	1057–1060 husband's death	19 December 1091	Otto
	Agnes of Aquitaine	William VII, Duke of Aquitaine (Ramnulfids)	1052	1064		9 July 1078 husband's death	after 18 June 1089	Peter I
	Joan of Geneva	Gérold II, Count of Geneva (Geneva)	-	1065/70		26 January 1080 husband's death	1095	Amadeus II
	Gisela of Burgundy	William I, Count of Burgundy (Ivrea)	1075	1090		19 October 1103 husband's death	May 1133	Humbert II
	Adelaide	-	-	1120/23		after July 1134		Amadeus III
	Mahaut of Albon	Guigues III, Count of Albon (Albon)	1112/16	July 1134/1135		after 30 March 1148		Amadeus III
	Faidiva of Toulouse	Alfonso I Jordan, Count of Toulouse (Rouergue)	-	before 3 January 1151		1154		Humbert III
	Gertrude of Flanders	Theodoric I, Count of Flanders (Metz)	1112/16	1155		before 1162 divorce	3 March, after 1186	Humbert III
	Clementia of Zähringen	Conrad I, Duke of Zähringen (Zähringen)	-	1164		1167/73/75		Humbert III
	Beatrice of Viennois	Gerard I, Count of Mâcon and Vienne (Ivrea)	1112/16	1175/77		4 March 1189 husband's death	8 April 1230	Humbert III
	Margaret of Geneva	William I, Count of Geneva (Geneva)	-	1195/6		1 March 1233 husband's death	8 April 1257	Thomas I
	Margaret (Anne) of Burgundy	Hugh III, Duke of Burgundy (Burgundy)	1192	before 1222	1 March 1233 husband's accession	1243		Amadeus IV
	Cecile of Baux	Barral of Baux (Baux)	-	18 December 1244		24 June 1253 husband's death	21 May 1275	Amadeus IV
	Agnes of Faucigny	Aymon II, Sire de Faucigny (Faucigny)	-	after 25 June 1236	7 June 1263 husband's accession	15 May 1268 husband's death	11 August 1268	Peter II
	Adelaide, Countess Palatine of Burgundy	Otto I, Duke of Merania (Andechs)	1209	11 June 1267	15 May 1268 husband's accession	8 March 1279		Philip I
	Sybille of Bâgé	Guy I Damas de Baugé, Baron of Couzan (Damas-Bâgé)	5 April/20 October 1255	5 July 1272	16 August 1285 husband's accession	28 February 1294		Amadeus V
	Marie of Brabant	John I, Duke of Brabant (Leuven)	1278/85	23 October 1297/1304		16 October 1323 husband's death	after 2 November 1338	Amadeus V
	Bianca of Burgundy	Robert II, Duke of Burgundy (Burgundy)	1288	18 October 1307	16 October 1323 husband's accession	4 November 1329 husband's death	27/28 July 1348	Edward
	Yolande Palaeologina of Montferrat	Theodore I Palaeologos, Marquess of Montferrat (Palaiologoi)	June 1318	1 May 1330		24 December 1342		Aimone
	Bonne of Bourbon	Peter I, Duke of Bourbon (Bourbon)	1341	September 1355		1 March 1383 husband's death	19 January 1402	Amadeus VI
	Bonne of Berry	John of France, Duke of Berry (Valois)	1362/1365	18 January 1377	1 March 1383 husband's accession	1 November 1391 husband's death	30 December 1435	Amadeus VII
	Mary of Burgundy	Philip the Bold (Valois-Burgundy)	September 1386	May 1401		1416 became Duchess	2 October 1422	Amadeus VIII

== Duchess of Savoy, 1416–1713 ==
Picture	Name	Father	Birth	Marriage	Became Duchess	Ceased to be Duchess	Death	Spouse
	Marie of Burgundy	Philip the Bold (Valois)	September 1386	May 1401	1416 became Duchess	2 October 1422		Amadeus VIII
	Anne of Cyprus	Janus of Cyprus (Lusignan)	24 September 1418	12 February 1434	7 November 1434 husband's accession	11 November 1462		Louis
	Yolande of France	Charles VII of France (Valois)	23 September 1434	1452	29 January 1465 husband's accession	30 March 1472 husband's death	23 August 1478	Amadeus IX
	Bianca Maria Sforza	Galeazzo Maria Sforza, Duke of Milan (Sforza)	5 April 1472	January 1474		22 September 1482 husband's death	31 December 1510	Philibert I
	Blanche Palaiologina of Montferrat	William VIII Palaiologos, Marquess of Montferrat (Palaiologoi)	1472	1 April 1485		13 March 1490 husband's death	30 March 1519	Charles I
	Claudine de Brosse	John II of Brosse (Brosse)	1450	11 November 1485	16 April 1496 husband's accession	7 November 1497 husband's death	13 October 1513	Philip II
	Yolande Louise of Savoy	Charles I, Duke of Savoy (Savoy)	2/11 July 1487	1496	7 November 1497 husband's accession	12/13 September 1499		Philibert II
	Margaret of Austria	Maximilian I, Holy Roman Emperor (Habsburg)	10 January 1480	2 December 1501		10 September 1504 husband's death	1 December 1530	Philibert II
	Beatrice of Portugal	Manuel I of Portugal (Aviz)	31 December 1504	29 September 1521		8 January 1538		Charles III
	Marguerite of France	Francis I of France (Valois)	5 June 1523	10 July 1559		15 September 1574		Emmanuel Philibert
	Catherine Michaela of Spain	Philip II of Spain (Habsburg)	10 October 1567	11 March 1585		6 November 1597		Charles Emmanuel I
	Christine of France	Henry IV of France (Bourbon)	10 February 1606	10 February 1619	26 July 1630 husband's accession	7 October 1637 husband's death	27 December 1663	Victor Amadeus I
	Françoise Madeleine d'Orléans	Gaston of France, Duke of Orléans (Orléans)	13 October 1648	4 March 1663		14 January 1664		Charles Emmanuel II
	Marie Jeanne of Savoy	Charles Amadeus of Savoy, Duke of Nemours (Savoy-Nemours)	11 April 1644	10 May 1665		12 June 1675 husband's death	15 March 1724	Charles Emmanuel II
	Anne Marie d'Orléans	Philippe of France, Duke of Orléans (Orléans)	27 August 1669	10 April 1684		11 April 1713 became Queen of Sicily	26 August 1728	Victor Amadeus II

As courtesy title

Picture	Name	Father	Birth	Marriage	Became Duchess	Ceased to be Duchess	Death	Spouse
	Infanta Maria Antonia Ferdinanda of Spain	Philip V of Spain (Bourbons of Spain)	17 November 1729	31 May 1750		20 February 1773 husband's accession	19 September 1785	Prince Victor Amadeus
	Archduchess Adelaide of Austria	Archduke Rainer Joseph of Austria (Habsburg-Lorraine)	3 June 1822	12 April 1842		23 March 1849 husband's accession	20 January 1855	Prince Victor Emmanuel

== Queen of Sardinia, 1720–1861 ==
Picture	Name	Father	Birth	Marriage	Became Queen	Ceased to be Queen	Death	Spouse
	Anne Marie d'Orléans	Philippe, Duke of Orléans (Orléans)	27 August 1669	10 April 1684	24 August 1720; Sardinia ceded to Savoy	26 August 1728		Victor Amadeus II
	Polyxena of Hesse-Rotenburg	Ernest Leopold, Landgrave of Hesse-Rotenburg (Hesse-Rotenburg)	21 September 1706	20 August 1724	3 September 1730 husband's ascession	13 January 1735		Charles Emmanuel III
	Elisabeth Therese of Lorraine	Leopold, Duke of Lorraine (Lorraine)	15 October 1711	1 April 1737		3 July 1741		Charles Emmanuel III
	Maria Antonia Ferdinanda of Spain	Philip V of Spain (Bourbons of Spain)	17 November 1729	31 May 1750	20 February 1773 husband's ascession	19 September 1785		Victor Amadeus III
	Clotilde of France	Louis, Dauphin of France (Bourbons of France)	23 September 1759	6 September/20 August 1775	14 October 1796 husband's ascession	7 March 1802		Charles Emmanuel IV
	Maria Teresa of Austria-Este	Archduke Ferdinand of Austria-Este (Austria-Este)	1 November 1773	25 April 1789	4 June 1802 husband's ascession	12 March 1821 husband's abdication	29 March 1832	Victor Emmanuel I
	Maria Cristina of Naples and Sicily	Ferdinand I of the Two Sicilies (Bourbons of the Two Sicilies)	17 January 1779	7 March 1807	12 March 1821 husband's ascession	27 April 1831 husband's death	11 March 1849	Charles Felix
	Maria Theresa of Tuscany	Ferdinand III, Grand Duke of Tuscany (Habsburg-Lorraine)	21 March 1801	30 September 1817	27 April 1831 husband's ascession	23 March 1849 husband's abdication	12 January 1855	Charles Albert
	Adelaide of Austria	Archduke Rainer Joseph of Austria (Habsburg-Lorraine)	3 June 1822	12 April 1842	23 March 1849 husband's ascession	20 January 1855		Victor Emmanuel II

Between 1859 and 1861 the Kingdom of Sardinia incorporated the majority of Italian states. On 17 March 1861 King Victor Emmanuel II was proclaimed King of Italy by the Parliament in Turin.

== Queen of Italy, 1861–1946 ==
Picture	Name	Arms	Father	Birth	Marriage	Became Consort	Ceased to be Consort	Death	Spouse
	Margherita of Savoy		Ferdinand, 1st Duke of Genoa (Savoy-Genoa)	20 November 1851	21 April 1868	9 January 1878 husband's accession	29 July 1900 husband's death	4 January 1926	Umberto I
	Elena of Montenegro		Nicholas I of Montenegro (Petrović-Njegoš)	8 January 1873	24 October 1896	29 July 1900 husband's accession	9 May 1946 husband's abdication	28 November 1952	Victor Emmanuel III
	Marie-José of Belgium		Albert I of Belgium (Saxe-Coburg and Gotha)	4 August 1906	8 January 1930	9 May 1946 husband's accession	12 June 1946 monarchy abolished	27 January 2001	Umberto II
