= Amadeus of Lausanne =

French abbot and bishop of Lausanne, declared a saint

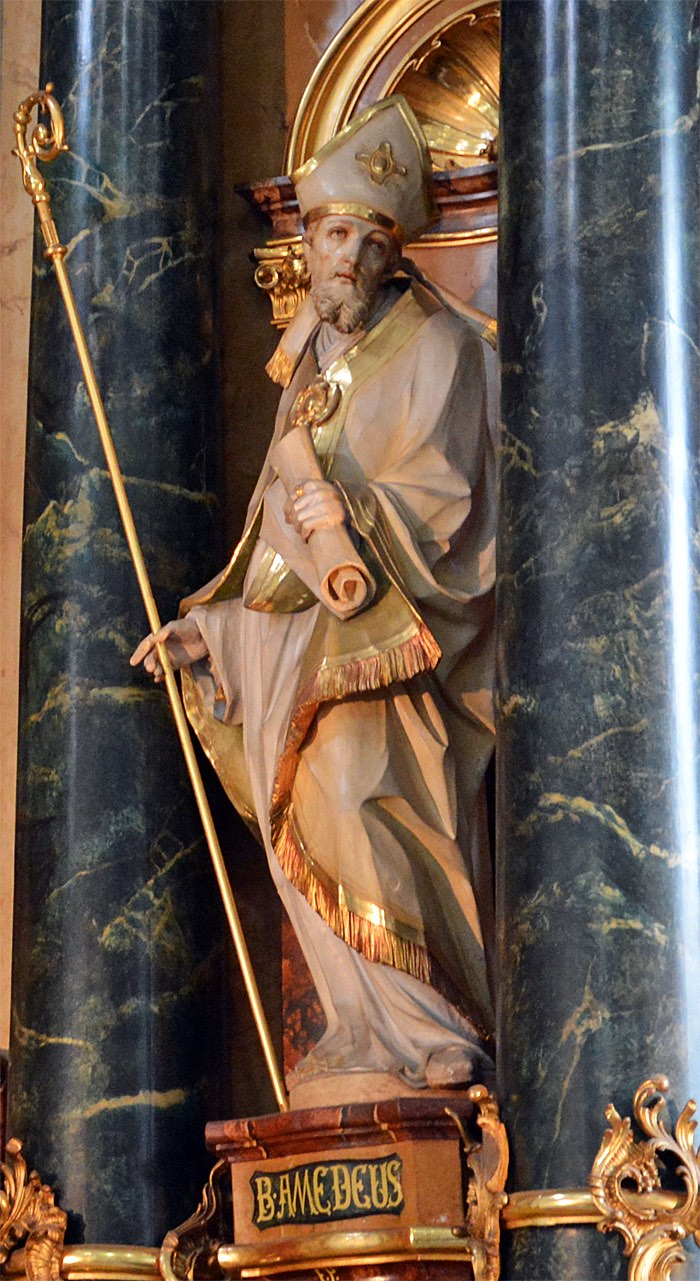
Statue of Blessed Amadeus of Lausanne in the church of Eschenbach Abbey

Amadeus of Lausanne, O.Cist. (21 January c. 1110 – 27 August 1159), was a French Cistercian monk, abbot of Hautecombe Abbey and the twenty-third Bishop of Lausanne. He has been declared a saint by the Catholic Church.

== Life ==
=== Early life ===
Amadeus was born around 1110 in the castle of Chatte, west of Grenoble. His father was Count Amadeus the Elder of Clermont, Count of Hauterives (Drôme) in France and a member of the royal family of Franconia. After his wife's death in 1119, he left this world with 16 of his vassals and entered the Cistercian monastery of the abbey of Bonnevaux. His son, Amadeus, received his first education in Bonnevaux. In 1121 young Amadeus moved to the Benedictine monastery of Cluny, and his father also spent some time in Cluny to look after his son's education.

Amadeus senior founded a number of monasteries: Léoncel, Mazan Abbey, and Montpeyroux. He was also involved with the founding of Tamié Abbey. He returned to Bonnevaux, where he died around 1150. He is considered "Blessed" and his memorial day is January 14.

The son soon moved on to the court of Emperor Henry V in order to learn life as a knight and prepare for an aristocratic career. After Henry's death in 1125, and unsatisfied with court life, Amadeus chose to enter a Cistercian monastery, this time choosing the famous Clairvaux Abbey, then led by Bernard of Clairvaux.

=== Abbot of Hautecombe ===
In 1139 he was sent to Hautecombe Abbey in Savoy to serve as its abbot; 200 monks came under his responsibility. One of his most momentous decisions was to move the community from its location to a new site on the shores of the Lac du Bourget. “Through him, the monastery achieved a high level of spiritual perfection and temporal prosperity.”

=== Bishop of Lausanne ===
Pope Lucius II elevated Amadeus to the bishopric of Lausanne in 1144. The abbot was reluctant to accept, but was consecrated on January 21, 1145. He was often met with opposition, once having to flee the city because of violent residents. It was a difficult diocese, and in a letter he tells of how his vestments were stained red by the blood of a murdered man while the bishop tried in vain to protect him. He met with the guardian bailiff of the city, Berthold IV, Duke of Zähringen to arrange cooperative relations. Amadeus' service as a bishop led to a period of spiritual and administrative stability for the region. Amadeus was particularly keen on educating the clergy better and leading them to deeper religious observance.

He was often in contact with the ecclesiastical and secular authorities of his day. Letters and charters attest to his contacts with King Conrad III, with Emperor Frederick I Barbarossa and the Cistercian Pope Eugene III, whom Amadeus knew from his days in Clairvaux. For a time, he served as the legal guardian for Blessed Humbert III, Count of Savoy, when Humbert's father Amadeus III, Count of Savoy died in the Second Crusade.

Around 1155, Emperor Frederick I Barbarossa appointed Bishop Amadeus chancellor of the Kingdom of Burgundy. Amadeus of Lausanne died in Lausanne in 1159, aged 49. He was interred in the cathedral before the Altar of the Holy Cross. In 1911, his tomb was rediscovered in the cathedral of Lausanne, and it still contained some relics.

== Spirituality ==
As bishop, Amadeus often went on retreat at Haut-Crêt Abbey, located 15 km east of Lausanne. His Marian devotions are famous, but he also venerated St. Agnes a great deal because her memorial day (January 21) was the day Amadeus was born, began school, entered the novitiate, took his monastic vows, was made abbot, and consecrated a bishop.

=== Marian Homilies ===
The eight Marian sermons are his most famous writings. As a result, he is often quoted as a classic proponent of Marian piety in the 12th century. The seventh homily is particularly relevant, since Pope Pius XII quoted from it in his Apostolic Constitution Munificentissimus Deus (1950) regarding the Assumption of Mary.

== Veneration ==
Veneration was reportedly approved in 1710 by Pope Clement XI. His cult was confirmed on December 9, 1903 (the group "Theobald of Vienna and his 16 companions") by Pope Pius X.

=== Feast day ===
His memorial day August 27, the day of his death. In the diocese of Lausanne-Geneva-Friborg, he is commemorated on August 30.

=== Iconography ===
Amadeus of Lausanne is depicted as a Cistercian bishop with princely insignia who receives a pair of gloves from the Mother of God.

== Bibliography ==
- Magnificat. Homilies in praise of the Blessed Virgin Mary. Cistercian Fathers Series, no. 18 (Kalamazoo, Mich.: Cistercian Publications, 1979)
- Andre Fracheboud: Cistercian Antecedents of the Rosary. In: Cistercian Studies Quarterly 33.2 (1998)
- Hilda C. Graef: Mary: a History of Doctrine and Devotion. (London: Sheed and Ward 1964)
