= Gertrude of Flanders =

Gertrude of Flanders may refer to:

- Gertrude of Flanders, Duchess of Lorraine (d. 1115/26), daughter of Robert I, Count of Flanders
- Gertrude of Flanders, Countess of Savoy (1112–1186), daughter of Thierry, Count of Flanders
- Gertrude of Flanders (Blackadder), fictional character in the popular BBC sitcom Blackadder
