= Guigues IV of Albon =

French aristocrat

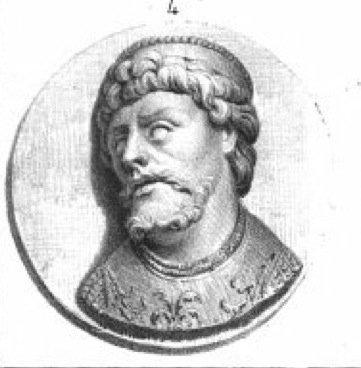
Imaginative portrait of Guigues IV by Alexandre Debelle (1839)

Guigues IV (Note: Also spelled Guigo, Guido, Guy or Wigo. His numbering, too, varies; differing versions of the genealogy of the lords of Albon count him as Guigues VI or Guigues IX. Among those lords, he was the fourth Guigues to be count.) (died 28 June 1142), called le Dauphin (Latin: Guigo Dalphinus), was the count of Albon from 1133. He was the first to take the name Dauphin, meaning "dolphin", which became a title among his successors.

Guigues was the eldest son and heir of Guigues III of Albon and Matilda. He was first called dauphin in a document of his father's from 1110. There is a theory that Matilda was in fact English, a daughter of Edgar the Ætheling, and that the name Dauphin came to Guigues through her, since she had a relative named Dolfin, a son of Gospatric, Earl of Northumbria. Another theory posits that Matilda was a daughter of Count Roger I of Sicily and the widow of King Conrad II of Italy.

Guigues married Margaret, daughter of Stephen I, Count of Burgundy, and niece of Pope Calixtus II.

Guigues had good relations with the priory of Oulx and the abbey of Bonnevaux, to which he made gifts. In 1140, however, Guigues was involved in a dispute with the bishop Hugh II of Grenoble.

In or about 1134, Count Amadeus III of Savoy married Guigues's sister Matilda. Her dowry was the likely cause of the dispute that erupted between the two counts in 1140, the first war between the two counties. Guigues invaded the county of Savoy and besieged Montmélian. Ambushed by Amadeus near the castle of La Buissière, he was wounded in battle and died a few days later on 28 June 1142. He was succeeded by his son Guigues V.

Guigues IV may have been the inspiration for the character of Schionatulander in Wolfram von Eschenbach's romance Titurel, written around 1217.
