= Guigues IV =

Guigues IV may refer to:

- Guigues IV of Albon
- Guigues IV of Forez
