= Beatrice of Viennois =

Countess of Savoy

Beatrice of Vienne
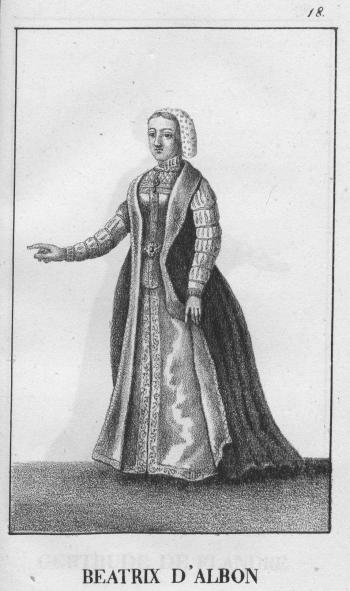
- 1827 image
- Born: 1160; Vienne, France
- Died: 1230 (aged 69–70); Champagne-et-Fontaine, Aquitaine, France
- Noble family: House of Ivrea
- Spouse: Humbert III, Count of Savoy
- Issue: Thomas, Count of Savoy
- Father: Géraud I, Count of Mâcon
- Mother: Maurette de Salins

Beatrice of Vienne (1160–1230) was a Countess of Savoy by marriage to Humbert III, Count of Savoy.

== Biography ==
Beatrice was born in 1160 in Vienne, France, the second child of Géraud I of Mâcon (son of William III of Mâcon) and Maurette de Salins. She was descended from the House of Mâcon and had seven siblings.

After the death of Humbert III, Count of Savoy's third wife, Clementia of Zähringen, in 1175, Humbert was inconsolable and refused to remarry; however, he had no male heir. His advisers persuaded him to wed Beatrice the following year. Beatrice gave birth to Thomas, Count of Savoy in 1178.

Beatrice died in 1230 in Champagne-et-Fontaine, Aquitaine, France.

== Sources ==
- Boucharlat, Alain (1997). La Fontaine de Siloé [The Fountain of Siloé] (in French). p. 17. ISBN 978-2862532219.
- Previte-Orton, C.W. (1912). The Early History of the House of Savoy: 1000-1233. Cambridge University Press.

Beatrice of Viennois House of Ivrea Born: 1160 Died: 1230
Preceded by Clementia of Zähringen	Countess of Savoy; 1176–1189	Succeeded by Margaret of Geneva
