= Gertrude of Bavaria =

Queen of Denmark from 1182 to 1197

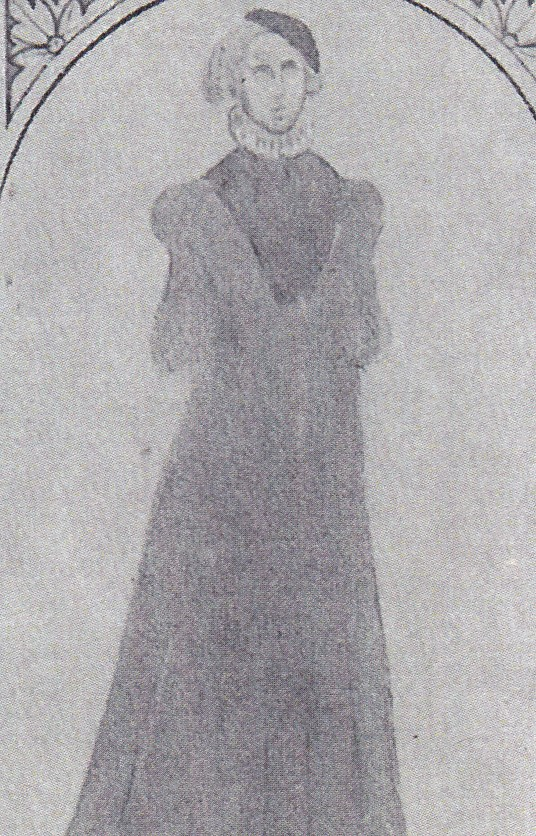

Queen consort of Denmark
- Tenure: 1182–1197
- Born: 1152/55
- Died: 1 June 1197
- Burial: Vä, Skåne
- Spouse: Frederick IV, Duke of Swabia (m. 1166; died 1167) Canute VI of Denmark (m. 1177)
- House: Welf
- Father: Henry the Lion
- Mother: Clementia of Zähringen

Gertrude of Bavaria, also called Gertrude of Saxony (Danish and German: Gertrud; 1152/55–1197), was Duchess of Swabia as the spouse of Duke Frederick IV, and Queen of Denmark as the spouse of King Canute VI.

Gertrude was born to Henry the Lion of Bavaria and Saxony and Clementia of Zähringen in either 1152 or 1155. She was married to Frederick IV, Duke of Swabia, in 1166, and became a widow in 1167. In 1171, she was engaged and in February 1177 married to Canute of Denmark in Lund. The couple lived the first years in Skåne.

On 12 May 1182, they became king and queen. She did not have any children. During her second marriage, she chose to live in chastity and celibacy with her husband. Chronicler Arnold of Lübeck remarked of their marriage that her spouse was: "The most chaste one, living thus his days with his chaste spouse" in eternal chastity.

== Sources ==
- Skovgaard-Petersen, Inge (1998). "Queenship in Medieval Denmark". In Parsons, John Carmi (ed.). Medieval Queenship. St. Martin's Press. pp. 25–43.41
- Loud, Graham A. (2019). The Chronicle of Arnold of Lübeck. Routledge.
- Alf Henrikson: Dansk historia (Danish history) (1989) (Swedish)
- Sven Rosborn (In Swedish): När hände vad i Nordens historia (What happened when in Nordic history) (1997)
- Dansk biografisk Lexikon / VI. Bind. Gerson - H. Hansen (in Danish)

Gertrude of Bavaria House of Welf
Danish royalty
Preceded by Sofia of Minsk	Queen consort of Denmark; 1182–1197	Succeeded by Dagmar of Bohemia
