= Hugh (archbishop of Vienne) =

French archbishop and Carthusian monk

Hugh (died 1155) was a Carthusian monk who served as the bishop of Grenoble from 1132 until 1148 and then as the archbishop of Vienne from 1148 until 1153, when he retired to his old priory of Portes. As bishop of Grenoble, he was Hugh II, succeeding a fellow Carthusian, Hugh of Châteauneuf. His episcopate at Grenoble was marked by conflict with Count Guigues IV of Albon. At Vienne, he provoked displeasure from the Cluniacs and Cistercians.
