= Sibylla of Anjou =

Countess of Flanders from 1139 to 1165

Countess consort of Flanders
- Tenure: 1139–1165
- Born: c. 1112
- Died: 1165 (aged c. 53); Abbey of Sts. Mary and Martha, Bethany (now al-Eizariya, West Bank)
- Burial: Abbey of St Lazarus
- Spouse: William Clito, Count of Flanders (m. 1123; ann. 1124) Thierry, Count of Flanders (m. 1139; died 1165)
- Issue more...: Philip, Count of Flanders; Matthew, Count of Boulogne; Margaret I, Countess of Flanders; Gertrude, Countess of Savoy
- House: Anjou
- Father: Fulk, King of Jerusalem
- Mother: Eremburga of Maine

Sibylla of Anjou (Sibylle d’Anjou; c. 1112–1165) was a countess consort of Flanders as the wife of Count Thierry. Sibylla ruled the County of Flanders as regent during the absence of her spouse from 1147 to 1149.

== First marriage ==
Sybilla was the daughter of Fulk V of Anjou and Eremburga of Maine.

In 1123, she married William Clito, nephew and rival of King Henry I of England. Sibylla brought the County of Maine to this marriage, which was annulled, narrowly, in 1124 on grounds of consanguinity. The annulment was made by Pope Calixtus II upon request from Henry; Fulk opposed it and did not consent until Calixtus excommunicated him and placed an interdict over Anjou.

== Countess consort of Flanders ==
In 1134, Sibylla married Thierry, Count of Flanders. During his absence on the Second Crusade the pregnant Sibylla acted as regent of the county. Baldwin IV, Count of Hainaut took the opportunity to attack Flanders, but Sibylla led a counter-attack and pillaged Hainaut. In response Baldwin ravaged Artois. The archbishop of Reims intervened and a truce was signed, but Thierry took vengeance on Baldwin when he returned in 1149.

In 1157 Sibylla travelled with Thierry on his third pilgrimage, but after arriving in Jerusalem she separated from her husband and refused to return home with him. She became a nun at the Convent of Sts. Mary and Martha in Bethany, where her step-aunt, Ioveta of Bethany, was abbess. Ioveta and Sibylla supported Queen Melisende of Jerusalem and held some influence over the church. They supported the election of Amalric of Nesle as Latin Patriarch of Jerusalem over a number of other candidates. Sibylla died in Bethany in 1165.

== Issue ==
Sibylla and Thierry had:

- Philip I, Count of Flanders, married firstly to Elisabeth of Vermandois, then secondly to Theresa of Portugal. He had no legitimate issue and one illegitimate son Thierry of Flanders.
- Matthew of Alsace, Count of Boulogne (1137–1173), married firstly to Marie of Boulogne then secondly to Eleanor of Vermandois. Had issue.
- Margaret, Countess of Flanders and Hainaut (1145-1194), married Baldwin V, Count of Hainaut. Had issue.
- Gertrude of Flanders (1135–1186), married Humbert III, Count of Savoy then secondly Hughues d'Oisy. Had no issue.
- Matilda
- Peter, bishop-elect of Cambrai

== Sources ==
- Adair, Penelope A. (2003). "Flemish Comital Family and the Crusades". In Semaan, Khalil I. (ed.). The Crusades: Other Experiences, Alternate Perspective. Global Academic Publishing.
- Barber, Malcolm (2012). The Crusader States. Yale University Press.
- Gilbert of Mons (2005). Chronicle of Hainaut. Translated by Napran, Laura. The Boydell Press.
- Harwood, Sophie (2020). Medieval Women and War: Female Roles in the Old French Tradition. Bloomsbury.
- Hollister, C. Warren (1984). "War and Diplomacy in the Anglo-Norman world: the reign of Henry I". In Brown, Reginald Allen (ed.). Anglo-Norman Studies VI: Proceedings of the Battle Conference 1983. Boydell Press.
- Lane-Poole, Stanley (2002). Saladin and the Fall of Jerusalem. Greenhill Books.
- N. Huyghebaert, Une comtesse de Flandre à Béthanie, in "Les cahiers de Saint -André", 1964, n°2, 15p.
- Runciman, Steven (1952). A History of the Crusades. Vol. II: The Kingdom of Jerusalem. Cambridge University Press.
- Stroll, Mary (2004). Calixtus the Second, 1119-1124. Brill.166-167
- William of Tyre, A History of Deeds Done Beyond the Sea. E. A. Babcock and A. C. Krey, trans. Columbia University Press, 1943.
