= Faidiva of Toulouse =

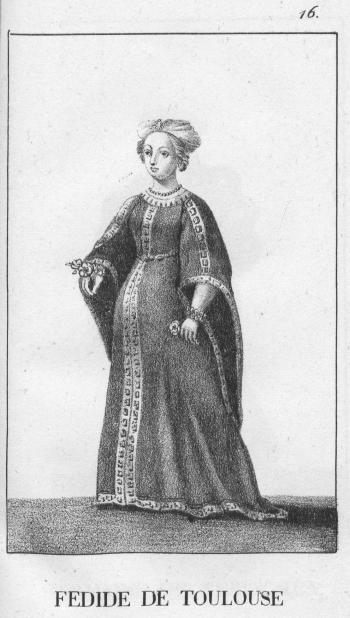
A full image of Faidiva of Toulouse

Faidiva of Toulouse (1133 – 1154) was a Countess Consort of Savoy by marriage to Humbert III, Count of Savoy, with the wedding occurring in 1151.

She was the daughter of Alfonso Jordan.

She died childless.

Preceded by Mahaut of Albon	Countess of Savoy; 1151–1154	Succeeded by Gertrude of Flanders
