= Clementia of Zähringen =

Duchess of Bavaria (1147–1162) and Saxony (1156–1162)

- Duchess of Bavaria and Saxony; Countess of Savoy
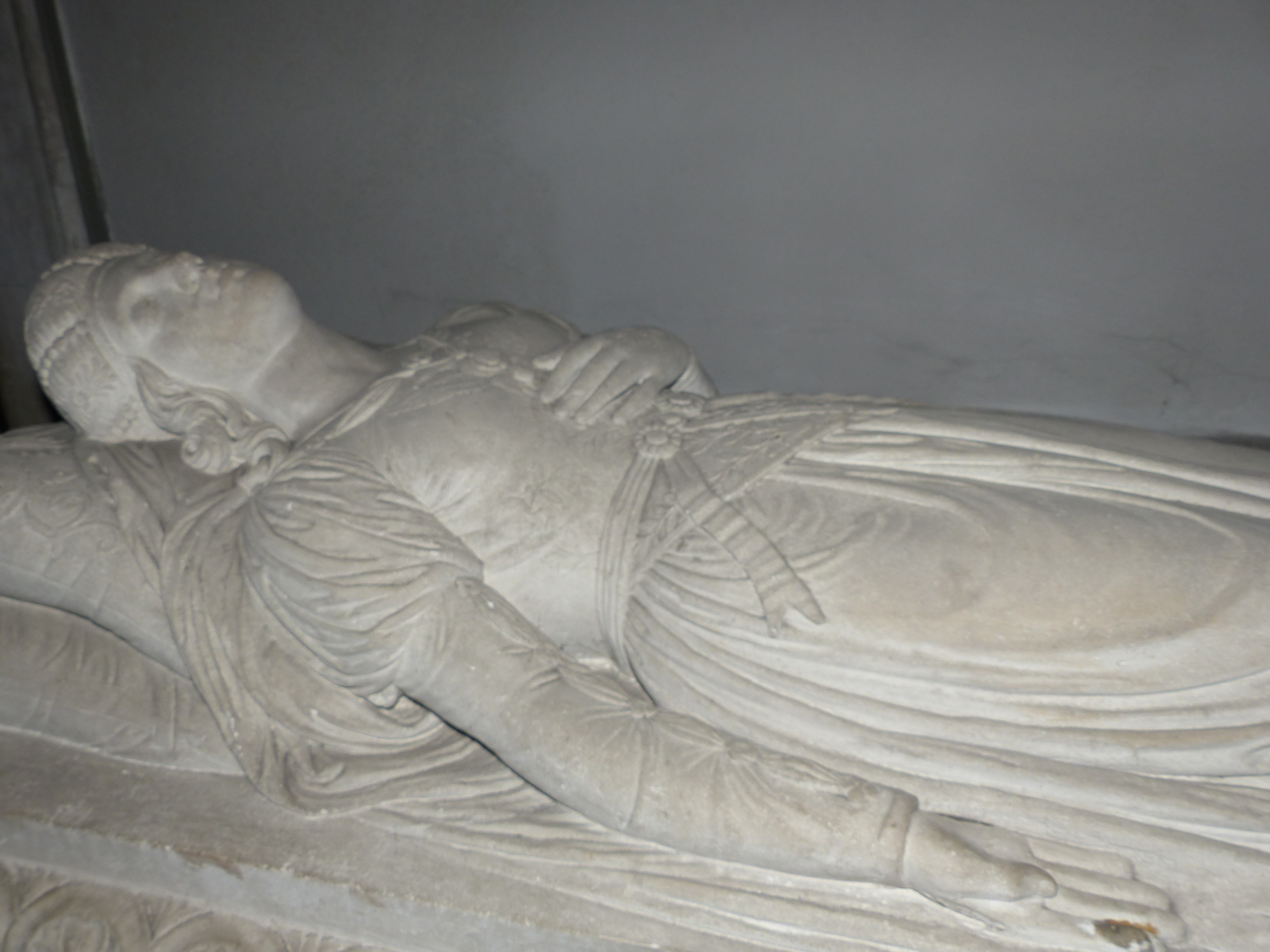
- Tomb of Clementia of Zähringen
- Died: 1175
- Spouse: Henry the Lion; Umberto III, Count of Savoy
- Issue: Henry of Saxony; Gertrude, Queen of Denmark; Richenza of Saxony; Sophia, Lady of Ferrara; Alicia of Savoy
- House: House of Zähringen
- Father: Conrad I, Duke of Zähringen
- Mother: Clementia of Namur

Clementia of Zähringen (died 1175), was a daughter of Conrad I, Duke of Zähringen and his wife Clementia of Namur. By her first marriage, Clementia was Duchess of Bavaria and Saxony. By her second marriage she was Countess of Savoy.

== Duchess of Saxony and Bavaria ==
Clementia was the youngest of six children, her family owned territory in Swabia. She was a great-granddaughter of Conrad I, Count of Luxembourg and his wife Clementia of Aquitaine, herself daughter of William VII, Duke of Aquitaine.

Clementia was firstly married in 1147 to Henry the Lion, Duke of Saxony, he later inherited Bavaria. The marriage was arranged to confirm her father's alliance with the Welf party in Southern Germany. She was heiress of Badenweiler, although her husband sold these Swabian estates to Frederick I, Holy Roman Emperor in 1158, receiving in exchange Herzberg, Scharzfels and Pöhlde south of the Harz.

Clementia and Henry had three children:

- Henry, died young
- Gertrude (1155–1197), married first Frederick IV, Duke of Swabia, and then King Canute VI of Denmark
- Richenza (c. 1157 – 1167), died young

Henry repudiated Clementia because of the growing difficulties between her brother Duke Berthold IV and Emperor Frederick, the latter with whom Duke Henry was by then in close alliance with. Frederick did not cherish Guelphish possessions in his home area and offered Henry several fortresses in Saxony in exchange. The couple's marriage was declared null at Constance on 23 November 1162.

== Countess of Savoy ==
Clementia remained unwed for two years before she married her second husband, Umberto III, Count of Savoy, Clementia being his third wife. Umberto's first two marriages were not successful, his first wife died young; his second marriage ended in an annulment. Umberto gave up and became a Carthusian monk. However, the nobles and common people of Savoy begged him to marry yet again, which he reluctantly did to Clementia.

Clementia and Humbert had two daughters:

- Sophia (1165–1202), married Azzo VI of Este
- Alicia (1166–1178), betrothed to John of England

Clementia died in 1175, predeceasing both her husbands and three of her four daughters. After her death, Umberto attempted to return to the monastic life yet again but was forced to remarry a fourth and final time to Beatrice of Viennois who bore him the long-awaited son and heir, Thomas.

== Notes ==
Vacant Title last held by Sophie of Winzenburg	Duchess of Saxony; 1147–1162	Vacant Title next held by Matilda of England
Preceded by Theodora Komnene	Duchess of Bavaria; 1156–1162	Vacant Title next held by Matilda of England
Vacant Title last held by Gertrude of Flanders	Countess of Savoy; 1162–1164	Vacant Title next held by Beatrice of Viennois
