= Eschenbach Abbey =

Cistercian nunnery in Switzerland

Coordinates: 47.1327°N 8.3213°E

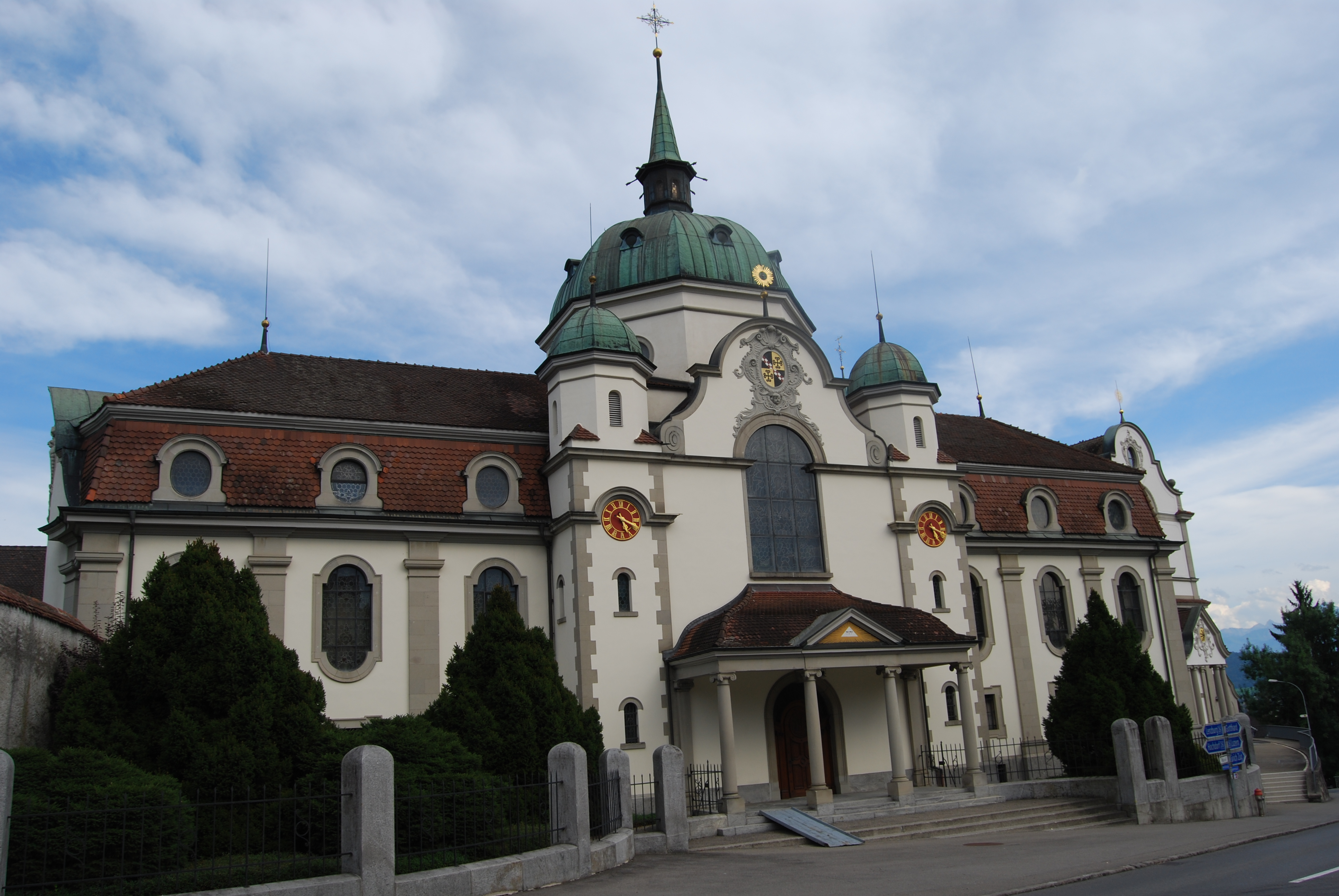
Eschenbach Abbey church

Eschenbach Abbey (German: Kloster Eschenbach; Latin: Abbatia B. M. V. et Sanctae Catharinae) is a community of Cistercian nuns in Eschenbach in Lucerne, Switzerland. The abbey was founded in about 1290 for Augustinian nuns, and became Cistercian in 1588.

== History ==
The abbey was founded by Baron Walther III von Eschenbach in about 1290 in Niedereschenbach in the present municipality of Inwil. The chapel of St. Catherine in Niedereschenbach still marks the location of the first nunnery, which was for a community of Augustinian nuns. In 1309 the abbey moved from Niedereschenbach to its present site in Obereschenbach. In 1588 the nuns joined the Cistercian Order, and from then on lived according to the Rule of St Benedict.

In 1612 the guest house was built. In 1625 the foundation stone was laid of the new abbey church, 24 cells, the cloister and the chapter house. In 1683 the guest house was refurbished and extended, and the famous sundial was installed, the largest in Switzerland. In 1910, when the parish of Eschenbach built a new parish church separate from that of the abbey, which up to then had been shared by both, the community also decided to build a new abbey church (designed in Baroque revival style by the architect August Hardegger), which was dedicated in the same year.

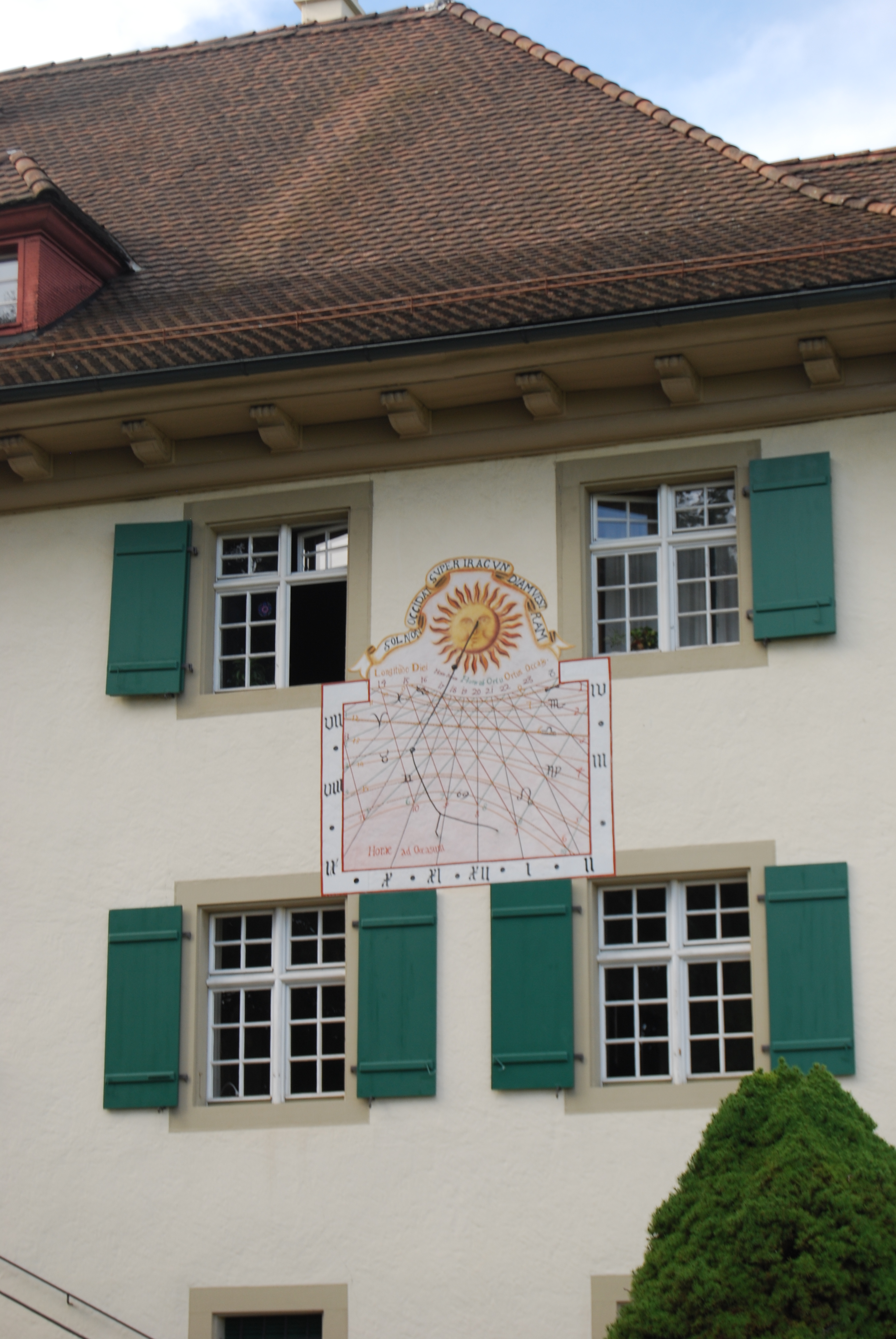
Sundial on the guest house

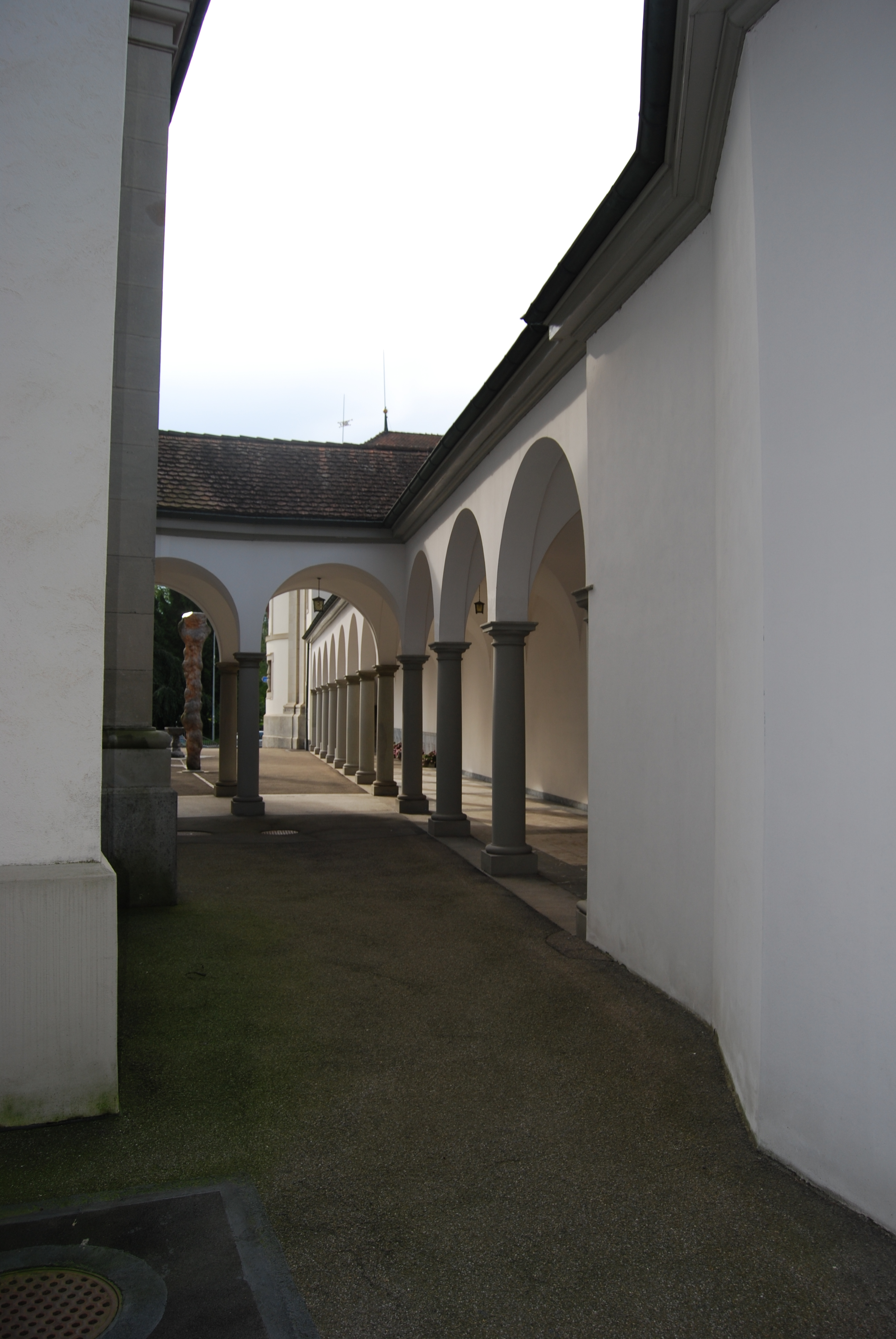
Cloister

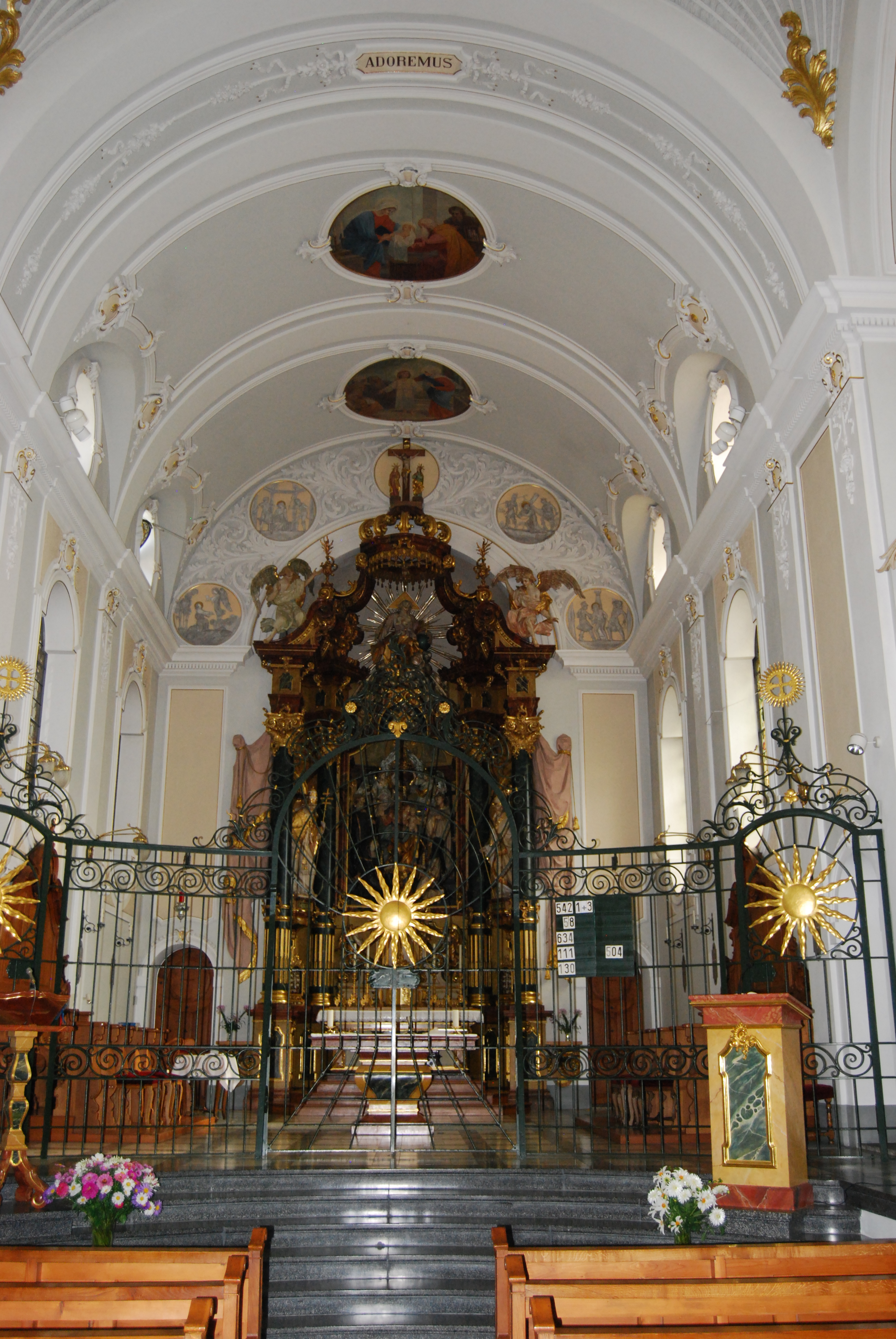
Abbey church interior
