= Humbert III of Savoy =

Count of Savoy

Humbert III

Count of Savoy
- Reign: 1148–1189
- Predecessor: Amadeus III
- Successor: Thomas
- Born: 1136; Avigliana, Piedmont
- Died: 4 March 1189 (aged 52–53); Chambéry, Savoy
- Noble family: Savoy
- Spouses: Faidiva of Toulouse; Gertrude of Flanders; Clementia of Zähringen; Beatrice of Viennois
- Issue Detail: Thomas I of Savoy
- Father: Amadeus III of Savoy
- Mother: Mahaut of Albon

Humbert III (1136 – 4 March 1189), surnamed the Blessed, was Count of Savoy from 1148 to 1189. His parents were Amadeus III of Savoy and Mahaut of Albon. He ceded rights and benefits to monasteries and played a decisive role in the organisation of Hautecombe Abbey. It is said that he would rather have been a monk than a sovereign. On the death of his third wife, he retired to Hautecombe, but then changed his mind and, by his fourth wife finally had a son, Thomas. He sided with the Guelph party of Pope Alexander III against the Ghibelline emperor Frederick Barbarossa. The result was an invasion of his states twice: in 1174 Susa was set on fire, and in 1187 Henry VI banished him from the Holy Roman Empire and wrested away most of his domains. He was left with only the valleys of Susa and Aosta. He died at Chambéry in 1189. He was the first prince buried at Hautecombe. His memorial day is 4 March.

== Early life ==
Humbert III was born on the 1st of August 1136 in the castle of Avigliana, Piedmont, near Turin, to Count Amadeus III of Savoy and Mahaut (Mathilde), Countess of Albon and Vienne. He spent the first years of his life under the tutelage of Amadeus, an abbot of Hautecombe Abbey, a man known for his great piety and for having been chancellor of the empire and bishop of Lausanne. Humbert, indifferent to worldly grandeur, loved only quiet solitude and a contemplative way of life, whether by natural instinct or by the principles inspired in him by his monk-tutor.

Humbert III is an important figure in medieval society, as attested in the history of the House of Savoy. His life was characterised by certain key features, including mysticism, borne of a vocation and tradition of the contemplative life. This he fostered in parallel with, and notwithstanding, his role as military leader and politician, undertaken reluctantly and only to safeguard his family’s dynastic claims.

With his father he had inherited from his grandfather, Humbert II, the dream of reuniting the fragmented Kingdom of Burgundy, in sharp contrast with a centralising policy of the French royal family. In those efforts, Humbert was supported by Frederick I Barbarossa, but found himself required to quell neighbouring feudal lords settled among his domains. Like his father, himself dying young when his son was not yet of age, his education was entrusted to Amadeus of Lausanne, former abbot of Hautecombe. Under his guidance the young Humbert made great progress in studies and spiritual formation, foregoing worldly glamour and giving himself to prayer, meditation and penance. To better achieve this he frequently withdrew to Hautecombe Abbey, on the banks of Lake Bourget in Savoy, founded by his father. It was always with expressions of regret when duties to the family and the Savoyard nobility called him back to political affairs.

== Marriages ==
Amadeus III was a pilgrim in the Holy Land in 1122. He went there through the offices of Pope Callixtus II, and in 1146 he participated in the Second Crusade, and died on the island of Cyprus in Nicosia on 1 April 1148, where he was buried, leaving the twelve-year-old Humbert as heir. Although still at an early age, in 1151 Humbert was betrothed to Faidiva, daughter of Alphonse Jourdain, Count of Toulouse. She soon died without issue. He later married Gertrude, daughter of Thierry, Count of Flanders and Sibylla of Anjou. This second marriage was annulled.

In 1164, Humbert married Clementia of Zähringen, by whom he had two daughters: Alice and Sofia. She died in 1173, and he decided to retire to Hautecombe, but not for long. In 1177, the nobility convinced him to marry for the fourth time. As a wife, he took Beatrice, daughter Géraud I of Mâcon and Maurette de Salins. They had a son, Thomas, to continue the dynasty. Beatrice also bore him a daughter who died at the age of seven.

== Reign ==
Humbert's reign lasted forty years, and was characterized by struggles with the Holy Roman emperor, various lords and count-bishops. The main reason for conflict consisted in the patronage of the bishop of Turin by Frederick Barbarossa, who dreamed of undisturbed dominance of the capital of Piedmont. This led to a gradual reduction of the possessions and authority of Humbert III on the Italian side, leaving him with the rump territories of the valleys of Susa and Aosta. In 1174 the emperor pillaged the town of Susa.

In 1187, he was banished from the Holy Roman Empire by Henry VI for supporting the emperor's opponents. He did not retire, as has been said, to his Alpine domains, devoting himself in particular to the practice of personal virtues and fraternal charity. He also promoted the foundation of Precettoria of St. Anthony of Ranverso at Buttigliera Alta, not far from the town of Avigliana, entrusting it to Antoniani from Vienne, France.

== Death ==
The death of Humbert III, 4 March 1189 in Chambéry, Savoy at the age of fifty-two, was mourned sincerely by all the people. He was the first prince of Savoy to be buried in Hautecombe Abbey, which has since become a burial place for the dynasty.

== Veneration ==
The spirituality of Humbert undoubtedly blossomed in an environment of ancient Christian traditions, favoured especially by the example of his father, a pilgrim and crusader in the Holy Land, and of his tutor, Amadeus, Bishop of Lausanne. However, Humbert's life was full of contradictions: He was a lover of peace but had frequent hostilities and wars. He was penitent, ascetic, and contemplative, but was forced to take the reins of government, during which time he had a life of action, and found himself forced into marriage in order to have an heir. However, he let unmistakable signs of great moral balance, severity with himself and indulgence and love of neighbour. He was a benefactor to churches, monasteries, and charitable causes, the care of the poor. Throughout his life, he supported Hautecombe Abbey. In 1188 he founded the Monastery of Sant'Antonio di Ranverso.

Humbert was venerated by many immediately after his death. Miracles were reportedly wrought through his intercession. In Aosta, he is depicted on the facade of the city's cathedral. He is mentioned by Alphonsus Ligouri as a particularly pious monk.

In 1838, Charles Albert, King of Sardinia and his descendant, succeeded in having him beatified by Pope Gregory XVI. The king's efforts on behalf of Boniface of Savoy, Archbishop of Canterbury, also succeeded. In Italy, Humbert is still remembered in particular at Racconigi, where the Royal Sanctuary of the Madonna delle Grazie houses a picture of him.

== Family ==
Humbert had four wives:

- 1. Faidiva of Toulouse (d. c. 1154) daughter of Alphonse Jourdain, Count of Toulouse
- 2. Gertrude of Flanders (m. abt. 1155). The marriage was annulled, she was confined to a convent, later freed, and returned to the court of her brother, Philip of Flanders
- 3. Clementia of Zähringen (married 1164), daughter of Conrad I, Duke of Zähringen. They had two daughters:

- Sofia, (1165–1202), married Azzo VI of Este
- Alicia, (1166–1178), betrothed to John of England

- 4. Beatrice of Viennois and had one son:

- Thomas (born 1178)

== Notes ==
Humbert III the Blessed House of Savoy Born: 1135 Died: 1189
Regnal titles
Preceded by Amadeus III	Count of Savoy; 1148–1189	Succeeded by Thomas
