= Guigues III of Albon =

French nobleman, first Count of Albon (1050s–1133)

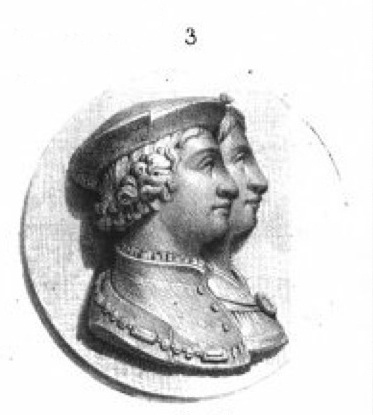
- Born: Between 1050 and 1060
- Died: 21 December 1133; France
- Noble family: House of Albon
- Spouse: Matilda
- Issue: Guigues IV; Humbert; Guigues; Gersenda; Mahaut of Albon; Beatrice
- Father: Guigues II of Albon
- Mother: Petronille N.

Guigues the Old, called Guigues III (born 1050/1060; died 21 December 1133), was a Count of Albon from 1079, when the County of Vienne, then in the possession of the Archdiocese of Vienne, was divided between him and Humbert I of Savoy, who received Maurienne. These territories were then part of the Kingdom of Arles in the Holy Roman Empire.

He was the son of Guigues II of Albon and Petronille. There is no source which records her parents or ancestry. His ancestors were lords of the castle of Albon and counts (comites) in the Grésivaudan and Briançonnais.

== Reign ==
Guigues's reign was marked by continual strife with Hugh of Châteauneuf, Bishop of Grenoble, over the suzerainty of certain church lands in the Grésivaudan. Hugh accused the count of usurping the lands with the help of the Bishop Mallem and invented fantastic stories to back up his claim to the disputed estates. Finally, an accord was signed between Guigues and the bishop in 1099. Guigues returned the ecclesiastic land, while Hugh recognised the authority of the count in the vicinity of Grenoble.

== Personal life ==
In 1095, Guigues married Matilda, long thought to be the daughter of Edgar Ætheling, but now thought more likely to have been a daughter of Roger I of Sicily, the Great Count, and his third wife, Adelaide del Vasto.

In 1129, Guigues benefited further from the division of the Viennois between himself and Amadeus III of Savoy. Four years later, he died, leaving as his heir Guigues IV "dauphin" (died 28 June 1142) and a second son, Humbert, Archbishop of Vienne (died 26 June 1147). He had a third son, Guigues "the elder", who was living in 1105 and died young. He also had three daughters:

- Garsenda, married William III of Forcalquier
- Matilda, married Amadeus III of Savoy
- Beatrice (born c. 1100), married Josserand de Die (c. 1095 – c. 1147)

== Sources ==
- Moriarty, G. Andrews. "Mathilda, Wife of Guigues VIII, Count of Albon", The New England Historical and Genealogical Register volume CXI (October 1957).
