= Jeanne de Montfort de Chambéon =

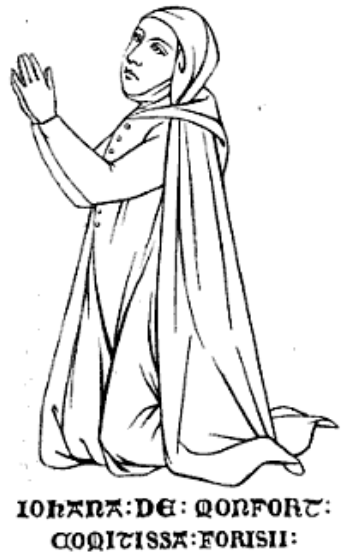
- Born: 1250
- Died: 1300 (aged 49–50)

Jeanne de Montfort de Chambéon (1250 - 1300) was a House of Savoy noblewoman. She was baroness of Vaud by marriage to Louis I of Vaud, and regent during the minority of her son Jean I in 1278-1290.
