= Thierry, Count of Flanders =

Count of Flanders from 1128 to 1168

Theoderic
- Count of Flanders
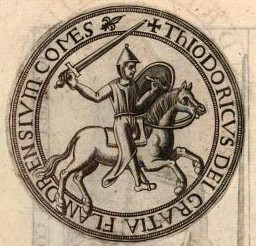
- Seal effigy
- Born: c. 1099
- Died: 17 January 1168 (aged 68–69)
- Buried: Abbey of Watten
- Noble family: Alsace
- Spouses: Margaret of Clermont (or Swanhilde); Sibylla of Anjou
- Issue: Laurette of Flanders; Philip I, Count of Flanders; Matthew, Count of Boulogne; Margaret I, Countess of Flanders; Gertrude, Countess of Savoy; Matilda of Flanders; Peter of Flanders
- Father: Theoderic II, Duke of Lorraine
- Mother: Gertrude of Flanders

Theoderic (Dutch: Diederik, French: Thierry, German: Dietrich; c. 1099 – 17 January 1168), commonly known as Thierry of Alsace, was count of Flanders from 1128 to 1168. With a record of four campaigns in the Levant and Africa (including participation in the Second Crusade, the failed 1157–1158 siege of the Syrian city Shaizar, and the 1164 invasion of Egypt), he had a rare and distinguished record of commitment to crusading.

== Countship ==
Theoderic was the youngest son of Duke Theoderic II of Lorraine and Gertrude, daughter of Count Robert I of Flanders. After the murder of his cousin, Charles the Good, in 1127, Theoderic claimed the County of Flanders, but another cousin, William Clito, became count instead with the support of King Louis VI of France. William's politics and attitude towards the autonomy of Flanders made him unpopular, and by the end of the year Bruges, Ghent, Lille, and Saint-Omer recognized Theoderic as a rival count. Theoderic's supporters came from the Imperial faction of Flanders.

Louis VI of France had Raymond of Martigné, the Archbishop of Reims, excommunicate Theoderic. Louis VI then besieged Lille, but was forced to retire when Henry I of England, William Clito's uncle, transferred his support to Theoderic. However, Theoderic was defeated at Axspoele and fled to Bruges. He was forced to flee Bruges as well, and went to Aalst, where he was soon under siege from William, Godfrey I of Leuven, and Louis VI. The city was about to be captured when William died on 28 July 1128 from an infected wound sustained during the siege, leaving Theoderic as the only claimant to the seat.

Theoderic set up his government in Ghent and was recognized by all the Flemish cities as well as King Henry, who had his Flemish lords in England swear fealty to him. Theoderic himself swore homage to Louis VI after 1132, in order to gain the French king's support against Baldwin IV, Count of Hainaut, who had advanced his own claim on Flanders.

== Pilgrimage and Second Crusade ==
In 1132, his wife, Suanhilde, died, leaving only a daughter. In 1139, he went on pilgrimage to the crusader Kingdom of Jerusalem, and married Sibylla of Anjou, daughter of King Fulk of Jerusalem and the widow of William Clito; a very prestigious marriage. This was the first of Theoderic's four pilgrimages to the Holy Land. While there he also led a victorious expedition against Caesarea Phillippi, and fought alongside his father-in-law in an invasion of Gilead. He soon returned to Flanders to put down a revolt in the Duchy of Lower Lotharingia, ruled at the time by Godfrey III of Leuven.

Theoderic joined the Second Crusade in 1147. He led the crossing of the Maeander River in Anatolia and fought at the Battla of Attalya in 1148, and after arriving in the crusader Kingdom he participated in the Council of Acre, where the ill-fated decision to attack Damascus was made.

Theoderic participated in the Siege of Damascus, led by his wife's half-brother Baldwin III of Jerusalem, and with the support of Baldwin, Louis VII of France, and Conrad III of Germany, he lay claim to Damascus. However, the native crusader barons preferred one of their own nobles, Guy I Brisebarre, lord of Beirut. According to William of Tyre, the resulting dispute contributed to the final failure of the siege: 'for the local barons preferred that the Damascenes should keep their city rather than to see it given to the count', and so did all they could to ensure the siege collapsed. Therefore, William continues, many contemporaries blamed Theoderic for the ultimate failure of the Second Crusade (though it is notable that William himself declines to say whether he believed Theoderic responsible).

During his absence, Baldwin IV of Hainaut invaded Flanders and pillaged Artois; Sibylla reacted strongly and had Hainaut pillaged in response. The Archbishop of Reims intervened and a treaty was signed. When Theoderic returned in 1150, he took vengeance on Baldwin IV at Bouchain, with the aid of Henry I, Count of Namur and Henry II of Leez, Bishop of Liège. In the subsequent peace negotiations, Theoderic gave his daughter Marguerite in marriage to Baldwin IV's son, the future Baldwin V, Count of Hainaut.

== Return to Holy Land ==
In 1156, Theoderic had his eldest surviving son married to Elizabeth, daughter of Ralph I of Vermandois. In 1156, he returned to the Holy Land, this time with his wife accompanying him. He participated in Baldwin III's siege of Shaizar in 1157, but the fortress remained in Muslim hands when a dispute arose between Theoderic and Raynald of Châtillon over who would possess it should it be captured. He returned to Flanders 1159 without Sibylla, who remained behind to become a nun at the convent of St. Lazarus in Bethany. Their son Philip had ruled the county in their absence, and he remained co-count after Theoderic's return. In 1164, Theoderic returned once more to the Holy Land. He accompanied King Amalric I, another half-brother of Sibylla, to Antioch and Tripoli. He returned home in 1166, and adopted a date palm as his seal, with a crown of laurels on the reverse.

== Death ==
Thierry died on 17 January 1168 and was buried in the Abbey of Watten, between Saint-Omer and Gravelines. His rule had been moderate and peaceful; the highly developed administration of the county in later centuries first began during these years. There had also been great economic and agricultural development, and new commercial enterprises were established; Flanders' greatest territorial expansion occurred under Theoderic.

== Family ==
Thierry's first wife, Margaret of Clermont (or Swanhilde), died in 1132, leaving only one daughter:

1. Laurette, who married four times: Iwain, Count of Aalst; Henry II, Duke of Limburg; Raoul I of Vermandois, Count of Vermandois; and Henry IV of Luxembourg. Laurette finally retired to a nunnery, where she died in 1170.

Theoderic secondly married Sibylla of Anjou, daughter of Fulk V of Anjou and Ermengarde of Maine, and former bride of William Clito. Their children were:

1. Baldwin ( ca 1135 - died ca 1150 )
2. Philip I (died 1191)
3. Matthew (died 1173), married Countess Marie I of Boulogne
4. Margaret I (died 1194), married Ralph II, count of Vermandois and Valois (died 1167, son of Ralph I), and then she married Baldwin V, Count of Hainaut
5. Gertrude (died 1186), married Humbert III of Savoy
6. Matilda, abbess of Fontevrault
7. Peter (died 1176), elected but never consecrated bishop of Cambrai

== Sources ==
- Aird, William M. (2008). Robert Curthose, Duke of Normandy: c. 1050-1134. The Boydell Press.
- Baldwin, John W. (1986). The Government of Philip Augustus: Foundations of French Royal Power in the Middle Ages. University of California Press.
- Baldwin, Marsall W. (1969) [1955]. "The Latin States under Baldwin III and Amalric I, 1143–1174; The Decline and Fall of Jerusalem, 1174–1189". In Setton, Kenneth M.; Baldwin, Marshall W. (eds.). A History of the Crusades, Volume I: The First Hundred Years. Vol. 1 (Second ed.). Madison, Milwaukee, and London: University of Wisconsin Press. pp. 528–561, 590–621. ISBN 0-299-04834-9.
- George, Hereford Brooke (1875). Genealogical Tables Illustrative of Modern History. Oxford at the Clarendon Press.
- Gislebertus (of Mons) (2005). Chronicle of Hainaut. Translated by Napran, Laura. The Boydell Press.
- Hollister, C. Warren (2003). Henry I. Yale University Press.
- Nicholas, David M (1992). Medieval Flanders. Routledge.
- Tanner, Heather J. (2022). "The Twelfth-Century Norman and Angevin Duke-Kings of England and the Northern French Nobility". In Church, Stephen D (ed.). Anglo-Norman Studies XLIV: Proceedings of the Battle Conference 2021. The Boydell Press. pp. 153–168. 156-157
- Van Werveke, Hans (1976). Een Vlaamse graaf van Europees formaat [A Flemish count of European stature] (in Dutch). Bussum: Fibula - Van Dishoeck. ISBN 9022835650.

Thierry, Count of Flanders House of Alsace Born: c. 1099 Died: 17 January 1168
Preceded by William Clito	Count of Flanders; 1128–1168	Succeeded by Philip I
