= Hautecombe Abbey =

Abbey in France

Coordinates: 45°45′10″N 5°50′22″E

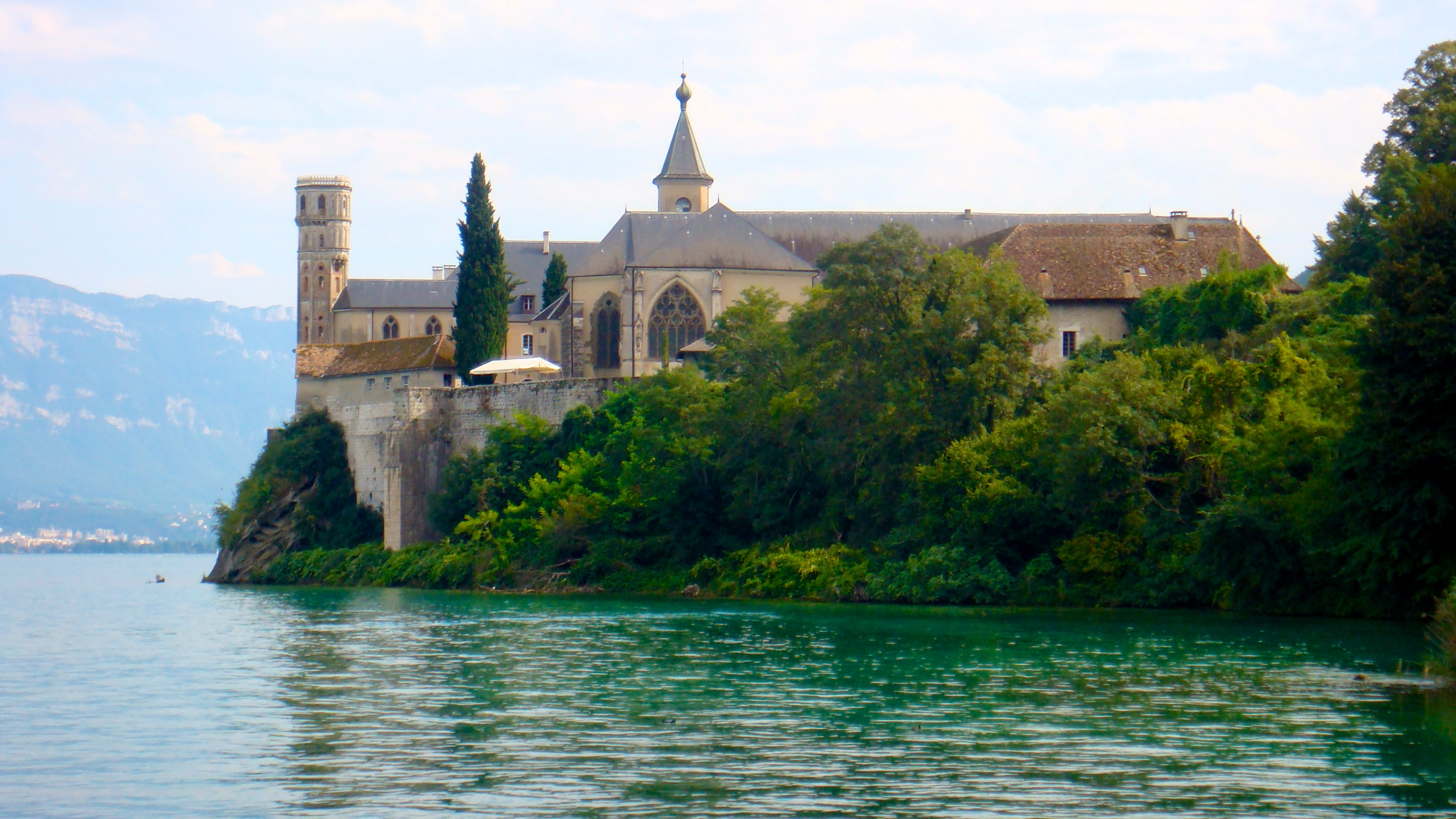
- Interactive map of Hautecombe Abbey

Monastery information
- Other names: Abbaye Royale d'Hautecombe; Abbazia Reale di Altacomba
- Order: Benedictine
- Established: c. 1101
- Disestablished: 1790–1826
- Mother house: Clairvaux (1125–1790); Consolata (1826–1864); Sénanque (1864–1922); Solesmes (1922–1992)
- Dedication: Mary, Saint Irene, Saint Andrew the Apostle
- Diocese: Roman Catholic Archdiocese of Chambéry–Saint-Jean-de-Maurienne–Tarentaise

People
- Founder: Amadeus III, Count of Savoy

Architecture
- Heritage designation: Monument historique

Site
- Location: Saint-Pierre-de-Curtille, Savoy, France
- Website: Hautecombe Abbey

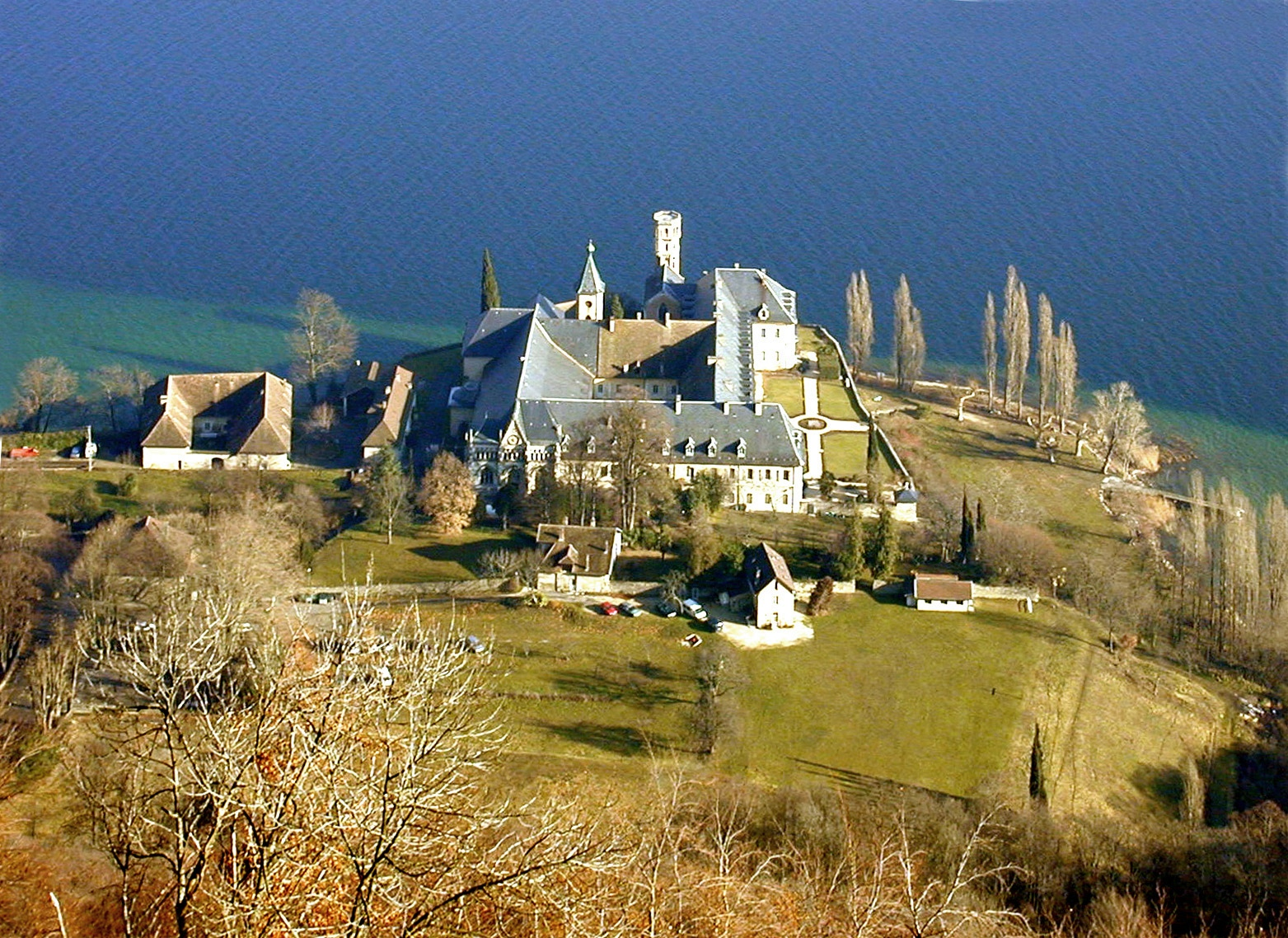
Hautecombe Abbey on the shores of the Lac du Bourget

Hautecombe Abbey (French: Abbaye d'Hautecombe, pronounced [abe.i dotkɔ̃b]; Latin: Altaecumbaeum) is a former Cistercian monastery, later a Benedictine monastery, in Saint-Pierre-de-Curtille in Savoie, France. For centuries it was the burial place of the members of the House of Savoy. It is visited by 150,000 tourists annually.

== History ==
The origins of Hautecombe lie in a religious community which was founded about 1101 in a narrow valley (or combe) near Lake Bourget by hermits from Aulps Abbey, near Lake Geneva. In about 1125 it was transferred to a site on the north-western shore of the lake under Mont du Chat, which had been granted to it by Amadeus III, Count of Savoy, who is named as the founder; and shortly afterwards it accepted the Cistercian Rule from Clairvaux.

The first abbot was Amadeus de Haute-Rive, afterwards Bishop of Lausanne. Two daughter-houses were founded from Hautecombe at an early date: Fossanova Abbey (afterwards called For Appio), in the diocese of Terracina in Italy, in 1135, and San Angelo de Petra, close to Constantinople, in 1214.

It has sometimes been claimed, but has often been disputed, that Pope Celestine IV and Pope Nicholas III were monks at Hautecombe.

It was at Hautecombe that for centuries the Counts and Dukes of Savoy were buried. Count Humbert III, known as "Blessed", and his wife Anne were interred there in the latter part of the 12th century; and about a century later Boniface of Savoy, Archbishop of Canterbury (1245–1270), son of Count Thomas I of Savoy, was buried in the sanctuary of the abbey church. Aymon, Count of Savoy financed the expansion of a burial chapel at Hautecombe which was constructed from 1331 to 1342.

The abbot Anthony of Savoy, a son of Charles Emmanuel I, was also buried there in 1673.

The abbey was restored (in a debased style) by one of the dukes about 1750, but it was secularized and sold in 1792, when the French entered Savoy, and was turned into a china-factory. King Charles Felix of Sardinia purchased the ruins in 1824, had the church re-constructed by the Piedmontese architect Ernest Melano in an exuberant Gothic-Romantic style, and restored it to the Cistercian Order. He and his queen, Maria Christina of the Two Sicilies, are buried in the Belley chapel, which forms a kind of vestibule to the church. Some 300 statues and many frescoes adorn the interior of the church, which is 66 metres (217 ft) long, with a transept 26 metres (85 ft) wide. Most of the tombs are little more than reproductions of the medieval monuments.

In 1826 the Cistercians resettled the abbey from Turin, but the Italian monks soon left, and were replaced by others from Sénanque Abbey, who remained until about 1884. In 1922 the premises were taken over by the Benedictines of Priory of St. Madeleine in Marseilles. The benedictine monks left in 1992 for Ganagobie Abbey in the Alpes-de-Haute-Provence, primarily to get away from the increasing tourist flow. The buildings are now administered by the Chemin Neuf Community, a charismatic Catholic group with an "ecumenical vocation".
