= Mahaut of Albon =

Countess Consort of Savoy

- Born: 1112
- Died: 1148 (aged 35–36)
- Noble family: House of Albon
- Spouse: Amadeus III, Count of Savoy
- Issue more...: Matilda, Queen of Portugal; Humbert III, Count of Savoy
- Father: Guigues III of Albon
- Mother: Matilda

Mahaut of Albon (1112–1148), was a Countess consort of Savoy by marriage to Amadeus III, Count of Savoy.

== Life ==
Mahaut was the eldest daughter of Guigues III of Albon and Matilda of Hauteville. A marriage was arranged as an alliance with the counts of Geneva and her own family. She married Amadeus III in 1135.

Mahaut is noted as the countess of Savoy when she acted as a donor to the convent in Ripalta on 9 January 1137. She made donations to other convents, such as the convent of San Maurizio d'Agauno in 1143. When she gave birth to an heir in 1136, Savoy was spared a succession crisis. Because of her marriage alliance, her father assisted her spouse in the military expedition in Grésivaudan in 1140, and died in battle in 1142. Mahaut died prior to the departure of her spouse in the Second crusade.

== Legacy ==
According to tradition, she was the founder of the charity establishment Pain de mai, which provided food to people during famine.

== Issue ==
Mahaut and Amadeus had:

1. Matilda (1125–1158), married king Afonso I of Portugal
2. Agnes of Savoy (1125–1172), married William I, Count of Geneva
3. Humbert III (1136–1188)
4. John of Savoy
5. Peter of Savoy
6. William of Savoy
7. Margaret of Savoy (died 1157), founded and joined the nunnery Bons in Bugey
8. Isabella of Savoy
9. Juliana of Savoy (died 1194), abbess of St. André-le-Haut

== Sources ==
- Previte-Orton, C.W. (1912). The Early History of the House of Savoy: 1000-1233. Cambridge University Press.

Preceded by Adelaide, Countess consort of Savoy	Countess of Savoy; 1134–1148	Succeeded by Faidiva of Toulouse
