= Gertrude of Flanders, Countess of Savoy =

Gertrude of Flanders (1135–1186) was a Countess Consort of Savoy by marriage to Humbert III, Count of Savoy.

She was the daughter of Thierry, Count of Flanders, and his second wife Sibylla of Anjou. In 1155, she married Humbert III, Count of Savoy, but he divorced and imprisoned her in 1163. She was freed thanks to Robert, bishop of Cambrai, and returned to the court of her brother, Philip of Flanders. She then returned to Flanders.

She remarried Hughues d'Oisy in 1168; the marriage was annulled in 1173, and she retired to a convent. She had no children. In 1177, she agreed to abstain for her right to Flanders in favor of her sister Margaret I, Countess of Flanders.

Preceded by Faidiva of Toulouse	Countess of Savoy; 1155–1162	Succeeded by Clementia of Zähringen
