= Amadeus III of Savoy =

Count of Savoy from 1103 to 1148

Amadeus III
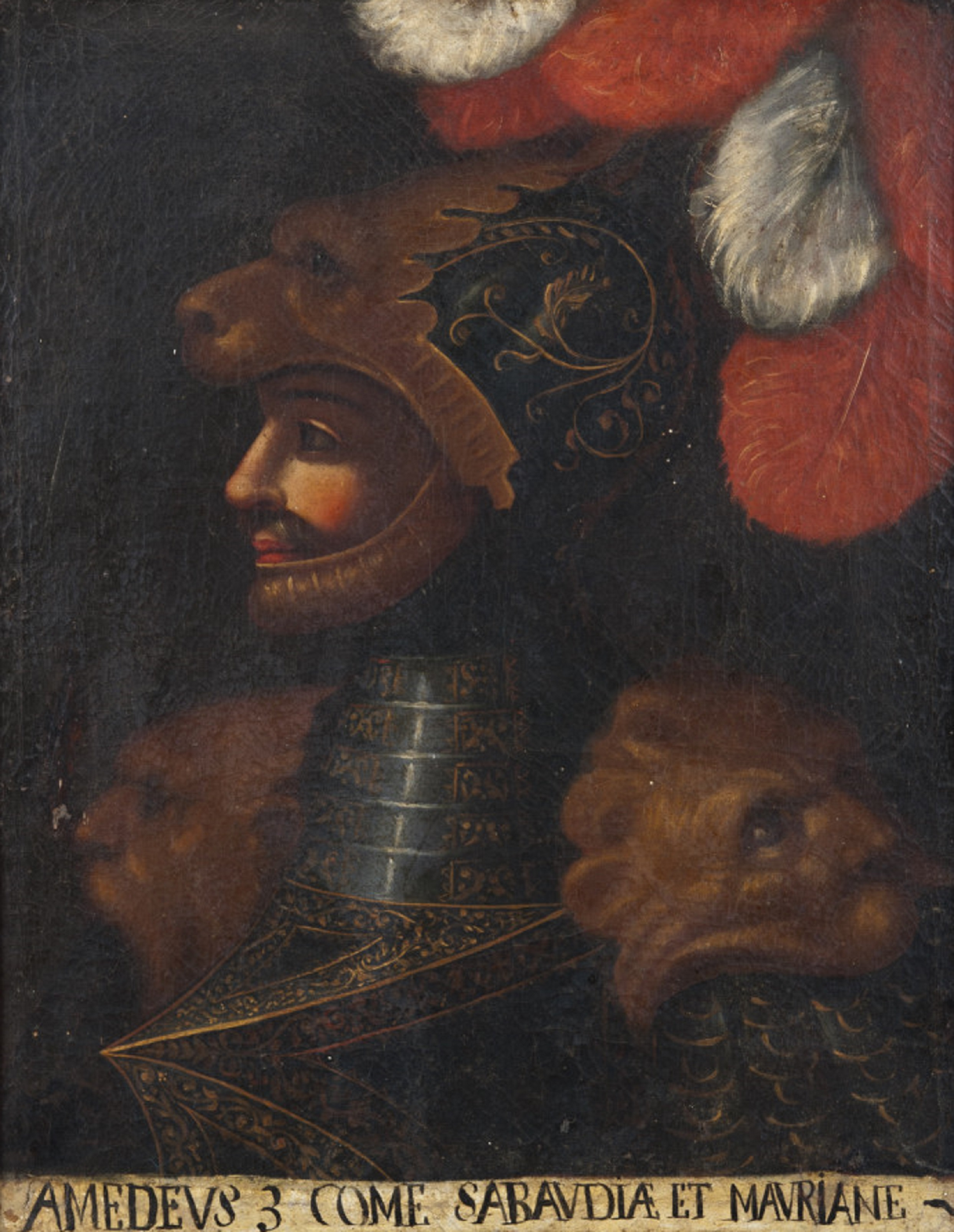

Count of Savoy
- Reign: 1103-1148
- Predecessor: Humbert II
- Successor: Humbert III
- Born: 1095; Carignano
- Died: April 1148 (aged 52–53); Nicosia
- Buried: Church of St. Croix in Nicosia
- Noble family: Savoy
- Spouses: Adelaide; Mahaut of Albon
- Issue more...: Matilda, Queen of Portugal; Humbert III, Count of Savoy
- Father: Humbert II, Count of Savoy
- Mother: Gisela of Burgundy

Amadeus III of Savoy (1095 – April 1148) was Count of Savoy and Maurienne from 1103 until his death. He was also known as a crusader.

== Biography ==
He was born in Carignano, Piedmont, the son of Humbert II of Savoy and Gisela of Burgundy, the daughter of William I of Burgundy. He succeeded as Count of Savoy upon the death of his father. Amadeus had a tendency to exaggerate his titles, and also claimed to be Duke of Lombardy, Duke of Burgundy, Duke of Chablais, and vicar of the Holy Roman Empire, the latter of which had been given to his father by Henry IV, Holy Roman Emperor.

He helped restore the Abbey of St. Maurice of Agaune, in which the former kings of Burgundy had been crowned, and of which he himself was abbot until 1147. He also founded the Abbey of St. Sulpicius in Bugey, Tamié Abbey in the Bauges, and Hautecombe Abbey on the Lac du Bourget.

In 1128, Amadeus extended his realm, known as the "Old Chablais", by adding to it the region extending from the Arve to the Dranse d'Abondance, which came to be called the "New Chablais" with its capital at Saint-Maurice. Despite his marriage to Mahaut, he still fought against his brother-in-law Guy, who was killed at the Battle of Montmélian. Following this, King Louis VI of France, married to Amadeus' sister Adélaide de Maurienne, attempted to confiscate Savoy. Amadeus was saved by the intercession of Peter the Hermit, and by his promise to participate in Louis' planned crusade.

== Crusade ==
In 1147, he accompanied his nephew Louis VII of France and his wife Eleanor of Aquitaine on the Second Crusade. He financed his expedition with help from a loan from the Abbey of St. Maurice. In his retinue were many barons from Savoy, including the lords of Faucigny, Seyssel, La Chambre, Miolans, Montbel, Thoire, Montmayeur, Vienne, Viry, La Palude, Blonay, Chevron-Villette, Chignin, and Châtillon. Amadeus travelled south through Italy to Brindisi, where he crossed over to Durazzo, and marched east along the Via Egnatia to meet Louis at Constantinople in late 1147. After crossing into Anatolia, Amadeus, who was leading the vanguard, became separated from Louis near Laodicea, and Louis' forces were almost entirely destroyed.

Marching on to Adalia, Louis, Amadeus, and other barons decided to continue to Antioch by ship. On the journey, Amadeus fell ill on Cyprus, and died at Nicosia in April 1148. He was buried in the Church of St. Croix in Nicosia. In Savoy, his son Humbert III succeeded him, under the regency of bishop Amadeus of Lausanne.

== Family and children ==
With his first wife Adelaide, he had:

- Adelaide, married Humbert III of Beaujeu

In 1123 he married Mahaut of Albon, daughter of Guigues III of Albon, they had:

- Matilda (1125–1158), married king Afonso I of Portugal
- Agnes (1125–1172), married William I, Count of Geneva
- Humbert III (1136–1188)
- John
- Peter
- William
- Margaret (died 1157), founded and joined the nunnery Bons in Bugey
- Isabella
- Juliana (died 1194), abbess of St. André-le-Haut

== Sources ==
- Previte-Orton, C.W. (1912). The Early History of the House of Savoy: 1000-1233. Cambridge University Press.
- Suger (2018). Selected Works of Abbot Suger of Saint Denis. Translated by Whitmore, Eric; Cusimano, Richard. Catholic University of America Press.

Amadeus III of Savoy House of Savoy Born: 1095 Died: 1148
Regnal titles
Preceded by Humbert II	Count of Savoy; 1103–1148	Succeeded by Humbert III
