= Margaret of Burgundy, Countess of Savoy =

Countess of Savoy (1192–1243)

Marguerite of Burgundy
- Born: 1192
- Died: 1243 (aged 50–51)
- Noble family: House of Burgundy
- Spouse: Amadeus IV, Count of Savoy
- Issue: Beatrice of Savoy, Marchioness of Saluzzo; Margurite of Savoy
- Father: Hugh III, Duke of Burgundy
- Mother: Béatrice of Albon

Marguerite of Burgundy (referred to as Anne by some sources; 1192–1243), was Countess of Savoy from 1233 until her death by marriage to Amadeus IV, Count of Savoy. She was the youngest daughter of Hugh III, Duke of Burgundy, and his second wife, Béatrice of Albon.

== Life ==
Around 1217, she married Amadeus IV, Count of Savoy. As dowry, she brought Miribel Castle, Ornacieux Castle, and other properties in Viennois territory. The marriage was agreed to as part of a treaty between the families, including terms not to acquire further territories within each other's dominions. She and her new husband were also designated as heirs for her brother, Guigues VI of Viennois after any children of his. However, this peace between the families did not last long, with conflict resuming by 1228.

She also personally inherited some money upon the death of her mother. The 1267 will of her nephew, Guigues VII of Viennois confirmed donations of property which she had made.

Note that some scholars are unclear on Marguerite's given name. A book about the House of Savoy at this time mentions the debate regarding her name, but finds a source which Cox finds settles the debate.

== Issue ==
Marguerite and Amadeus had two daughters:

- Beatrice of Savoy (d. 1258), married firstly in 1233 to Manfred III of Saluzzo (d. 1244), married secondly on April 21, 1247, to Manfred of Sicily
- Margaret of Savoy (d. 1254), married firstly on December 9, 1235, to Boniface II of Montferrat, married secondly to Aymar III, Count of Valentinois

== Notes ==
Margaret of Burgundy, Countess of Savoy House of Burgundy Born: 1192 Died: 1243
Preceded by Margaret of Geneva	Countess consort of Savoy; 1233–1243	Succeeded by Cecile of Baux
