= Beatrice of Savoy, Marchioness of Saluzzo =

Marchioness of Saluzzo

Beatrice of Savoy
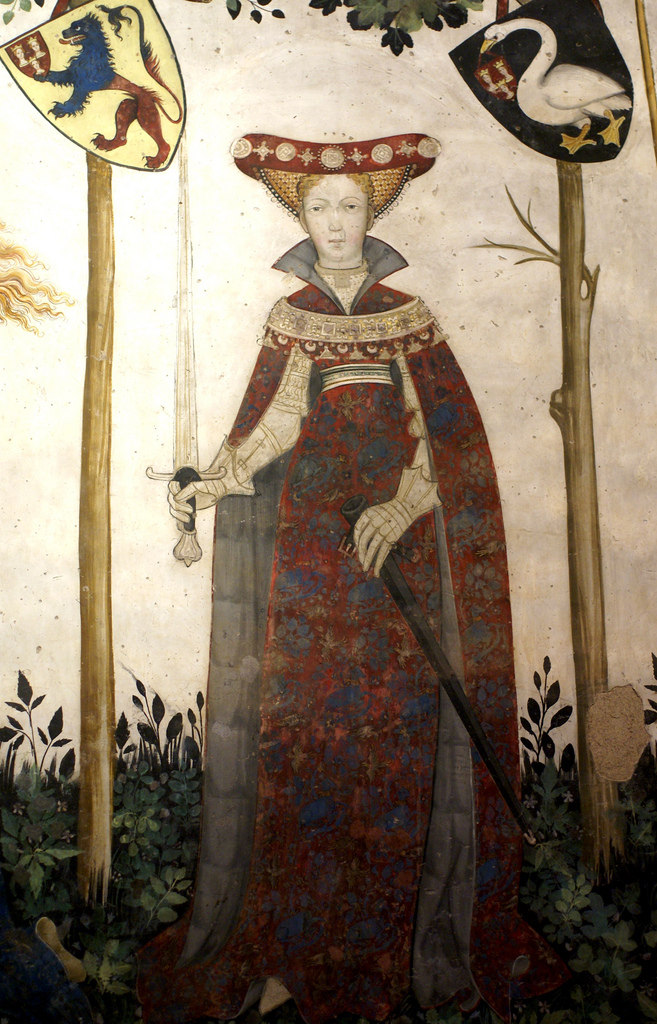
- Beatrice of Savoy as Hippolyte
- Born: before 4 March 1223
- Died: January 1258
- Spouse: Manfred III, Marquess of Saluzzo; Manfred, King of Sicily
- Issue: Thomas I, Marquess of Saluzzo; Constance II, Queen of Sicily
- House: House of Savoy
- Father: Amadeus IV of Savoy
- Mother: Marguerite of Burgundy

Beatrice of Savoy (before 4 March 1223 – January 1258) was Marchioness of Saluzzo by marriage to Manfred III, Marquess of Saluzzo, and Princess of Taranto by her second marriage to Manfred, the future King of Sicily. She was regent of Saluzzo during the minority of her son in 1244.

== Life ==
She was a daughter of Amadeus IV, Count of Savoy and his first wife Marguerite of Burgundy. She was a member of the House of Savoy by birth and by her first marriage she was Marchioness consort of Saluzzo.

Beatrice was the elder of two daughters; her younger sister Margaret was married to Boniface II, Marquess of Montferrat. After the death of their mother, their father married Cecile of Baux and had further children including Boniface, Count of Savoy and a younger Beatrice.

Beatrice was first betrothed not long after her birth on 4 March 1223 to Manfred III, Marquess of Saluzzo. However, the contract was broken off but was then renewed on 2 October 1227; a contract signed on that date refers to the dowry of Beatrice. The couple were married in March 1233. They were married for eleven years until Manfred's death in 1244, leaving Beatrice with two children and pregnant with twins. They had the following children:

1. Alice (c. 1236 – before 12 Jul 1311), married Edmund de Lacy, Baron of Pontefract and had issue
2. Thomas (1239–1296), succeeded Manfred as Marquess
3. Agnes (1245 – after 4 August 1265), married John, son of Eustace de Vesci, no issue
4. Margaret (born 1245), born posthumously, twin of Agnes

When her spouse died in 1244, Beatrice became the regent of Saluzzo during the minority of her son; however, she was forced to give up the regency to Boniface II, Marquis of Montferrat. Only two years after Manfred's death on 8 May 1246, Beatrice was betrothed a second time to a Manfred, an illegitimate son of Frederick II, Holy Roman Emperor by his mistress and possibly wife Bianca Lancia. Her marriage was arranged to recognize an alliance between Beatrice's father and Frederick. The couple were married by proxy in March 1247 and the marriage contract was signed on 21 April 1247. Manfred and Beatrice had one daughter, Constance (1249-1302) who went on to marry Peter III of Aragon and became queen regnant of Sicily in 1282.

In a testament from Beatrice's father dated 24 May 1253, the succession rights of Beatrice were bypassed in favor of her younger half-brother; the testament fails to mention Beatrice's second husband, possibly indicating a breakdown in the marriage.

Beatrice of Savoy died in January 1258. Her husband became King of Sicily in 1258 and went on to marry Helena Angelina Doukaina and father children with her.
