= Humbert I =

Humbert I or Umberto I may refer to:

- Humbert I of Salins (died 957/8)
- Humber I of Beaujeu (died 1016)
- Humbert I (bishop of Grenoble) (r. 976–1025)
- Humbert I (bishop of Valence) (r. 1027–1032)
- Humbert I, Count of Savoy (r. 1032–1047)
- Humbert I of Viennois (died 1307), dauphin
- Umberto I of Italy (r. 1878–1900)

== See also ==
- Humbert II
