= Pietro Ruffo =

Pietro Ruffo may refer to:

- Pietro Ruffo (cardinal) (fl. 1118–1120)
- Pietro I Ruffo (died 1257), count of Catanzaro
- Pietro II Ruffo (died 1309/10), count of Catanzaro
- Pietro Ruffo (artist) (born 1978)
