= Guigues VII of Viennois =

Guigues VII
- Dauphin of Viennois
- Born: 1225
- Died: 1269 (aged 43–44)
- Noble family: House of Burgundy
- Spouse: Beatrice of Savoy
- Issue: John; Andrew; Anne of Viennois
- Father: Guigues VI of Viennois
- Mother: Beatrice of Montferrat

Guigues VII (1225–1269), of the House of Burgundy, was the dauphin of Vienne and count of Albon, Grenoble, Oisans, Briançon, Embrun, and Gap from 1237 to his death. He was the son of Andrew Guigues VI and Beatrice of Montferrat. When his father died, his mother helped guide the leadership of the new Dauphin.

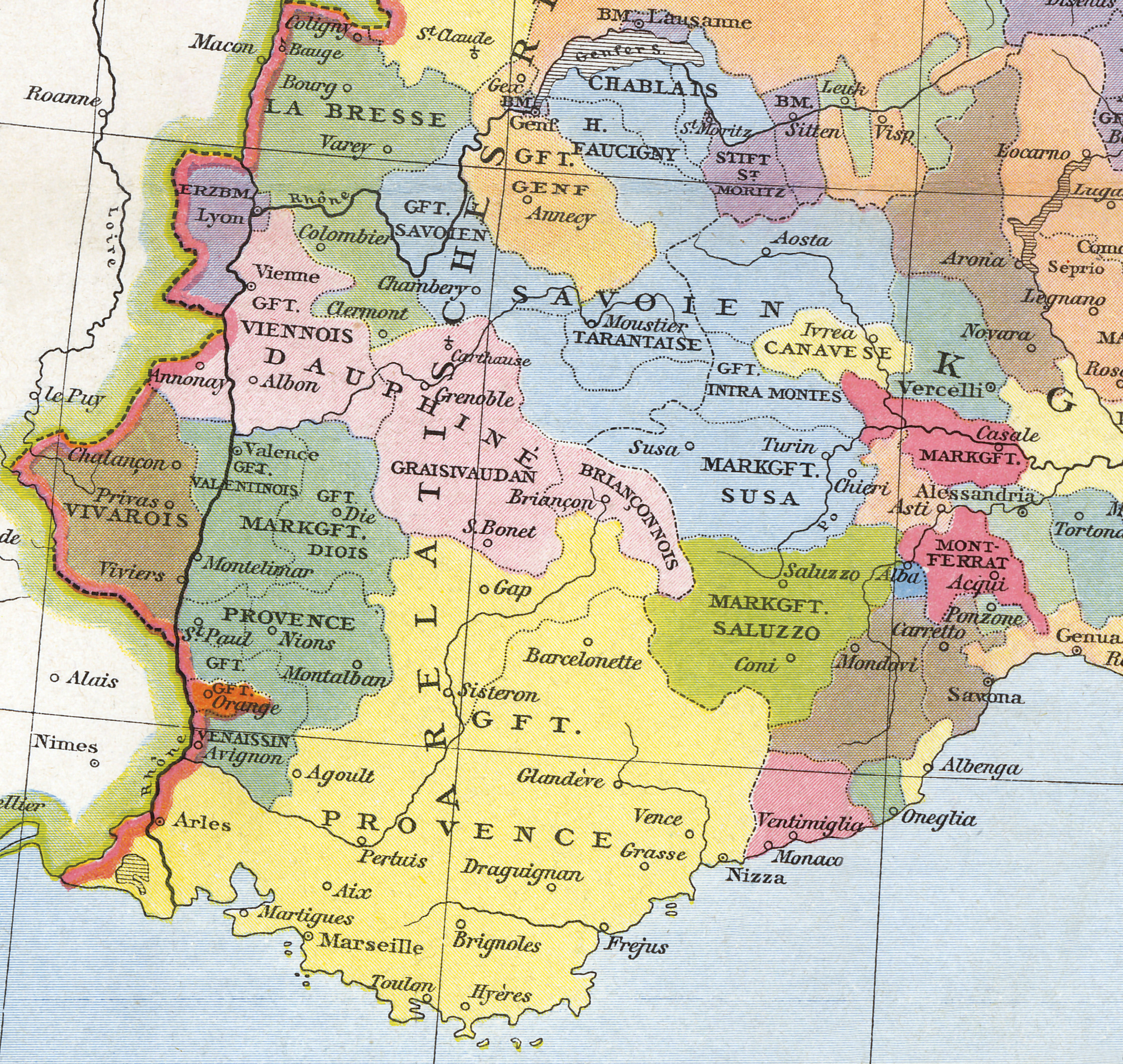
Dauphiné of Viennois (pink), within the Kingdom of Burgundy (Arles), under the suzerainty of the Holy Roman Empire

He fought great contests over the counties of Embrun and Gap with Charles, Count of Provence and Forcalquier. Those counties were the dowry of his father's first wife, Beatrice of Forcalquier. Guigues VI had repudiated his first wife and married a second, giving the counties of his former wife to the son of his second: Guigues VII. Charles, as heir to the county of Forcalquier, claimed the counties. A compromise was eventually reached whereby Guigues retained Embrun, but Charles received Gap.

In 1239, the young Dauphin entered negotiations to marry Cecile of Baux with the help of his ally, Raymond VII of Toulouse. Cecile's father, Barral later claimed that he only negotiated the engagement under threats against his life. In 1241, he became engaged to Beatrice of Savoy, daughter of Peter of Savoy and Agnes of Faucigny. Peter's brother, Philip agreed to help the Dauphin fight the count of Valentinois.

In 1247, Guigues was summoned by Frederick II, Holy Roman Emperor to join the army he was assembling in Savoy. This army was being gathered to attack the Pope in Lyon, though ultimately Frederick was distracted by other battles in Italy.

In 1253, Guigues married Beatrice (1237–1310). For her dowry, Beatrice brought Guigues Faucigny, a distant territory menacing Savoy, the traditional enemy of the Viennois. Many wars of Guigues' descendants would be aimed at the defence of this land from the Savoyard counts. Guigues had two sons and a daughter:

- John I (1264–1282), his successor
- Andrew (1267 – c. 1270)
- Anne (1255–1298), later successor, married in 1273 to Humbert de la Tour du Pin

== Sources ==
- Cox, Eugene L (1974). The Eagles of Savoy. Princeton, NJ.: Princeton University Press. ISBN 0691052166.
