= Boniface of Savoy =

Boniface of Savoy may refer to:

- Boniface, Count of Savoy (1244–1263)
- Boniface of Savoy (bishop) (1217–1270), Archbishop of Canterbury
