= Beatrice of Albon =

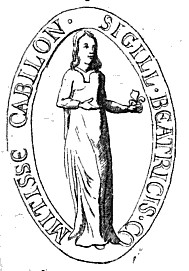

Countess of Albon and Dauphine of Viennois
- Reign: 1162–1228
- Predecessor: Guigues V of Albon
- Successor: Guigues VI of Viennois
- Regent: Margaret of Mâcon

Duchess Consort of Burgundy
- Reign: 1183–1192
- Born: 1161
- Died: 16 December 1228 (aged 66–67); Vizille
- Spouse: Hugh III, Duke of Burgundy
- Issue: Guigues VI of Viennois; Mahaut; Margaret of Burgundy
- House: Burgundy
- Father: Guigues V of Albon

Béatrice, Countess of Albon and Dauphine of Viennois (1161–1228) was ruling countess and dauphine in 1162–1228, in succession upon the death of her father Guigues V.

She married Hugh III, Duke of Burgundy in 1183 and had three children:

- André Guigues VI (1184–1237), Dauphin of Viennois
- Mahaut (1190–1242), married in 1214 John I, Count of Châlon and Auxonne (1190–1267)
- Marguerite (1192–1243), married c. 1217 Amadeus IV, Count of Savoy (1197–1253), Count of Savoy

Preceded by Guigues V of Albon	Countess Regnant of Albon and Dauphine of Viennois; 1162–1228	Succeeded by Guigues VI of Viennois
Preceded by Alice of Lorraine	Duchess Consort of Burgundy; 1183–1192	Succeeded by Infanta Teresa, Countess of Flanders
