= List of counts of Albon and dauphins of Viennois =

Coat of arms of the Dauphins of Viennois

The counts of Albon (French: comtes d'Albon) were medieval counts of Albon in the Kingdom of Burgundy, in what is now south-eastern France. Their title was derived from the Château d'Albon. From the end of the 13th century, they were also styled as dauphins of Viennois (French: dauphins de Viennois). In 1349, the last local dauphin sold his domains and titles to the House of Valois. Over time, by the 15th century, the title Dauphin of Viennois gradually evolved into the Dauphin of France.

== History ==
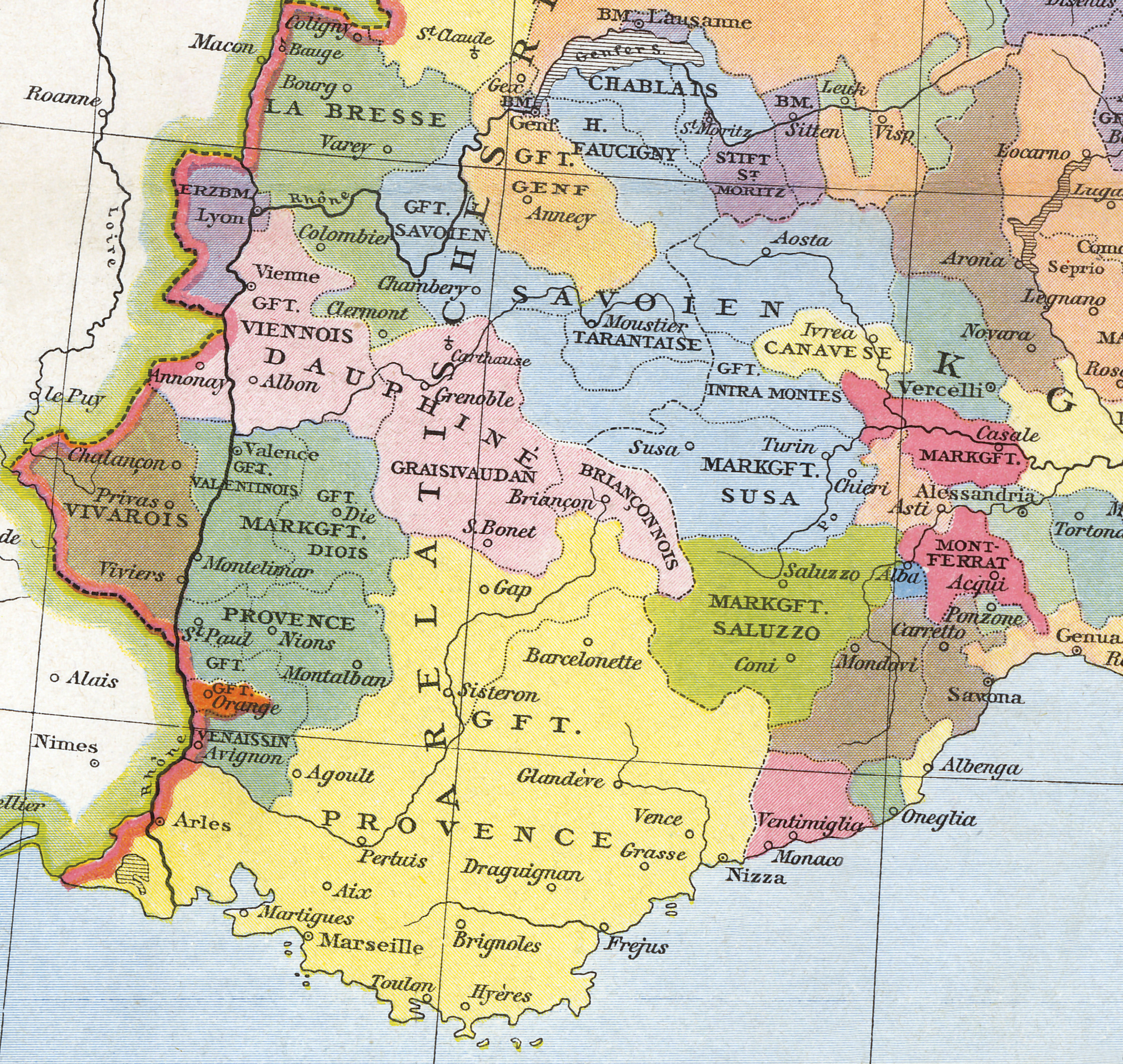
Albon in Viennois, within the Dauphiné (pink), in the middle of the 13th century

The region of Viennois, including Albon, belonged to the Kingdom of Burgundy (Arles), since 1032 under the suzerainty of the Holy Roman Empire. By the 12th century, counts of Albon gained prominence among the local nobility in Viennois. Count Guigues IV of Albon (d. 1142) was nicknamed le Dauphin or 'the Dolphin', and in time, his nickname morphed into a title among his successors. By 1285, the lands ruled by the counts of Albon, the old comitatus Albionis, were known as the Dauphiné of Viennois (Latin: Delphinatus Viennensis), but the city of Vienne itself was not in their possession, being governed by the Archbishops of Vienne until the middle of the 15th century.

In 1343, dauphin Humbert II of Viennois (d. 1355), being left childless after the death of his only son, and also being pressured by financial difficulties, decided to sell all of his possessions, titles and rights over Dauphiné. Neither the emperor, nor the pope wanted to buy, and thus a series of complex negotiations were initiated between Humbert and the House of Valois, headed by the ruling French king Philip VI. It was initially agreed that Humbert's domains will pass to Philip's younger som Philip, Duke of Orléans, but already in 1344, those provisions were changed, and a new agreement was made, designating kings's oldest son John, Duke of Normandy as Humbert's heir in the Dauphiné.

By 1349, dauphin Humbert II decided to finalize the sale of his domains. The acquisition was formalized by the treaty of Romans, designating John's oldest son Charles (future king Charles V) as Humbert's successor, on the condition that Dauphiné will remain a distinctive polity, not incorporated into the French kingdom. Thus in the summer of 1349 (16 July), young French prince Charles became the first Valois Dauphin of Viennois. In 1350, when John ascended to the French throne, his son Charles became the heir presumptive and thus for the first time both honors (Dauphin of Viennois, and heir to the French throne) were held by the same person. Under provisions of the treaty, it was also stipulated that the heir apparent to the French throne shall always be personal holder of those lands, and thus styled as Dauphin of Viennois. When the king of France had no son, he would personally rule the Dauphiné separately, as dauphin.

Thus, the province formally remained within the Holy Roman Empire even after 1349, and already in 1356 the first Valois dauphin Charles made an homage to the emperor Charles IV at Metz, and received imperial confirmation as feudal lord of Dauphiné, also being appointed as the imperial vicar in the region. In 1378, the emperor appointed the next dauphin Charles (future king Charles VI) as the imperial vicar in the region, but only for his lifetime. In 1456-1467, during the reign of king Charles VII of France, ties between Dauphiné and the French crown were strengthened, but the province continued to be administered separately from the French realm well into the early modern period. It was de facto incorporated into France only with the rise of absolutism in the 17th century.

By the middle of the 15th century, during the reign of dauphin Louis II (future king Louis XI), counties of Diois and Valentinois were finally integrated into Dauphiné.

In time, since the 15th century, the title Dauphin of Viennois gradually morphed into the Dauphin of France.

== Lords of Château d'Albon ==
=== House of Albon ===
- Guigues I of Albon the Old (c. 1000–1070), Count in Oisans, Grésivaudan and Briançonnais, Lord of Château d'Albon, ruled until 1070
- Guigues II of Albon the Fat (c. 1020–1079), Count in Grésivaudan and Briançonnais, Lord of Château d'Albon, ruled 1070–1079

== Counts of Albon ==
=== House of Albon ===
- Guigues III of Albon the Count (c. 1050–1133), first Count of Albon (the southern part of the ancient County of Vienne; the northern part was granted to the first Count of Savoy), ruled 1079–1133
- Guigues IV of Albon, le Dauphin (c. 1095–1142), Count of Albon, ruled 1133–1142

== Counts of Albon and Dauphins of Viennois ==
- Robert V, Count of Auvergne married Marquise d'Albon, a daughter of Guigues IV. Their descendants adopted the title of Dauphin of Auvergne, and it was used by some as the family name.

=== House of Albon ===
- Guigues V of Albon (c. 1120–1162), Count of Albon and Grenoble, Dauphin of Viennois, ruled 1142–1162
- Béatrice of Albon (1161–1228), Dauphine of Viennois, Countess of Albon, Grenoble, Oisans et Briançon, ruled 1162–1228, married Hugh III of Burgundy

=== House of Burgundy ===
- Guigues VI of Viennois (1184–1237), Dauphin of Viennois, count of Albon, Grenoble, Oisans and Briançon, ruled 1228–1237
- Guigues VII of Viennois (c. 1225–1269), Dauphin of Viennois, Count of Albon, Grenoble, Oisans, Briançon, Embrun and Gap, son of, ruled 1237–1269
- John I of Viennois (1263–1282), Dauphin of Viennois, Count of Albon, Grenoble, Oisans, Briançon and Embrun, ruled 1269–1282
- Anne of Viennois (1255–1298), Dauphine of Viennois, Countess of Albon, married Humbert, Baron of La Tour du Pin

=== House of La Tour du Pin ===
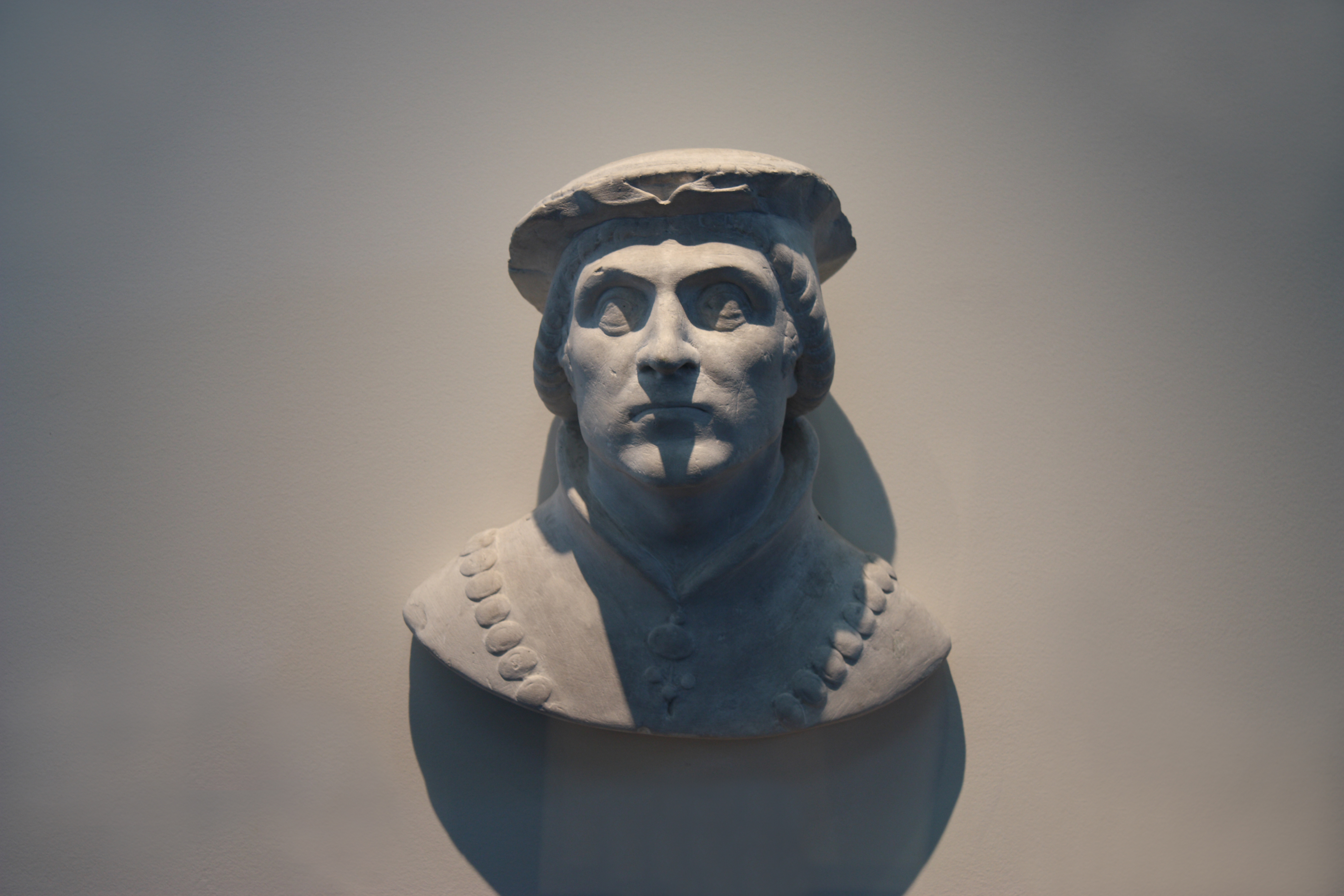
Humbert I of Viennois

- Humbert I of Viennois (c. 1240–1307), Baron of La Tour du Pin, Dauphin of Viennois and Count of Albon, ruled 1282–1307
- John II of Viennois (1280–1318), Baron of La Tour du Pin, Dauphin of Viennois, ruled 1307–1318
- Guigues VIII of Viennois (1309–1333), Dauphin of Viennois, ruled 1318–1333
- Humbert II of Viennois (1312–1355), Dauphin of Viennois, ruled 1333–1349

Humbert II sold his lands and titles to House of Valois.

=== Dauphins of Viennois from the House of Valois ===
- Charles I of Viennois (1338–1380), also king of France as Charles V, Dauphin of Viennois, Duke of Normandy, ruled the Dauphiné as prince (1349–1364), and then as king of France (1364–1368)
- Charles II of Viennois (1368–1422), also king of France as Charles VI, Dauphin of Viennois, ruled the Dauphiné as prince (1368–1380), and then as king of France (1380–1386, 1386–1392)
- Charles III of Viennois (1386), Dauphin of Viennois, ruled the Dauphiné as prince (1386)
- Charles IV of Viennois (1392–1401), Dauphin of Viennois, Duke of Guyenne, ruled the Dauphiné as prince (1392–1401)
- Louis I of Viennois (1397–1415), Dauphin of Viennois, Duke of Guyenne, ruled the Dauphiné as prince (1401–1415)
- John III of Viennois (1398–1417), Dauphin of Viennois, Duke of Touraine, ruled the Dauphiné as prince (1415–1417)
- Charles V of Viennois (1403–1461), also king of France as Charles VII, Dauphin of Viennois, ruled the Dauphiné as prince (1417–1422), and then as king of France (1422–1423, de facto 1457–1461)
- Louis II of Viennois (1423–1483), also king of France as Louis XI, Dauphin of Viennois, Count of Diois and Valentinois, ruled the Dauphiné as prince (1423–1461), and then as king of France (1461–1466)

== See also ==
- Dauphins of France
- Dauphins of Auvergne
- History of Burgundy
- French nobility

== Sources ==
- Fritz, Wolfgang D., ed. (2022) [1992]. Monumenta Germaniae Historica: Constitutiones et acta publica imperatorum et regum. Vol. 11. Wiesbaden: Harassowitz Verlag.
- Guiffrey, Jules (1868). Histoire de la réunion du Dauphiné à la France. Paris: Académie des bibliophiles.
- Kibler, William W.; Zinn, Grover A., eds. (2011) [1995]. Medieval France: An Encyclopedia. New York and London: Routledge.
- Wilson, Peter (2016). Heart of Europe: A History of the Holy Roman Empire. Cambridge: Harvard University Press.
