= Henri, Dauphin of Viennois =

French bishop (1296–1349)

Henri Dauphin (or Henri de la Tour du Pin) (1296–1349) was a bishop of Metz, France from 1319 to 1325.

== Biography ==
Henri was the son of Humbert I and Anne of Burgundy. In 1318 he succeeded as regent to the Dauphiné of Viennois, on behalf of his nephew Guigues VIII, and held that role until 1323.

Whilst bishop of Passau and despite never being ordained priest, he was named as the 68th bishop of Metz by pope John XXII on 4 May 1319 after the bishopric had been vacant for 3 years after the death of Reginald of Bar. He held this bishopric simultaneously with canon posts at Rouen, Vienne, Clermont, Romans, Saint Juste de Lyon and Cambrai and the post of archdeacon of Worcester.

In 1323 he engaged the château de Condé to Edward I, comte de Bar in the form of a vouerie, in lieu of the 6000 livres which he owed him. This debt had been contracted by Edouard's predecessor as comte de Bar, Renaud de Bar. In 1324 he had to return the château de Chatillon to Henry I, lord of Blamont, which Henry I had entrusted to his predecessor. As he was continually extracting money from the Metz diocese, it began to protest and Henri resigned the bishopric on August 25, 1325, took up his former seat, and withdrew to the Dauphiné. Louis of Poitiers succeeded him as bishop.
