= Beatrice of Savoy, Lady of Villena =

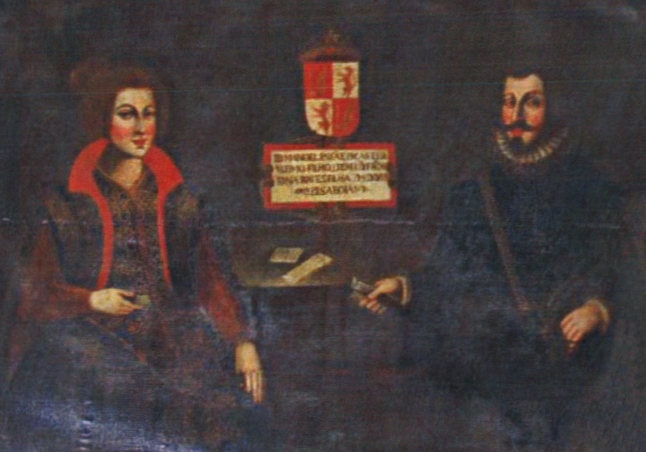
- Manuel of Castile and Beatrice of Savoy, in a 17th-century Portuguese painting series depicting the ancestors of the Manuel family (Ficalho Palace, Serpa, Portugal)
- Born: 1250
- Died: 1292 (aged 41–42)
- Spouse: Peter of Chalon; Manuel of Castile
- Issue: Juan Manuel
- House: Savoy
- Father: Amadeus IV, Count of Savoy
- Mother: Cecile of Baux

Beatrice of Savoy (1250–1292) was the daughter of Amadeus IV the Count of Savoy and his second wife, Cecile of Baux. She was a member of the House of Savoy by birth, by her second marriage she became known as Lady of Villena.

Beatrice was a full sister to Boniface, Count of Savoy, as well as two sisters Eleanor and Constance. She had two older half-sisters from her father's first marriage, an elder Beatrice and Margaret.

Upon the death of her father in 1253, Beatrice received an amount of money as an inheritance. Upon the death of her ten-year-old brother Count Boniface, he was succeeded by their uncle as Peter II, Count of Savoy. Upon Peter's death, Beatrice had to renounce her claim on Savoy along with the consent of her mother in favor of the succession of her other uncle as Philip I, Count of Savoy, in the article (dated 21 October 1268) she is referred to as Contesson possibly to distinguish her from her older half-sister of the same name. A charter dated 11 August 1266 by Pope Clement IV presumably tells of Count Philip donating property to his niece "B" most likely referring to Beatrice.

Beatrice was firstly betrothed to James, second son of James I of Aragon however, the contract was broken on 11 August 1266. Ten years after the betrothal was broken, James became King of Majorca.

Beatrice firstly married on 21 October 1268 to Peter of Chalon, Seigneur de Châtelbelin, son of Jean l'Antique. Peter granted property to his wife in 1269. The couple were married for no more than six years when Peter died, they had no children.

A second marriage in 1275 (Note: Between 20 July to 10 December 1275, according to Kinkade) took place with Manuel of Castile; this was a second marriage for both parties, Manuel's first wife Constance (sister to Beatrice's one-time fiancee James) had died leaving him with two children. Manuel and Beatrice had one son Juan Manuel who was born in Escalona on 5 May 1282. Manuel died a year after the birth of their son therefore he was succeeded by their son as Manuel's other son by Constance had died young. Beatrice cared for her son until her own death nine years later, after which time Juan Manuel was left in the care of his uncle, Sancho IV of Castile.

== Sources ==
- Kinkade, Richard P. (2004). "Beatrice Contesson of Savoy (c. 1250-1290): The Mother of Juan Manuel". La Corónica. 32 (3): 163–225. doi:10.1353/cor.2004.0017.
