= Guigues VI of Viennois =

Guigues VI
- Dauphin of Viennois
- Coat of Arms of Viennois
- Born: 1184
- Died: 14 March 1237 (aged 52–53)
- Noble family: House of Burgundy
- Spouses: Beatrice de Sabran; Beatrice of Montferrat
- Issue: Guigues VII of Viennois; Beatrice; John
- Father: Hugh III, Duke of Burgundy
- Mother: Beatrice of Albon

Andrew Guigues VI (1184 – 14 March 1237) was the dauphin of Viennois, count of Albon, Briançon, Grenoble, and Oisans from 1228 until his death. He was the son of Duke Hugh III of Burgundy and Countess Beatrice of Albon. He took his regnal name after and inherited the titles and lands of his maternal grandfather, Guigues V.

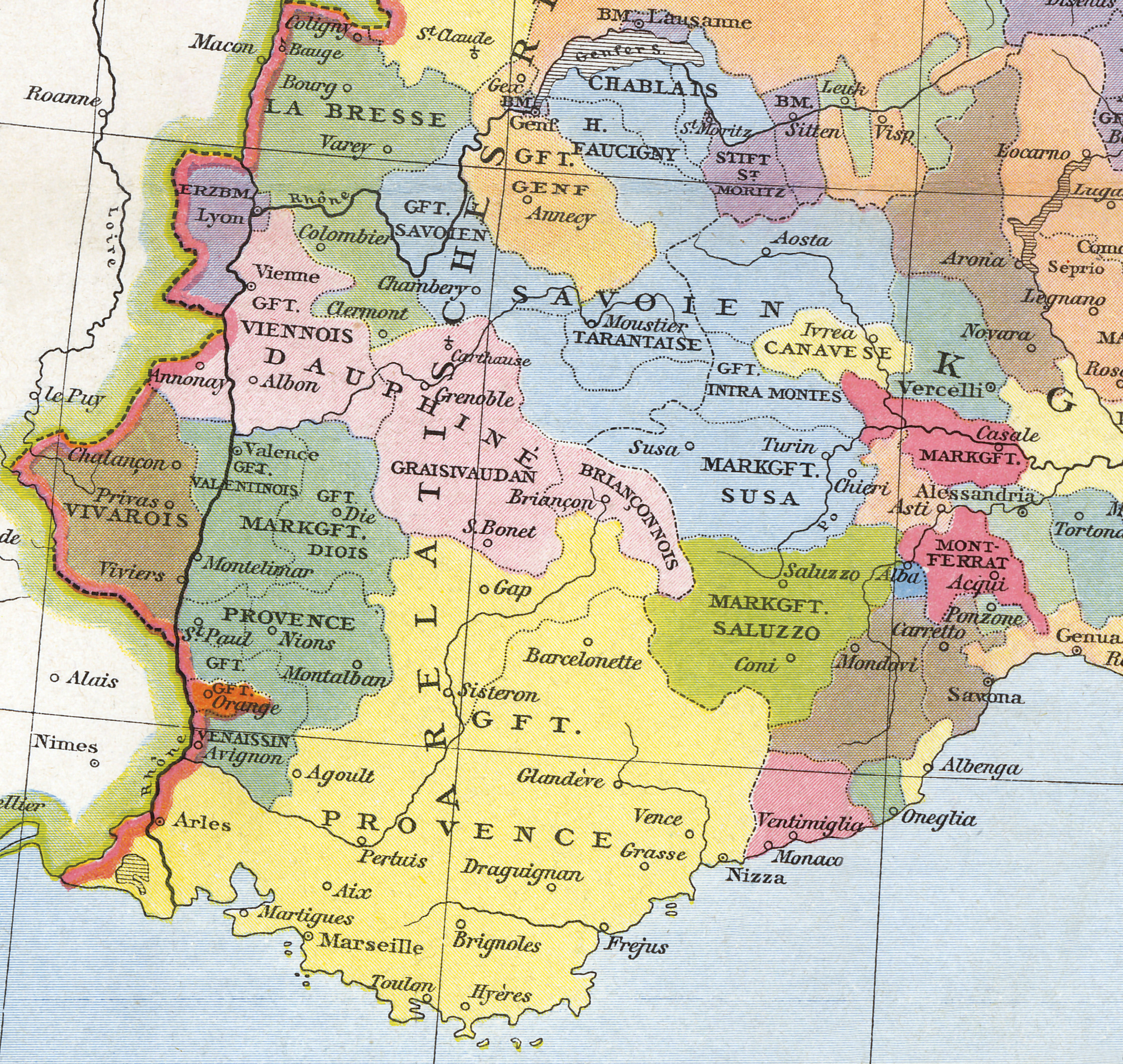
Dauphiné of Viennois (pink), within the Kingdom of Burgundy (Arles), under the suzerainty of the Holy Roman Empire

During his reign he was a generous patron of monasteries and he expanded his territory by diplomacy rather than war. He founded the collegiate church Saint-André of Grenoble, which is today the last existing monument built by the delphinal dynasty, and where he and some of his successors were buried.

In 1228, Guigues was supporting Turin in their attempts to trade without paying heavy duties to Count Thomas I of Savoy. This was despite the treaty that had been made between the families when Guigues's sister Margaret married the count's son and heir.

== Marriages ==
In 1202 he married Beatrice (1182 – before 1248), Countess of Gap and Embrun, daughter of Rainon I of Sabran. They had:

- Beatrice (born 1205) married Amaury de Montfort

In 1215 Guigues divorced Beatrice and on 15 November 1219 married Beatrice, daughter of William VI of Montferrat. She was the domna (lady) of the troubadour Gauseran de Saint Leidier. She bore Guigues two sons:

- Guigues VII (1225–1269)
- John (1227–1239)

== Sources ==
- Bouchard, Constance Brittain (1987). Sword, Miter, and Cloister: Nobility and the Church in Burgundy, 980–1198. Cornell University Press.
- Cox, Eugene L (1974). The Eagles of Savoy. Princeton, NJ.: Princeton University Press. ISBN 0691052166.
- Lemonde, Anne (2002). Le temps des libertés en Dauphiné l'intégration d'une principauté à la couronne de France, 1349-1408 (in French). Presses universitaires de Grenoble.
- Moreau, Gilles-Marie (2010). Le Saint-Denis des Dauphins : histoire de la collégiale Saint-André de Grenoble. Paris: L'Harmattan.
