= Guigues V of Albon =

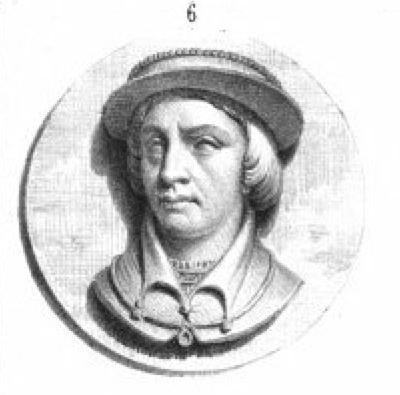
Guigues V of Albon in a 19th-century depiction.

Guigues V (c. 1125 – 29 July 1162) was the Count of Albon and Grenoble (then part of the Holy Roman Empire) from 1142 until his death. He was the first to take the title Dauphin du Viennois.

Guigues V was the son of Guigues IV, Count of Albon (1133–42), and Margaret of Mâcon. He inherited when he was considered too young to rule on his own and so his mother controlled the regency until 1153. In that year Guigues took the reins of government and immediately set about to avenge his father, who had been killed in a surprise attack by the Count of Savoy, Amadeus III, during the siege of Montmélian eleven years earlier. Guigues V besieged Montmélian a second time, but was driven off by Humbert's relief force. Peace was finally achieved by the intervention of the Bishop of Grenoble, Hugh II.

Two years later, on 13 January 1155, Guigues was in Rivoli, near Turin, to recognise the suzerainty of the Holy Roman Emperor, Frederick Barbarossa, for his lands. The emperor in return confirmed the count of Albon in the possession of certain territories his ancestors had acquired through litigation, and granted him a mint at Râme in the Embrunais and the right to mint coin in Cesana (in competition with the Savoyard mint at Susa).

Guigues died without male heirs at Vizille in 1162. He left a daughter, Beatrice, who inherited his lands and titles.

The identity of his wife, whom he married in 1155, is uncertain, other than that she was a kinswoman of Frederick Barbarossa, according to Chorier. (Note: Chorier, in his Histoire Générale de Dauphiné (1641, Grenoble, republished 1878, Valence, vol. I, p. 616) identified her as Beatrice, a daughter of William V of Montferrat, and also assigned to them a son who died young.) However, Usseglio has shown that Chorier had misdated a charter of Frederick II for one of Frederick I: the Beatrice of Montferrat in question was the daughter of William VI of Montferrat, and widow of Guiges V's grandson Guigues VI of Viennois. (Note: I Marchesi di Monferrato in Italia ed in Oriente durante i secoli XII e XIII (Casale Monferrato, 1926, vol. 1, pp. 167–69))

== Sources ==
- Cheyette, Fredric L. (2004). Ermengard of Narbonne and the World of the Troubadours. Cornell University Press.
- McKitterick, Rosamond; Abulafia, David, eds. (1999). The New Cambridge Medieval History: Volume 5, C.1198-c.1300. Cambridge University Press.
- Previté-Orton, C. W. (1912). The Early History of the House of Savoy, 1000–1233. Cambridge at the University Press.
