= Humbert II =

Humbert II may refer to:

- Humbert II of Savoy, Count of Savoy, 1080–1103
- Humbert II of Viennois, Dauphin of the Viennois, 1333–1349
- Umberto II of Italy, sometimes Humbert II, (1904–1983), of the House of Savoy, King of Italy

== See also ==
- Humbert I
