= Pietro I Ruffo =

Pietro I Ruffo (died 1257), anglicized Peter Rufus, was a nobleman and official in the Kingdom of Sicily. During the papal crusade against Emperor Frederick II, he was a loyal supporter of the king. After Frederick's death in 1250, he moved towards the papacy, took part in a failed military expedition, was stripped of his fiefs and assassinated.

== Family ==
Neither the date nor the place of Ruffo's birth are known. His family was of Norman origin. He probably belonged to the branch settled in Tropea, since he is sometimes given the surname de Calabria in documents. The author Giordano Ruffo was his nephew. Giordano and his brother Folco were often associated with him. Another relative, Guglielmo, became his trusted lieutenant in Sicily.

== Under Frederick II ==
Nothing is known of Ruffo's life before October 1239, when Emperor Frederick II put him in charge of the castle of Crotone. In January 1240, on account of his veterinary expertise, he was appointed overseer of the royal stables in Calabria. On 3 May, Frederick united the justiciarates of Sicily and appointed Ruffo justiciar of the whole island. Late in 1243 or early in 1244, he appointed Ruffo master of the imperial stable with authority over all royal stables in the kingdom. By March 1247, Ruffo was the imperial vicar in Calabria and Sicily.

In the following years, Ruffo accompanied the emperor in his wars against the Guelphs of northern and central Italy. According to the Jamsilla Chronicle, he became the emperor's most trusted advisor. He and his nephew Folco were witnesses of Frederick's final will and testament on 10 December 1250. After the emperor's death, his son Manfred sent Ruffo to Palermo to solicit an oath of loyalty from the people to their new sovereign, Conrad IV, and to remain there as tutor to Conrad's younger brother Henry. Ruffo took up residence in Messina, where by November 1251 he held the additional office of strategus. In Messina, Ruffo allied with the nobility against the merchant class. He threw in prison one of the merchant leaders, Leonardo Aldigerio, accused of plotting against him.

== After the death of Frederick II ==
In February 1252 at a parliament at Melfi, Conrad IV invested Ruffo with the county of Catanzaro and confirmed him as imperial vicar in Calabria and Sicily. When the young Henry died in early 1254, Ruffo encouraged Conrad to visit Sicily. The king died en route in May, leaving the kingdom to his son Conradin under the regency of Berthold von Hohenburg. By the autumn of 1254, Ruffo was the effectively independent ruler of Calabria and Sicily and permitted the agents of Frederick II's longtime, Pope Innocent IV, to operate there.

Ruffo presented himself as upholding the rights of Conradin against the usurpation of Manfred. He had, however, alienated the Messinese aristocracy, which allied with the townspeople to force him out by early 1255. Forced out of Calabria, he joined Pope Alexander IV in Naples. There he gathered an army and launched an invasion of Calabria by land and sea. His land force was diverted to Apulia to assist Cardinal Ottaviano degli Ubaldini. He landed at San Lucido in Calabria with his other army but could not take Cosenza and was forced to retreat.

In February 1256, Manfred held a court that stripped Ruffo of the county of Catanzaro. Ruffo fled to the Papal States but an assassin sent by Manfred killed him at Terracina in early 1257.

== Sources ==
- Caridi, Giuseppe (2017). "Ruffo, Pietro". Dizionario Biografico degli Italiani, Volume 89: Rovereto–Salvemini (in Italian). Rome: Istituto dell'Enciclopedia Italiana. ISBN 978-88-12-00032-6.
- Matthew, Donald (1992). The Norman Kingdom of Sicily. Cambridge University Press.
