= Giordano Ruffo =

Italian Nobleman (1200-1256)

Start of De Medicina Equorum in manuscript 701 of the Wellcome Collection

Giordano Ruffo or Jordanus Ruffus ( fl. 1200–1256) was an Italian nobleman known for one of the oldest works in veterinary medicine dealing with the horse and its diseases De Medicina Equorum.

Ruffo was born in Calabria around 1200 in a noble family serving Frederick II. An uncle was Pietro Ruffo, Count of Catanzaro. Shortly before the death of Frederick II, Ruffo, his brother Folco, and Pietro were called to sign a testament. Ruffo was made lord of Val di Crati in 1239 but after the death of Frederick II in 1250 they had to choose allegiance between two possible rulers and they chose Conrad IV and were against Manfredi, son of the Emperor and Bianca Lancia. The death of Conrad IV in 1254 led to the arrest of the Ruffo family and he was tortured, blinded, and died in prison around February 1256.

Ruffo's single book was written in Latin and is considered as one of the earliest works on veterinary medicine. The book had six parts covering reproduction; training of foals; maintenance; qualities and defects; diseases; and treatments. There are about 173 manuscript copies known of the work and about 16 print versions translated into Italian, Latin, French, German, Catalan, Galician, Occitan and Hebrew. The best known edition is Jordani Ruffi Calabriensis Hippiatria (Padua, 1818). Several later derivatives editions exist including Mulomedicina (or Medela equorum ) by Teodorico Borgognoni (late 13th century); Marescalcia by Dino Dini, Traité d'hippiatrie by Guillaume de Villiers (15th century); and Manuschansia by Agostino Colombre (1490).
