= Beatrice of Montferrat =

Coat-of-arms of Aleramici of Monferrat.

Beatrice of Montferrat (c.1210 – 1274) was an Italian noblewoman, the eldest daughter of William VI, Marquess of Montferrat, and the third wife of Guigues VI of Viennois, by whom she had two sons. According to the vida of the troubadour Gauseran de Saint-Leidier, Beatrice was the domna (lady), whom he allegedly loved. He celebrated his idealised devotion to her in his cansos.

== Family ==
Beatrice was born in about 1210, the eldest daughter and second child of William VI, Marquess of Montferrat and Berta of Clavesana. Her brother was Boniface II, Marquess of Montferrat, and her younger sister Alix married King Henry I of Cyprus.

Beatrice's paternal grandparents were Boniface I, Marquess of Montferrat and his first wife Helena del Bosco; her maternal grandparents were Marquess Boniface of Clavesana, Count of Cortemiglia and his wife who is unnamed.

== Marriages and issue ==
On 21 November 1219, at the age of about nine (or possibly younger), Beatrice married Guigues VI of Viennois. Their marriage was recorded in Aymari Rivalli De Allobrogibus. He was over twenty years her senior and she was his third wife. From 1228 until Guigues' death in 1237, as his wife, she was the Dauphine consort of Viennois as well as the Countess of Albon, Briançon, Grenoble and Oisans. Together they had two sons:

- Guigues VII of Viennois (1225–1269), married Beatrice of Savoy, by whom he had issue
- John of Viennois (1227–1239)

When her husband died in 1237, she help guide their eldest son during his early years as Dauphin.

Beatrice was immortalised as the domna of the troubadour Gauseran de Saint-Leidier, who extolled his idealised and unconsummated love for Beatrice in his cansos, of which only two are extant.

== Death ==
Beatrice died on an unrecorded date in 1274.
