= Gauseran de Saint-Leidier =

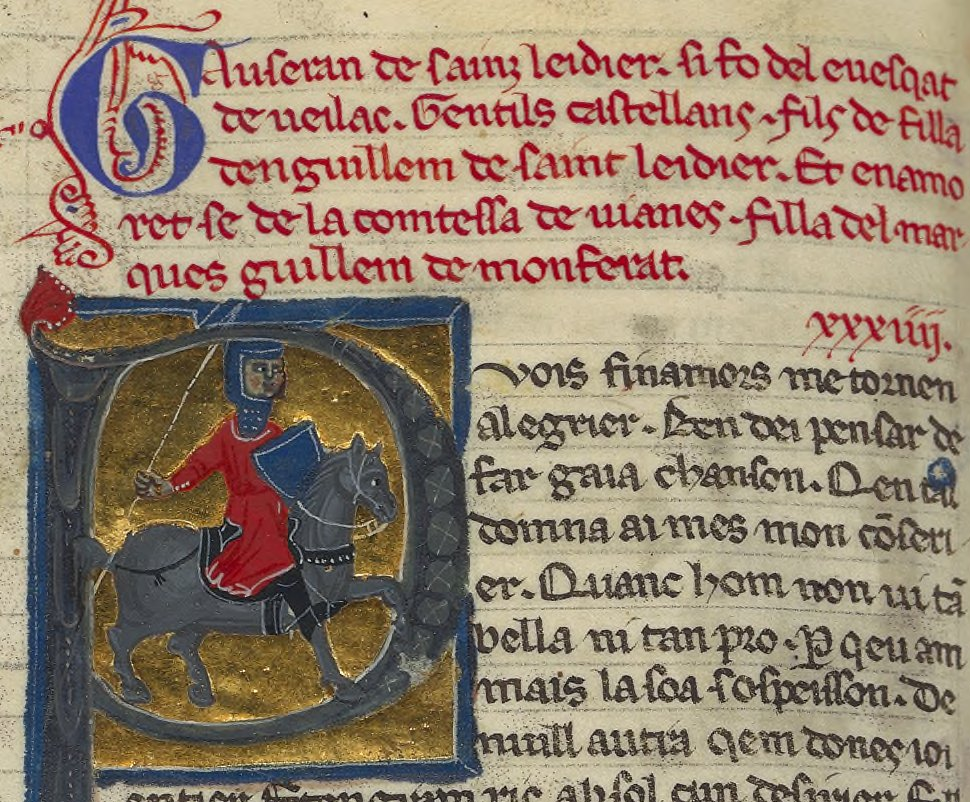
Gauseran's vida is the red text. He is the knight below.

Gauceran or Gauseran de Saint-Leidier was an Auvergnat castellan and troubadour from Saint-Didier-la-Séauve in the Bishopric of Velay. He was the son of a daughter of the troubadour Guilhem de Saint Leidier. According to his vida he fell in love with Beatrice, daughter of William VI of Montferrat and wife of Guigues VI of Viennois. Only two cansos (love songs) by Gauceran survive.
