= Anne of Viennois =

Countess of Viennois and Albon

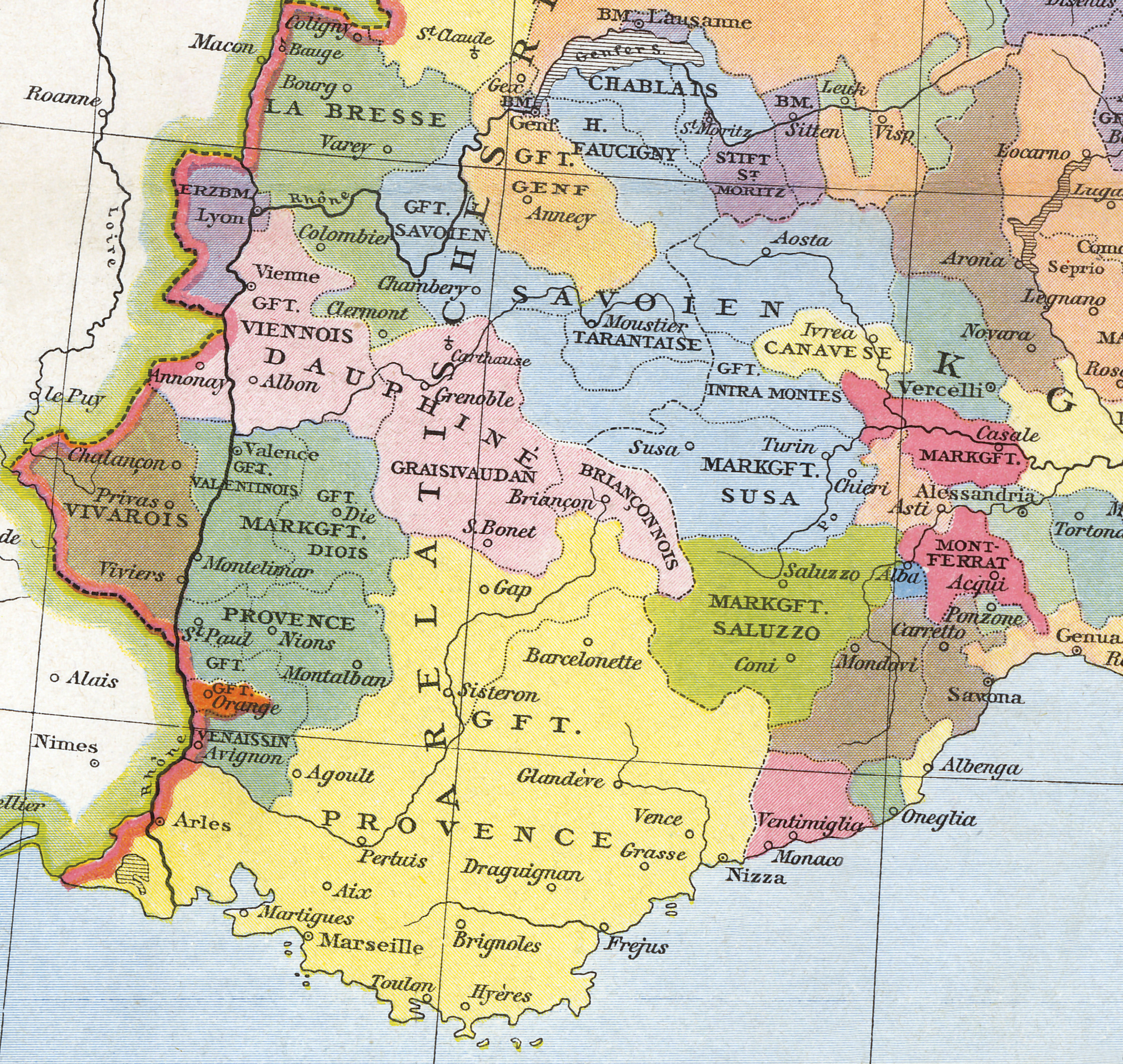
Dauphiné of Viennois (pink), within the Kingdom of Burgundy (Arles), under the suzerainty of the Holy Roman Empire

Anne of Viennois (died 1299), was a Countess regnant suo jure of Albon and Viennois from 1282 to 1299, and the daughter of Guigues VII of Viennois and Beatrice of Savoy, Dame of Faucigny. She married Humbert, Baron of La Tour du Pin in 1273. She was buried in the Carthusian monastery of Salette, in the barony of La Tour.

== Issue ==
- John II (1280 † 1319), succeeded his father as dauphin of Viennois
- Hugues († 1329), baron de Faucigny; married Marie of Savoy
- Guigues († 1319), seigneur de Montauban.
- Alix (1280 † 1309), married John I (1275 † 1333), count of Forez in 1296
- Marie, married Aymar de Poitiers-Valentinois
- Marguerite, married Frederick I († 1336), Marquis of Saluzzo in 1303
- Béatrice (1275 † 1347), married Hugh I of Chalon-Arlay in 1312
- Henri (1296 † 1349), bishop of Metz
- Catherine († 1337), married Philip of Savoy (1278 † 1334), count of Piedmont and prince of Achaea in 1312
