= König Manfred =

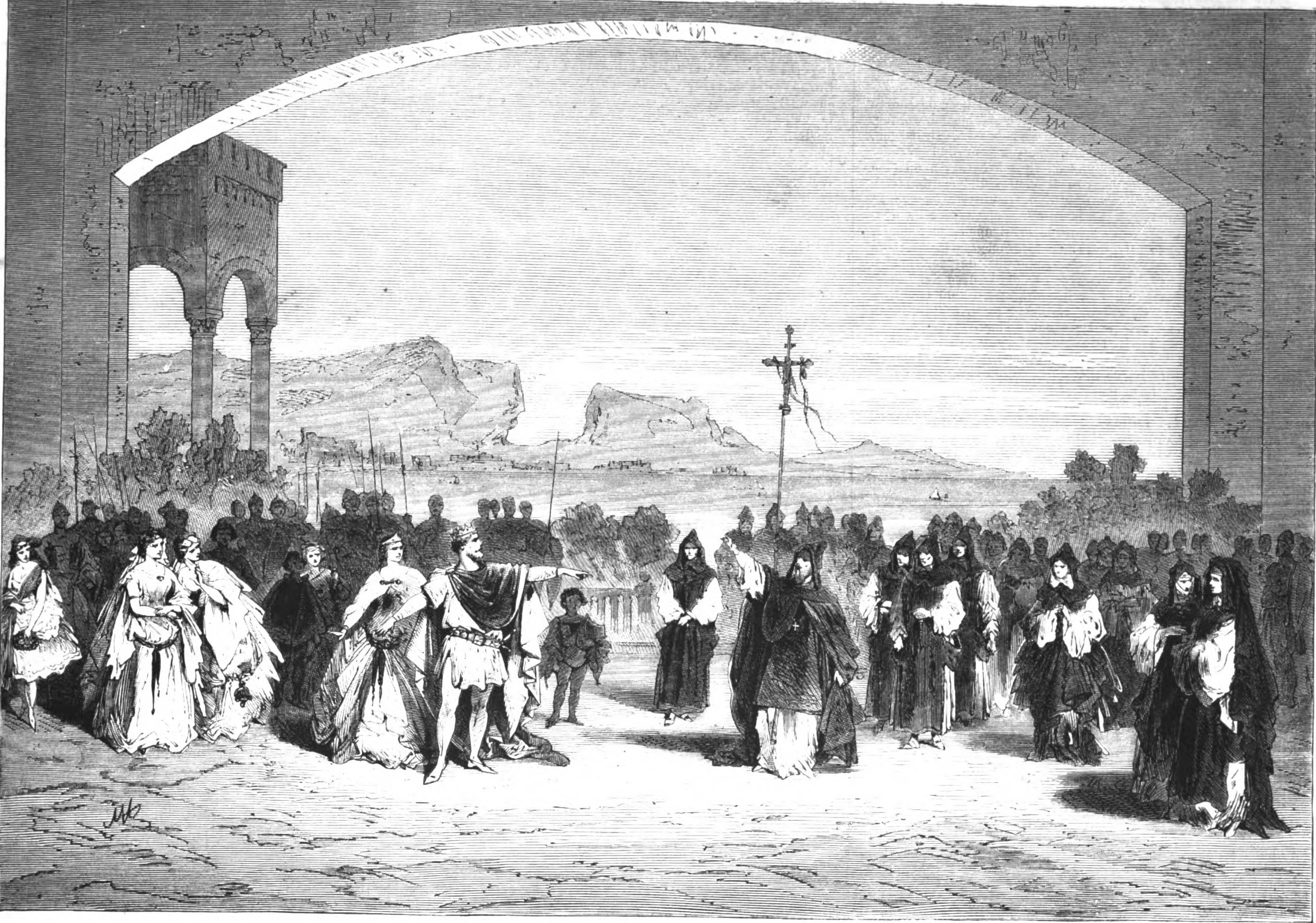
A scene from act III (1868 journal illustration)

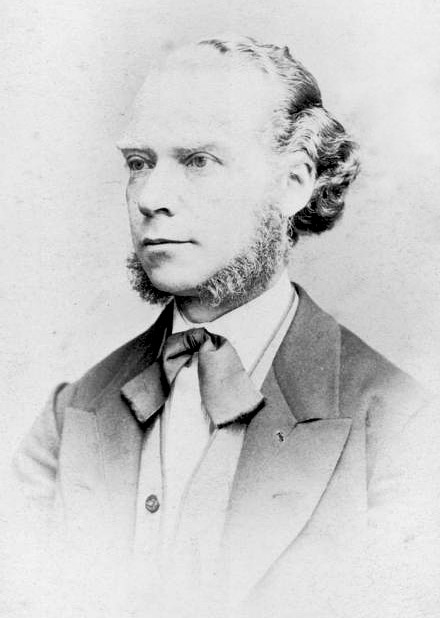
Carl Reinecke (1860s)

King Manfred (König Manfred), Op. 93 is a grand romantic opera in 5 acts by Carl Reinecke to libretto by Friedrich Roeber. It was composed in 1866 and staged in 1867.

== History ==
The music was composed from April to December 1866 in Leipzig, where Reinecke was already director of the Gewandhaus concerts and professor at the Leipzig Conservatory. The first performance took place at the Royal Court Theater of Wiesbaden on 26 July 1867 with Wilhelm Jahn as conductor. Although it was a huge success, the opera remained in repertoire only for a while (a printed libretto appeared as late as in 1881). The Overture and the Prelude to Act V were among Reinecke's most favorite compositions.

The full score of the opera was published by Breitkopf & Härtel in 1868, as well as the vocal score, prepared by composer himself. Several popular excerpts were published in different arrangements.

== Roles ==
Role		Voice type	Cast at the premiere
Charles of Anjou		—	
King Manfred		tenor	
Helen, his spouse		soprano	
Octavianus, legate and cardinal		bass	
Fulco	Apulian and Sicilian barons, banished by Manfred	tenor I	
Ruffo	Apulian and Sicilian barons, banished by Manfred	tenor II	
Borello	Apulian and Sicilian barons, banished by Manfred	baritone	
Fasanella	Apulian and Sicilian barons, banished by Manfred	baritone	
Annibaldi	Apulian and Sicilian barons, banished by Manfred	bass	
Ghismonda, a nun		soprano	
Eckart		baritone	
A page		mezzo-soprano	
Chorus: fishermen, male and female Saracens, banished people

== Synopsis ==
The opera deals with Manfred, 13th-century King of Sicily (1232-1266), against whom was half Europe: eventually he fell in battle against Charles I of Anjou. The action takes place in 1266 in Naples and Benevento.

== List of musical numbers ==
The following list is based on the Breitkopf & Härtel 1868 vocal score.

- Overture

Act I

- No. 1. Chor
- No. 2.
- No. 3. Arie mit Chor
- No. 4. Sextett mit Chor
- No. 5. Recitativ und Arie
- No. 6. Recitativ
- No. 7. Lied mit Chor
- No. 8. Recitativ und Terzett
- No. 9. Finale

Act II

- No. 10.
- No. 11. Duett
- No. 12. Solo mit Chor
- No. 13.
- No. 14. Duett
- No. 15. Lied
- No. 16. Scene und Duett

Act III

- No. 17. Chor
- No. 18. Recitativ und Terzett
- No. 19. Chor und Ballett
- No. 20. Finale

Act IV

- No. 21. Entr'act
- No. 22. Duett mit Ballett
- No. 23. Recitativ und Duett
- No. 24. Duett
- No. 25. Recitativ und Arie
- No. 26. Recitativ
- No. 27. Arie
- No. 28. Finale

Act V

- No. 29. Vorspiel
- No. 30. Recitativ
- No. 31. Romanze
- No. 32. Recitativ und Arie
- No. 33. Recitativ und Scene
- No. 34. Recitativ und Chor
- No. 35. Recitativ
- No. 36. Arioso und Schlusschor

== Recordings ==
- (rec. 1987) Carl Reinecke: Symphony No. 1; King Manfred (Overture; Nos. 21 & 29; part II of No. 19) — Rhenish Philharmonic Orchestra, Alfred Walter — Marco Polo 8.223117 (reissued Naxos 8.555397)
- (rec. 2013, 2014, 2016) Carl Reinecke: Orchestral Works, Vol. 1: Symphonies 1 & 3; König Manfred (Overture; Nos. 21 & 29) — Münchner Rundfunkorchester, Henry Raudales — cpo 555 114-2
