= Humbert I of Viennois =

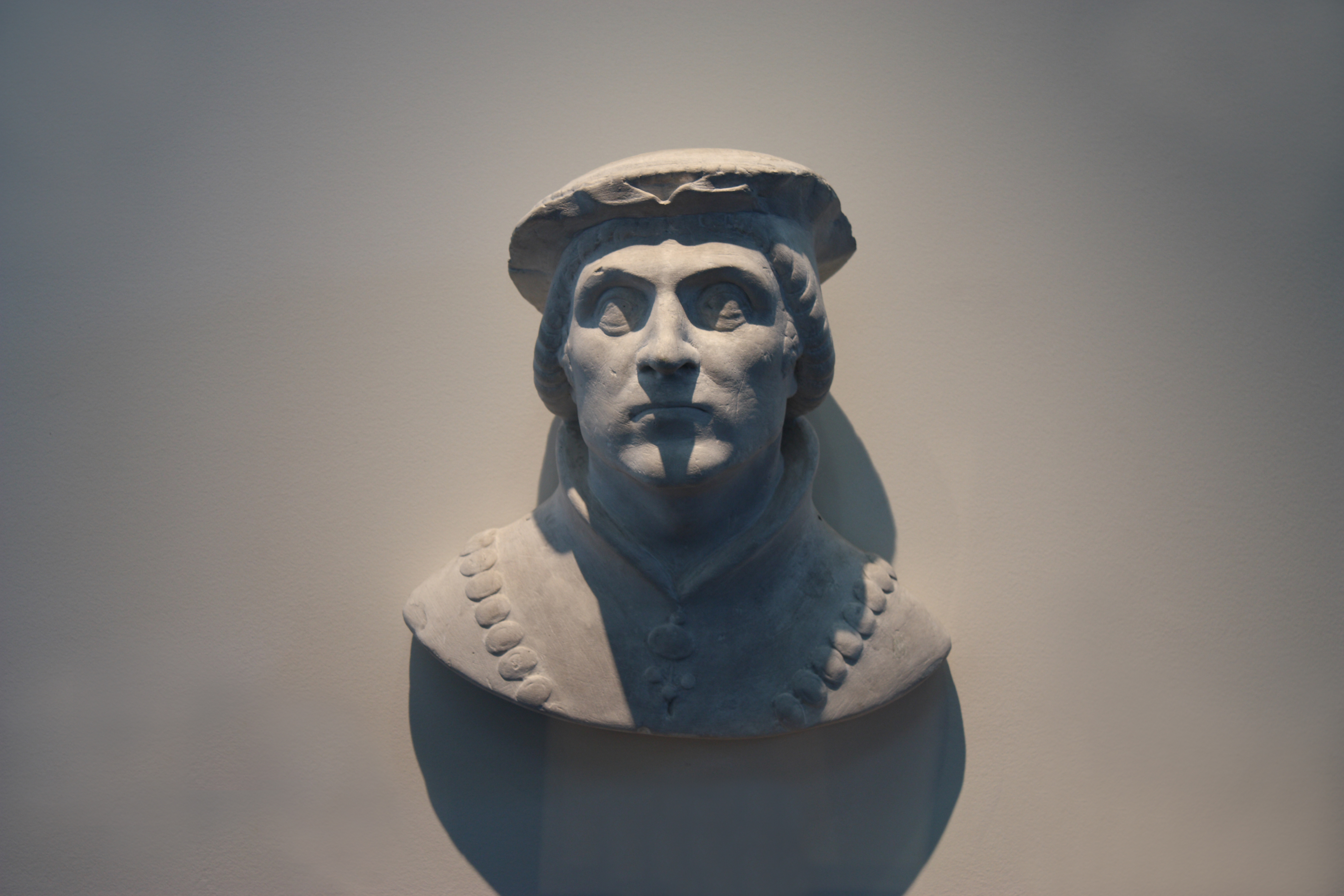
Bust of Humbert I

Humbert I of Viennois (c. 1240 – 12 April 1307) was baron of la Tour-du-Pin and then also became, by his marriage, dauphin of Viennois. He was the son of Albert III, baron of la Tour-du-Pin, and of Béatrice de Coligny (herself the daughter of Hugh I, lord of Coligny and of Béatrice d'Albon, dauphine of Viennois).

In 1294, Humbert became a vassal of King Philip IV of France in exchange for £500 annual pension, which would give impetus to the acquisition of the Dauphiné, by King Philip VI of France, fifty years later.

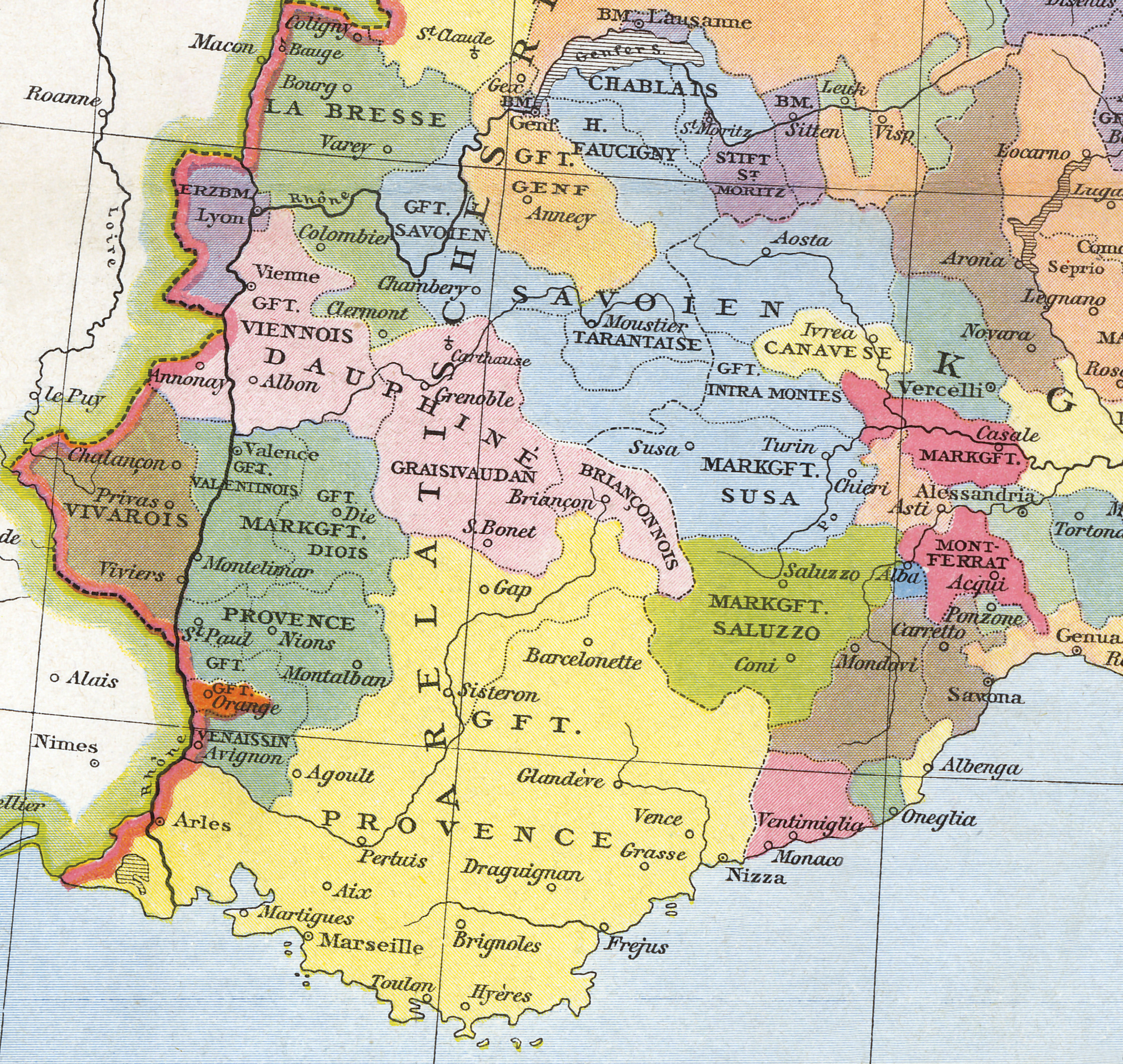
Dauphiné of Viennois (pink), within the Kingdom of Burgundy (Arles), under the suzerainty of the Holy Roman Empire

In September 1273 Humbert married Anne of Burgundy (daughter of Guigues VII of Viennois) – their nine children were:

- John II (1280 † 1319), succeeded his father as dauphin of Viennois
- Hugues († 1329), baron de Faucigny, married Maria, daughter of Count Amadeus V of Savoy and Marie of Brabant
- Guigues († 1319), seigneur de Montauban.
- Alix (1280 † 1309), married John I (1275 † 1333), count of Forez in 1296
- Marie, married Aymar de Poitiers-Valentinois
- Marguerite, married Frederick I († 1336), Marquess of Saluzzo in 1303
- Béatrice (1275 † 1347), married Hugh I of Chalon-Arlay in 1312
- Henri (1296 † 1349), bishop of Metz
- Catherine († 1337), married Philip of Savoy (1278 † 1334), count of Piedmont and prince of Achaea in 1312

== Sources ==
- Cox, Eugene L. (1967). The Green Count of Savoy. Princeton, New Jersey: Princeton University Press. LCCN 67-11030.
- Cox, Eugene L. (1974). The Eagles of Savoy: The House of Savoy in Thirteenth-Century Europe. Princeton University Press.
- Cox, Eugene (1999). "The Kingdom of Burgundy, the lands of the house of Savoy and adjacent territories". In Abulafia, David; McKitterick, Rosamond (eds.). The New Cambridge Medieval History. Vol. 5, C.1198 – c.1300. Cambridge University Press.
