= Amadeus IV of Savoy =

Italian noble (1197–1253)

Amadeus IV
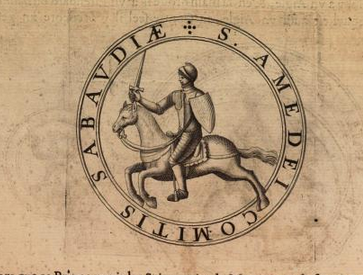

Count of Savoy
- Reign: 1233–1253
- Predecessor: Thomas I
- Successor: Boniface
- Born: 1197; Montmélian, Savoie
- Died: 11 June 1253
- Spouse: Marguerite of Burgundy; Cecilia of Baux
- Issue: Beatrice of Savoy; Margaret of Savoy; Boniface, Count of Savoy; Beatrice of Savoy
- House: Savoy
- Father: Thomas I of Savoy
- Mother: Margaret of Geneva

Amadeus IV (1197 – 11 June 1253) was Count of Savoy from 1233 to 1253.

Amadeus was born in Montmélian, Savoy. The legitimate heir of Thomas I of Savoy and Margaret of Geneva, he had, however, to fight with his brothers for the inheritance of Savoy's lands after their father's death. His brothers Pietro and Aimone spurred a revolt in Aosta Valley against Amadeus, but he was able to crush it with the help of Manfred III of Saluzzo and Boniface II of Montferrat, who were his sons-in-law. Together with his brother, Thomas, he fought against the communes of Turin and Pinerolo, but with uncertain results.

He was succeeded by his young son Boniface.

== Career ==
=== Head of the family ===
As the eldest son of Thomas I of Savoy, Amadeus inherited the county and associated lands on his father's death in 1233. However, his brothers Peter and Aymon demanded that he divide the territories and give them their share. In July 1234, he and his brother William convened a family meeting at Château de Chillon. While both sides arrived with armed troops, William was able to negotiate a treaty between the brothers. This treaty kept the lands intact, but recognised the authority of the younger brothers within certain regions under Amadeus. These territories were on the frontiers of Savoy lands, designed to encourage the brothers to expand the county rather than diminish it. When his brother Thomas left his career in the church in 1235, Amadeus granted him similar territories.

Before he had a son, Amadeus changed his mind many times regarding his will. Initially, he had made his sons-in-law his heirs, but in 1235, he rewrote his will in favour of his brother Thomas. In December of that year, it went back to having his sons-in-law as heirs, until Amadeus was preparing for the siege. Then he rewrote the will in favour of Thomas. In March 1239, his daughters convinced him to return it to their favour. On 4 November 1240, Thomas returned and persuaded him to rewrite the will in his brother's favour again. When Thomas left, once again the will was reversed. His final will was written in 1252, leaving the title and nearly everything to his son, Boniface, and naming his brother Thomas as regent and second in line for the title.

=== Among European powers ===
Amadeus faced many challenges in balancing the demands of the greater powers in Europe at that time. Henry III of England wrote to Amadeus in 1235 to seek his consent and blessing to marry the Count's niece, Eleanor of Provence In 1238, Amadeus went to the court of Frederick II, Holy Roman Emperor, in Turin, where he was knighted by the Emperor. Then with his brothers, he led troops as part of the siege of Brescia. In July 1243, Amadeus and his brother Thomas were ordered by Enzo of Sardinia to join him in a siege of Vercelli, which had recently switched allegiances from the Empire to the Pope. Not only was the attack on the city unsuccessful, but Amadeus and his brother were excommunicated for it. When the brothers wrote to the new Pope Innocent IV to appeal the excommunication, he granted their request.

In late 1244, when Pope Innocent IV fled from Rome, Amadeus met him in Susa and escorted him through the passes to Chambéry, and then provided his brother Philip as escort for the Pope downriver to Lyon. However, Amadeus was then willing to open the same passes to the imperial army. He also signed a treaty with Henry III on 16 January 1246, which gave rights of passage through the passes to the English in exchange for an annual payment of 200 marks. That same month, Amadeus joined a force which went to Provence to rescue his niece, Beatrice of Provence from the forces of Frederick and escort her to her marriage to Charles of Anjou By May 1247, Frederick was ready to move against the Pope. He had gathered his army in Turin and ordered those still loyal to him in the kingdoms of Arles and France to meet at Chambéry (the capital of Savoy). However, the revolt of Parma pulled Frederick back from this plan. That same summer, Amadeus blocked an attempt by the Pope to send 1500 soldiers to the Lombard League. On 8 November 1248, Frederick asked Amadeus and his brother Thomas to go to Lyon and start negotiations for peace. However, their efforts were unsuccessful and the war continued until the death of Frederick.

== Family and children ==
He married twice, and each marriage produced children

Around 1217, he married Margaret of Burgundy. They had:

- Beatrice (d. 1258), married firstly in 1233 Manfred III of Saluzzo (d. 1244), married secondly on 21 April 1247 Manfred of Sicily
- Margaret, married firstly on 9 December 1235 Marquis Boniface II of Montferrat, married secondly Count Aymar III of Valentinois

On 18 December 1244, he married Cecilia of Baux. They had:

- Boniface, Count of Savoy
- Beatrice (1250 – 23 February 1292) married Peter of Chalon and Infante Manuel of Castile.
- Eleonor, married in 1269 Guichard de Beaujeu
- Constance, died after 1263

== Sources ==
- Chaubet, Daniel (1984). "Une enquête historique en Savoie au XVe siècle". Journal des savants (in French). 1: 93-125. doi:10.3406/jds.1984.1477.
- Cognasso, Francesco (1940). Tommaso I ed Amedeo IV (in Italian). Turin.
- Cox, Eugene L. (1974). The Eagles of Savoy. Princeton: Princeton University Press. ISBN 0691052166.
- Gee, Loveday Lewes (2002). Women, Art, and Patronage from Henry III to Edward III, 1216-1377. The Boydell Press.
- Mugnier, F. (1890). Les Savoyards en Angleterre au XIII siècle. Chambéry.

Amadeus IV House of Savoy Born: 1197 Died: 11 June 1253
Regnal titles
Preceded by Thomas I	Count of Savoy; 1233–1253	Succeeded by Boniface
