= Humbert I of Salins =

- Born: 905
- Died: 957/958
- Title: Lord of Salins
- Term: 943–957
- Parents: Aubry I of Mâcon (father); Tolana (mother)

Humbert of Salins (905 – 957/58), also named Humbert of Mâcon, was Lord of Salins (present eastern France) from 943 to 957.

He was the second son of Aubry I of Mâcon and Tolana of the House of Salins. He married Wandelmodis, daughter of Gui d'Escuens, with whom he had:

- Humbert II
- Adela, mother of Wandalmodis, who was married in 985 to Engelbert III de Brienne
- Vandelmode (died 957) married Beraud de Beaujeu (died before 967).
