= Boniface II of Montferrat =

King of Thessalonica (1202–1253)

Boniface II the Giant

Marquis of Montferrat
- Reign: 1225–1253
- Predecessor: William VI, Marquis of Montferrat
- Successor: William VII, Marquis of Montferrat
- Born: July 1202
- Died: 12 May 1253 (aged 50); Moncalvo
- Noble family: Aleramici
- Spouse: Margaret of Savoy
- Issue: William VII, Marquis of Montferrat; Alessia
- Father: William VI, Marquis of Montferrat
- Mother: Berta di Clavesana

Boniface II (July 1202 – 12 May 1253), called the Giant, was the marquis of Montferrat from 1225 until his death. He became the titular king of Thessalonica in 1239.

Boniface was the son of William VI and his second wife, Berta di Clavesana. He was appointed to succeed his father in 1225 when William led a group of crusaders to Frankish Greece. In spring 1226, he took full command of Montferrat.

Boniface contracted an alliance with his cousin Manfred III of Saluzzo by which if one died without heirs the other would inherit his domains. This served to avert a civil war in which the intervention of the Emperor Frederick II, who was not on good terms with Boniface, could have been expected. Boniface had failed to repay the heavy debts to the German crown which his father had incurred. In 1226, threatened by imperial disfavour, he allied with the Lombard League against the Emperor. Despite the eventual mediation of Pope Honorius III, the two men were ever distrustful of one another.

Towards 1228, Boniface negotiated a marital alliance with the House of Savoy. He proposed to marry Margaret, daughter of Amadeus IV of Savoy, but her grandfather Thomas I refused to grant the marriage while she was still very young. The two were wed in December 1235 at Chivasso, his capital, and Margaret became the mother of the future William VII and of Alessia (also called Alessina, Adelaide, Adelheid).

Amadeus appears to have concluded an agreement with Boniface whereby the latter would succeed to his Alpine Piedmontese lands if the Savoyard died without heirs. However, the alliance with Savoy broke down and the agreement was never realised.

Boniface's main sights, however, were not on the Piedmont but on nearby Alessandria: from 1227, when he strengthened an alliance with Asti, he continued until his death to fight the Alessandrini. On the side of Alessandria rallied the League and Milan. In 1230, after having lost many fortified places, Boniface was roundly defeated and forced to recognise the power and rights of the League. When he tried again to bring Alessandria into submission, with allies from Saluzzo and Savoy, the Milanese army attacked Chivasso. The protracted siege lasted four months, with Boniface's attempts to repulse the besiegers failing each time. Chivasso capitulated 5 September 1231 and was not returned to Boniface for another year, after the Marquis had admitted his own defeat and come to terms.

After a subsequent rupture in his relations with Saluzzo and Savoy, he was prevented for a while from seeing his wife, who had gone on a trip to Piedmont. It was then that Boniface decided to switch loyalties and turned to the imperial camp. He escorted the Emperor on his Italian journeys and, in 1239, Frederick invested him with Thessalonica, which had originally been conquered by his grandfather in the aftermath of the Fourth Crusade. Boniface I had left it to his second son Demetrius, who ceded his rights to the Emperor in 1230. This situation of amicability with the Empire did not persist, however. In 1243, he was bought over to the Guelph party. In 1245, when Frederick visited Turin, Boniface met him and requested his pardon. He was received back into the imperial fold. At this time of constant warfare with his relatives, news arrived of the death of Manfred of Saluzzo. Following the dead Marquis's will, Boniface was afforded custody and guardianship of the young heir Thomas and his sister Alasia.

The continuing political manoeuvring of Boniface was a response to the growing power of Amadeus of Savoy and, above all, the imperial decision to create a satellite state in Piedmont, carved from territory of Savoy, Saluzzo, and, above all, Montferrat. The death of Frederick in 1250 brought a brief respite and calm to Boniface's politics. Thenceforward distracted by the fight for the southern Piedmont, Boniface dedicated more energy to internal affairs than to warmaking. At Rome, Frederick's successor, Conrad IV, invested him with some adjacent land, particularly the city of Casale Monferrato. On 4 May 1253, Conrad invested him with Casale and on 12 May he was dead at Moncalvo, only a few hours after dictating his testament. His son William VII succeeded him, his daughter Alessina married Albert I of Brunswick.

== Sources ==
- Barachini, Giorgio, ed. (2015). Il trovatore Elias de Barjols (in Italian). Edizioni Nuova cultura.
- Gee, Loveday Lewes (2002). Women, Art, and Patronage from Henry III to Edward III, 1216-1377. The Boydell Press.
- Caravale, Mario (ed). Dizionario Biografico degli Italiani: XII. Rome, 1970.
- Bonifacio II.

Regnal titles
Preceded by William VI	Marquis of Montferrat; 1225–1253	Succeeded by William VII
Titles in pretence
Preceded by Frederick	King of Thessalonica; 1239–1253	Succeeded by William (VII)
