= Château d'Albon =

Castle in France

Coordinates: 45°14′54″N 4°52′13.5″E

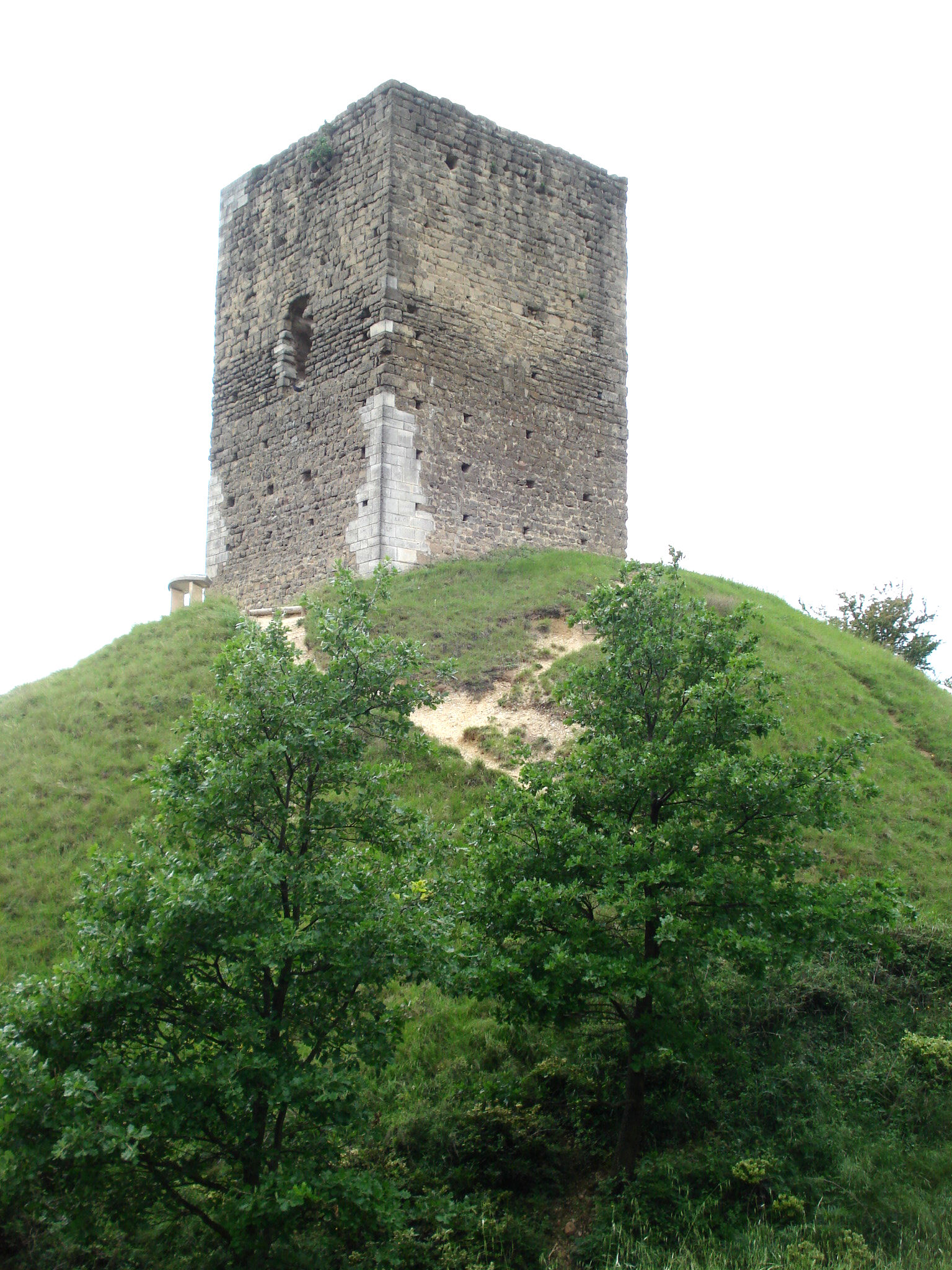
The Château d'Albon in 2008

The Château d'Albon is a ruined castle in the commune of Albon in the Drôme département of France. The castle appears as a square tower standing on a motte.

== History ==
The castle is located to the east of Saint-Romain-d'Albon in the commune of Albon. It was the main town of the Albon mandate in the Middle Ages, extending over the communes of Albon, Andancette, Anneyron and Saint-Rambert-d'Albon. The centre of power was moved from Saint-Romain-d'Albon.

The castle was the cradle of the Albon family's power. The Albons, mentioned in the Carolingian epoch, took the title of count in the 11th century and made the first constitution of Dauphiné as a territorial principality.

Around the 9th century, a small chapel existed on the site, as well as large silos for the storage of cereals. At the end of the 11th century, the chapel was replaced by a Gothic chapel, larger and decorated with moulding, painted coverings and stained-glass. The power of the Counts of Albon was very important at this time. They built a "palace", consisting of a large reception hall with large windows (aula) and private quarters (camera). In the 13th century, they built the motte and a keep, divided into three levels. The tower was originally built in wood, then in molasse and pebbles like the place. The castle chapel was rebuilt and a new building appeared, possibly a barn that was abandoned after a fire in the 14th century. Finally, the castle was abandoned from the 16th century. In the following centuries, it was used as a quarry with the exception of the tower.

== Architecture ==
The still visible square keep was previously accompanied by a lower court and a castle settlement, protected by a surrounding wall directly linked to the castle.

== Archaeology of the site ==
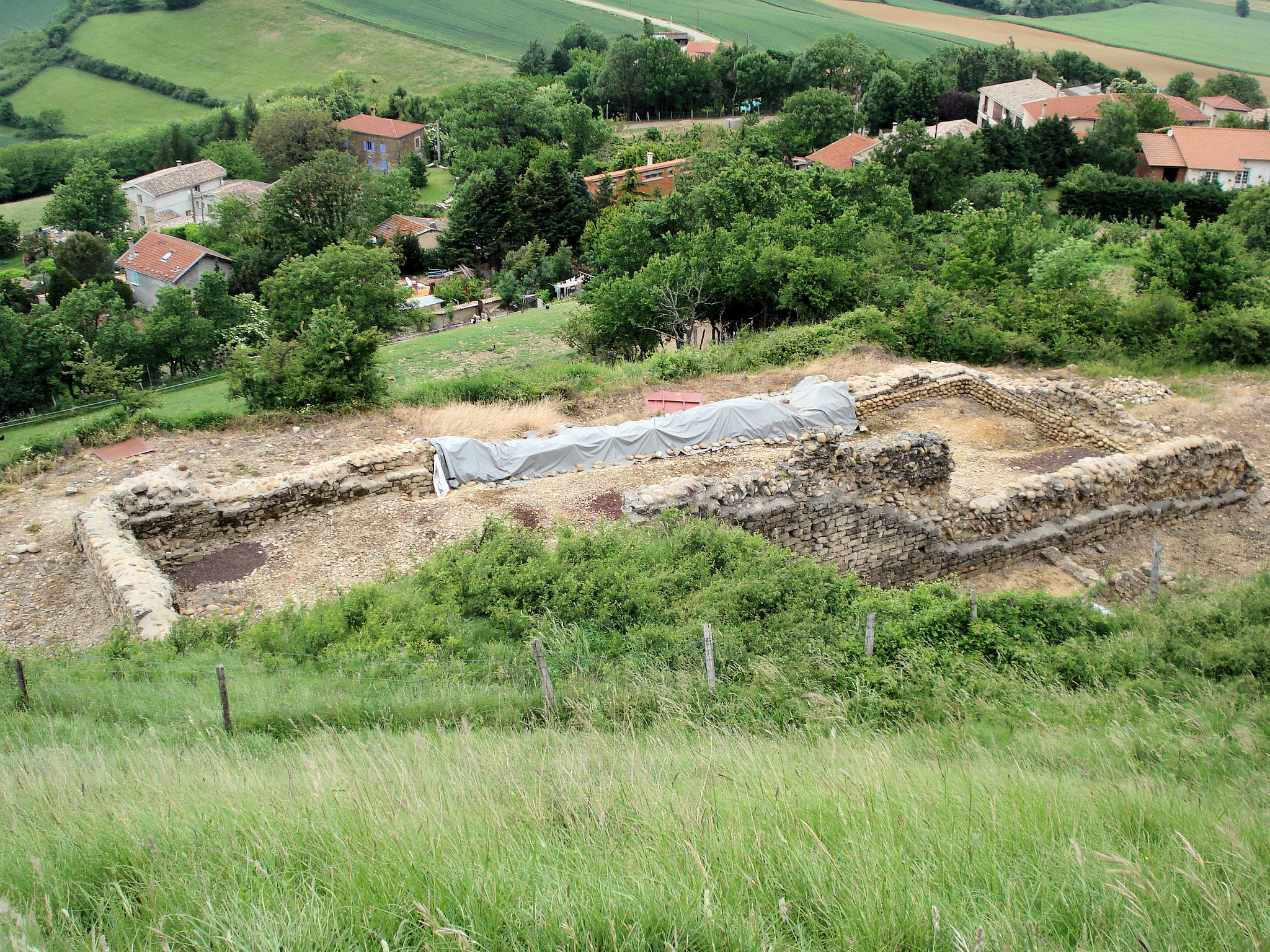
Ruins uncovered by archaeological digs

- In 1995, a monumental building, for residential use, was discovered in the lower court of the motte, dating from the 11th century
- In 1996–1997 a religious building was discovered, enlarged in the 13th century.

The castle ruins, property of the commune, were added to the list of monuments historiques by the French Ministry of Culture on 8 March 1982.

== See also ==
- List of castles in France
