= Cecile of Baux =

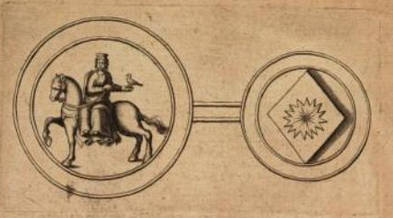
- Born: 1230
- Died: 1275 (aged 44–45)
- Noble family: Baux
- Spouse: Amadeus IV, Count of Savoy
- Father: Barral of Baux
- Mother: Sibylle d'Anduze

Cecile of Baux (1230–1275) was a Countess Consort of Savoy, married in 1244 to Amadeus IV, Count of Savoy. She was the daughter of Barral of Baux and his wife, Sibylle d'Anduze. She was the Regent of Savoy during the minority of her son, Boniface, Count of Savoy, from 1253 until 1259.

== Family and Issue ==
On 18 December 1244 she married Amadeus as his second wife. They had 4 children:

- Boniface, Count of Savoy
- Beatrice of Savoy (1250 – 23 February 1292) married Peter of Chalon and Manuel of Castile, Lord of Villena.
- Eleonor of Savoy, married in 1269 Guichard de Beaujeu
- Constance of Savoy, died after 1263

== Regency ==
A year before her husband died, he wrote a will which specified that his brother, Thomas and Cecile would act as regents for Boniface, the heir to the County of Savoy. When Thomas died in 1259, Cecile continued as regent in Savoy. In this role, one of her first acts was to relieve St-Germain-sur-Séez of various taxes in exchange for their work to guide travelers through the pass of Petit-St-Bernard. As regent, she had her own seal for authorizing documents. Under her regency, Boniface's uncles, Peter II and Philip I continued their practice of acquiring territories and influence in surrounding regions in the name of the count.

Preceded by Marguerite of Burgundy	Countess of Savoy; 1244–1253	Succeeded by Agnes of Faucigny
