= Albon, Drôme =

Albon
- Commune
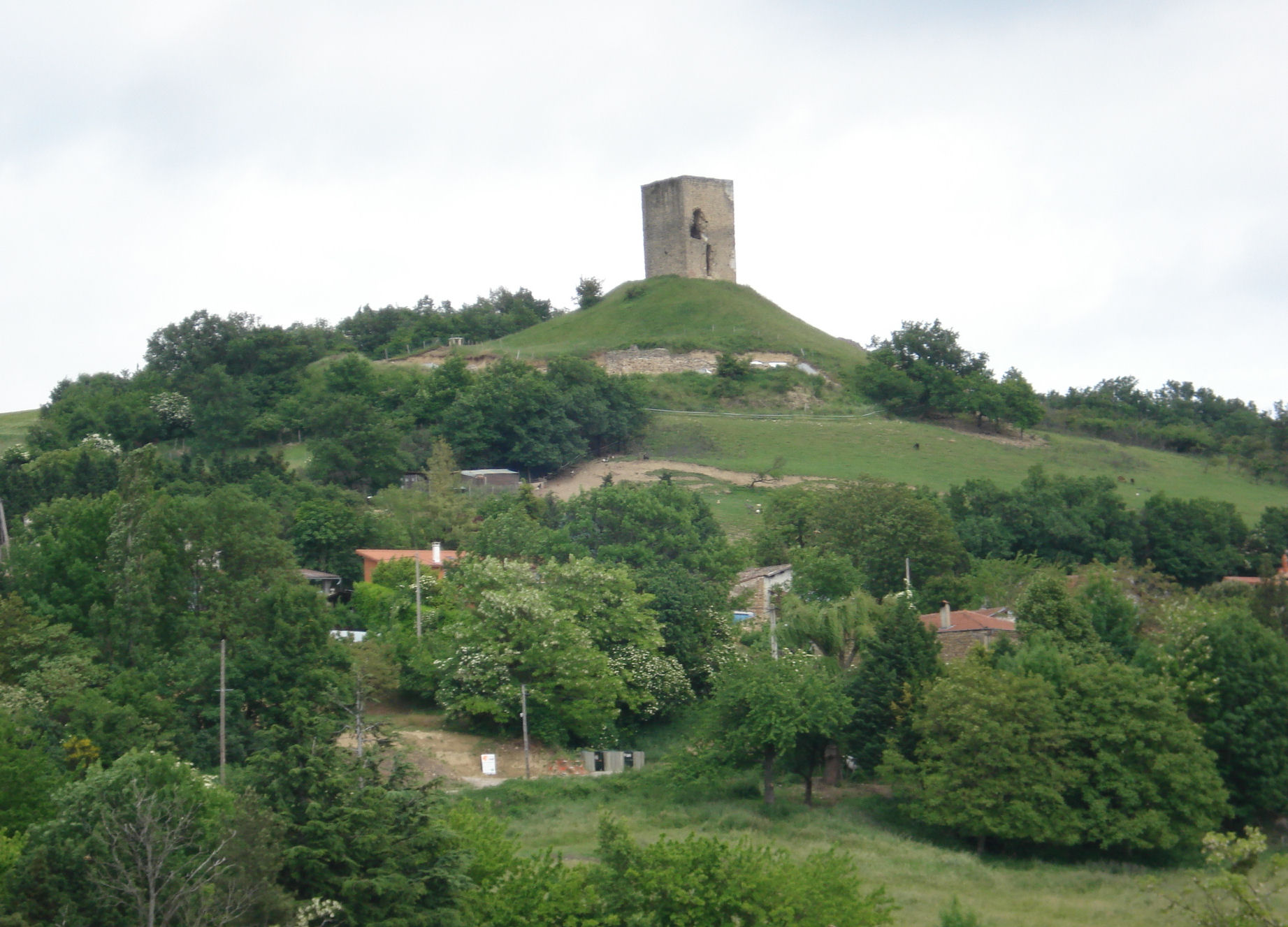
- Château d'Albon

- Coat of arms
- Location of Albon
- Location within France Location within Auvergne-Rhône-Alpes
- Coordinates: 45°14′47″N 4°50′58″E
- Country: France
- Region: Auvergne-Rhône-Alpes
- Department: Drôme
- Arrondissement: Valence
- Canton: Saint-Vallier
- Intercommunality: Porte de DrômArdèche

Government
  - Mayor (2020–2026): Philippe Becheras
- Area^{1}: 25.62 km^{2} (9.89 sq mi)
- Elevation: 240 m (790 ft)
- Highest elevation: 365 m (1,198 ft)
- Lowest elevation: 134 m (440 ft)
- Population (2023): 1,942
  - Density: 75.80/km^{2} (196.3/sq mi)
- Time zone: UTC+01:00 (CET)
  - Summer (DST): UTC+02:00 (CEST)
- INSEE/Postal code: 26002 /26140
- ^{1} French Land Register data, which excludes lakes, ponds, glaciers > 1 km^{2} (0.386 sq mi or 247 acres) and river estuaries.

Albon (French pronunciation: [albɔ̃]; Arpitan: Arbon) is a commune in the Drôme department in southeastern France.

== Population ==
Historical population
Year	Pop.	±% p.a.
1968	1,206	—
1975	1,136	−0.85%
1982	1,313	+2.09%
1990	1,543	+2.04%
1999	1,573	+0.21%
2007	1,694	+0.93%
2012	1,732	+0.44%
2017	1,937	+2.26%
2023	1,942	+0.04%
Source: INSEE

== Sights ==
- Château d'Albon - remains of medieval castle.

== See also ==
- Communes of the Drôme department
