= Manfred, King of Sicily =

King of Sicily from 1258 to 1266

Manfred
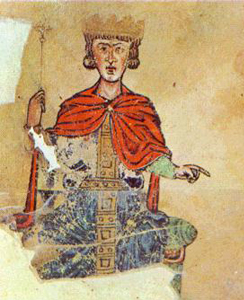
- Contemporary depiction of Manfred from the De arte venandi cum avibus - Vatican Library ms. pal. lat. 1071, fol. 1v (13th-century)

King of Sicily
- Reign: 1258 – 26 February 1266
- Coronation: 10 August 1258
- Predecessor: Conradin
- Successor: Charles I
- Born: Manfred Lancia; 1232; Venosa, Kingdom of Sicily
- Died: 26 February 1266 (aged 33—34); Benevento, Kingdom of Sicily
- Spouses: Beatrice of Savoy (m. 1247; died 1259) Helena Angelina Doukaina (m. 1259)
- Issue more...: Constance II, Queen of Sicily; Beatrix, Marchioness of Saluzzo
- House: Hohenstaufen
- Father: Frederick II, Holy Roman Emperor
- Mother: Bianca Lancia

Manfred (Sicilian: Manfredi di Sicilia; 1232 – 26 February 1266) was the last King of Sicily from the Hohenstaufen dynasty, reigning from 1258 until his death. The natural son of the Holy Roman Emperor Frederick II, Manfred became regent over the Kingdom of Sicily on behalf of his nephew Conradin in 1254. As regent, he subdued rebellions in the kingdom until, in 1258, he usurped Conradin's rule. After an initial attempt to appease Pope Innocent IV, he took up the ongoing conflict between the Hohenstaufens and the papacy through combat and political alliances. He defeated the papal army at Foggia on 2 December 1254. Excommunicated by three successive popes, Manfred was the target of a Crusade (1255–1266) called first by Pope Alexander IV and then by Urban IV. Nothing came of Alexander's call, but Urban enlisted the aid of Charles of Anjou in overthrowing Manfred. Manfred was killed during his defeat by Charles at the Battle of Benevento, and Charles assumed kingship of Sicily.

== Early life ==
Manfred was born in Venosa. Frederick II appears to have regarded him as legitimate, and by his will named him as Prince of Taranto. Frederick named Manfred's half-brother Conrad IV king of Germany, Italy and Sicily, but Manfred was regent of Sicily while Conrad was in Germany. Manfred, who initially bore his mother's surname, studied in Paris and Bologna and shared with his father a love of poetry and science.

At Frederick's death in 1250, Manfred, although only about 18 years old, acted loyally and with vigour in the execution of his trust. The Kingdom was in turmoil, mainly due to rebellions spurred by Pope Innocent IV. Manfred was able to subdue numerous rebel cities, with the exception of Naples. Manfred attempted in 1251 to make concessions to Pope Innocent to stave off the prospect of war, but the attempt failed. When Conrad IV, Manfred's legitimate brother, appeared in southern Italy in 1252, his authority was quickly and generally acknowledged. Conrad quickly stripped Manfred of all his fiefs by limiting his authority solely to the principality of Taranto. In October 1253, Naples fell into the hands of Conrad. Conrad made the pope the guardian of Conradin, his infant son, and named the Margrave Berthold of Hohenberg, a powerful German baron, as Conradin's regent. (Note: Lomax (2013, p. 440) gives Berthold's title as bailiff. Venning & Frankopan (2015, p. 335) asserts that Berthold was Conradin's regent over Apulia but Pietro Ruffo the regent over Sicily.)

In May 1254 Conrad died of malaria at the age of twenty-six. Manfred, after refusing to surrender Sicily to Innocent IV, accepted the regency on behalf of Conradin. The pope, however, having been named guardian of Conradin, excommunicated Manfred in July 1254. The regent decided to open negotiations with Innocent. As part of a treaty made in September 1254, Manfred submitted, and accepted the title of Papal vicar for southern Italy But Manfred—his suspicions aroused by the demeanour of the papal retinue and annoyed by the occupation of Campania by papal troops—fled to the Saracens at Lucera. Aided by Saracen allies, he defeated the papal army at Foggia on 2 December 1254, and soon established his authority over Sicily and the Sicilian possessions on the mainland. In that year, Manfred supported the Ghibelline communes in Tuscany, in particular Siena, to which he provided a corps of German knights that was later instrumental in the defeat of Florence at the Battle of Montaperti. He thus reached the status of patron of the Ghibelline League. Also in that year, Innocent died, succeeded by Alexander IV, who immediately excommunicated Manfred. In 1257, however, Manfred crushed the papal army and settled all the rebellions, imposing his firm rule of southern Italy and receiving the title of vicar from Conradin.

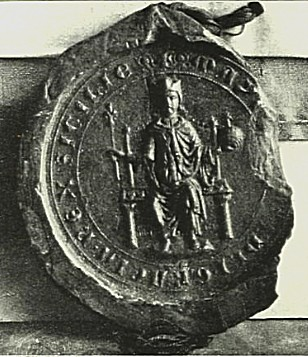
Seal of Manfred

Coat of arms of King Manfred

== Kingship ==
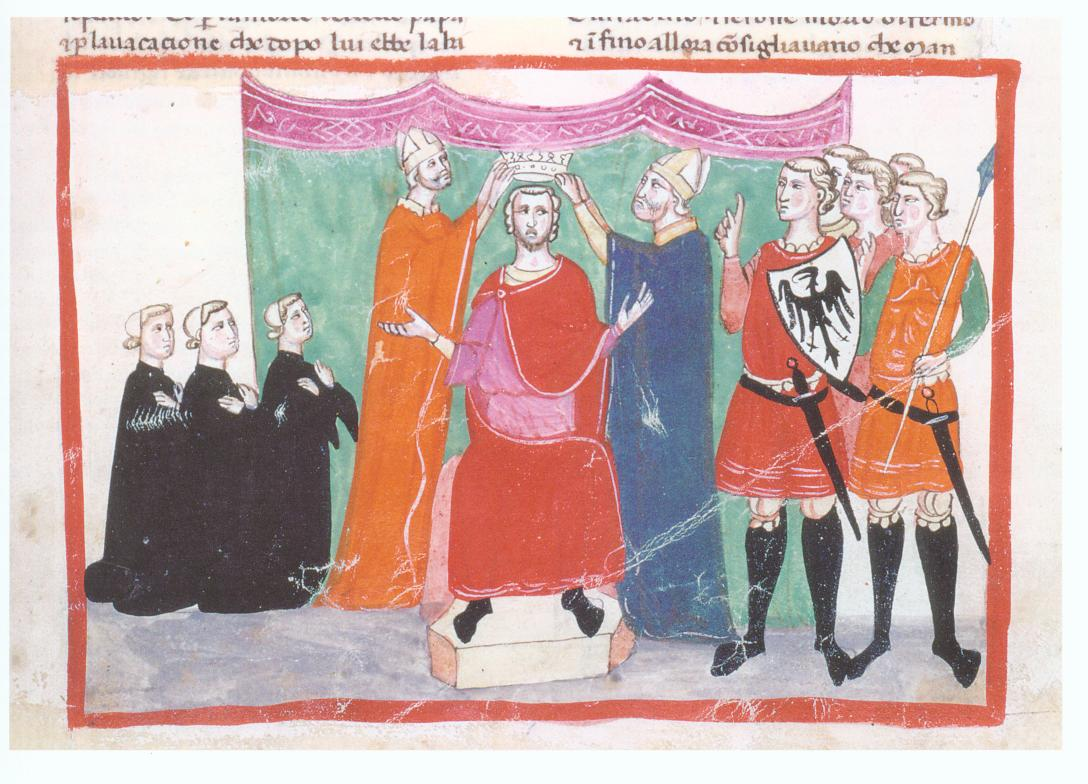
Coronation of Manfred at Palermo in 1258, Nuova Cronica

On 10 August 1258, taking advantage of Conradin's rumoured death, Manfred was crowned King of Sicily at Palermo. The falsehood of this report was soon manifest; but the new king, supported by the popular voice, declined to abdicate and pointed out to Conradin's envoys the necessity for a strong native ruler. The pope, to whom the Saracen alliance was a serious offence, declared Manfred's coronation void. Undeterred by the excommunication, Manfred sought to obtain power in central and northern Italy, where the Ghibelline leader Ezzelino III da Romano had disappeared. He named vicars in Tuscany, Spoleto, Marche, Romagna and Lombardy. This period was perhaps the high point of Ghibelline power in Italy in the 13th century after the death of Frederick II. After Montaperti, Manfred was recognized as protector of Tuscany by the citizens of Florence, who did homage to his representative, and he was chosen "Senator of the Romans" by a faction in the city. His power was also augmented by the marriage of his daughter Constance in 1262 to Peter III of Aragon. Having expanded his hegemony into Italy and even into western and southern Greece, Manfred looked poised to reach for his illustrious father's immense power and status. The sophisticated state machinery left by Frederick II in the kingdom of Sicily was well-oiled and still functioned effectively, and even in the rest of Italy, the formative structure for a unified Italo-Sicilian regime fashioned by Frederick in his last decade appeared primed to proceed again at pace under Manfred. It seemed like Manfred could, like his father, use the kingdom of Sicily as an almost impregnable base from which to cement Staufen power throughout all of Italy once more and grasp for the imperial crown. A revived Staufen Mediterranean empire looked in prospect.

Terrified by this, the new Pope Urban IV excommunicated him. The pope first tried to sell the Kingdom of Sicily to Richard of Cornwall and his son, but in vain. In 1263 he was most successful with Charles I of Anjou, a brother of King Louis IX of France, who accepted the investiture of the kingdom of Sicily at his hands. Hearing of the approach of Charles, Manfred issued a manifesto to the Romans, in which he not only defended his rule over Italy but even claimed the imperial crown.

Charles' army, some 30,000 strong, entered Italy from the Col de Tende in late 1265. He soon reduced numerous Ghibelline strongholds in northern Italy and was crowned in Rome in January 1266, the pope being absent. On 20 January, he set southwards and waded the Liri river, invading the Kingdom of Sicily. After some minor clashes, the rival armies met at the Battle of Benevento on 26 February 1266, and Manfred's army was defeated. The king himself, refusing to flee, rushed into the midst of his enemies and was killed. Over his body, which was buried on the battlefield, a huge heap of stones was placed, but afterwards with the consent of the pope the remains were unearthed, cast out of the papal territory, and interred on the bank of the Garigliano River, outside of the boundaries of Naples and the Papal States.

At the Battle of Benevento, Charles captured Helena, Manfred's second wife, and imprisoned her. She lived five years in captivity in the castle of Nocera Inferiore, where she died in 1271. Manfred's son-in-law, Peter III, eventually became King Peter I of Sicily from 1282 after the Sicilian Vespers expelled the French from the island again.

The modern city of Manfredonia was built by King Manfred between 1256 and 1263, some kilometres north of the ruins of the ancient Sipontum. The Angevines, who had defeated Manfred and stripped him of the Kingdom of Sicily, renamed it Sypontum Novellum ("New Sypontum"), but that name never imposed.

Manfred maintained diplomatic relations with the Mamluk sultans of Egypt through the exchange of gifts. Sultan Baybars, for example, sent him a giraffe, acquired through a tribute from Nubia, and considered one of the rarest, most dazzling gifts one could send.

== Marriages and children ==
Manfred was married twice:

- His first wife was Beatrice, daughter of Amadeus IV, count of Savoy, by whom he had a daughter, Constance, who was married to the heir to the Aragonese throne, the future King Peter III of Aragon, on 13 June 1262.
- Manfred's second wife was Helena Angelina Doukaina, daughter of Michael II Komnenos Doukas, ruler of the despotate of Epirus, who made this marriage to ally with Manfred after being attacked by him at Thessalonica. Helena and Manfred had four children: Beatrix, Henry [Enrico], Anselm [Azzolino] and Frederick. Helena and all her children were captured by Charles of Anjou after Manfred's death in 1266. Helena died in prison in Nocera in 1271. Her three sons with Manfred – the oldest only four years old at the time – were imprisoned in the Castel del Monte until 1299, when Charles II had them unchained and moved to the Castel dell'Ovo. Their living conditions were exceptionally miserable compared to the norm for noble prisoners. Kept in darkness, in heavy chains and with barely enough food to survive, they became "blind and half-mad". The stress of the move proved too much for Azzolino, who died soon after (in 1301). Henry survived another eighteen years, dying aged fifty-four on 31 October 1318, "half-starved, half-mad and probably blind". Beatrix, in contrast, had been released on the orders of the Aragonese commander Roger of Lauria following a battle off Naples in 1284. She went on to marry Manfred IV, Marquis of Saluzzo. The eldest son, Frederick, escaped from his prison and fled to Germany. He spent time in several European courts before dying in Egypt in 1312.

Manfred had at least one illegitimate child, a daughter named Flordelis (d. 27 February 1297), who married Ranieri Della Gherardesca, Count of Donoratico and Bolgheri.

== Legacy and reception ==
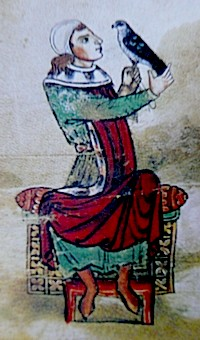
Manfred holding a falcon from the 13th-century De arte venandi cum avibus

=== Medieval reception ===
Contemporaries praised the noble and magnanimous character of Manfred, who was renowned for his physical beauty and intellectual attainments.

In the Divine Comedy, Dante Alighieri meets Manfred outside the gates of Purgatory, where the spirit explains that, although he repented of his sins in articulo mortis, he must atone for his contumacy by waiting 30 years for each year he lived as an excommunicate, before being admitted to Purgatory proper. He then asks Dante to tell Constance about him being in Purgatory. With this statement, Manfred reveals that one's time in Purgatory can lessen if someone still alive can pray on their behalf, anticipating one of the recurring themes in Purgatorio. Family connections, whether by blood or by marriage, are heavily referenced throughout this section of the Divine Comedy. Dante uses these relationships to demonstrate that earthly connections impede souls in Purgatory from reaching Paradise.

Dante's placing of Manfred in Purgatory is surprising, given Manfred's excommunication by multiple popes. Manfred's placement in Purgatory is indicative of Dante's dislike of popes' use of excommunication as a political and policy tool. According to Dante, Manfred's excommunication does not make it impossible for him to make it through Purgatory and, eventually, into Paradise. Dante adds to this characterization of Manfred and the Church by describing how the Church ordered Manfred's bones unearthed after his death and thrown into a river outside the kingdom in fear that his gravesite would inspire the development of a cult around it.

Manfred's presence in Purgatorio also holds a more general symbolic value. Robert Hollander argues that Manfred's time in Purgatory should be seen as a symbol of hope, given that Manfred's final statement in Purgatorio, Canto III is that "hope maintains a thread of green" (speranza ha fior del verde) (Purgatorio III.135), which is paraphrased as death not eliminating hope so long as even a bit of hope is there.

=== Modern reception ===
Manfred formed the subject of dramas by E.B.S. Raupach, O. Marbach and F.W. Roggee. Three letters written by Manfred were published by J. B. Carusius in Bibliotheca historica regni Siciliae (Palermo, 1732).

Manfred's name was borrowed by the English author Horace Walpole for the main character of his short novel The Castle of Otranto (1764). Montague Summers, in his 1924 edition of this work, showed that some details of Manfred of Sicily's real history inspired the novelist. The name was re-borrowed by Lord Byron for his dramatic poem Manfred (1817).

Inspired by Byron's poem, Manfred was adapted musically by Robert Schumann in 1852, in a composition entitled Manfred: Dramatic Poem with Music in Three Parts, and later by Pyotr Ilyich Tchaikovsky in his Manfred Symphony (1885).

King Manfred (König Manfred), Op. 93 is a grand romantic opera in 5 acts by Carl Reinecke to libretto by Friedrich Roeber. It was composed in 1866 and staged in 1867.

== Notes ==
Regnal titles
Preceded by Conradin	King of Sicily; 1258 – 26 February 1266	Succeeded by Charles I
