= Boniface, Count of Savoy =

Boniface

Count of Savoy
- Reign: 1253–1263
- Predecessor: Amadeus IV
- Successor: Peter II
- Born: 1 December 1244; Chambéry, France
- Died: 7 June 1263 (aged 18); Turin, Italy
- House: Savoy
- Father: Amadeus IV of Savoy
- Mother: Cecile of Baux

Boniface (1 December 1244–7 June 1263) was Count of Savoy from 1253 to 1263, succeeding his father Amadeus IV. He never married and thus left no heir.

== Career ==
Boniface was born in Chambéry on 1 December 1244.

Since he became Count of Savoy at the age of nine, he required a regency. Throughout the decade before his death, Savoy was governed through a joint regency resembling that devised for his grandfather Thomas in 1189, in which authority was shared between his mother, Cecile of Baux, and one of his uncles, Thomas II of Piedmont. Boniface's other uncles, Peter and Philip, disputed this, seeking to divide the county's many properties, but Thomas took it to arbitration per the family treaty of 1234 which had been negotiated by his brother William and won out. Peter and Philip were, however, granted compensation in return, receiving more properties within the county. When Thomas died in 1259, Cecile continued as regent in Savoy. Under her regency, Philip and Peter continued their previous work of expanding the control and influence over the County of Savoy.

Boniface's campaigns in Flanders and Piedmont were not successful. In September 1262, Rudolf of Geneva offered homage to cousin Boniface after yet another round of the war between Peter and their kin in Geneva. On 7 July 1263 in Turin, Boniface was mortally wounded in battle and died aged 18, to be succeeded by his uncle Peter.

== Sources ==
- Cognasso, Francesco (1971). I Savoia. Milan: Dall'Oglio.
- Cox, Eugene L. (1974). The Eagles of Savoy. Princeton: Princeton University Press. ISBN 0691052166.
- José, Marie (1956). La Maison de Savoie, Les Origines, Le Comte Vert, Le Comte Rouge. Paris: Albin Michel.

Boniface House of Savoy Born: 1245 Died: 1263
Regnal titles
Preceded by Amadeus IV	Count of Savoy; 1253–1263 with Thomas II	Succeeded by Peter II
