= Col de la Croix Fry =

Mountain pass in France

- Location within Alps
- Elevation: 1,467 metres (4,813 ft)
- Traversed by: D16

Third Approach
- Location: Haute-Savoie, France
- Range: Chaîne des Aravis, French Prealps
- Coordinates: 45°52′36″N 6°24′17″E

The Col de la Croix Fry (1,467 m (4,813 ft)) is a mountain pass located in the Chaîne des Aravis, between Manigod and La Clusaz in the Haute-Savoie department of France. The road over the col is used occasionally by the Tour de France cycle race with the tour crossing the pass on Stage 19 of the 2013 Tour. At the summit is the village of La Croix Fry.

== Details of the climb ==
From the west, the climb starts at Thônes, from where the summit is 12.8 km (8.0 mi). Over this distance, the road climbs 842 m (2,762 ft) at an average gradient of 6.6%. En route, the climb passes through the village of Manigod. This is the climb used on the 2013 Tour de France, although the race turns onto the climb shortly before reaching Thônes, thus shortening the climb to 11.3 km (7.0 mi) at 7%; the climb is ranked category 1.

The climb from the east starts at Saint-Jean-de-Sixt, passing through La Clusaz. The total distance is 10.3 km (6.4 mi), with a climb of 507 m (1,663 ft) at an average of 4.9%.

== Tour de France ==
The Col de la Croix Fry was first used in the Tour de France cycle race in 1994 when the leader over the summit was Piotr Ugrumov. Since then, the pass has been crossed five more times, including on Stage 10 of the 2018 Tour.

=== Appearances in Tour de France ===
Year	Stage	Category	Start	Finish	Leader at the summit
2023	15	1	Les Gets	Saint-Gervais-les-Bains	Giulio Ciccone (ITA)
2018	10	1	Annecy	Le Grand-Bornand	Rudy Molard (FRA)
2013	19	1	Le Bourg-d'Oisans	Le Grand-Bornand	Rui Costa (POR)
2004	17	1	Le Bourg-d'Oisans	Le Grand-Bornand	Floyd Landis (USA)
1997	15	1	Courchevel	Morzine	Laurent Jalabert (FRA)
1994	18	1	Moûtiers	Cluses	Piotr Ugrumov (LAT)
