= Lac des Confins =

Lake in France

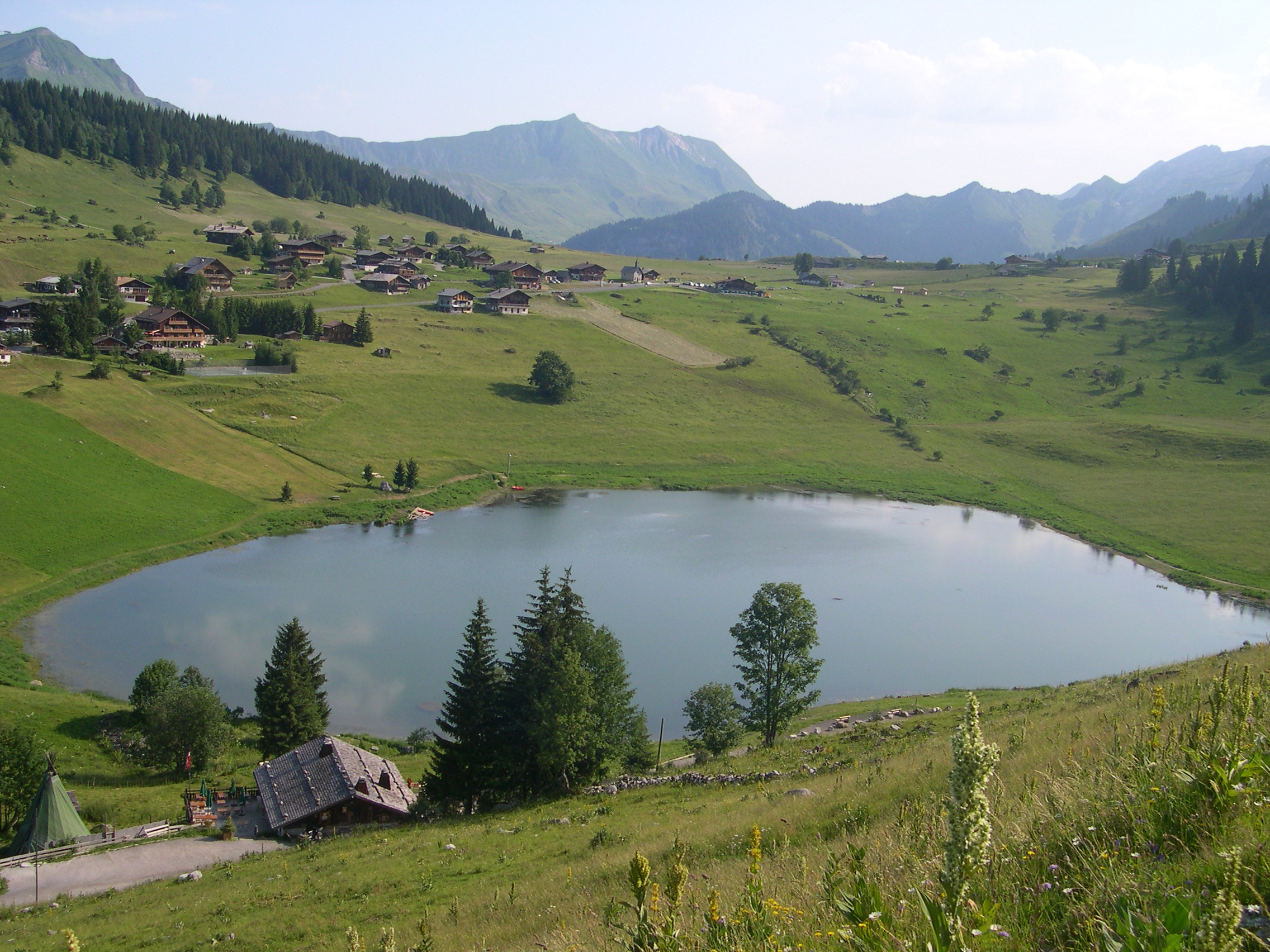

- Location within France
- Location: Haute-Savoie
- Coordinates: 45°54′57″N 6°28′34″E
- Basin countries: France

Lac des Confins is a lake located just below the station of La Clusaz in the Haute-Savoie department in the Rhône-Alpes region in south-eastern France. The lake is situated at the foot of the Aravis Range. Nearby is the Pointe Percée.

== Geography ==
The lake is located downstream from the Bella-Cha valley, near the place called Les Confins, at the foot of the Aravis mountain range, below on the adret of the Col des Confins which allows you to reach the Bouchet valley on foot. Located at an altitude of 1,358 metres, it freezes over in winter.

== Activities ==
Every year, at the end of the skiing season, there is a light-hearted competition that takes place in the lake. The skiers run down the hill towards the lake as fast as they can, the idea being to see who can jump the furthest into the lake. All participants are encouraged.
