= The Faction Collective =

Manufacturer of freeride skis and skiing-related products

The Faction Collective S.A.
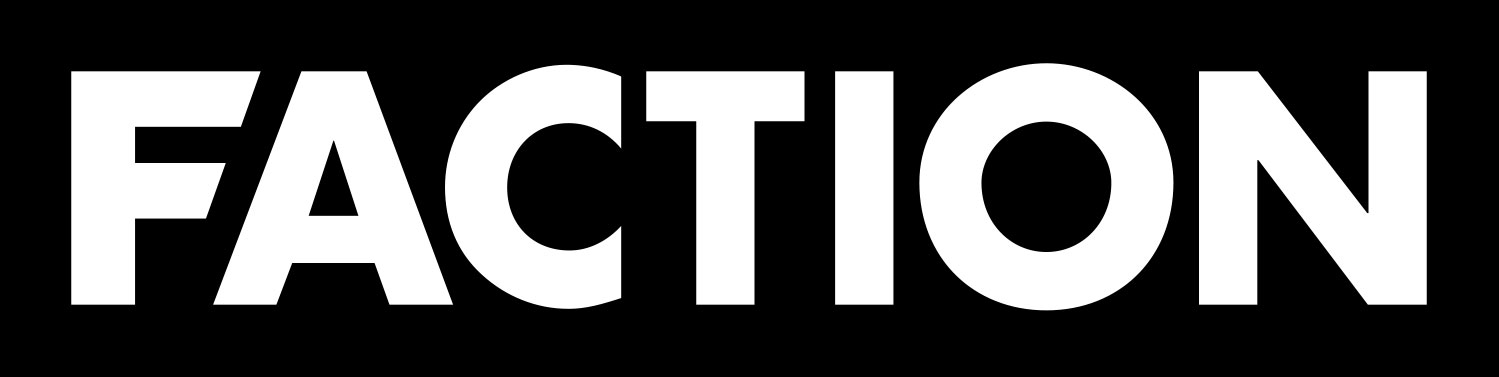
- Trade name: Faction Skis
- Type: Subsidiary
- Industry: Ski design & manufacturing
- Founded: 2006; 20 years ago in Verbier, Valais, Switzerland
- Founders: Alex Hoye; Tony McWilliam
- Headquarters: Verbier, Valais, Switzerland
- Area served: Worldwide
- Key people: Alex Hoye (CEO); Jothan Webb (CFO); Daniel Tanzer (Head of Hardgoods); Henrik Lampert (Head of Marketing); Jens Klanke (Head of Operations); Olivier Garcin (Head of Sales)
- Parent: Full Stack Supply Co.
- Website: factionskis.com

The Faction Collective (also known as Faction Skis or simply Faction) is a Swiss ski equipment design company headquartered in Verbier, in the Swiss canton of Valais. Founded in Verbier in 2006 by a tight-knit group of freeride skiers, Faction now holds brand offices in Switzerland, United States, United Kingdom, France, Japan, Austria and China.

Known for its influence in the freeride and freestyle skiing industry, the brand led a movement in the mid-to-late 2000s to diversify the form factor and design of freestyle and freeride skis. It operates a film & media production operation and manages brand partnerships with leading ski athletes, such as Alex Hall, Eileen Gu, Sam Anthamatten and formerly with Candide Thovex. Its products are sold in over 31 countries, online and through select global distributors.

== History ==
Faction Skis was founded by a group of skiers in 2006 in Verbier. In 2013, Faction Skis teamed up with French professional skier Candide Thovex to develop a range of signature ski models.

== Films ==
The Faction Collective produced three seasons of their web series "We Are The Faction Collective".

In 2017, the company produced the feature film THIS IS HOME featuring skiers Candide Thovex, Kelly Sildaru, and Antti Ollila among others. The film was shot in different locations, including Flathead Valley in Montana, Jyväskylä in Finland, Wasatch Mountains in Utah, La Clusaz in France, Deštné v Orlických horách in the Czech Republic and Zermatt and Verbier in Switzerland. THIS IS HOME was nominated for multiple awards by the Powder Awards, iF3 International Freeski Festival, including Film of the Year, People's Choice, Best Male Street Segment (Antti Ollila) and Discovery of the Year (Alex Hall).

In 2019, Faction produced its second full-length feature film called THE COLLECTIVE featuring skiers Alex Hall, Antti Ollila, Olympic skier Sarah Höfflin, Kelly Sildaru and Sam Anthamatten. The film was nominated for Film of the Year, Best Cinematography, Best Make Freeride Segment (Sam Anthamatten) and Best Male Street Segment (Alex Hall) by the IF3 International Freeski Film Festival and nominated for Best Film at the High Five Awards.

== Team ==
Faction's current pro team consists of Kelly Sildaru, Sam Anthamatten, Eileen Gu, Sarah Hoefflin, Antti Ollila, Alex Hall, Henry Sildaru, Mac Forehand, Matěj Švancer, Dylan Deschamps, Cody Cirillo, and others.

== Product ==
The company currently offers several All-Mountain, Freeride, Freestyle and Touring models. They also offer a range of accessories such as poles, skins and clothing.
