= Étale =

In mathematics, more specifically in algebra, the adjective étale refers to several closely related concepts:

- Étale morphism
  - Formally étale morphism
- Étale cohomology
- Étale topology
- Étale fundamental group
- Étale group scheme
- Étale algebra

== Other ==
- Étale (mountain) in Savoie and Haute-Savoie, France

== See also ==
- Étalé space
- Etail, or online commerce
