= Charvet (surname) =

Charvet is a French surname. Notable people with the surname include:

- Adèle Charvet (born 1983), French mezzo-soprano
- Anne-Marie Charvet (born 1947), a French civil servant (prefect)
- David Charvet (born 1972), American actor born in France
- Jean-Gabriel Charvet (1750–1829), French artist and draftsman known for his scenic wallpaper designs
- John Charvet, British political theorist and emeritus professor
- Laurent Charvet (born 1973), French footballer

== See also ==
- Charvet (disambiguation)
