= Thovex =

Thovex is a surname of Arpitan origin. Like many polysyllabic Arpitan anthroponyms, the final -x marks oxytonic stress (on the last syllable), whereas the final -z indicates paroxytonic stress (on the penultimate syllable) and should not be pronounced, although in French it is often mispronounced due to hypercorrection.

Notable people with the surname include:

- Candide Thovex (born 1982), a French professional skier, filmmaker and entrepreneur
- Mirabelle Thovex (born 1991), a French snowboarder
