= La Croix Fry =

Village in Manigod, Haute-Savoie, France

Coordinates: 45°52′37″N 6°24′11″E

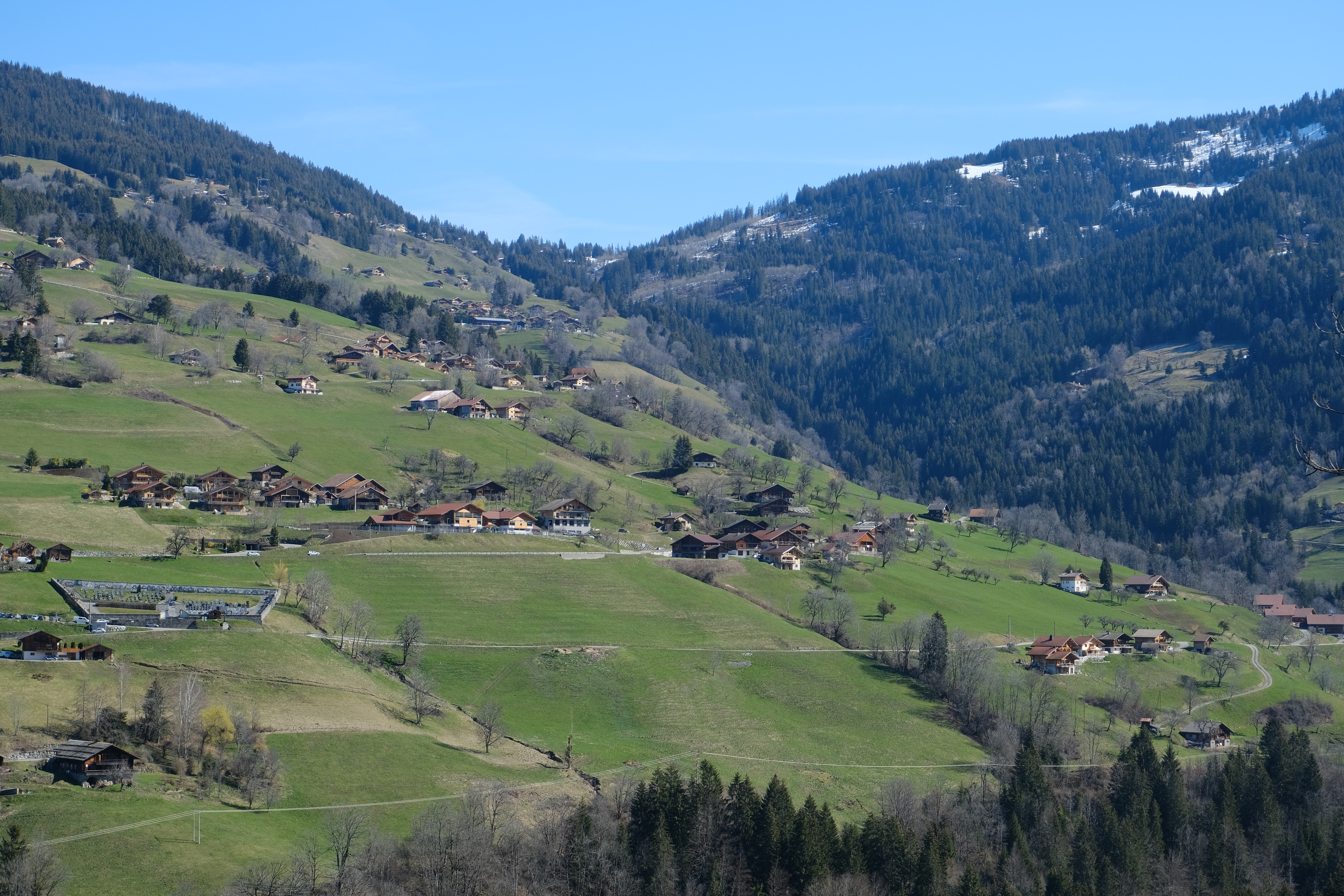
A view of the Col de la Croix Fry in the commune of Manigod

La Croix Fry (French pronunciation: [la kʁwa fʁi]) is a small village contained within the domain of Manigod, Haute-Savoie, France. With a population of under 600, it is a popular site for hill walking on the Plateau de Beauregard as well as skiing in the winter.

It is located in between the large skiing town of La Clusaz and the village of Manigod; the Col de la Croix Fry, nearby, is part of the Tour de France route through the Haute-Savoie department.
