= Charvet (disambiguation) =

Charvet is a French high-end shirt maker and tailor.

Charvet may also refer to:

- Charvet (surname), including a list of people wityh the name
- Charvet (fabric), woven of silk or acetate
- Mont Charvet, a mountain in the Aravis Range in Savoie, France
