= OEX =

OEX may refer to:

- Orbital experiments, by NASA
- Château-d'Œx, Switzerland
- Oëx, France
- S&P 100 ticker symbol
