= Ollila =

Ollila is a Finnish surname. Notable people with the surname include:

- Yrjö Ollila (1887–1932), Finnish impressionist painter, designer and muralist
- Les Ollila (born 1943), American evangelist
- Jorma Ollila (born 1950), Finnish businessman
- Antti Ollila (born 1994), Finnish freestyle skier
