= Manigod =

Manigod Manegôd (Arpitan)
- Commune
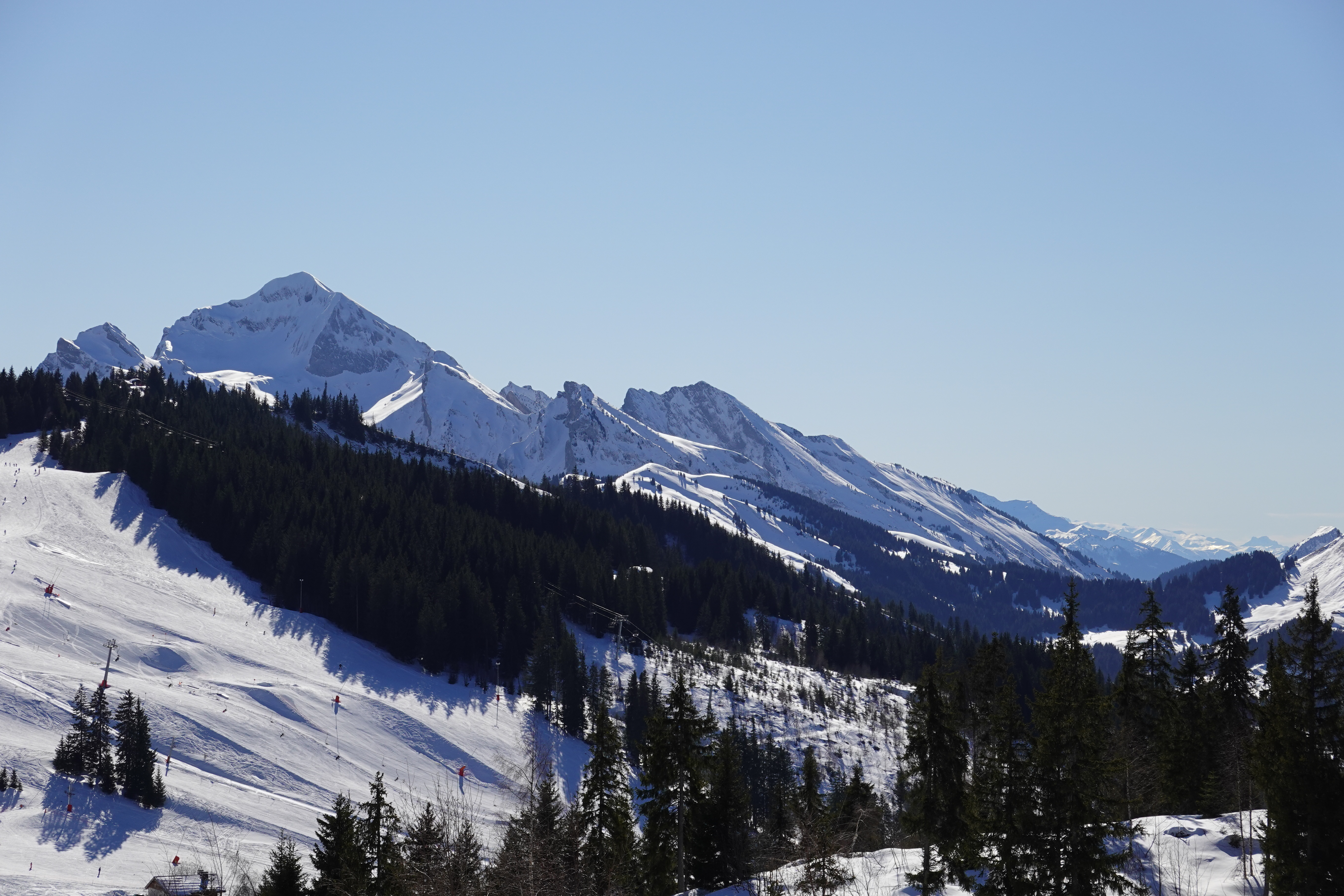
- View of Mont Charvin from Manigod
- Location of Manigod
- Location within France Location within Auvergne-Rhône-Alpes
- Coordinates: 45°51′42″N 6°22′14″E
- Country: France
- Region: Auvergne-Rhône-Alpes
- Department: Haute-Savoie
- Arrondissement: Annecy
- Canton: Faverges
- Intercommunality: CC des Vallées de Thônes

Government
  - Mayor (2020–2026): Stéphane Chausson
- Area^{1}: 44.12 km^{2} (17.03 sq mi)
- Highest elevation: 2,485 m (8,153 ft)
- Lowest elevation: 719 m (2,359 ft)
- Population (2023): 1,000
  - Density: 23/km^{2} (59/sq mi)
- Demonym: Manigodins / Manigodines
- Time zone: UTC+01:00 (CET)
  - Summer (DST): UTC+02:00 (CEST)
- INSEE/Postal code: 74160 /74230
- ^{1} French Land Register data, which excludes lakes, ponds, glaciers > 1 km^{2} (0.386 sq mi or 247 acres) and river estuaries.

Manigod (French pronunciation: [maniɡo]; Arpitan: Manegôd) is a commune in the Haute-Savoie department in the Auvergne-Rhône-Alpes region of Eastern France. As of 2023, the population of the commune was 1,000.

== Geography ==
The linked area of Manigod consists of several different ski areas: La Croix Fry, Merdassier, Manigod Village, among others. The village itself is small and traditional with very few shops, all selling local produce such as Reblochon. The Plateau de Beauregard is a famous local walk with a view of Mont Blanc. The River Fier has its source in the commune. Nearby villages include Thônes, La Clusaz, Saint-Jean-de-Sixt and Le Grand Bornand. Further away are the larger cities of Annecy (prefecture) and Chamonix.

== Gallery ==
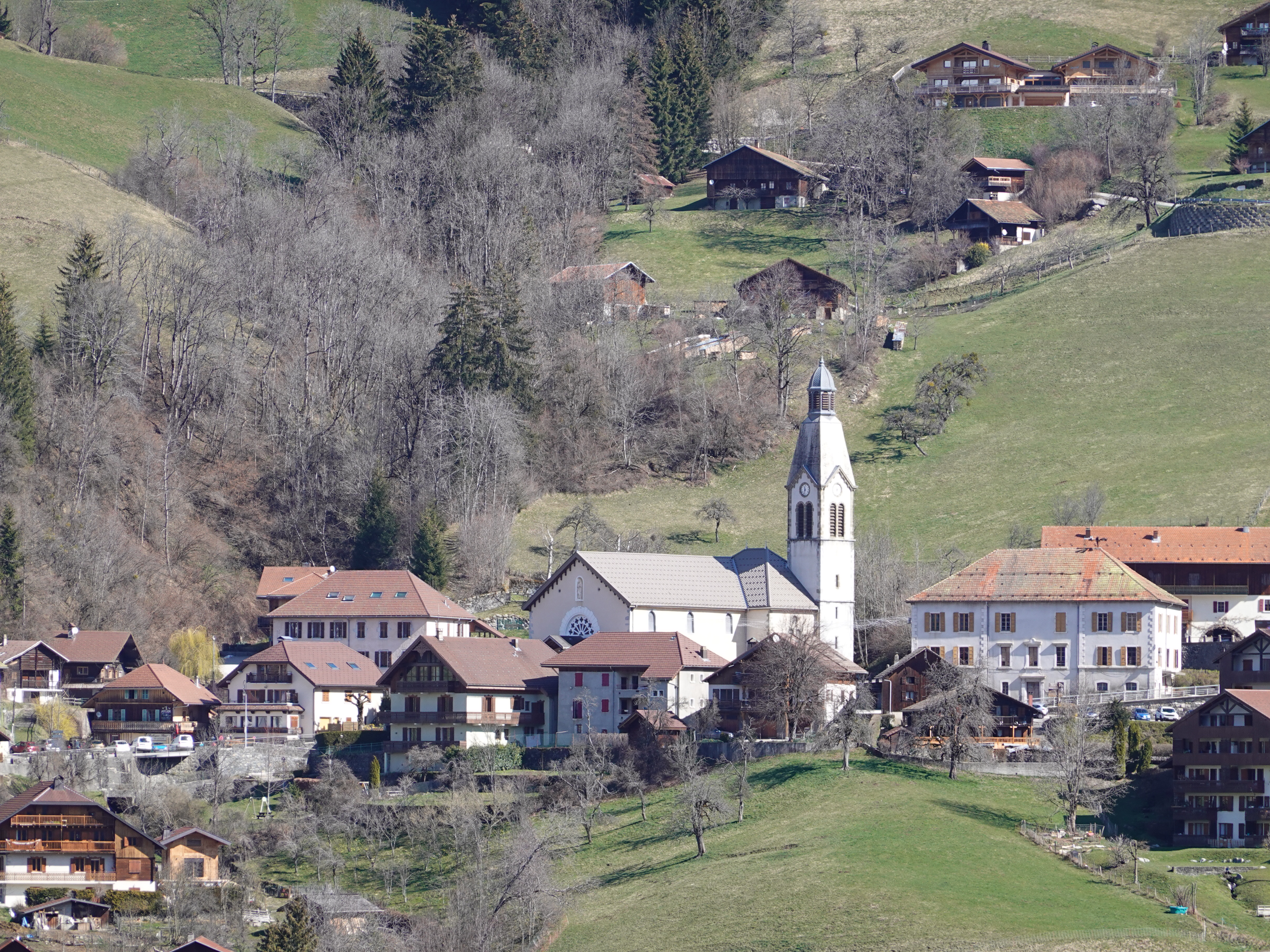
Église Saint-Pierre

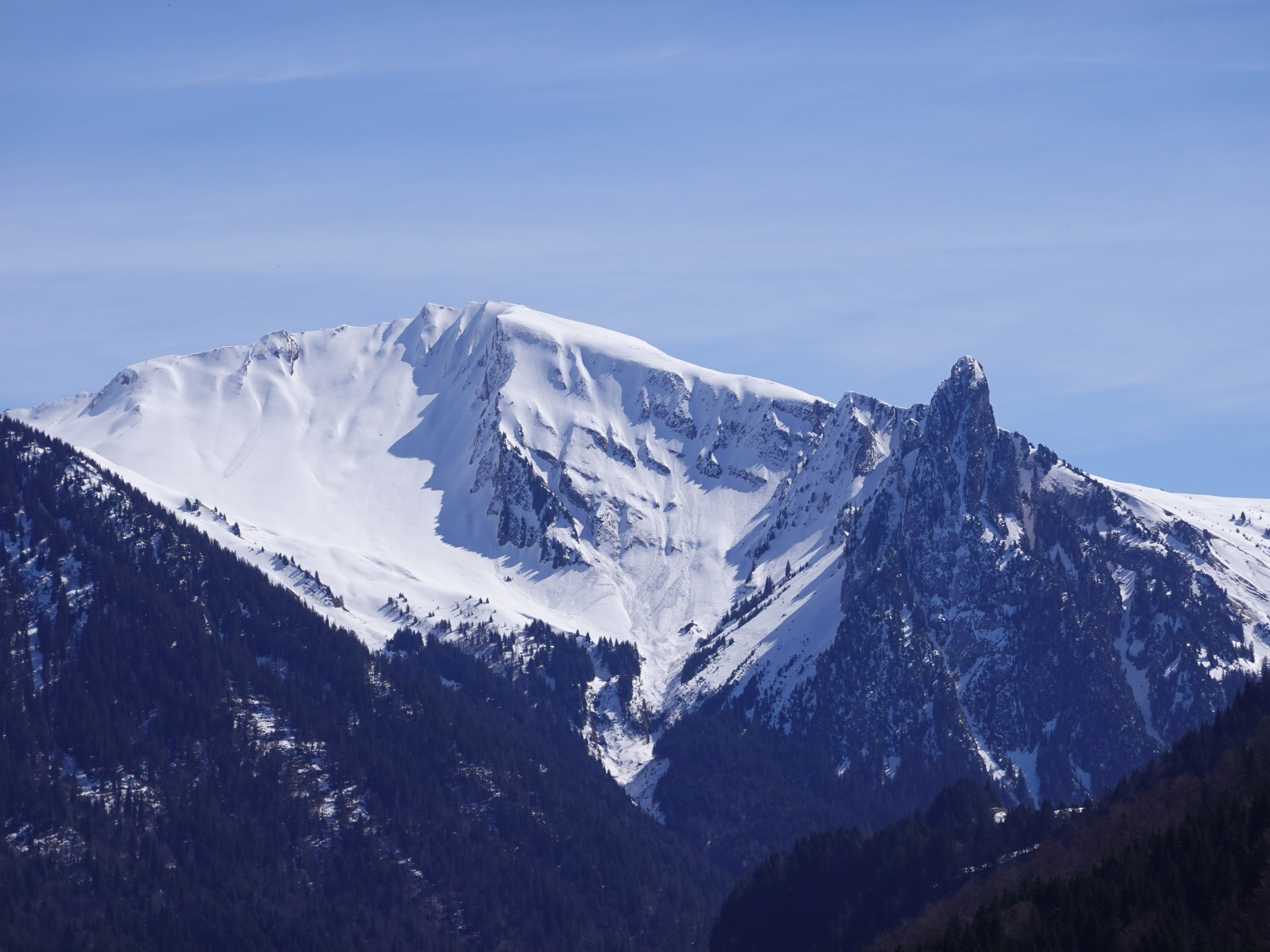
Aiguille de Manigod

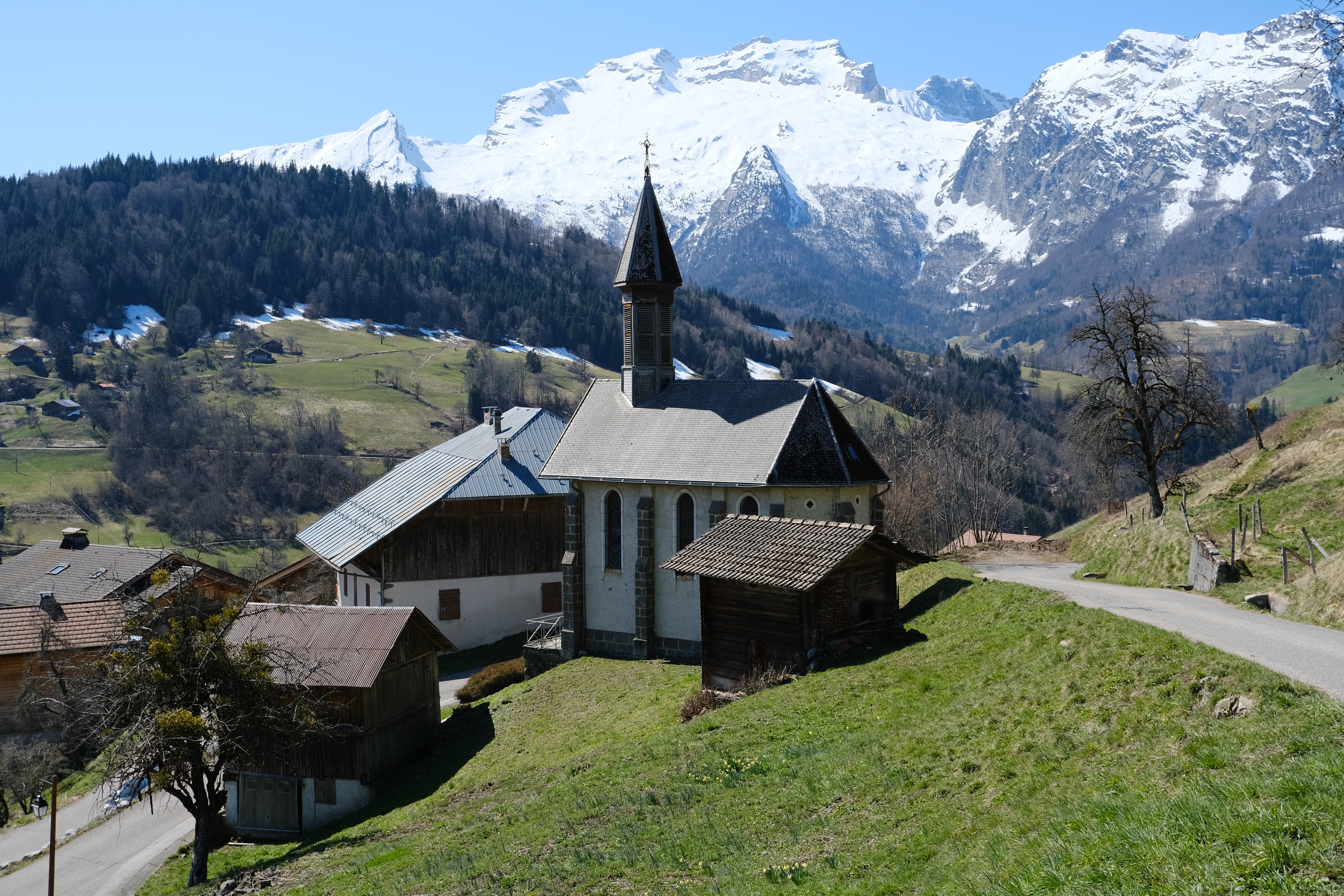
Chapelle de Villard-Dessous

== See also ==
- Communes of the Haute-Savoie department
