= Saint-Jean-de-Sixt =

- Commune
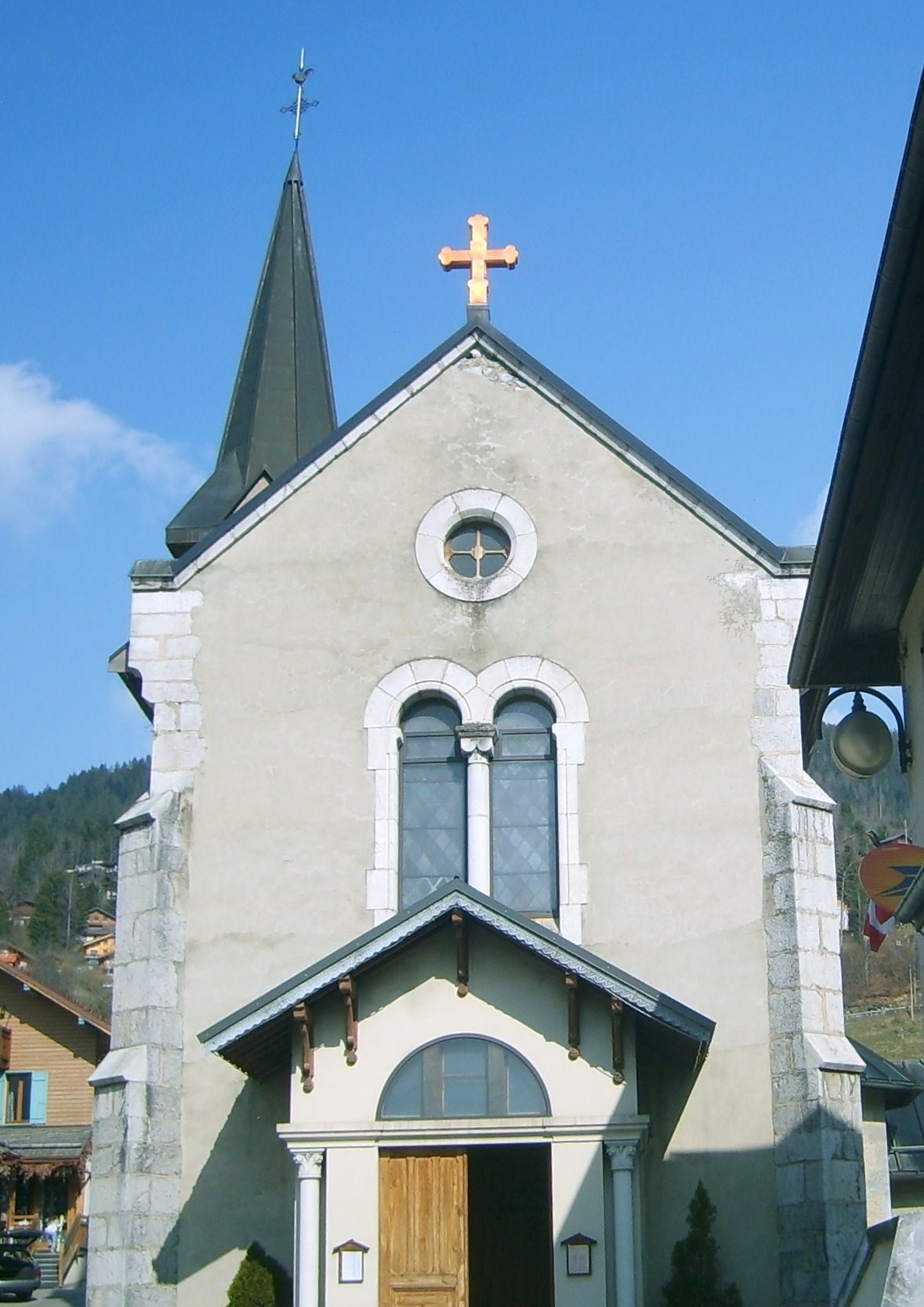
- The church in Saint-Jean-de-Sixt
- Location of Saint-Jean-de-Sixt
- Location within France Location within Auvergne-Rhône-Alpes
- Coordinates: 45°55′26″N 6°24′38″E
- Country: France
- Region: Auvergne-Rhône-Alpes
- Department: Haute-Savoie
- Arrondissement: Annecy
- Canton: Faverges
- Intercommunality: Vallées de Thônes

Government
  - Mayor (2020–2026): Didier Lathuille
- Area^{1}: 12.21 km^{2} (4.71 sq mi)
- Elevation: 963 m (3,159 ft)
- Highest elevation: 1,860 m (6,100 ft)
- Lowest elevation: 828 m (2,717 ft)
- Population (2023): 1,561
  - Density: 127.8/km^{2} (331.1/sq mi)
- Time zone: UTC+01:00 (CET)
  - Summer (DST): UTC+02:00 (CEST)
- INSEE/Postal code: 74239 /74450
- ^{1} French Land Register data, which excludes lakes, ponds, glaciers > 1 km^{2} (0.386 sq mi or 247 acres) and river estuaries.

Saint-Jean-de-Sixt (French pronunciation: [sɛ̃ ʒɑ̃ də sikst]; Arpitan: Si, Sent-Jian-de-Sixt) is a commune in the Haute-Savoie department in the Auvergne-Rhône-Alpes region in southeastern France.

It lies in the Aravis Range of the French Alps. The inhabitants are the Saintjeandais or Saintjeandins.

The village used to be called Villaret, when it was a part of the Savoyard state, prior to its incorporation into France in 1860.

== Nearby ==
Nearby villages include Manigod, Thônes, Le Grand Bornand, La Clusaz and the larger Chamonix and Annecy.

== Notable inhabitants ==
- Saint Peter Faber, S.J., one of the founders of the Jesuit Order, was born here.

== See also ==
- Communes of the Haute-Savoie department
- first bungee jump off a ramp in the word : Bun J Ride
