= Le Grand-Bornand =

- Commune
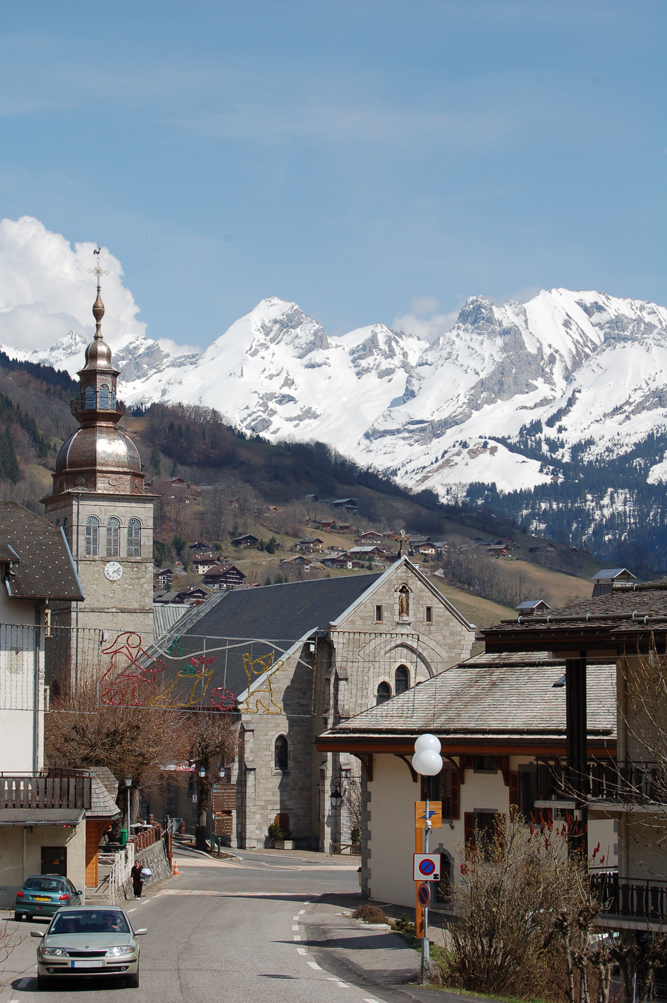
- The Roman Catholic church in Le Grand-Bornand, March 2006.

- Coat of arms
- Location of Le Grand-Bornand
- Location within France Location within Auvergne-Rhône-Alpes
- Coordinates: 45°56′33″N 6°25′33″E
- Country: France
- Region: Auvergne-Rhône-Alpes
- Department: Haute-Savoie
- Arrondissement: Annecy
- Canton: Faverges

Government
  - Mayor (2020–2026): André Perrillat-Amédé
- Area^{1}: 61 km^{2} (24 sq mi)
- Population (2023): 2,050
  - Density: 34/km^{2} (87/sq mi)
- Time zone: UTC+01:00 (CET)
  - Summer (DST): UTC+02:00 (CEST)
- INSEE/Postal code: 74136 /
- ^{1} French Land Register data, which excludes lakes, ponds, glaciers > 1 km^{2} (0.386 sq mi or 247 acres) and river estuaries.

Le Grand-Bornand (French pronunciation: [lə ɡʁɑ̃ bɔʁnɑ̃]; Arpitan: Bornan) is a commune in the eastern French department of Haute-Savoie. The commune is a ski resort and takes its name from the river that runs through it. The inhabitants of Le Grand-Bornand are called Bornandins.

== Geography ==
Located on the western slope of the Aravis mountain range not far from Mont Blanc, Annecy Lake and Switzerland, Le Grand-Bornand is a summer and winter resort which developed around an old village. Le Grand-Bornand is in a wide part of the valley which has allowed it to develop – the village of Petit-Bornand, located downstream, is in a narrower part of the valley. The commune of Le Grand-Bornand is made-up of three areas: the Bouchet valley, the Chinaillon valley and the village of Le Grand-Bornand located at the junction of the two valleys. The hamlet of Chinaillon to the north east of Le Grand-Bornand is the main ski centre. The valley of Bouchet is located upstream of the village along the course of the river Borne.

=== Climate ===
Climate data for Le Grand-Bornard, 1430m (1991−2020 normals, extremes 2005−present)
Month	Jan	Feb	Mar	Apr	May	Jun	Jul	Aug	Sep	Oct	Nov	Dec	Year
Record high °C (°F)	12.2 (54.0)	12.7 (54.9)	14.7 (58.5)	22.2 (72.0)	26.3 (79.3)	31.6 (88.9)	30.4 (86.7)	30.4 (86.7)	27.0 (80.6)	24.4 (75.9)	18.2 (64.8)	12.2 (54.0)	31.6 (88.9)
Mean daily maximum °C (°F)	1.4 (34.5)	2.3 (36.1)	5.7 (42.3)	9.8 (49.6)	13.4 (56.1)	18.0 (64.4)	20.6 (69.1)	19.8 (67.6)	16.4 (61.5)	12.7 (54.9)	6.5 (43.7)	2.5 (36.5)	10.8 (51.4)
Daily mean °C (°F)	−1.7 (28.9)	−1.6 (29.1)	1.6 (34.9)	5.9 (42.6)	9.2 (48.6)	13.5 (56.3)	15.8 (60.4)	15.3 (59.5)	12.1 (53.8)	8.7 (47.7)	3.4 (38.1)	−0.4 (31.3)	6.8 (44.2)
Mean daily minimum °C (°F)	−4.7 (23.5)	−5.4 (22.3)	−2.4 (27.7)	2.0 (35.6)	5.1 (41.2)	9.1 (48.4)	11.1 (52.0)	10.7 (51.3)	7.8 (46.0)	4.8 (40.6)	0.3 (32.5)	−3.2 (26.2)	2.9 (37.2)
Record low °C (°F)	−17.4 (0.7)	−24.1 (−11.4)	−17.2 (1.0)	−10.5 (13.1)	−4.4 (24.1)	−1.4 (29.5)	1.5 (34.7)	2.3 (36.1)	−1.9 (28.6)	−8.9 (16.0)	−13.5 (7.7)	−17.1 (1.2)	−24.1 (−11.4)
Average precipitation mm (inches)	186.1 (7.33)	153.5 (6.04)	159.5 (6.28)	114.7 (4.52)	188.2 (7.41)	144.1 (5.67)	145.5 (5.73)	157.9 (6.22)	116.6 (4.59)	125.3 (4.93)	157.6 (6.20)	225.2 (8.87)	1,874.2 (73.79)
Average precipitation days (≥ 1.0 mm)	13.1	11.6	12.4	10.2	15.4	12.3	10.5	11.3	9.4	9.8	10.9	13.3	140.3
Source: Météo-France

Climate data for Grand Bornand, 1300m (1991−2020 normals, extremes 1968−present)
Month	Jan	Feb	Mar	Apr	May	Jun	Jul	Aug	Sep	Oct	Nov	Dec	Year
Record high °C (°F)	15.0 (59.0)	15.0 (59.0)	19.5 (67.1)	22.0 (71.6)	27.5 (81.5)	32.0 (89.6)	33.0 (91.4)	31.6 (88.9)	27.0 (80.6)	24.5 (76.1)	19.5 (67.1)	15.5 (59.9)	33.0 (91.4)
Mean daily maximum °C (°F)	3.4 (38.1)	3.8 (38.8)	7.0 (44.6)	10.4 (50.7)	14.8 (58.6)	18.8 (65.8)	21.0 (69.8)	20.8 (69.4)	16.7 (62.1)	12.8 (55.0)	7.1 (44.8)	3.9 (39.0)	11.7 (53.1)
Daily mean °C (°F)	−0.2 (31.6)	−0.2 (31.6)	2.8 (37.0)	6.0 (42.8)	10.2 (50.4)	13.9 (57.0)	16.1 (61.0)	16.0 (60.8)	12.2 (54.0)	8.7 (47.7)	3.6 (38.5)	0.5 (32.9)	7.5 (45.4)
Mean daily minimum °C (°F)	−3.9 (25.0)	−4.2 (24.4)	−1.3 (29.7)	1.6 (34.9)	5.6 (42.1)	9.1 (48.4)	11.2 (52.2)	11.3 (52.3)	7.8 (46.0)	4.6 (40.3)	0.0 (32.0)	−2.9 (26.8)	3.2 (37.8)
Record low °C (°F)	−25.2 (−13.4)	−22.0 (−7.6)	−21.1 (−6.0)	−12.6 (9.3)	−7.0 (19.4)	−1.5 (29.3)	1.1 (34.0)	1.0 (33.8)	−2.8 (27.0)	−9.5 (14.9)	−15.0 (5.0)	−20.0 (−4.0)	−25.2 (−13.4)
Average precipitation mm (inches)	184.0 (7.24)	158.6 (6.24)	158.4 (6.24)	145.5 (5.73)	169.9 (6.69)	157.4 (6.20)	149.4 (5.88)	162.1 (6.38)	147.4 (5.80)	158.1 (6.22)	177.3 (6.98)	215.0 (8.46)	1,983.1 (78.06)
Average precipitation days (≥ 1.0 mm)	12.3	10.7	11.4	11.7	14.1	12.0	11.0	11.2	10.6	11.6	12.3	12.6	141.5
Source: Meteociel

== Nearby ==
Nearby villages include Manigod, Thônes, La Clusaz, Saint-Jean-de-Sixt and the larger Chamonix and Annecy.

== History ==
- 1569: Church fire
- 1715: Opening of a school
- 1755: End of the dispute with neighbouring village La Clusaz on the delimitation between the territories of the two villages
- 11 March 1817: Violent earthquake causes property damage
- 28 October 1923: Creation of a ski club, the "société des skieurs bornandins".
- 24 August 1944: 76 troops from the Vichy government's militia, condemned to death on 23 August by a court martial of the French Forces of the Interior and after a parody of a trial, are publicly shot close to the Peseretaz wood. 44 were buried in a cemetery created on the spot in the Bouchet valley.
- 14 July 1987: A brutal and unforeseeable flood of the Borne river, following a violent storm over the mountain, submerges the valley and devastates in particular the campsite of Le Grand-Bornand. There are 21 fatalities and two missing persons. The commune and the State were forced to compensate the families of the victims as the campsite had been located on the river floodplain.
- 11 April 2003: property developer, Xavier Flactif, and his family are killed in their country cottage in Chinaillon by a neighbour, David Hotyat.
- 22 July 2004: The village is the finish for a stage of the 2004 Tour de France. Lance Armstrong wins after a stage of 204.5 km (127.1 mi) from Le Bourg-d'Oisans. He was later stripped of this and many other wins for doping.
- 22 February 2006: Roddy Darragon wins a silver medal in a ski sprint at the 2006 Winter Olympics in Turin and the following day, Sylvie Becaert takes the bronze medal in the biathlon.

=== Twinning ===
Since 1997, Le Grand Bornand is twinned with Quiberon.

=== Place names ===
Researcher toponymist and Ph.D. graduate of the Sorbonne, Jérémie Delorme, has listed, photographed and described, about 3,000 place names in the commune. 90% come from Latin, 8% come from Gaulish, 1% from Germanic and 1% from pre-Latin languages. A third of the names refer to former occupants. Names ending in "ière" are pre 16th-century and names ending in "lhon" are pre 5th-century.

== Population ==
Historical population
Year	Pop.	±% p.a.
1968	1,533	—
1975	1,606	+0.67%
1982	1,695	+0.77%
1990	1,925	+1.60%
1999	2,115	+1.05%
2007	2,195	+0.47%
2012	2,189	−0.05%
2017	2,118	−0.66%
2023	2,050	−0.54%
Source: INSEE

== Administration ==
List of successive mayors
Term	Name
1971–1977	Jean Bastard Rosset
1983–1989	Pierre Pochat-Cottilloux
1989–2008	André Perrillat-Amédé
2008–2011	Gérard Perrissin-Fabert
2011–2014	Philippe Angelloz-Nicoud
2014–incumbent	André Perrillat-Amédé

== Places and monuments ==
- Church of the Virgin Mary of the Assumption: it has been confirmed this church dates from 1346. It was partially destroyed by a fire in 1569 and the bell-tower completely rebuilt in 1661. It was completely rebuilt in 1877. The bell-tower, finished in 1845, is remarkable for its Baroque outer shell.
- Chinaillon chapel
- Bouchet chapel
- Nant-Robert chapel
- Gramusset refuge
- Maroly virtual lake
- Militiamen cemetery

== People ==
- Roddy Darragon: silver medalist in cross-country skiing individual sprint event in the 2006 Winter Olympics
- Sylvie Becaert: bronze medalist in the biathlon at the 2006 Winter Olympics and 2005 world champion
- Christophe Perrillat: French cross-country skiing team member at the 2006 Winter Olympics
- Steve Missillier: member of the 2007 French Alpine skiing team
- Sebastien Baker-Bidoz: former member of the French Alpine skiing team
- Tessa Worley: member of the French Alpine skiing team. 2013 and 2017 world champion in the alpine skiing giant slalom event.

== Economy ==
- Tourism: ski resort. Le Grand-Bornand holds the award "Station verte de vacances" (Green holiday resort).
- Winter sports: The station is highly rated for beginner skiers and family holidays. However, although there are a few good restaurants, there is minimal nightlife.
- Agriculture: Le Grand-Bornand is one of the birthplaces of reblochon, a cheese produced from abondancière, tarine and montbéliarde cows raised on Crau hay.
- Companies:
  - Aravis Boissons has manufactured Forclaz lemonade since 1870 according to the same, original recipe (water + sugar + bubbles)

== Facilities ==
- Village hall
- Social housing
- Swimming pool
- Mini golf
- Golf
- Tennis
- Trampoline

== Outdoor activities ==
- Biathlon
- Skiing
- Snowboarding
- Cross-country skiing
- Hiking
- Mountain-biking
- Excursions
- Dodes forest
- Mushroom collecting
- Via Ferrata

== Events ==
- "To happiness of the kids", children's festival
- "To each their turn" (June 2007) Publicity in schools by the organisers of the Tour de France, to develop the image of "the outer loop" for future generations of consumers.
- July 15–16, 2007: Arrival of 7th stage of the Tour de France 2007 (Bourg-en-Bresse – Le Grand-Bornand) and departure of 8th stage of the Tour de France 2007, 165 kilometres between Le Grand-Bornand and Tignes.
- Alps Mountain festival (at the beginning of August)
- Ball of the conscripts, organized in May each year
- Week of the mountain, discovering local fauna and flora. One evening is organized by the mountain security and the Office of mountain Guides. In 2007 it is from 21 to 27 July.
- The town will host biathlon for the 2030 Winter Olympics and Para biathlon for the 2030 Winter Paralympics in the French Alps.

== Tour de France ==
Le Grand-Bornand has been the start town for three stages of the Tour de France, in 1995, 1999 and 2007. It was the finish of a stage in 2004, 2007, 2009 and 2013. Stage 8 of the 2021 Tour de France finished here.

=== Finishes ===
Year	Stage	Start point	Distance (km)	Stage winner	Yellow jersey
2021	8	Oyonnax	151	Dylan Teuns (BEL)	Tadej Pogačar (SLO)
2018	10	Annecy	159	Julian Alaphilippe (FRA)	Greg Van Avermaet (BEL)
2013	19	Le Bourg-d'Oisans	204.5	Rui Costa (POR)	Chris Froome (GBR)
2009	17	Bourg-Saint-Maurice	169.5	Fränk Schleck (LUX)	Alberto Contador (ESP)
2007	7	Bourg-en-Bresse	197.5	Linus Gerdemann (GER)	Linus Gerdemann (GER)
2004	17	Le Bourg-d'Oisans	204.5	~~Lance Armstrong (USA)~~	~~Lance Armstrong (USA)~~

=== Departures ===
Year	Stage	Finish point	Distance (km)	Stage winner	Yellow jersey
2007	8	Tignes	165	Michael Rasmussen (DEN)	Michael Rasmussen (DEN)
1999	9	Sestrières	213.5	~~Lance Armstrong (USA)~~	~~Lance Armstrong (USA)~~
1995	9	La Plagne	160	Alex Zülle (SUI)	Miguel Induráin (ESP)
