= Pointe d'Areu =

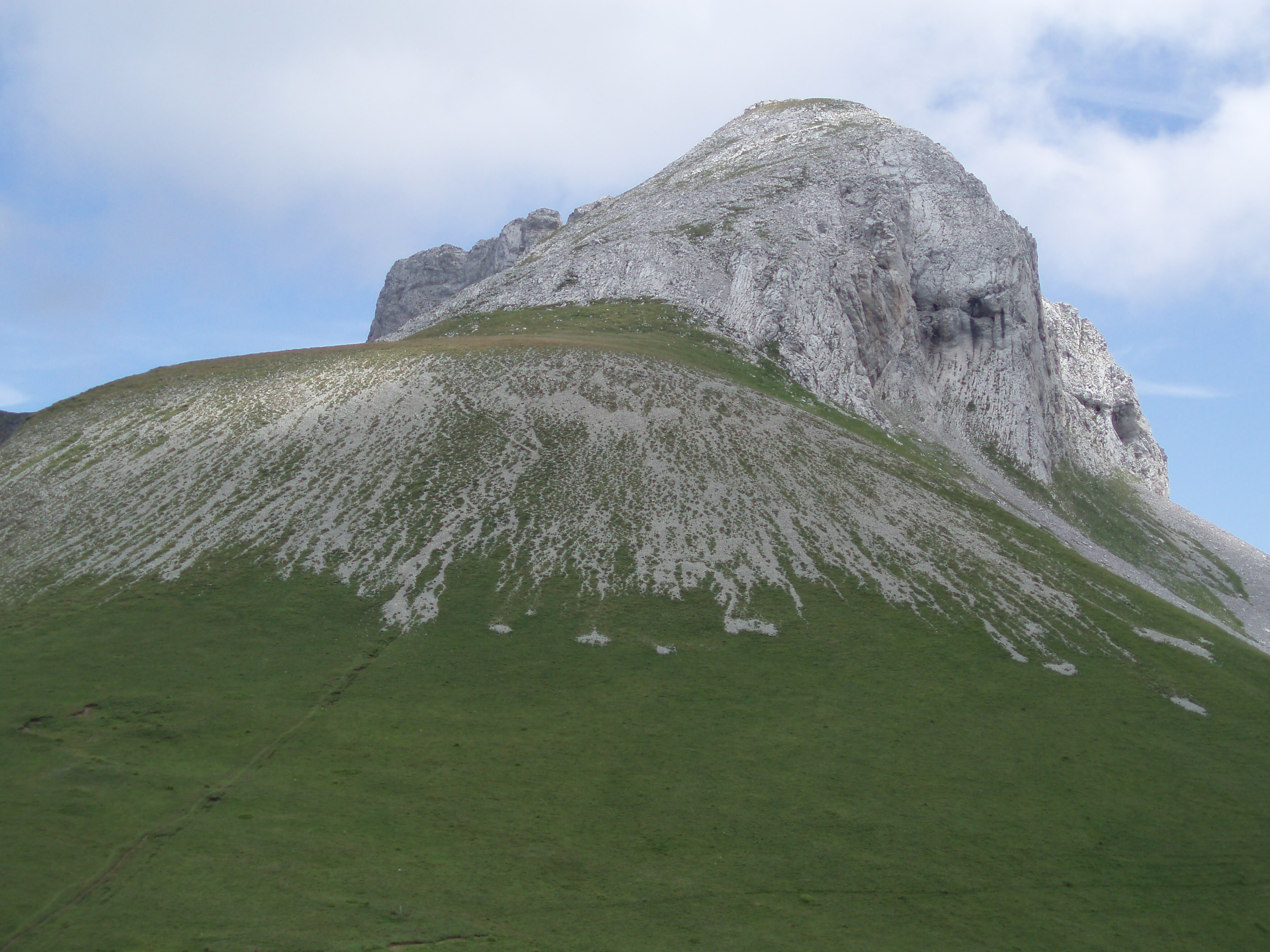
- Pointe D'Areu

Highest point
- Elevation: 2,478 m (8,130 ft)
- Coordinates: 45°58′54″N 06°34′46″E

Geography
- Location within France
- Location: Haute-Savoie, France
- Parent range: Aravis Range

Pointe d'Areu is a mountain in Haute-Savoie, France. It lies in the Aravis Range, above Oëx in the Arve valley, and has an altitude of 2,478 metres above sea level.
