= Parrossaz =

Mountain in Savoie, France

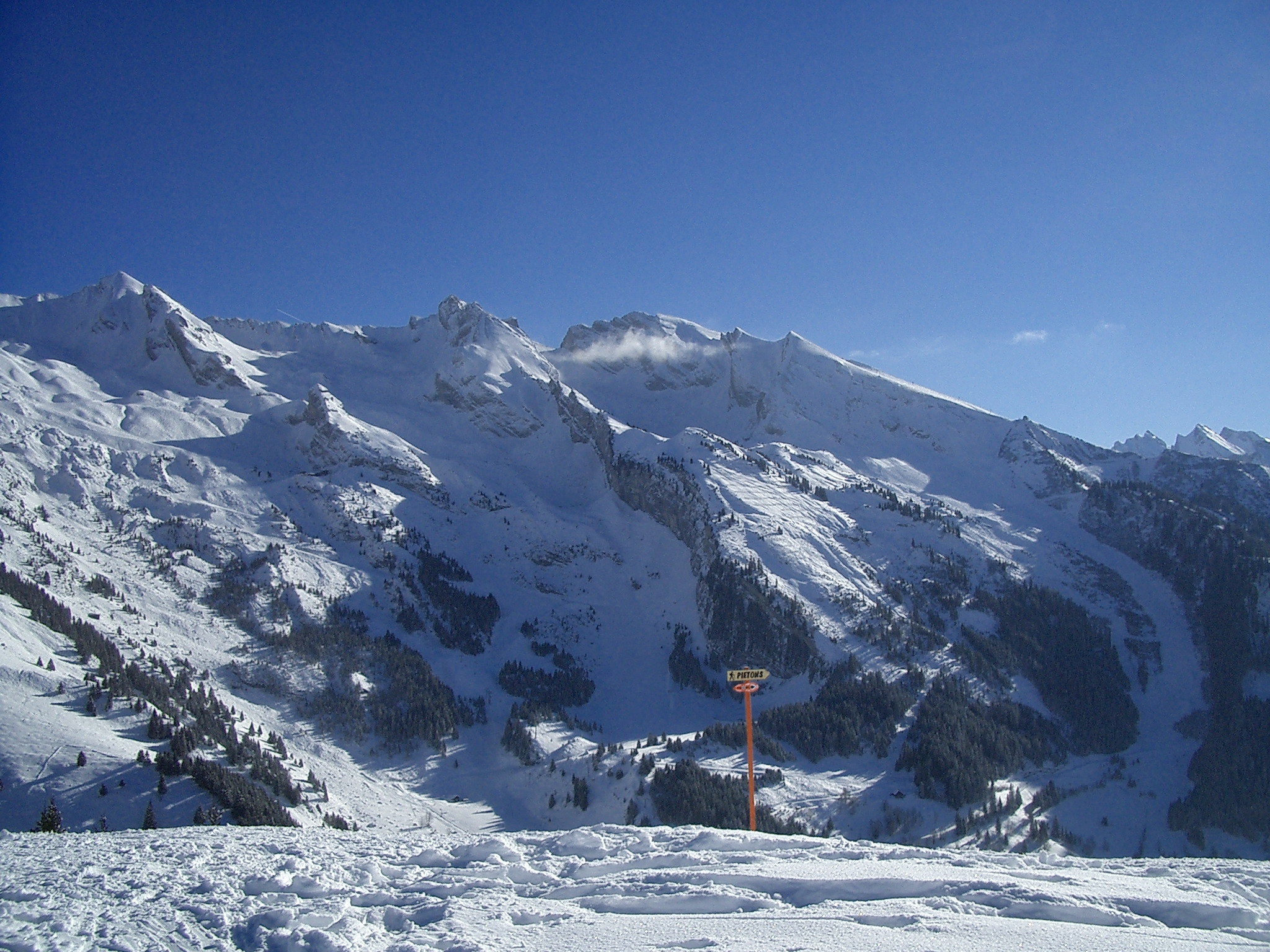

Highest point
- Elevation: 2,556 m (8,386 ft)
- Coordinates: 45°53′17″N 06°29′06″E

Geography
- Location within France
- Location: Savoie and Haute-Savoie, France
- Parent range: Aravis

Parrossaz is a mountain of Savoie and Haute-Savoie, France. It lies in the Aravis range. It has an elevation of 2,556 metres above sea level.
