= Roche Perfia =

Mountain in France

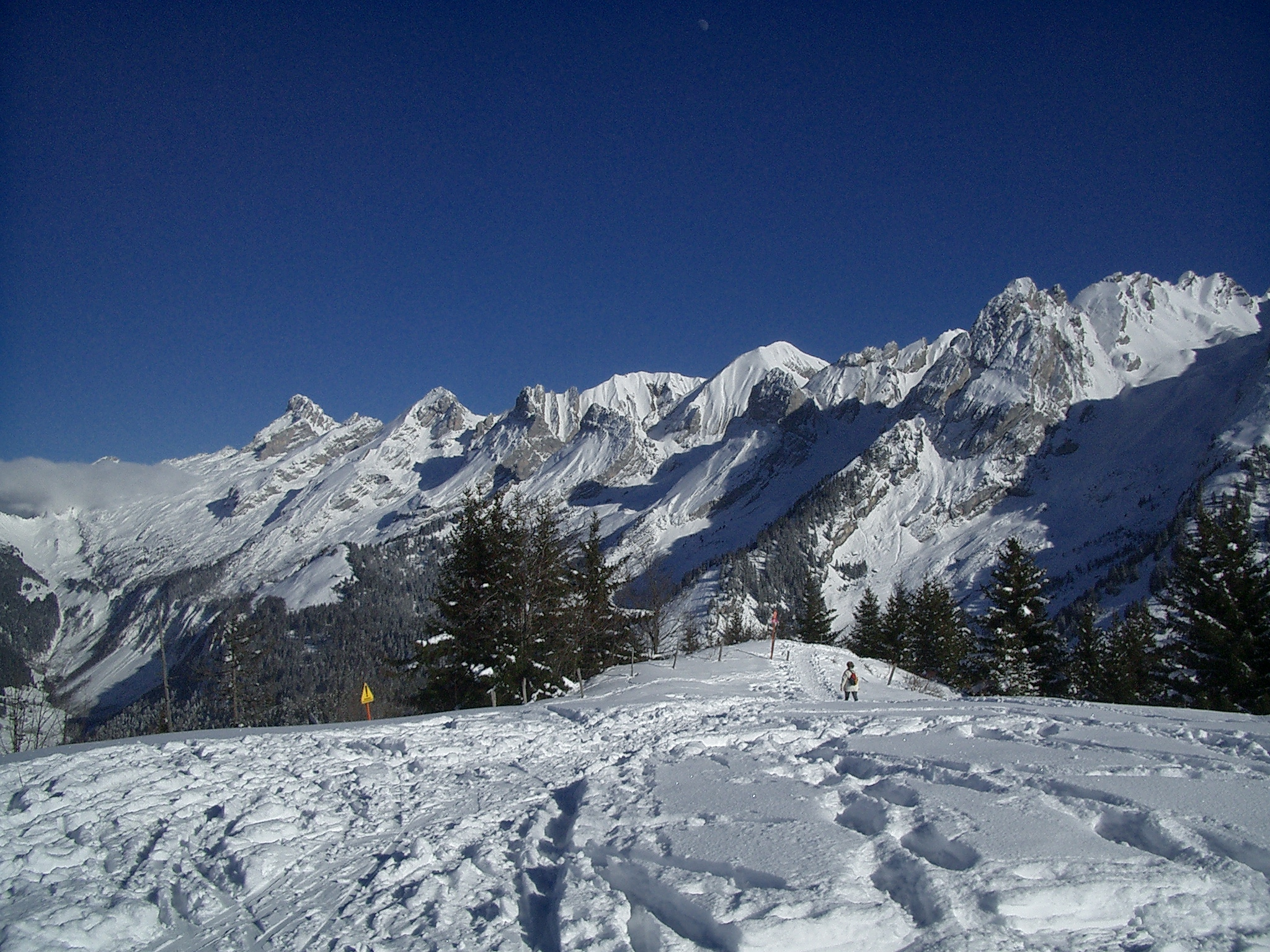

Highest point
- Elevation: 2,499 m (8,199 ft)
- Coordinates: 45°54′52″N 06°30′49″E

Geography
- Location within France
- Location: Haute-Savoie, France
- Parent range: Aravis Range

The Roche Perfia (2,499 m) is a mountain in the Aravis Range in Haute-Savoie, France.
