= Aiguille de Borderan =

Mountain in Savoie, France

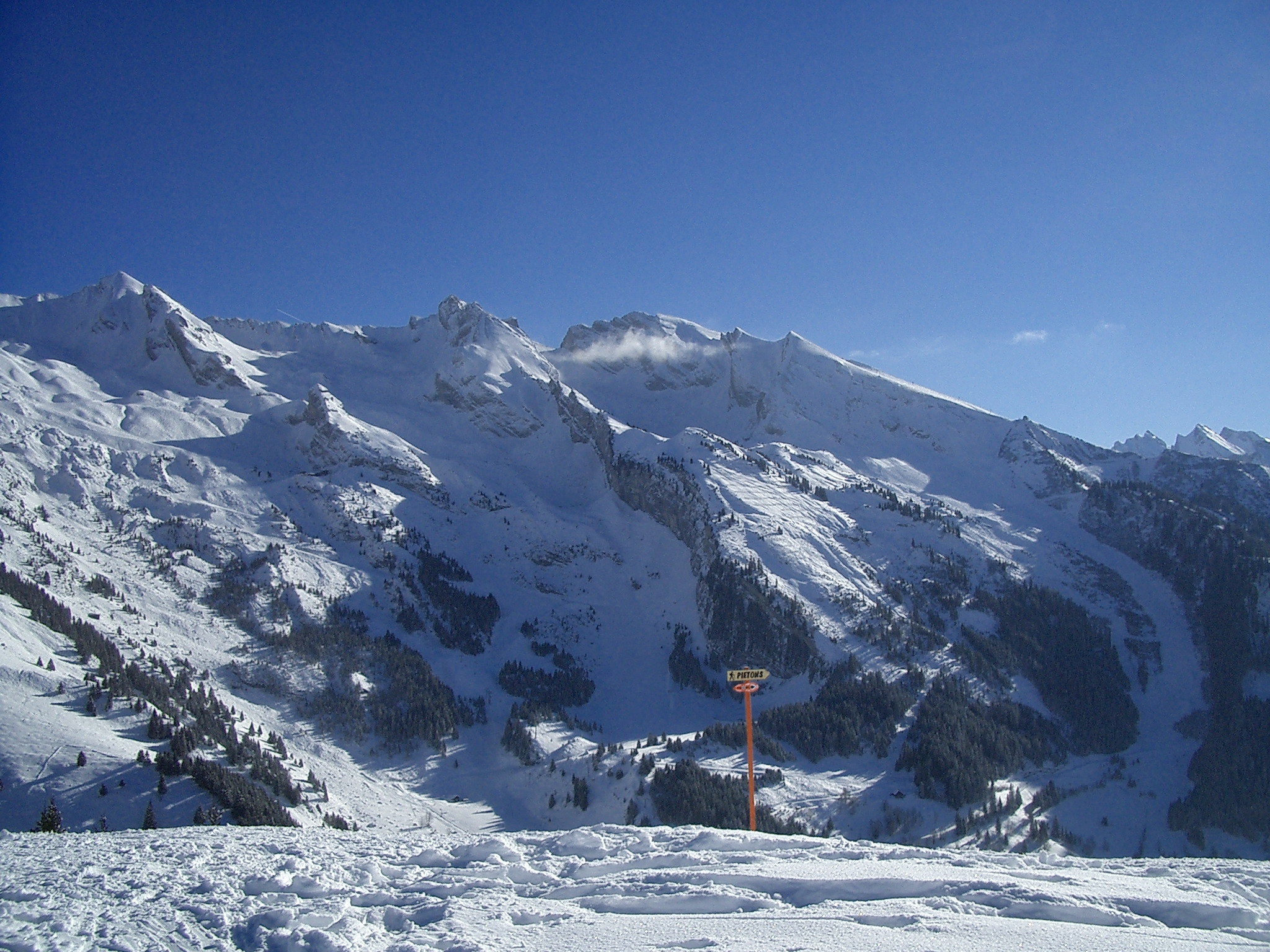

Highest point
- Elevation: 2,492 m (8,176 ft)
- Coordinates: 45°53′11″N 06°28′40″E

Geography
- Location within France
- Location: Savoie and Haute-Savoie, France
- Parent range: Aravis Range

The Aiguille de Borderan (2,492 m) is a mountain in the Aravis Massif in Savoie and Haute-Savoie, France.
