= Duncan Ivison =

Political scientist and academic (born 1965)

Duncan Ivison FRSN FAHA
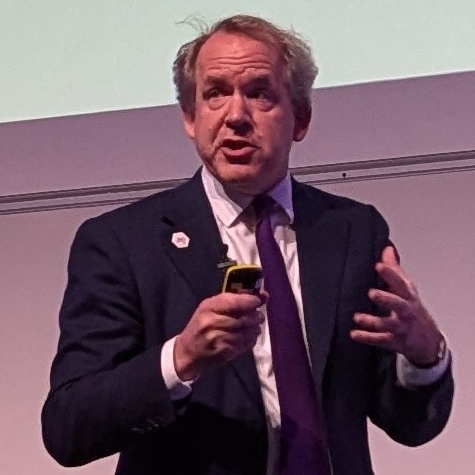
- Ivison delivering the Foundation Day lecture at the University Place, Manchester in 2024
- Born: Duncan Mackenzie Ivison; 1965 (age 60–61); Montreal, Canada
- Partner: Diana Irving
- Children: Two

Academic background
- Education: McGill University (BA); London School of Economics (MSc, PhD)
- Thesis: Liberty and Self in the Political Argument of Republicanism, Liberalism and Postmodernism (1993)
- Doctoral advisor: John Charvet

Academic work
- Discipline: Political philosophy; Political theory; History of political thought; Moral philosophy
- Institutions: University of Sydney; University of Toronto; University of York; Australian National University; Princeton University; University of Oxford
- Website: research.manchester.ac.uk/en/persons/duncan-ivison

Duncan Mackenzie Ivison FRSN FAHA (born 1965) is a Professor of Political Philosophy, Vice Chancellor (VC) and President of the University of Manchester. He has served as VC since August 2024 when he succeeded Nancy Rothwell and formerly served as Deputy Vice Chancellor at the University of Sydney and head of the School of Humanities.

== Education and early life ==
Ivison completed his Bachelor of Arts degree in political science and philosophy at McGill University, in Montreal, where he also grew up. He continued his studies with a Master of Science and PhD at the London School of Economics (LSE), the latter of which was supervised by John Charvet and awarded in 1993.

== Career and research ==
Ivison is a political philosopher with interests in political theory, the history of political thought and moral philosophy. His publications include work on postcolonialism, liberalism and indigenous rights.

Previously, Ivison held appointments at the University of Toronto, University of York and was a postdoctoral fellow at Australian National University (ANU).

=== Awards and honours ===
Ivison is a Fellow of the Royal Society of New South Wales (FRSN) and the Australian Academy of the Humanities (FAHA).

Ivison was Laurance Rockefeller visiting fellow at the Centre for Human Values at Princeton University from 2002 to 2003, as well as Visiting Professor at the Australian National University (ANU) in 2023 and Nuffield College, Oxford in 2023.

== Personal life ==
Ivison and his partner, Diana Irving, have two children, Hamish and Isobel.
