= Roualle =

Mountain in Savoie, France

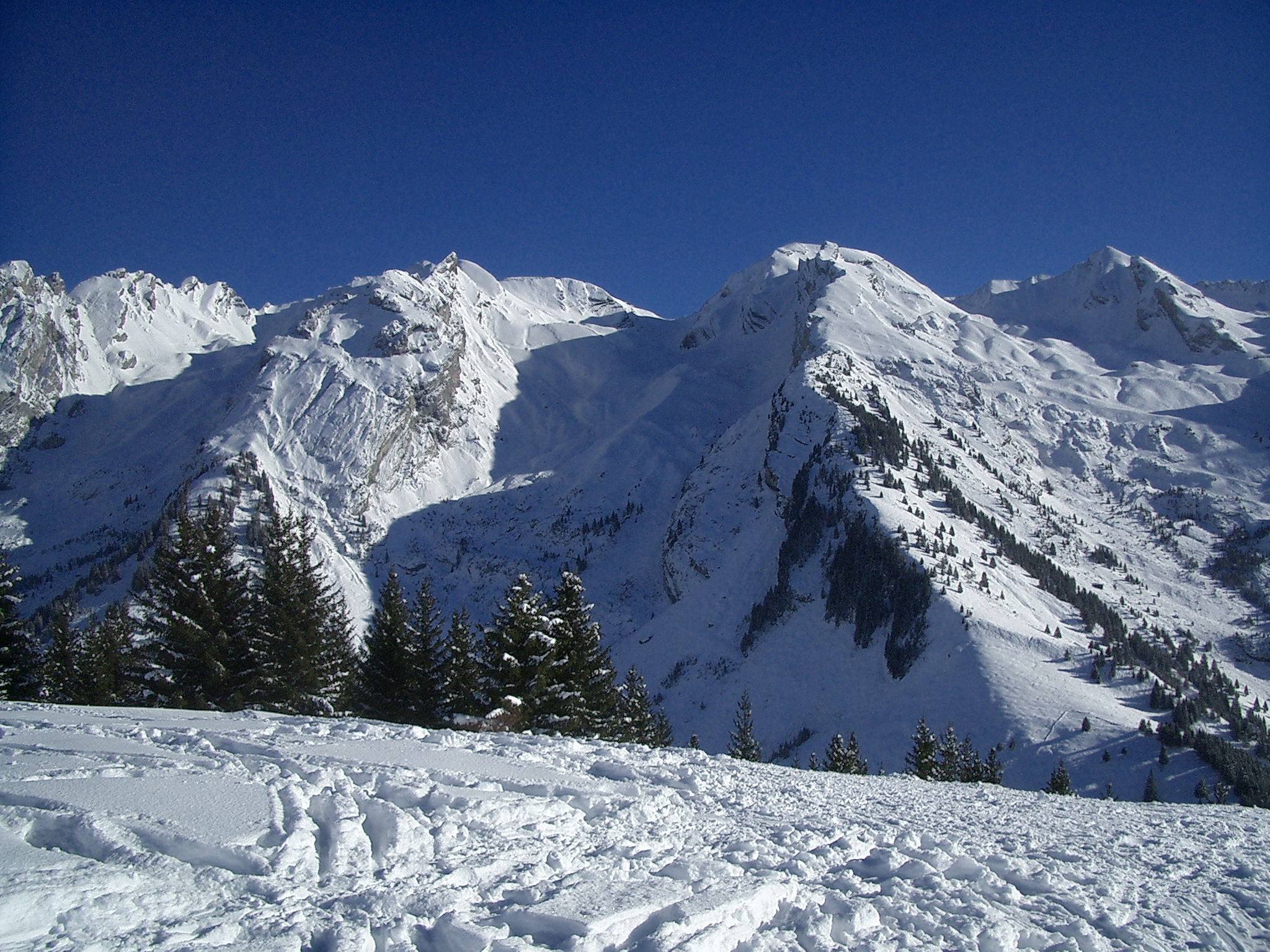

Highest point
- Elevation: 2,589 m (8,494 ft)
- Coordinates: 45°54′03″N 06°30′10″E

Geography
- Location within France
- Location: Savoie, France
- Parent range: Aravis Range

Roualle is a mountain of Savoie, France. It lies in the Aravis Range and has an elevation of 2,589 metres above sea level.
