= Grande Balmaz =

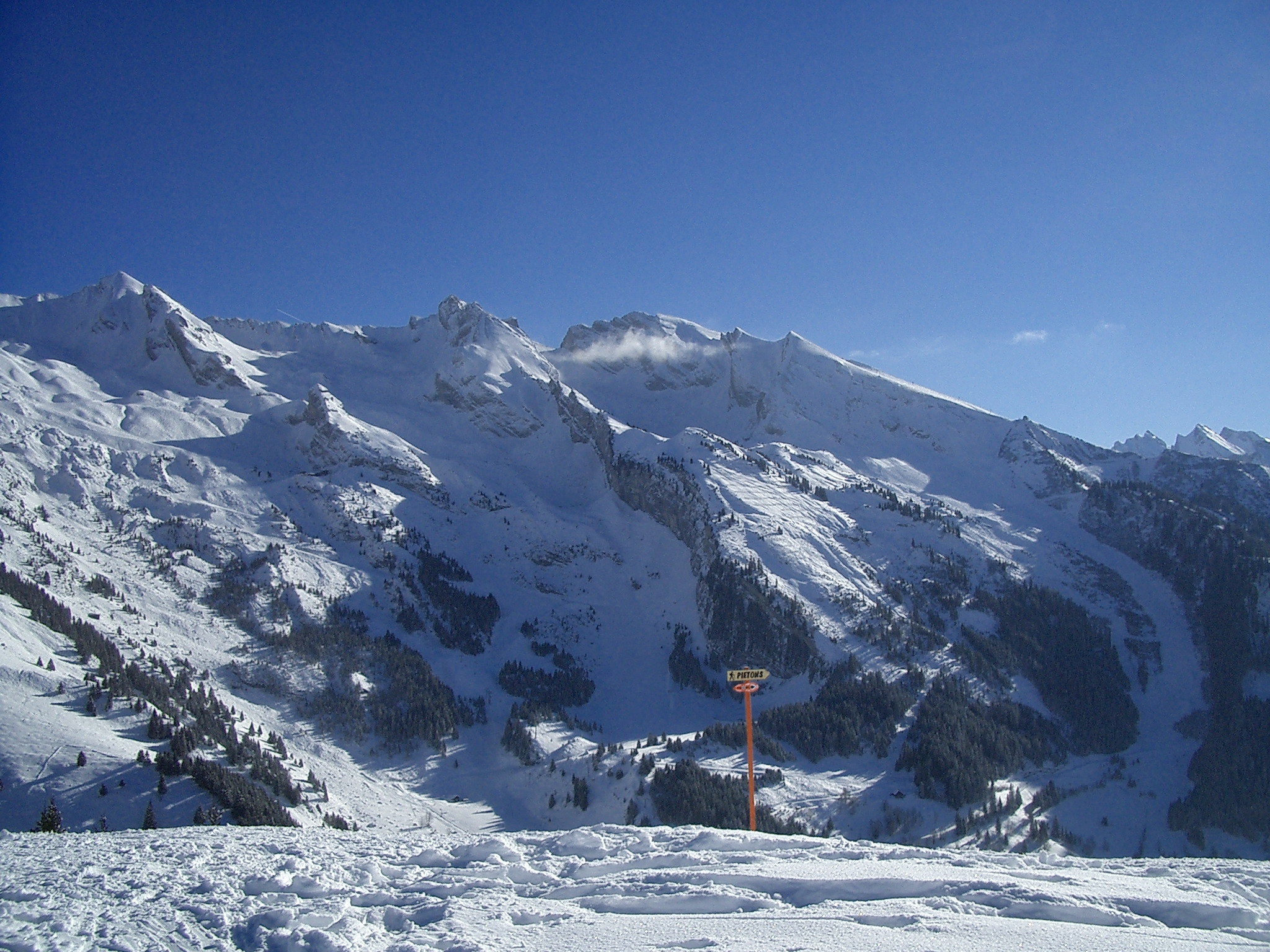
- Grande Balmaz is on the left

Highest point
- Elevation: 2,616 m (8,583 ft)
- Prominence: 305 m (1,001 ft)
- Isolation: 8.4 km (5.2 mi)
- Listing: Alpine mountains 2500-2999 m
- Coordinates: 45°53′35″N 06°29′47″E

Geography
- Location within France
- Location: Savoie and Haute-Savoie, France
- Parent range: Aravis Range

Grande Balmaz is a mountain of Savoie and Haute-Savoie, France. It lies in the Aravis Range and has an elevation of 2,616 metres above sea level.
