= Étale group scheme =

In mathematics, more precisely in algebra, an étale group scheme is a certain kind of group scheme.

== Definition ==
A finite group scheme $G$ over a field $K$ is called an étale group scheme if it is represented by an étale K-algebra $\mathfrak{R}$, i.e. if $\mathfrak{R}\otimes _{K}\bar{K}$ is isomorphic to $\bar{K}\times ...\times\bar{K}$.
