= Anne-Marie Charvet =

French prefect (born 1947)

- Born: 20 March 1947; Marseille, Bouches-du-Rhône, Provence-Alpes-Côte-d'Azur
- Occupation: French prefect

Anne-Marie Charvet (French: [an maʁi ʃaʁvɛ]; born 1947) is a French civil servant (prefect).

She is born on 20 March 1947 in Marseille, Bouches-du-Rhône, Provence-Alpes-Côte-d'Azur.

== Career ==
- 1970-1972 : maître assistant (teacher) in Institut de management public et de gouvernance territoriale in Aix-en-Provence
- 2004-2005 : prefect (préfète) of Tarn-et-Garonne in Montauban
- 2009-2012 : prefect (préfète) of Aude (the first woman prefect or préfète of this department) in Carcassonne

== Honours and awards ==
- France:
  - Chevalier (Knight) of Légion d’honneur

== Sources, Notes, References ==
Anne-Marie Charvet French Prefect Born: 1947
Political offices
Preceded by Jean Paraf	Prefect of Tarn-et-Garonne; 2004 – 2005	Succeeded by Alain Rigolet
Preceded by Bernard Lemaire (prefect)	Prefect of Aude; 2009 – 2012	Succeeded by Éric Freysselinard
