= John Charvet =

British philosopher

- Born: 1938; Cairo
- Died: 2024 (aged 85–86); London

Education
- Education: Winchester College
- Alma mater: University of Cambridge

Philosophical work
- Era: 21st-century philosophy
- Region: Western philosophy
- Institutions: London School of Economics
- Doctoral students: Duncan Ivison
- Main interests: political theory, contractarianism, international relations

John Charvet (1938-2024) was a British political theorist, and Emeritus Professor at the London School of Economics. His interests were in political theory, contractarianism and international relations. He wrote several books including The Nature and Limits of Human Equality and The Liberal Project and Human Rights: The Theory and Practice of a New World Order.

== Education ==
Charvet was privately educated at Winchester College, he read economics at the University of Cambridge where he was an undergraduate student of Corpus Christi College, Cambridge. He was awarded an upper second class degree in 1960. He was subsequently awarded a Bachelor of Philosophy (BPhil) in Politics at Trinity College, Oxford in 1962.

== Career and research ==
Charvet was appointed Lecturer at the London School of Economics (LSE) in 1965, and Reader in 1980. His former doctoral students include Duncan Ivison.

=== Books ===
- The Social Problem in the Philosophy of Jean-Jacques Rousseau
- A Critique of Freedom and Equality
- Feminism
- The Idea of an Ethical Community
- The Liberal Project and Human Rights: The Theory and Practice of a New World Order
- The Nature and Limits of Human Equality

== Personal life ==
Charvet died in March 2024 and his ashes were interred in a family grave in Highgate Cemetery.
