= Étale (mountain) =

Mountain in France

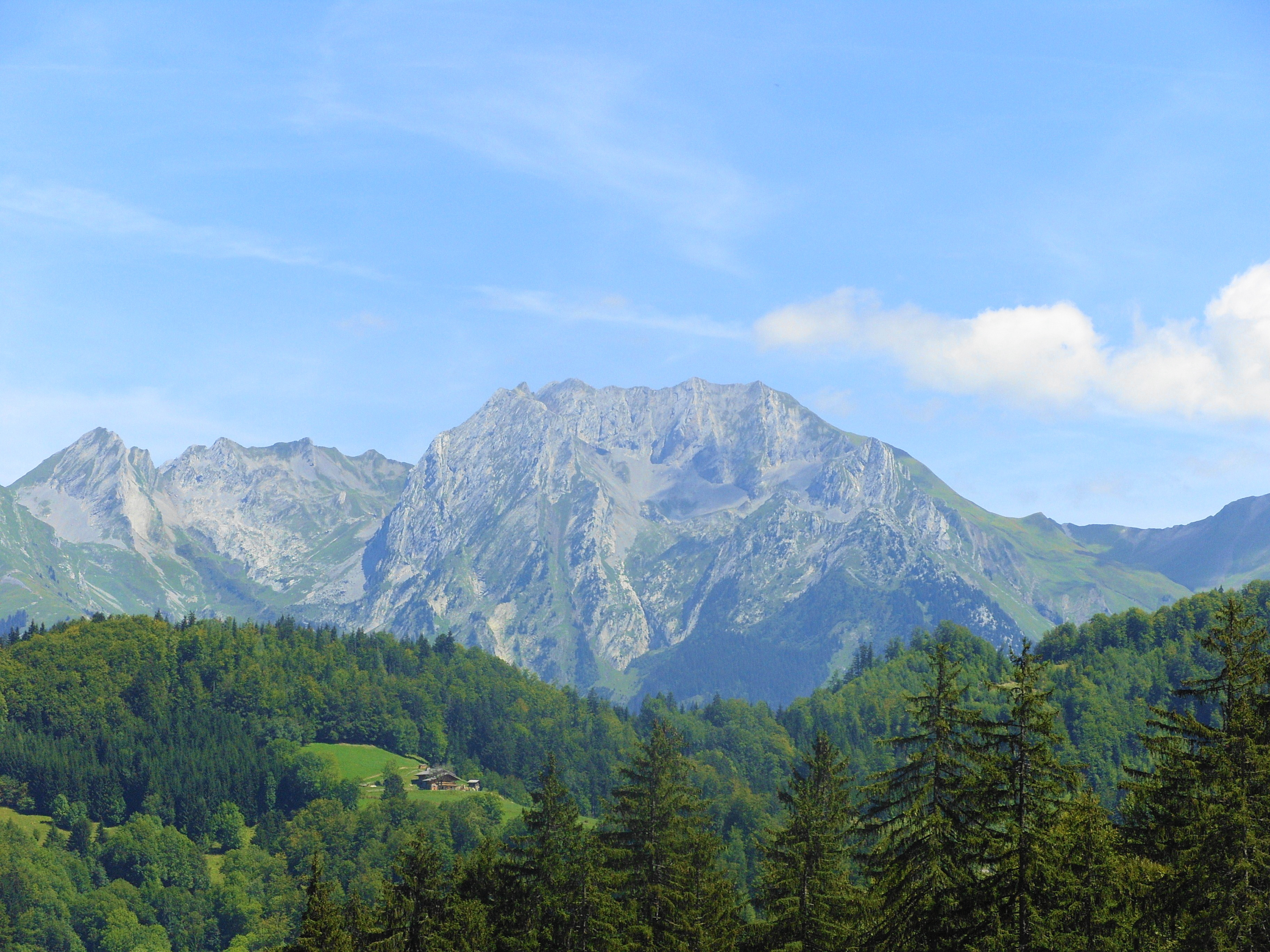
- The Étale

Highest point
- Elevation: 2,484 m (8,150 ft)
- Prominence: 997 m (3,271 ft)
- Coordinates: 45°51′00″N 06°26′51″E

Geography
- Location within Alps
- Location: Savoie, France
- Parent range: Aravis Range

Étale is a mountain of Savoie and Haute-Savoie, France. It lies in the Aravis Range of the French Prealps and has an elevation of 2,484 metres above sea level.
