= Mont Charvet =

Mountain in France

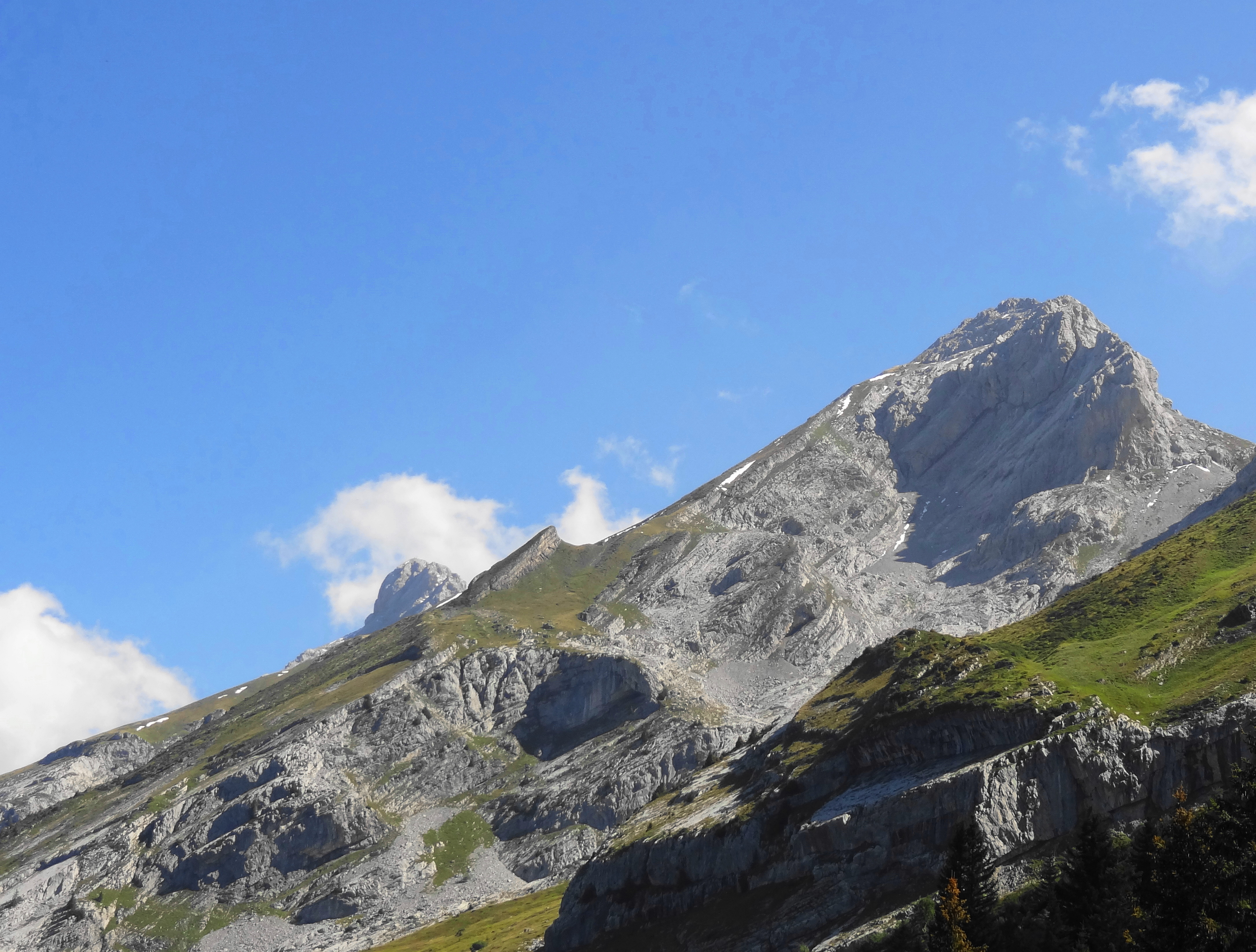
- Mont Charvet

Highest point
- Elevation: 2,538 m (8,327 ft)
- Coordinates: 45°56′32″N 06°32′19″E

Geography
- Location within France
- Location: Haute-Savoie, France
- Parent range: Aravis Range

The Mont Charvet (French: [ʃaʁvɛ]; 2,538 m) is a mountain in the Aravis Range in Savoie, France.
