= Pointe Percée =

Mountain in France

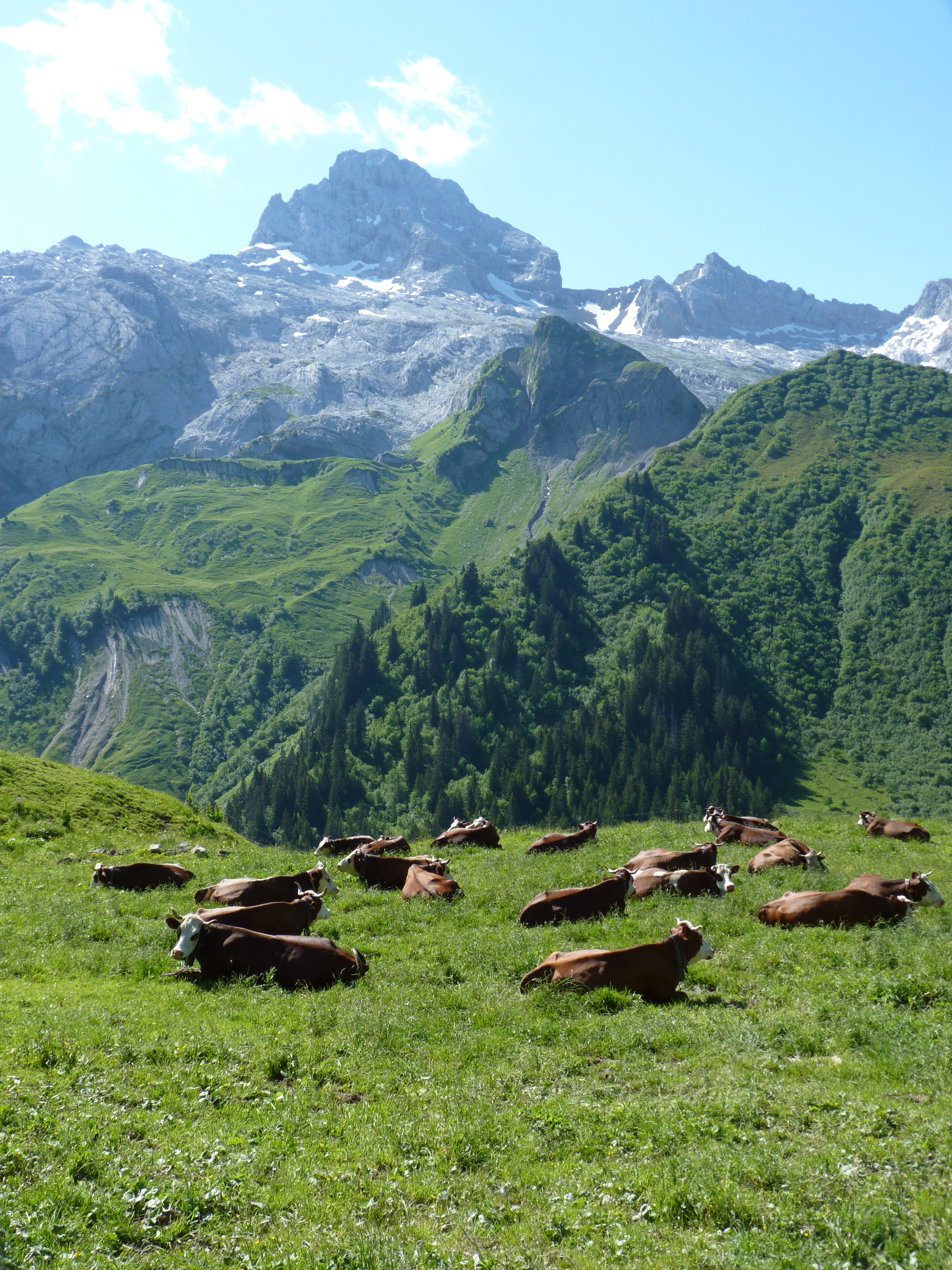
- Pointe Percée

Highest point
- Elevation: 2,753 m (9,032 ft)
- Prominence: 1,643 m (5,390 ft)
- Isolation: 17.66 km (10.97 mi)
- Listing: Ultra
- Coordinates: 45°57′20″N 06°33′22″E

Geography
- Location within Alps
- Location: Haute-Savoie, Rhône-Alpes, France
- Parent range: Aravis Range

Climbing
- First ascent: 1865 by M. L. Maquelin (first documented)

The Pointe Percée (English: "pierced point") is the highest mountain in the Aravis range of the French Prealps of Haute-Savoie. It rises to an elevation of 2,753 metres and has 1,643 metres of topographic prominence, and is thus is classified as an ultra-prominent peak. Its first documented climb was by M. L. Maquelin of Geneva in 1865, though it was likely climbed much earlier.

== See also ==
- List of Alpine peaks by prominence
