= Oëx =

Coordinates: 45°59′00″N 006°38′00″E

Oëx is a village in the Rhône-Alpes region of France, below Pointe d'Areu in the Arve valley. It is part of the commune Magland in Haute-Savoie department.
