= Candide Thovex =

French skier (born 1982)

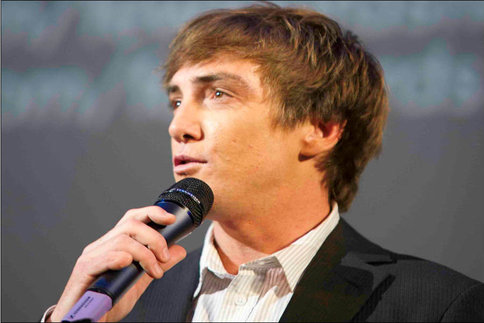
- Thovex at the 2012 premier of Few Words, Paris, France
- Born: 22 May 1982; Annecy, Haute-Savoie, France
- Occupations: Skier, filmmaker, entrepreneur
- Website: www.candideskis.co

Candide Thovex (born 22 May 1982) is a French professional skier, filmmaker and entrepreneur.

He is the older brother of snowboarder Mirabelle Thovex.

== Youth ==
Candide Thovex was born in Annecy, in the Haute-Savoie area of France, and grew up in the village of La Clusaz.

He learned to ski at the age of 2 in the Aravis region of the French Alps. He was 14 when he won his first French National Junior Championships in the mogul division.

== Skiing career ==
=== Freestyle career ===
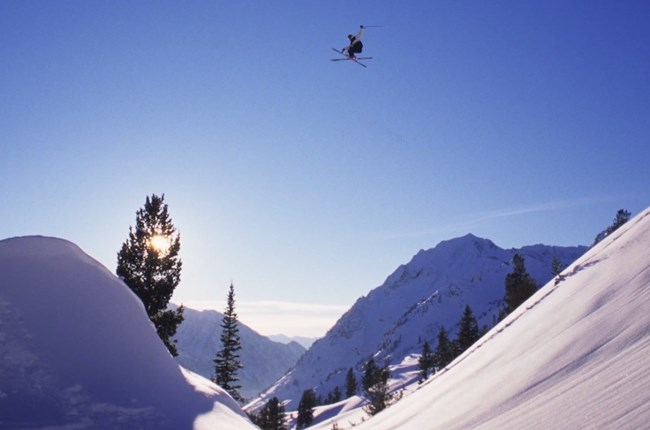
16 year old Candide Thovex completing a jump over "Chad's gap", in Alta, Utah.

==== Early years ====
In 1997 Thovex signed his first professional sponsorship contract with leading Australian action sports brand Quiksilver.

In 2000 Thovex returned to the United States to compete in the Gravity Games in Mammoth, California, where he won the Big Air contest. He made his second visit to Chad's Gap and cleanly landed a D-spin 720 the first major rotation over a gap.

He won the Big Air division, his first gold medal at a Winter X-Games in Mount Snow Vermont. His season ended when he blew out the cruciate ligaments in his left knee.

In the spring of 2001, Thovex was invited to ride at Superpark 3 in Mammoth, California. Thovex stuck a 110-foot (33.5 meter) cork 540 tail grab. Thovex won the Halfpipe and Big Air contests at that year's X Games in Australia. His injury from the previous season allowed time to begin career as a filmmaker, and he created 'WW Prod'. That same year his first production company went on to release the first of 8 films under the 'Rastafaride' title. He was also voted 'Skier of the Year' by the European specialized media.

In 2002 Thovex filmed with his own production company and with others. He continued competing and his contest results remained solid, dominating the Big Air events, winning two in New Zealand, one in Lebanon and another in Switzerland. He earned 2 podiums at the US Open; 2nd place in Superpipe, and 3rd place in Slopestyle.

==== Pushing boundaries ====
In 2003, according to the Association of Freeskiing Professionals, "Candide Thovex and CR Johnson change the face of halfpipe skiing at Winter X Games in Aspen, Colorado by going bigger than any of the snowboarders." Thovex won his second X-Games gold medal. This time it was in Superpipe, a notable achievement, as he couldn't practice at home because there weren't any superpipes in Europe at the time. Thovex celebrated by hosting the first 'Candide Invitational' at his home resort, La Clusaz. The event gathered the world's best freestylers. He also signed a sponsorship deal to develop a pro model with Salomon. This was another season that ended with injury to his cruciate ligaments, this time in his right knee.

In 2004, Thovex performed the first ever '810° to rail'. He was part of Powder's Reader Poll in 2004 where he was placed 6th.

In 2005, the Candide Invitational event was voted best European freestyle event by the international specialized press. That same season, Thovex inked a multi-year deal with Rossignol to become the leading ambassador for their 'Scratch' program.

In 2006, Thovex helped to design and build one of the largest quarter-pipes, and set a world record with a jump of 33 feet (about 10 meters) above the coping.

=== The injury and the comeback ===
In 2007, Thovex won his third gold medal at 2007 in Slopestyle, with a record score of 95/100.

=== Freeride World Tour ===
Thovex won the Freeride World Tour in 2010.

== Film-making career ==
The film 'Few Words' was released in 2012. The French cable TV channel Canal+ purchased the rights to the film in France. It won at the Powder Awards for best male performance, best documentary, best cinematography, and the "Full Throttle" award for the most outstanding all around performance of the season.

The third volume of his One of those days series was shown in France. Comparisons were made between Thovex and James Bond. In the specialized ski press, Powder (USA) magazine said, "The third installment of One of Those Days might be the best yet, as Candide Thovex outdoes himself again, setting the bar in ski edit creativity".

=== "Explore Mont Blanc" by Google ===
On 21 January 2016, Google released a video entitled: 'Explore Mont Blanc with Kilian Jornet, Ueli Steck, Candide Thovex, and Google Maps' to promote the Street View of Mont Blanc in Google Maps. In the first 4 months it was viewed over 2.6 million times. Google describes the list of individuals who took part in the project as "legendary adventurers". Thovex's role in the project was to help build a jump on top of the Mont Blanc and then perform tricks off of it. It is a feat that French travel and photo magazine GEO says on their website is "unprecedented". In an interview posted on the website of French lifestyle magazine Paris Match, Thovex said it was "the hardest jump of my life". On its website, the top French ski magazine Skieur called it "another first for Candide Thovex" and described him as a "true ambassador of skiing". On the Powder magazine website the article covering the event called Thovex a "skiing legend".

=== FISE appearance ===
On 5 and 6 March Thovex participated in a promotional event organized by FISE in China. 11 and 12 March 2016 Thovex competed in the 3rd edition of the B&E Invitational in Les Arcs, France. It was his only contest appearance of the year. He won 2 of the 5 categories on offer, taking the prize for the Beatcan Best Line, and was named the E-Adrenaline Public Choice Winner. The edit of Thovex's performance at the event posted on his Facebook page has been viewed over 1.7 million times.

=== Audi Quattro x Candide Thovex ===
==== "quattro" ====
On 8 December 2015, Thovex released an advertorial film for Audi to promote their latest Quattro Q7 model. The video, created, produced and directed by Thovex, featured Thovex skiing and performing tricks on many surfaces including dirt, grass, fallen leaves and asphalt, but no snow. It was viewed over 1 million times on the first day on Thovex's YouTube channel. It was viewed 2.5 million times in the first 3 days and has been viewed over 7.5 million times since being posted to his official YouTube and Facebook accounts. Powder, a reference in the sport of skiing summed it up simply on the website of the magazine: "Candide doesn't need snow".

In October 2016, 'Candide Thovex – quattro' filmed by Simon Favier and directed by Thovex won two prizes at the Top/Com Grands Prix Consumer 2016 awards held at the Congrès de la Communication Consumer (Conference on Consumer Communication) in Paris. The competition rewards the best advertisements and advertising campaigns of the year in France in a variety of categories. The film won the best 'Publicité on Line' (On Line Advertisement) and the Prix Spécial de l'Expression (Special Prize for Expression).

==== "quattro 2: Ski the World" ====
In January 2017 Candide continued his collaboration with Audi with the release of his "Ski the world" edit featuring Audi's Q7. In the edit, Candide skies on the Great Wall of China and Mongolian statues, the jungle and a beach in Jamaica.

=== American media ===
Thovex continues to be very popular in the American ski community, finishing in one of the top 3 places in the 2014, 2015 and 2016 editions of the Powder Magazine Readers Poll.

He has won the Annual Men's Powder Poll four times, three times in a row in 2017, 2018 and 2019 after his win at the inaugural Powder Poll in 2000. (29).

== Candide Invitational ==
Thovex is the organizer of the Candide Invitational in his hometown of La Clusaz, a competition which gathers freestyle skiing and snowboarding's best talents. The event was first held in the Balme area of La Clusaz in 2002, and was last held in 2007.

== Candide Skis ==
In 2023, Candide launched in own ski brand under the name Candide Skis.

Candide skis develops and sells a range of 5 skis, from freeride powder skis to freestyle and all-mountain skis, as well as kids skis.

== Filmography ==
He has appeared in many movies, including the Rastafaride series.

- 13 (1999)
- Balance (2000)
- Further (2000)
- Propaganda (2001)
- Royalty (2001)
- Rastafaride 1 (2001)
- Rastafaride 2 (2002)
- Rastafaride 3: French Toast (2003)
- Rastafaride 4: Special Delivery (2004)
- Rastafaride 5: Pull Up (2005)
- Rastafaride 6: Wha'ppen (2006)
- Rastafaride 7: Seventh Heaven (2007)
- Happy Dayz (2002)
- Focused (2003)

- Strike (2005)
- Tangerine Dream (2005)
- War (2005)
- Anomaly (2006)
- Mind the Gap (2006)
- The Candide Invitational Story (2007)
- Lost and Found (2007)
- Candide Kamera (2009)
- Candide Kamera 2 (2010)
- Few Words – A Candide Thovex Film (2012)
- One of those days (2013)
- One of those days – II (2015)
- One of those days – III (2016)
- THIS IS HOME – A Film by the Faction Collective (2017)
