= Mont Charvin (Aravis) =

Mountain in Savoie, France

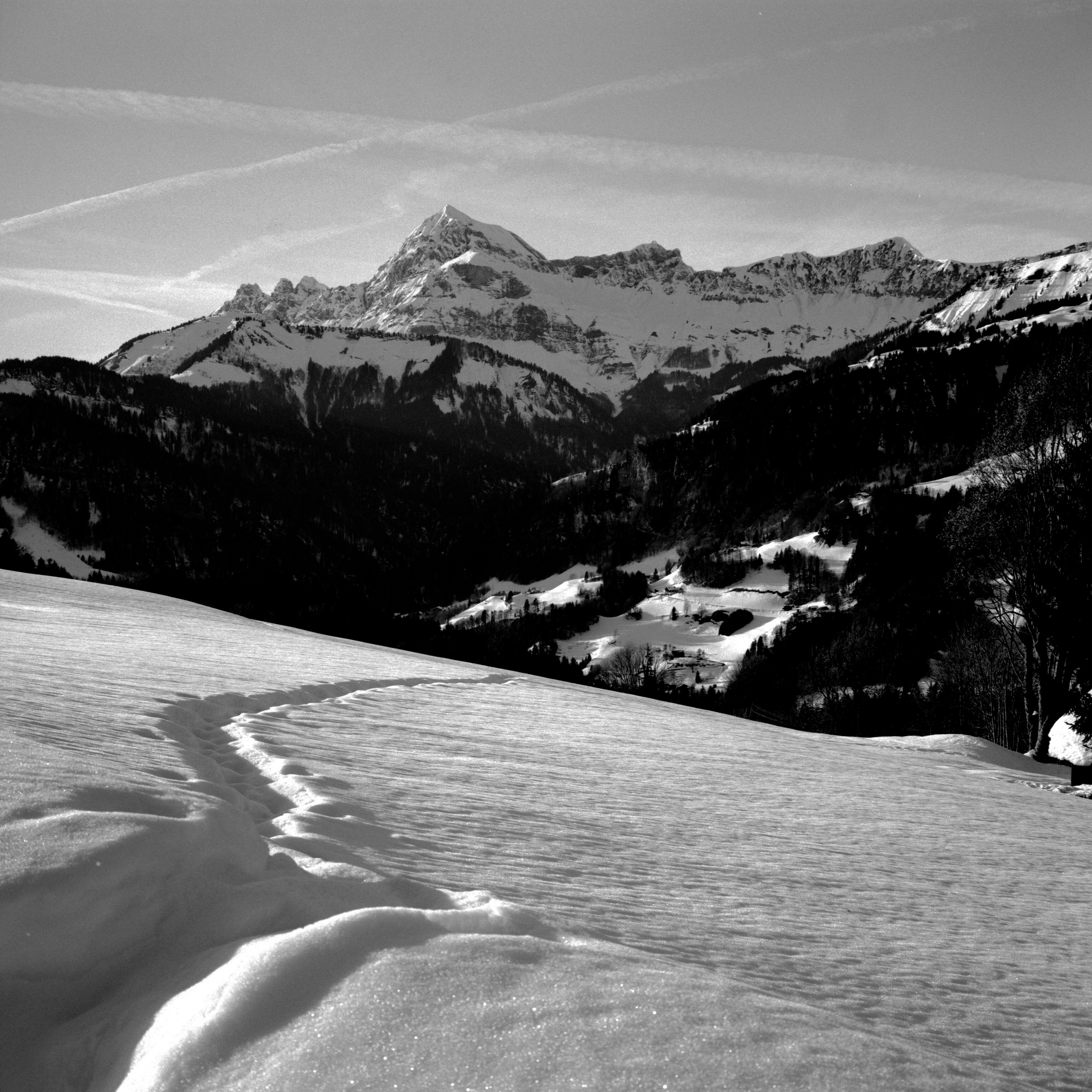

Highest point
- Elevation: 2,409 m (7,904 ft)
- Coordinates: 45°48′09″N 06°25′13″E

Geography
- Location within France
- Location: Savoie, France
- Parent range: Aravis Range

Mount Charvin (French pronunciation: [mɔ̃ ʃaʁvɛ̃]) (2,409 m) is a mountain in the Aravis Range in Savoie, France.
