= Antti Ollila =

Finnish freestyle skier

Personal information
- Nationality: Finnish
- Born: 25 December 1994 (age 30); Rovaniemen maalaiskunta, Finland

Sport
- Sport: Freestyle skiing

Antti Ollila (born 25 December 1994) is a Finnish freestyle skier. He was born in Rovaniemen maalaiskunta. He competed at the 2014 Winter Olympics in Sochi, in slopestyle.
