= Étale algebra =

In commutative algebra, an étale algebra over a field is a special type of algebra, one that is isomorphic to a finite product of finite separable field extensions. An étale algebra is a special sort of commutative separable algebra.

== Definitions ==
Let K be a field. Let L be a commutative unital associative K-algebra. Then L is called an étale K-algebra if any one of the following equivalent conditions holds:

- $L\otimes_{K} E\simeq E^n$ for some field extension E of K and some nonnegative integer n.
- $L\otimes_{K} \overline{K} \simeq \overline{K}^n$ for any algebraic closure $\overline{K}$ of K and some nonnegative integer n.
- L is isomorphic to a finite product of finite separable field extensions of K.
- L is finite-dimensional over K, and the trace form Tr(xy) is nondegenerate.
- The morphism of schemes $\operatorname{Spec} L \to \operatorname{Spec} K$ is an étale morphism.

== Examples ==
The $\mathbb{Q}$-algebra $\mathbb{Q}(i)$ is étale because it is a finite separable field extension.

The $\mathbb{R}$-algebra $\mathbb{R}[x]/(x^2)$ of dual numbers is not étale, since $\mathbb{R}[x]/(x^2)\otimes_\mathbb{R}\mathbb{C} \simeq \mathbb{C}[x]/(x^2)$.

== Properties ==
Let G denote the absolute Galois group of K. Then the category of étale K-algebras is equivalent to the category of finite G-sets with continuous G-action. In particular, étale algebras of dimension n are classified by conjugacy classes of continuous group homomorphisms from G to the symmetric group S_{n}. These globalize to e.g. the definition of étale fundamental groups and categorify to Grothendieck's Galois theory.
