= La Clusaz =

La Clusaz La Klyuza (Arpitan)
- Commune
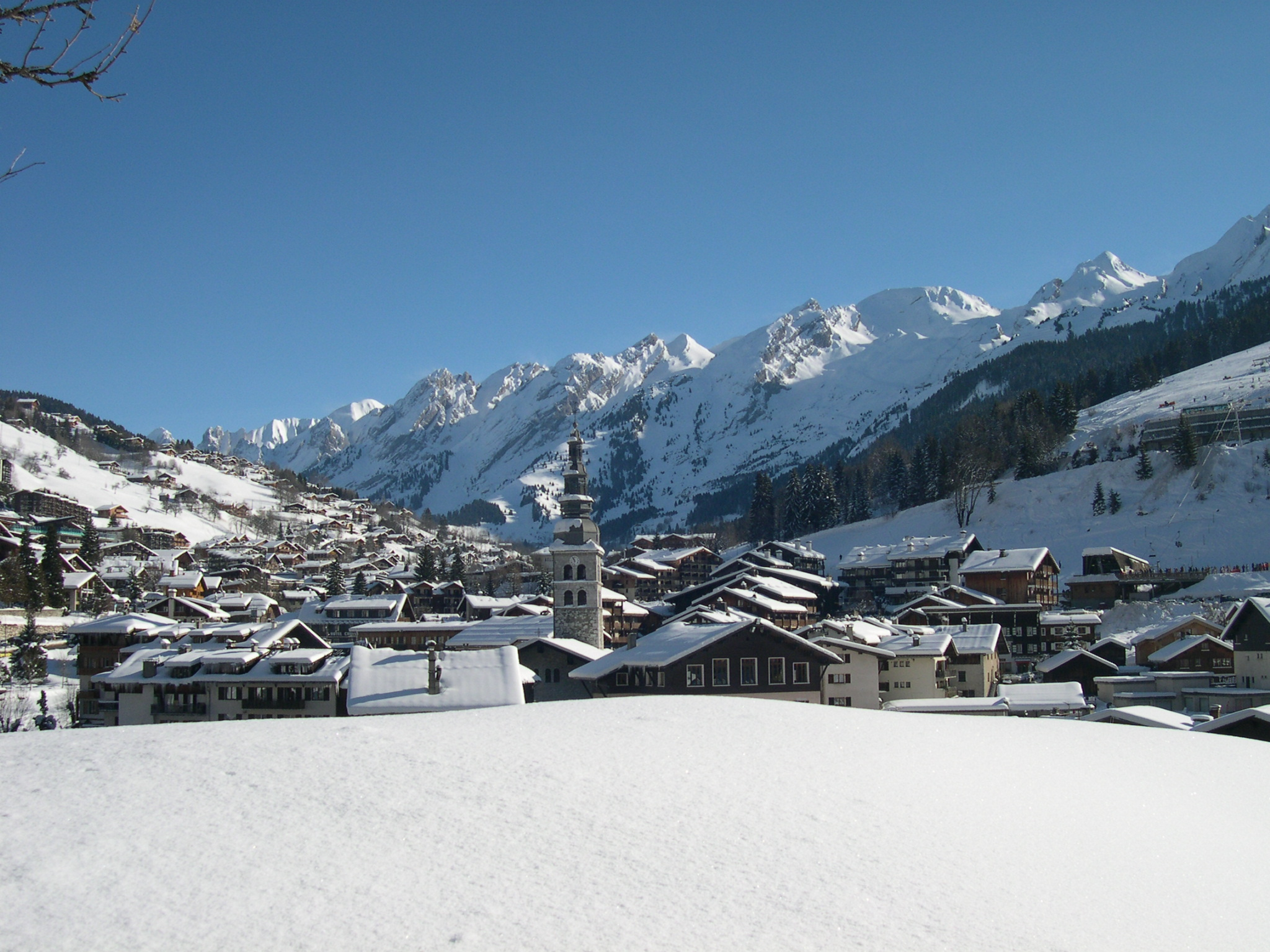
- Panoramic view of La Clusaz in winter

- Coat of arms
- Location of La Clusaz
- Location within France Location within Auvergne-Rhône-Alpes
- Coordinates: 45°54′18″N 6°25′26″E
- Country: France
- Region: Auvergne-Rhône-Alpes
- Department: Haute-Savoie
- Arrondissement: Annecy
- Canton: Faverges
- Intercommunality: CC des Vallées de Thônes

Government
  - Mayor (2020–2026): Didier Thévenet
- Area^{1}: 40.62 km^{2} (15.68 sq mi)
- Highest elevation: 2,616 m (8,583 ft)
- Lowest elevation: 984 m (3,228 ft)
- Population (2023): 1,623
  - Density: 39.96/km^{2} (103.5/sq mi)
- Demonym: Cluses
- Time zone: UTC+01:00 (CET)
  - Summer (DST): UTC+02:00 (CEST)
- INSEE/Postal code: 74080 /74220
- Website: www.laclusaz.org
- ^{1} French Land Register data, which excludes lakes, ponds, glaciers > 1 km^{2} (0.386 sq mi or 247 acres) and river estuaries.

La Clusaz (French pronunciation: [la klyza]; Arpitan: La Klyuza, pronounced [la kʎyza]) is an alpine commune in the Haute-Savoie department in the Auvergne-Rhône-Alpes region in Southeastern France.

== Overview ==
Hosting a ski resort in the French Alps near the Swiss border, the commune is part of the Haute-Savoie alpine department. An old village, La Clusaz has been hosting winter sports since 1907. It is the birthplace of French skiers Guy Périllat, Vincent Vittoz and Candide Thovex . Located in the Aravis Range, La Clusaz (originally from the word cluse, meaning a narrow path between two mountains) was once called Clusa Locus Dei meaning "God's narrow place".

In 1902, the opening of the road connecting Annecy and the Thônes Valley with the Aravis Valley allowed La Clusaz (formerly a small and remote village) to become a tourist centre for summer and winter sports.

In 1956, the first cable car was introduced. The commune of La Clusaz is classified a winter sports resort and of alpinism per decree of 18 June 1969. The first luge was added in 1985, before the first snow cannon in 1994. La Clusaz is part of the Aravis skiing area which it shares with the neighbouring resort of Le Grand-Bornand to offer a total of 220 km (140 mi) of pistes. it will host cross-country skiing for the 2030 Winter Olympics and Para cross-country skiing for the 2030 Winter Paralympics.

== Geography ==
The commune of Clusaz is located 32 km (20 mi) to the east of Annecy, in the Aravis Valley. There are a number of different lakes nearby, the best known of which is the Lac des Confins.

== Toponymy ==
As with many polysyllabic Arpitan toponyms or anthroponyms, the final -x marks oxytonic stress (on the last syllable), whereas the final -z indicates paroxytonic stress (on the penultimate syllable) and should not be pronounced, although in French it is often mispronounced due to hypercorrection.

== Coat of arms ==
Many sheep herds were found in the parish of La Clusaz. The King of Sardinia, the Duke of Savoy, no doubt wished to evoke this pastoral activity, in 1602 gave the village the right to use the arms of “a silver sheep on a green field”.

== Nearby ==
Nearby villages include Manigod, Thônes, Le Grand-Bornand, Saint-Jean-de-Sixt and the larger Chamonix.

== Tourism ==
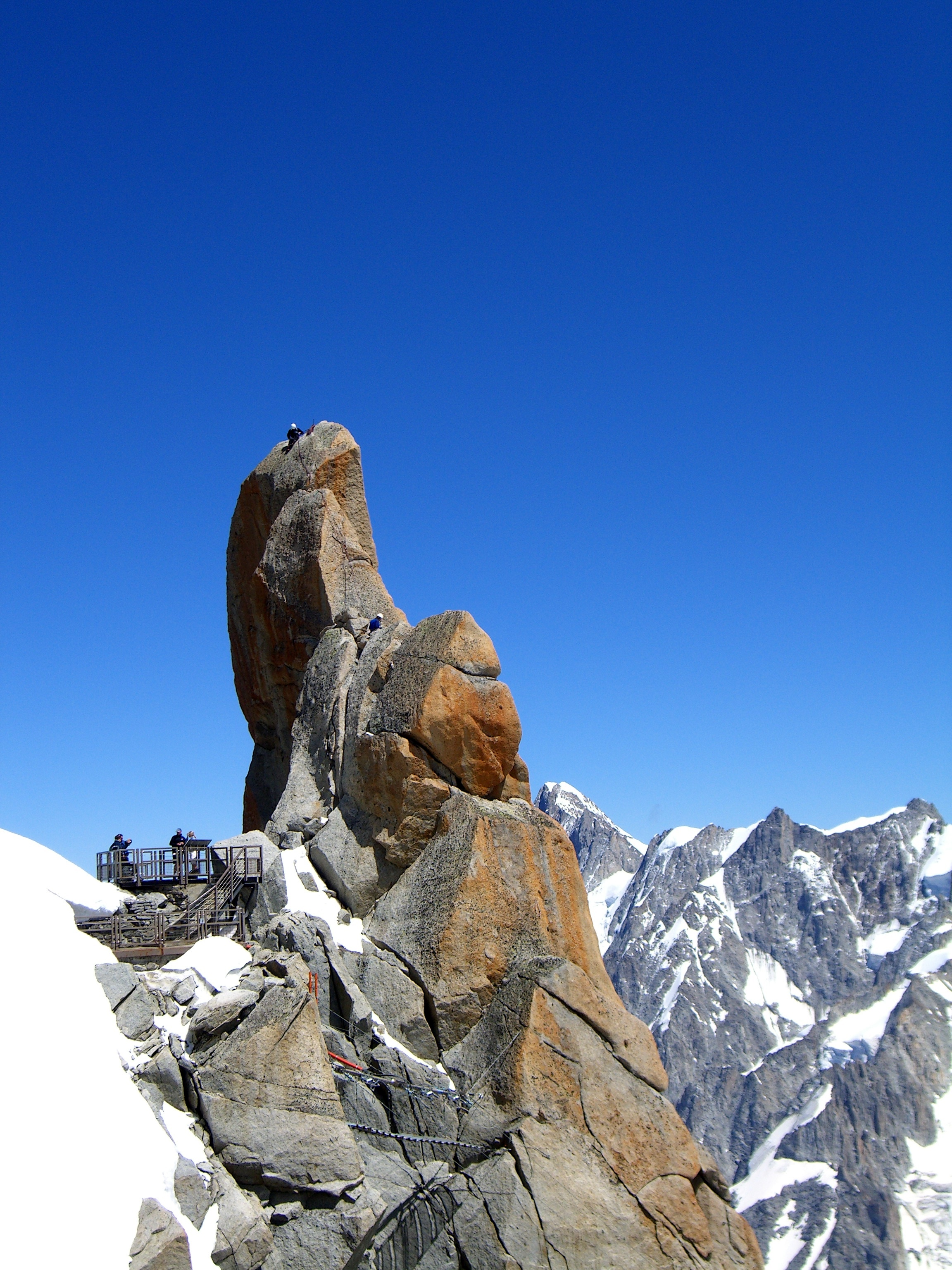
Rock climbing at La Clusaz

La Clusaz's main tourist draw is skiing during the winter season. It has introduced a number of different skiers including:

Candide Thovex, Vincent Vittoz, Mirabelle Thovex, Guy Perillat, Alain Pessey, Sam Phelps, Catherine Lombard, Raphaelle Monod, Edgar Grospiron, Regine Cavagnoud, Loic Collomb-Patton, Laurent Favre william bardsley.

Shopping in La Clusaz is much like other small alpine villages - centred on local shops specialising in either local delicacies such as cheese, meats and wines, or ski shops.

=== Le Tour de France in La Clusaz ===
The Tour de France tends to pass through La Clusaz every few years, often ending in Le Grand Bornand after the tough climb up Col des Aravis. It's not always the case: Stage 9 of the 2010 Tour de France passed through La Clusaz on 13 July.(source) The stage was 204.5 km (127.1 mi) and passed through La Clusaz at 66 km (41 mi) into the race that day. The route started in Morzine. The peloton came through the main part of town on the D909 and continued up to the Col des Aravis, approximately 10 km (6 mi) from town to the summit, climbing approximately 450 m (1,500 ft). The climb from town to the summit of the Aravis is approximately 7 percent. It is a category 2 climb. After the summit, there is a descent into a tunnel and on to the Col des Saisies. The stage ended in Saint Jean de Maurienne.

=== Horse-back riding in La Clusaz ===
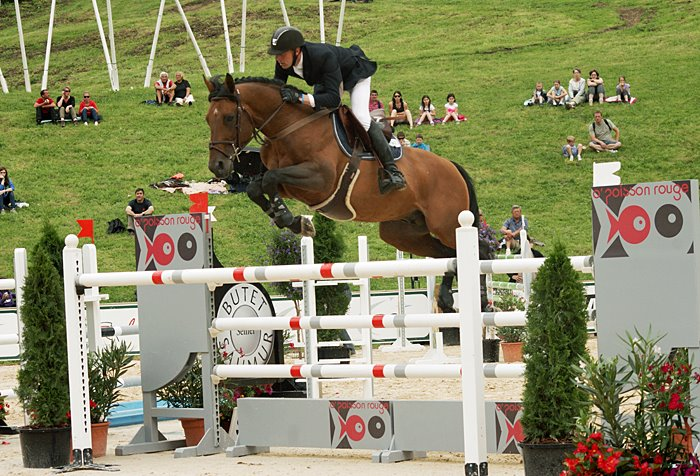
Showjumping at the CSI-3* de La Clusaz

Horse rides are offered in the early morning before starting the day's skiing, or at the end of the day at sunset.

== In popular culture ==
- Webfield/Webber (2017/2021)'La Clusaz' is the title of an English novella and audio-book set in the 1950s in the town and on the surrounding mountains (TOCYPress).

== See also ==
- Communes of the Haute-Savoie department
