= Aravis Range =

Mountain range in France

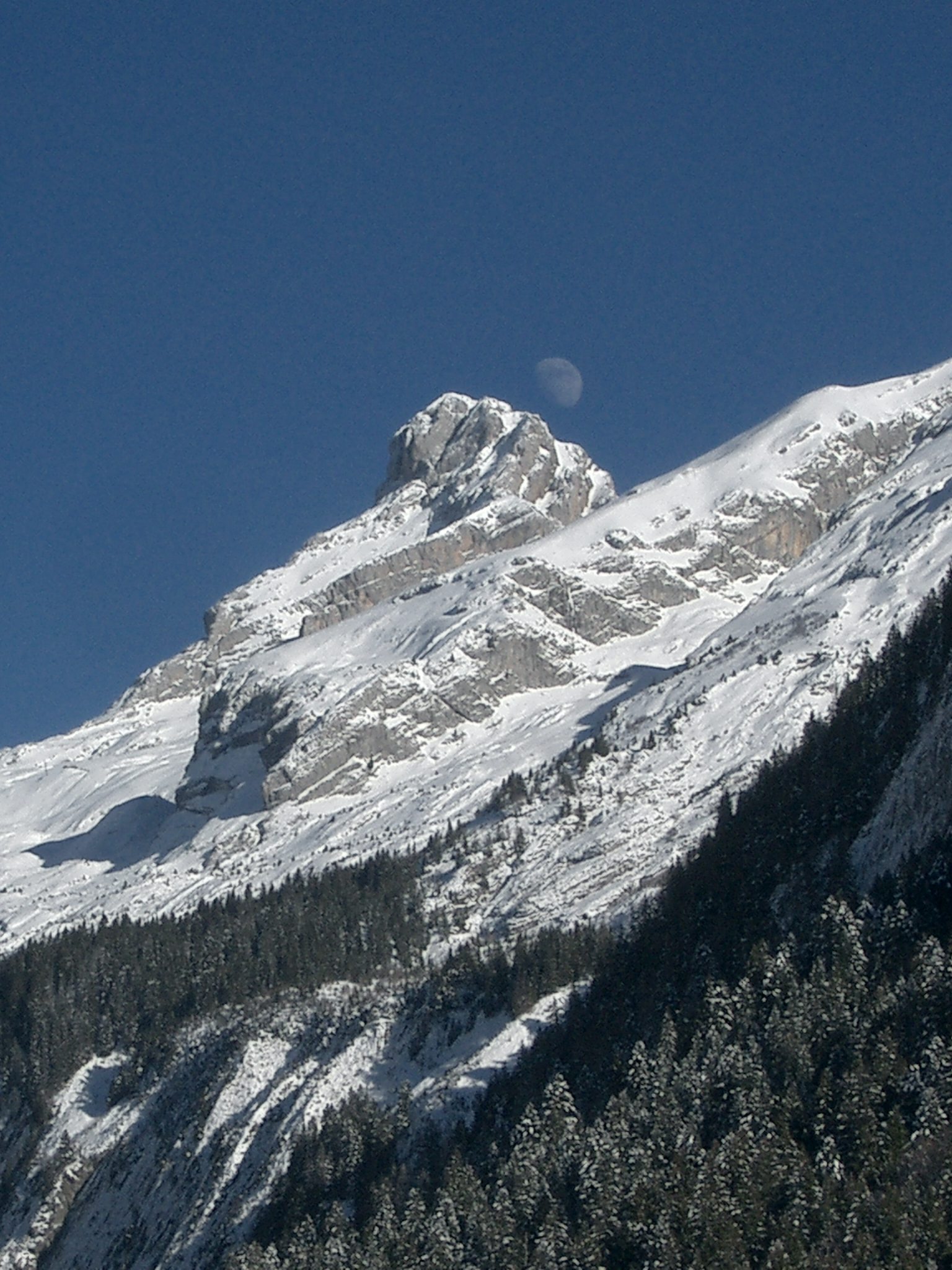
- Pointe Percée

Highest point
- Peak: Pointe Percée
- Elevation: 2,753 m (9,032 ft)
- Coordinates: 45°57′21″N 6°33′20″E

Naming
- Native name: Chaîne des Aravis (French)

Geography
- Country: France
- Department: Savoie; Haute-Savoie
- Parent range: French Prealps
- Borders on: Chablais; Graian Alps

Geology
- Rock type: Sedimentary

The Aravis (French: Chaîne des Aravis) is a mountain range in Savoie and Haute-Savoie, eastern France. It is part of the French Prealps, a lower chain of mountain ranges west of the main chain of the Alps. Its highest summit is the Pointe Percée, at 2753m. The orientation of the Aravis is north-south, and it stretches from Cluses in the north, to Ugine in the south. The Bornes massif, sometimes considered part of the Aravis, lies to its west. The Aravis is separated from the Chablais mountains in the north-east by the Arve river valley, and from the Graian Alps in the south-east by the Arly river valley.

== Peaks ==
- Pointe Percée, 2,753 m (9,032 ft)
- Grande Balmaz, 2,616 m (8,583 ft)
- Roualle, 2,589 m (8,494 ft)
- Parrossaz, 2,556 m (8,386 ft)
- Mont Charvet, 2,538 m (8,327 ft)
- Roche Perfia, 2,499 m (8,199 ft)
- Aiguille de Borderan, 2,489 m (8,166 ft)
- Étale (mountain), 2,484 m (8,150 ft)
- Pointe d'Areu, 2,478 m (8,130 ft)
- Mont Charvin, 2,409 m (7,904 ft)
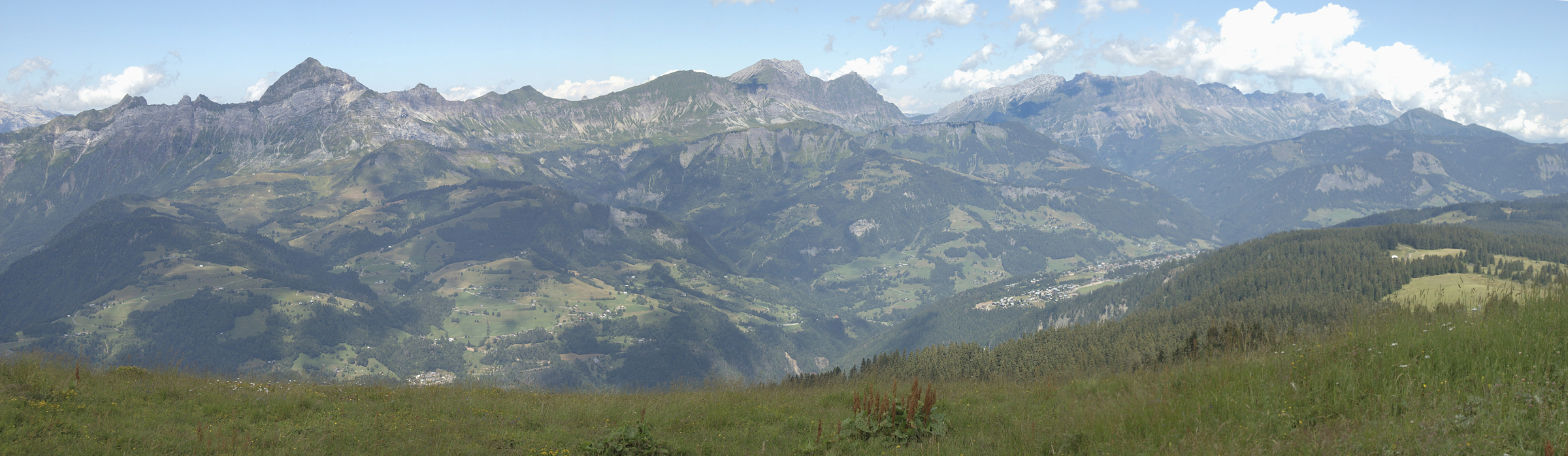
Panorama
