= Thônes =

- Commune
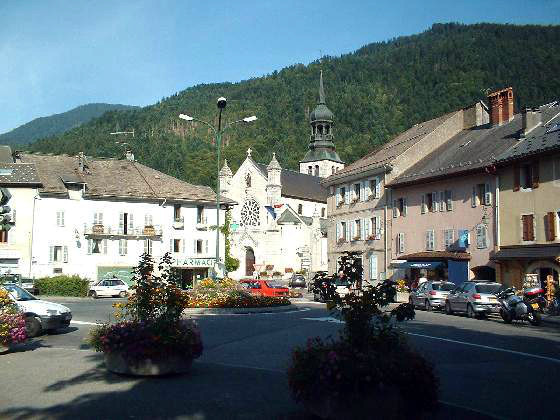
- The centre of Thônes

- Flag Coat of arms
- Location of Thônes
- Location within France Location within Auvergne-Rhône-Alpes
- Coordinates: 45°52′59″N 6°19′33″E
- Country: France
- Region: Auvergne-Rhône-Alpes
- Department: Haute-Savoie
- Arrondissement: Annecy
- Canton: Faverges
- Intercommunality: Vallées de Thônes

Government
  - Mayor (2020–2026): Matthieu Longo-Bozon
- Area^{1}: 52.33 km^{2} (20.20 sq mi)
- Highest elevation: 2,280 m (7,480 ft)
- Lowest elevation: 574 m (1,883 ft)
- Population (2023): 6,654
  - Density: 127.2/km^{2} (329.3/sq mi)
- Time zone: UTC+01:00 (CET)
  - Summer (DST): UTC+02:00 (CEST)
- INSEE/Postal code: 74280 /74230
- Website: Mairie-thones.fr
- ^{1} French Land Register data, which excludes lakes, ponds, glaciers > 1 km^{2} (0.386 sq mi or 247 acres) and river estuaries.

Thônes (French pronunciation: [ton]) is a commune in the Haute-Savoie department in the Auvergne-Rhône-Alpes region in south-eastern France, and is the ″capital″ of local cheeses Reblochon and Chevrotin.

== Geography ==
The Fier flows northwestward through the middle of the commune and traverses the village.

== Population ==
Historical population
Year	Pop.	±% p.a.
1968	3,165	—
1975	3,555	+1.67%
1982	4,169	+2.30%
1990	4,619	+1.29%
1999	5,212	+1.35%
2007	5,777	+1.29%
2012	6,020	+0.83%
2017	6,576	+1.78%
2023	6,654	+0.20%
Source: INSEE

== People ==
- Émile Paganon, Alpine guide and skier
- Marie Suize, Golddigger and entrepreneur

== See also ==
- Communes of the Haute-Savoie department
