= Annecy =

Prefecture of Haute-Savoie, Auvergne-Rhône-Alpes, France

Annecy È(n)neci (Arpitan) Annesì (Italian)
- Prefecture and commune
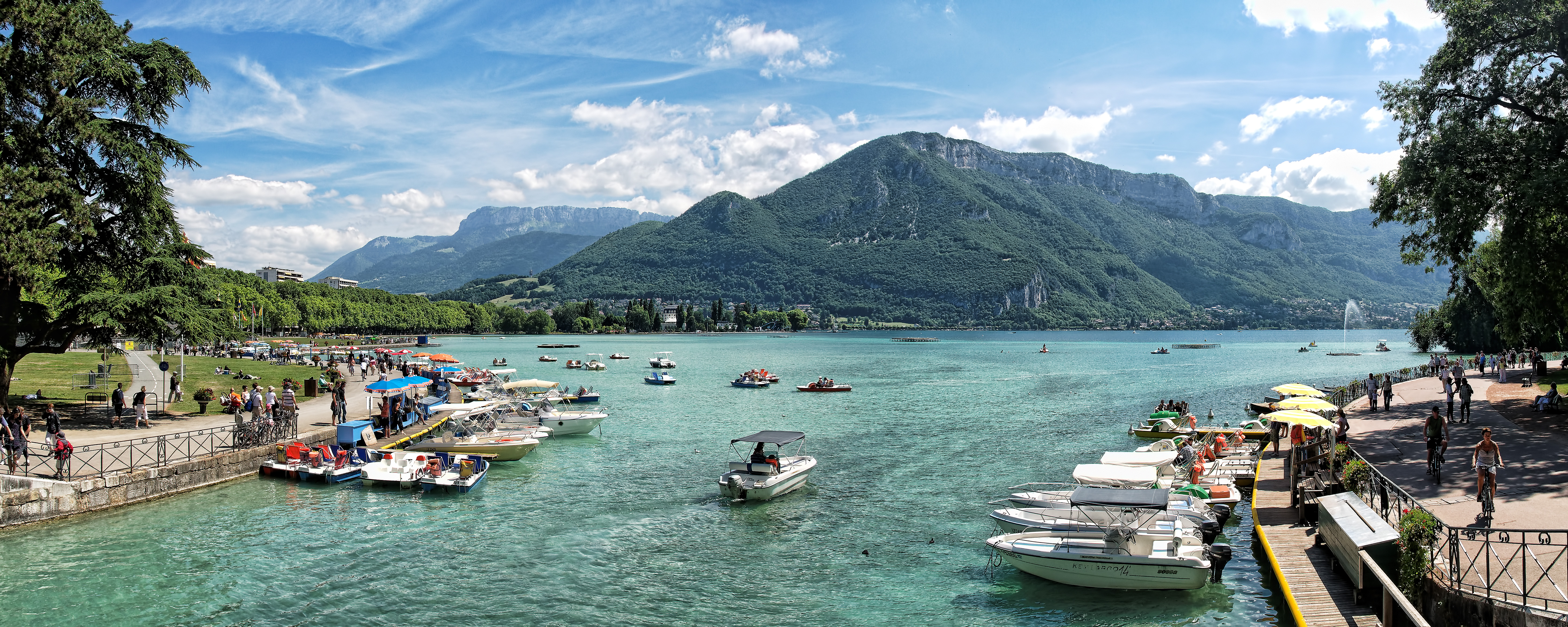
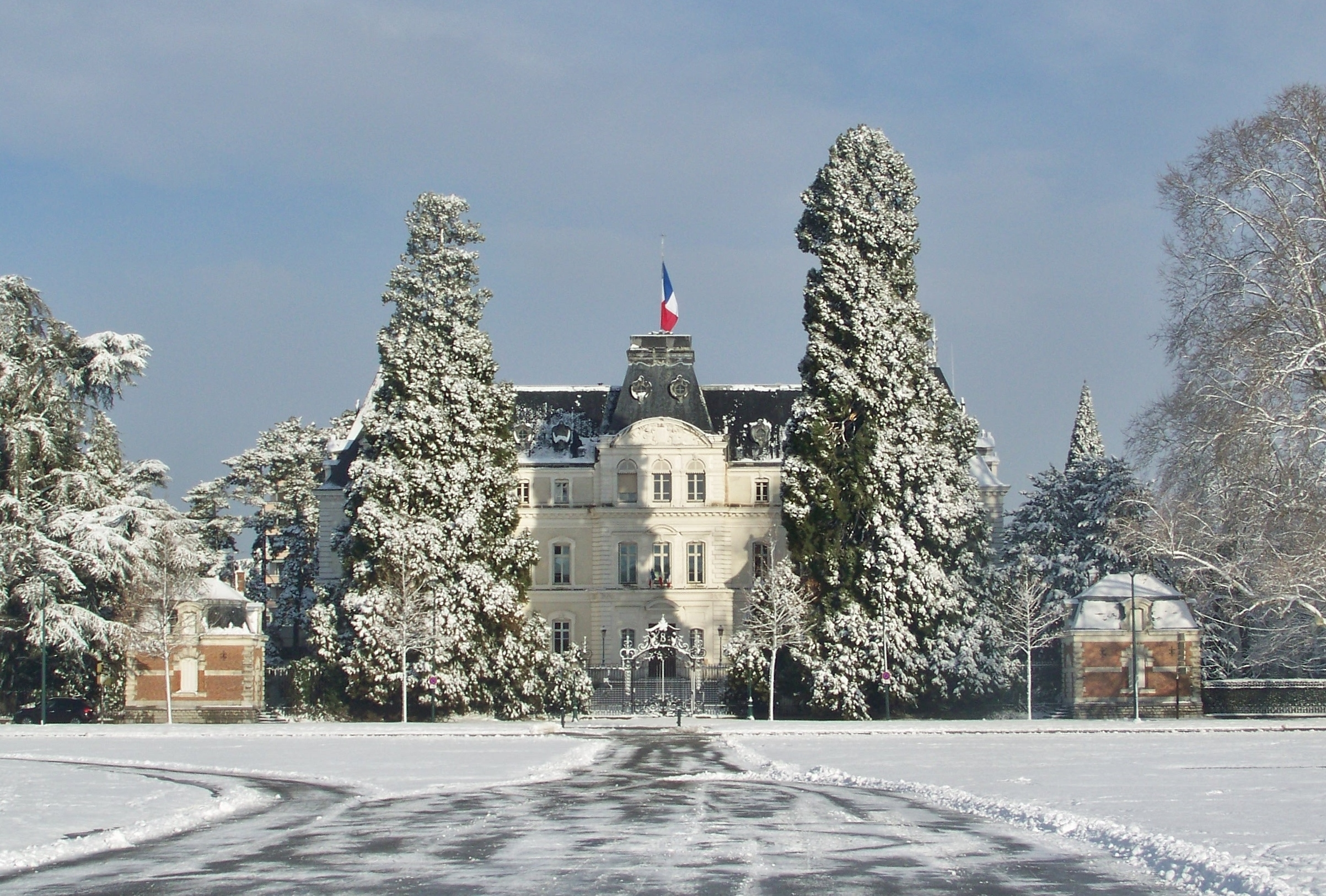
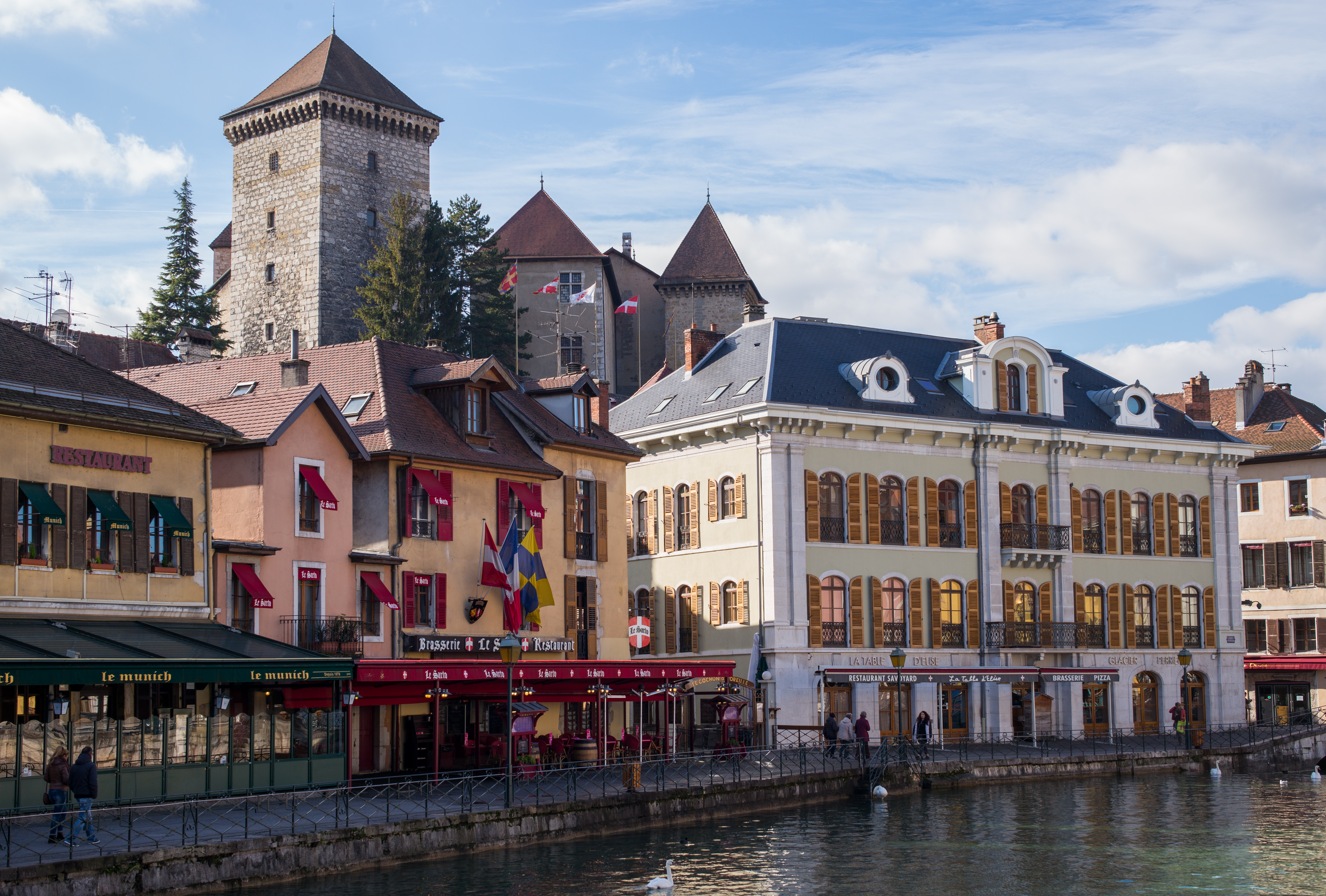
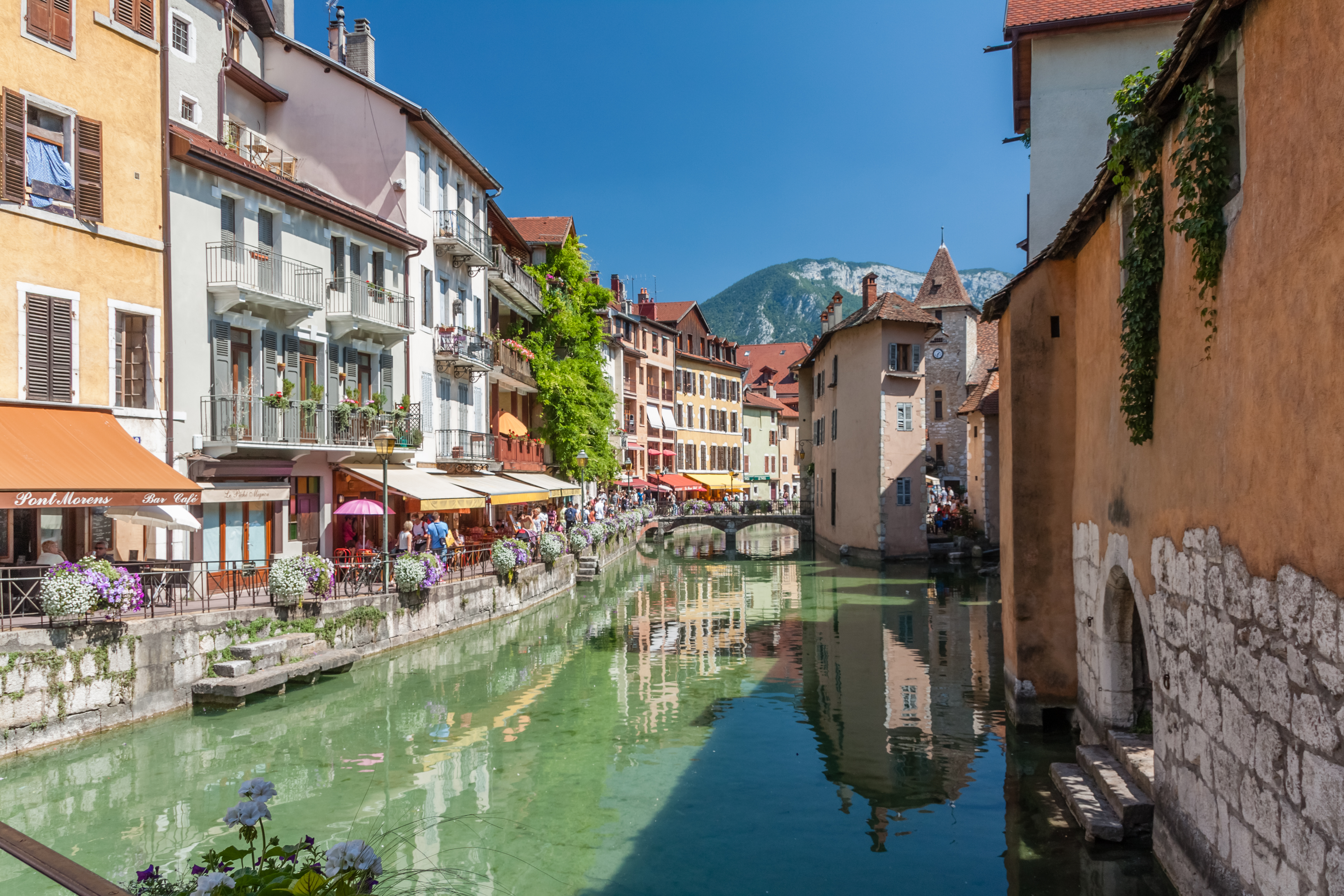
- Clockwise from top: Lake Annecy seen from the Pont des Amours, Château d'Annecy, Passage de l'Île, Haute-Savoie prefecture building

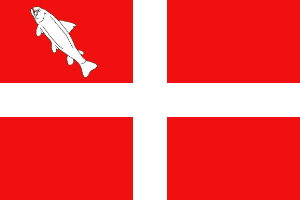
- Flag Coat of arms
- Location of Annecy
- Location within France Location within Auvergne-Rhône-Alpes
- Coordinates: 45°54′58″N 6°07′59″E
- Country: France
- Region: Auvergne-Rhône-Alpes
- Department: Haute-Savoie
- Arrondissement: Annecy
- Canton: Annecy-1, 2, Annecy-3 and 4
- Intercommunality: CA du Grand Annecy

Government
  - Mayor (2026–32): Antoine Armand (RE)
- Area^{1}: 66.94 km^{2} (25.85 sq mi)
  - Urban (2022): 227.0 km^{2} (87.6 sq mi)
  - Metro: 1,199.2 km^{2} (463.0 sq mi)
- Highest elevation: 1,153 m (3,783 ft)
- Lowest elevation: 396 m (1,299 ft)
- Population (2023): 132,117
  - Rank: 29th in France
  - Density: 1,974/km^{2} (5,112/sq mi)
  - Urban (2022): 184,530
  - Urban density: 812.9/km^{2} (2,105/sq mi)
  - Metro (2022): 300,251
  - Metro density: 250.38/km^{2} (648.47/sq mi)
- Demonym(s): Annécien (masculine); Annécienne (feminine)
- Time zone: UTC+01:00 (CET)
  - Summer (DST): UTC+02:00 (CEST)
- INSEE/Postal code: 74010 /74000
- Dialling codes: 0450
- Website: www.annecy.fr
- ^{1} French Land Register data, which excludes lakes, ponds, glaciers > 1 km^{2} (0.386 sq mi or 247 acres) and river estuaries.

Annecy (US: /ˌænəˈsiː, ɑːnˈsiː/ AN-ə-SEE, ahn-SEE; French: [an(ə)si]) is the prefecture and largest city of the Haute-Savoie department in the Auvergne-Rhône-Alpes region of Southeastern France. It lies on the northern tip of Lake Annecy, 35 kilometres (22 mi) south of Geneva, Switzerland.

Nicknamed the "Pearl of the French Alps" in Raoul Blanchard's monograph describing its location between lake and mountains, the town controls the northern entrance to the lake gorge. Due to a lack of available building land between the lake and the protected Semnoz mountain, its population has remained stable, around 50,000 inhabitants, since 1950. However, the 2017 merger with several ex-communes extended the population of the city to 128,199 inhabitants and that of the urban area to 177,622, placing Annecy seventh in the Auvergne-Rhône-Alpes region.

Switching from the counts of Geneva's dwelling in the 13th century, to the counts of Savoy's in the 14th century, the city became Savoy's capital in 1434 during the Genevois-Nemours prerogative until 1659. Its role increased in 1536, during the Calvinist Reformation in Geneva, while the bishop took refuge in Annecy. Saint Francis de Sales gave Annecy its advanced Catholic citadel role known as Counter-Reformation. The annexation of Savoy merged the city to France in 1860.

Sometimes called "Venice of the Alps", this idyllic and touristic representation comes from the three canals and the Thiou river, which passes through the old city. The city experienced an industrial development in the 19th century with silk manufacturing. Some of its industrial legacy remains today with the headquarters of NTN-SNR bearings, Salomon and Dassault Aviation.

From the end of the 20th century, Annecy developed tourism around its lake summer facilities, winter resorts proximity and cultural attraction with its castle renovation and fine art museum opening in 1956 and the Animated Film Festival since 1963, hosted in Bonlieu's cultural centre. The municipal environmental policy managed to keep 40.3% of green spaces, and the city was awarded the "Golden Flower" in 2015, given to the nine most-flowered French cities.

== History ==
=== Early history ===
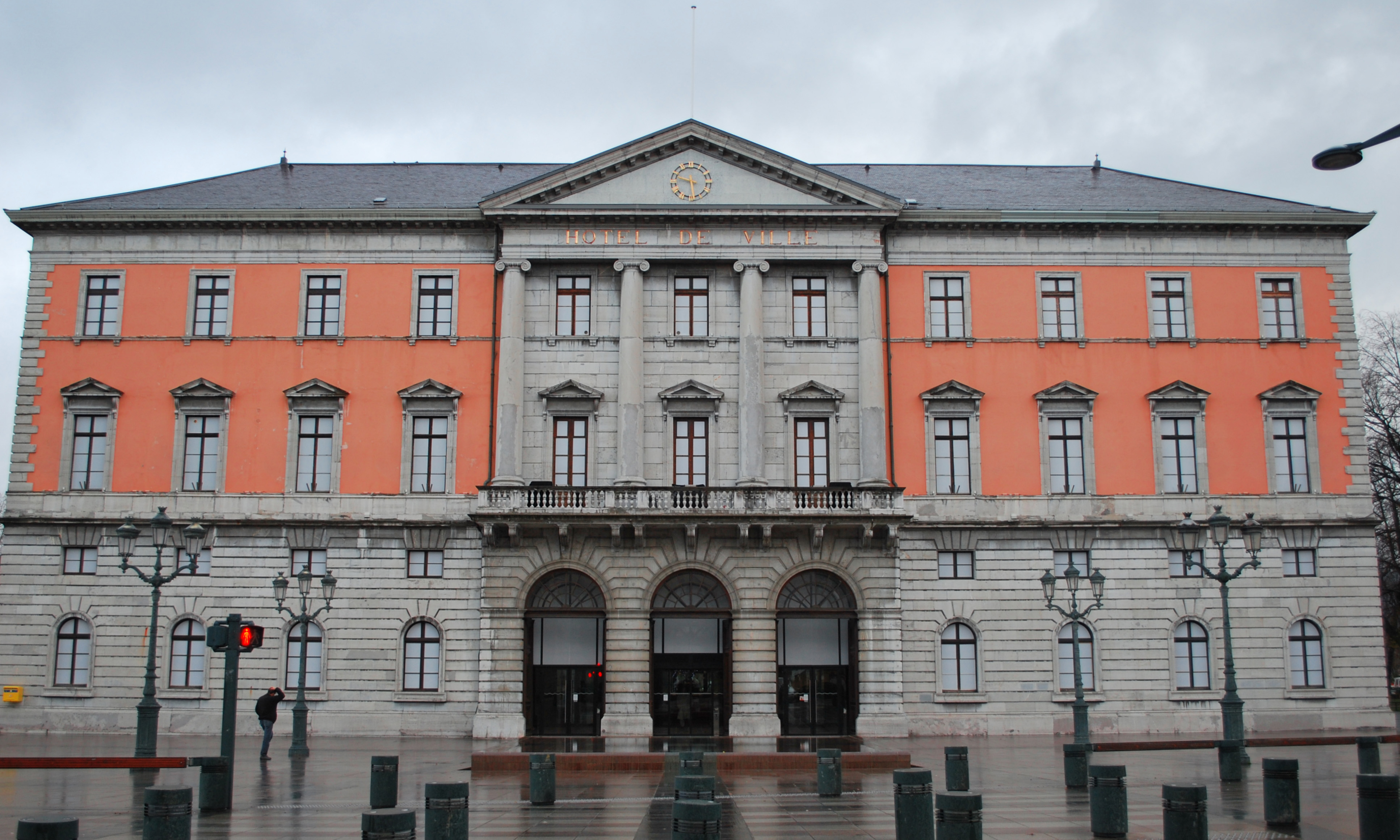
The Hôtel de Ville

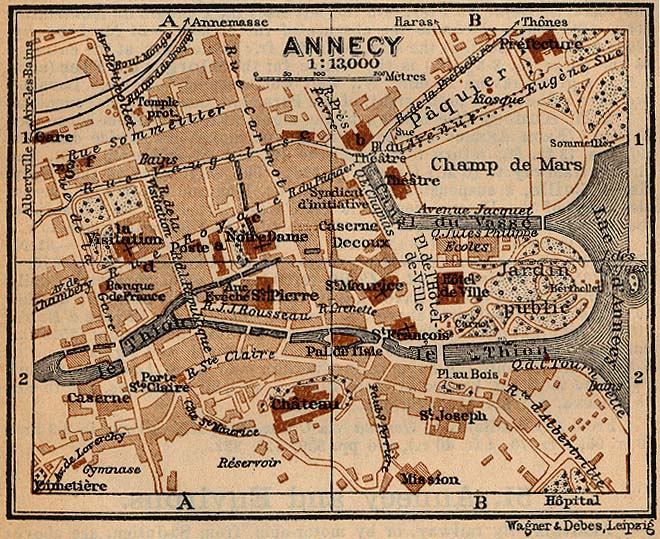
1914 map, French edition

Le vieil Annecy ("Old Annecy"; not to be confused with Annecy-le-Vieux, formerly a neighboring town but now merged into Annecy), was a settlement from the time of the Romans. Annecy was the court of the counts of Geneva or Genevois from the 10th century. It passed to the counts of Savoy in 1401. In 1444, it became the regional capital of the provinces of Genevois, Faucigny and Beaufortain.

=== Counter-Reformation ===
With the advance of Calvinism, Annecy became a centre for the Counter-Reformation, the old Bishopric of Geneva being transferred to it in 1535. Francis of Sales was born in Sales, France in 1567 and served as bishop of Annecy from 1602 to 1622; his relics are preserved in the cathedral. During the French Revolution, the Savoy region was conquered by France. Annecy became attached to the department of Mont Blanc, whose capital was Chambéry. The Catholic diocese was suppressed in 1801.

=== 1815–present ===
After the Bourbon Restoration in 1815, Annecy was returned to the King of Sardinia and the Catholic diocese restored in 1822. The Hôtel de Ville (city hall) was completed in 1851.

When Savoy was annexed to France in 1860 with the Treaty of Turin, it became the capital of the new department of Haute-Savoie. Annecy was the site of the second round of General Agreement on Tariffs and Trade (GATT) talks in 1949. In 2012, a multiple murder occurred in the Annecy area.

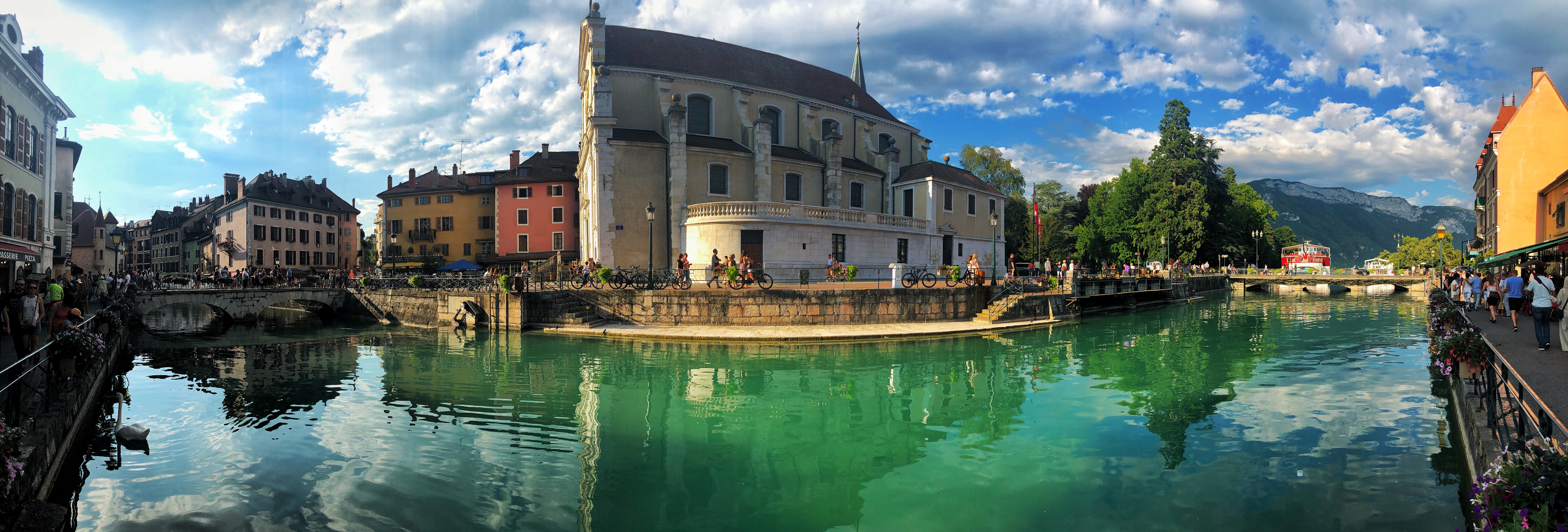
A panoramic image from the southern bank of the Thiou in the city centre as of July 2018

A new municipality was established on 1 January 2017 with the merger of the former communes of Annecy-le-Vieux, Cran-Gevrier, Meythet, Pringy and Seynod.

== Administration ==
Annecy is part of four cantons (Annecy-1, Annecy-2, Annecy-3 and Annecy-4); it is the prefecture of Haute-Savoie.

Since 2017, Annecy has consisted of six delegate cities: Annecy; Annecy-le-Vieux; Cran-Gevrier; Meythet; Pringy; and Seynod. Local government consists of a city council with 202 members. The number of members in each commune delegate depends upon its population. The Mayor is François Astorg (LE) since 2020.

The intercommunality of Annecy, Communauté d'agglomération du Grand Annecy, includes 34 municipalities.

== Geography ==
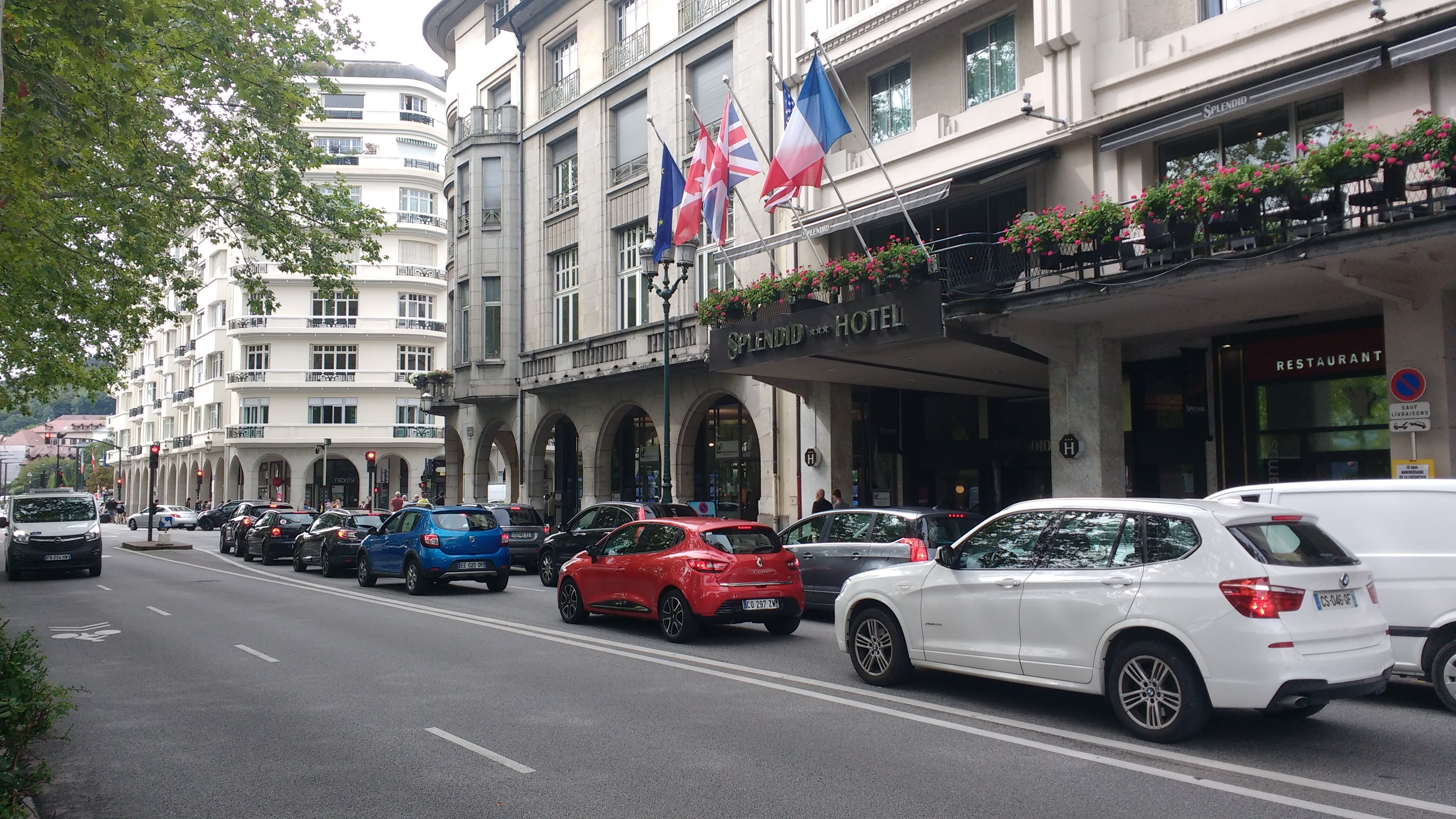
Annecy city centre, 2019

The Fier forms part of the commune's northwestern border. The surrounding mountains are Mont Veyrier, Mont Semnoz, La Tournette and Parmelan.

=== Climate ===
Annecy has an oceanic climate (Köppen: Cfb) despite its relatively far inland position. Influenced by its elevation, summers are rather moderate on average, although they can be highly variable with extreme heat spikes. Winters see occasional freezing temperatures, but temperatures most often stay in the single-digits centigrade during the daytime with frequent cold rain. Air frosts are normal during the night and snowfall is not uncommon.

Climate data for Annecy (Meythet), elevation 455 m (1,493 ft), (1992–2020 normals, extremes 1970–present)
| Month | Jan | Feb | Mar | Apr | May | Jun | Jul | Aug | Sep | Oct | Nov | Dec | Year |
|---|---|---|---|---|---|---|---|---|---|---|---|---|---|
| Record high °C (°F) | 18.7 (65.7) | 20.3 (68.5) | 24.3 (75.7) | 27.7 (81.9) | 32.6 (90.7) | 35.1 (95.2) | 38.0 (100.4) | 38.5 (101.3) | 31.9 (89.4) | 27.5 (81.5) | 22.3 (72.1) | 19.9 (67.8) | 38.5 (101.3) |
| Mean daily maximum °C (°F) | 5.6 (42.1) | 7.6 (45.7) | 12.3 (54.1) | 16.3 (61.3) | 20.3 (68.5) | 24.2 (75.6) | 26.5 (79.7) | 26.1 (79.0) | 21.3 (70.3) | 16.3 (61.3) | 10.0 (50.0) | 6.3 (43.3) | 16.1 (61.0) |
| Daily mean °C (°F) | 2.1 (35.8) | 3.3 (37.9) | 7.0 (44.6) | 10.6 (51.1) | 14.7 (58.5) | 18.5 (65.3) | 20.5 (68.9) | 20.1 (68.2) | 16.0 (60.8) | 11.8 (53.2) | 6.2 (43.2) | 2.8 (37.0) | 11.1 (52.0) |
| Mean daily minimum °C (°F) | −1.4 (29.5) | −1.0 (30.2) | 1.7 (35.1) | 5.0 (41.0) | 9.2 (48.6) | 12.7 (54.9) | 14.4 (57.9) | 14.2 (57.6) | 10.7 (51.3) | 7.2 (45.0) | 2.5 (36.5) | −0.6 (30.9) | 6.2 (43.2) |
| Record low °C (°F) | −23.0 (−9.4) | −15.5 (4.1) | −15.0 (5.0) | −5.0 (23.0) | −2.0 (28.4) | 1.0 (33.8) | 3.0 (37.4) | 4.0 (39.2) | −2.5 (27.5) | −5.0 (23.0) | −11.5 (11.3) | −16.0 (3.2) | −23.0 (−9.4) |
| Average precipitation mm (inches) | 94.2 (3.71) | 78.9 (3.11) | 89.9 (3.54) | 96.1 (3.78) | 109.2 (4.30) | 95.1 (3.74) | 101.1 (3.98) | 106.4 (4.19) | 108.3 (4.26) | 109.8 (4.32) | 109.7 (4.32) | 112.5 (4.43) | 1,211.2 (47.69) |
| Average precipitation days (≥ 1.0 mm) | 11.4 | 9.0 | 9.8 | 9.8 | 11.7 | 9.6 | 9.6 | 9.4 | 8.7 | 10.8 | 11.0 | 11.3 | 122.2 |
| Mean monthly sunshine hours | 88.2 | 113.1 | 173.9 | 191.0 | 220.0 | 255.8 | 273.8 | 249.1 | 194.7 | 141.0 | 90.6 | 78.2 | 2,069.2 |
Source: Meteociel

== Culture ==
Annecy has hosted the Annecy International Animated Film Festival since 1960 and the Rencontres Internationales d'Annecy Cinéma & Architecture since 1999 and it was one of the oldest festivals in France.

== Sport ==
On 23 July 2009, Annecy played host to Stage 18 of the Tour de France, as the start/finish point for an individual time trial around Lake Annecy. It was also the start town for stage 10 of the 2018 Tour de France on 17 July 2018.

Annecy launched a bid to host the 2018 Winter Olympics but lost to Pyeongchang. If they had been chosen, Annecy would have been the fourth French city to host the Winter Olympic Games, after Chamonix (1924), Grenoble (1968), and Albertville (1992).

Ligue 1 former team Évian Thonon Gaillard F.C. played their home matches in Annecy. The club was founded in 2007, they grew up to reach Ligue 1, and stayed for four years in the division, thanks to their emblematic manager Pascal Dupraz.

The Annecy basin is one of the world's leading locations for the sport of paragliding, an activity of some economic importance to the region. The area regularly hosts major competitions, most recently a leg of the Paragliding World Cup in 2012. Due to its proximity with the lake and the mountains, Annecy is also popular for watersports (sailing, rowing, wakeboarding, water skiing) and wintersports (alpine skiing, snowboarding, Nordic skiing). Le Semnoz, a relatively small ski resort, is 35 minutes away from Annecy. Other bigger ski resorts, La Clusaz and Le Grand Bornand, are only 40 minutes away. Annecy is also very popular among trail runners and many races are organized year round, such as the World Trail Running Championships in 2015.

== Main sights ==
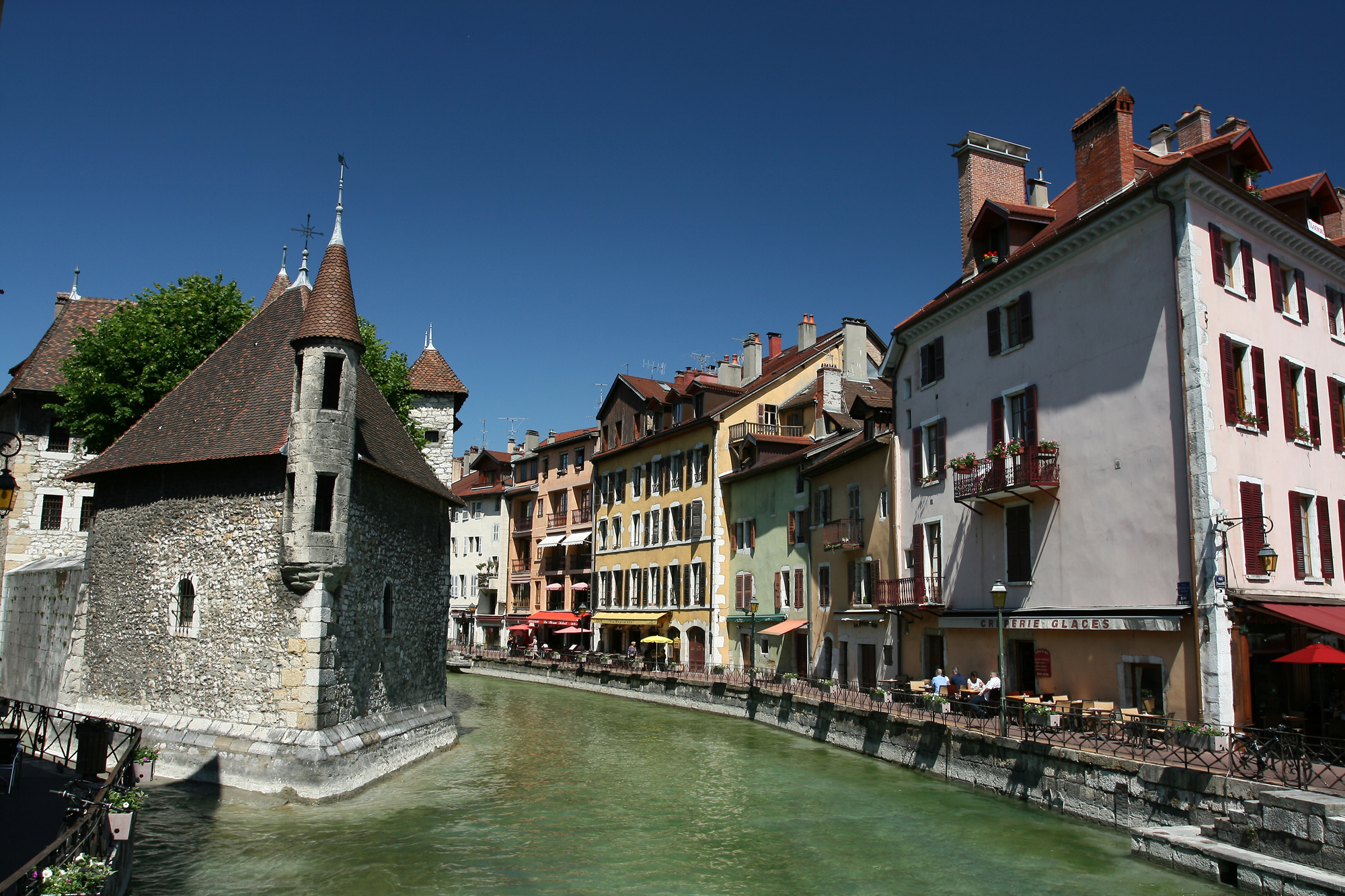
The Palais de l'Isle and Thiou river

- The Palais de l'Isle is a 12th-century castle on an island in the river Thiou in Annecy's administrative headquarters. It mostly served as a prison and courthouse until the French Revolution. It again was a prison during World War II. The Palais de l'Isle was classified as a Historical Monument in 1900, and today houses a local history museum.
- The Château d'Annecy (Annecy Castle) was the home of the Counts of Geneva and the Dukes of Genevois-Nemours, an offshoot
- The 15th century Église Saint-Maurice

== Education ==
- Université Savoie Mont Blanc
- Polytech'Savoie

== Population ==
Historical population

| Year | Pop. | ±% p.a. |
|---|---|---|
| 1793 | 4,440 | — |
| 1800 | 5,130 | +2.09% |
| 1806 | 5,467 | +1.07% |
| 1822 | 5,724 | +0.29% |
| 1838 | 8,252 | +2.31% |
| 1848 | 8,547 | +0.35% |
| 1858 | 10,374 | +1.96% |
| 1861 | 9,370 | −3.34% |
| 1866 | 11,554 | +4.28% |
| 1872 | 11,581 | +0.04% |
| 1876 | 10,976 | −1.33% |
| 1881 | 11,334 | +0.64% |
| 1886 | 11,817 | +0.84% |
| 1891 | 11,947 | +0.22% |
| 1896 | 12,894 | +1.54% |
| 1901 | 13,611 | +1.09% |
| 1906 | 14,351 | +1.06% |

| Year | Pop. | ±% p.a. |
|---|---|---|
| 1911 | 15,622 | +1.71% |
| 1921 | 15,004 | −0.40% |
| 1926 | 17,233 | +2.81% |
| 1931 | 20,289 | +3.32% |
| 1936 | 23,293 | +2.80% |
| 1946 | 26,722 | +1.38% |
| 1954 | 33,114 | +2.72% |
| 1962 | 43,255 | +3.40% |
| 1968 | 54,484 | +3.92% |
| 1975 | 53,262 | −0.32% |
| 1982 | 49,965 | −0.91% |
| 1990 | 49,644 | −0.08% |
| 1999 | 50,348 | +0.16% |
| 2007 | 51,119 | +0.19% |
| 2012 | 50,943 | −0.07% |
| 2017* | 126,924 | +20.03% |
| 2023 | 132,117 | +0.67% |

*Annecy was merged with four neighbouring communes in 2017.
Source: EHESS (1793–1999) and INSEE

== Research organisations ==
- LAPP Laboratoire d'Annecy-le-Vieux de Physique des Particules specialized in Physics
- LISTIC The Computer Science, Systems, Information and Knowledge Processing Laboratory
- Mecatronics department of CETIM
- Different R&D activities in the Université de Savoie and its École Polytechnique d'Ingénieurs: Polytech'Savoie.

== Economy ==
Logo of the City of Annecy

In the 19th century, the primary manufactures were linen and cotton goods, glass, cutlery, earthenware, and leather. The area also carried on linen bleaching and iron mining. By the First World War, it was connected by rail to Aix-les-Bains and there were factories for linen and cotton goods, felt hats, and paper. Fonderie Paccard, famous for its church bells and reproductions of the Liberty Bell, was located in the town until 1989 when it moved to nearby Sevrier.

Companies located in and around Annecy include:

- Salomon Group
- adixen Vacuum Products
- Sopra Group
- Ubisoft Annecy

== Transport ==
The Gare d'Annecy railway station offers connections with Lyon, Geneva, Paris, Grenoble and several regional destinations.

Annecy – Haute-Savoie – Mont Blanc Airport currently used for private air transport only.

The nearest passenger airports to Annecy are Chambéry Airport which is 35 km away, Geneva Airport is 45 km away and Lyon Airport which is also 125 km away from Annecy.

== Twin towns – sister cities ==
Annecy is twinned with:

- Bayreuth, Germany
- Cheltenham, England, United Kingdom
- Liptovský Mikuláš, Slovakia
- Sainte-Thérèse, Canada
- Vicenza, Italy

=== Associations ===
Together with other Alpine towns Annecy engages in the Alpine Town of the Year Association for the implementation of the Alpine Convention to achieve sustainable development in the Alpine Arc. Annecy was also Alpine Town of the Year 2012.

== Notable people ==
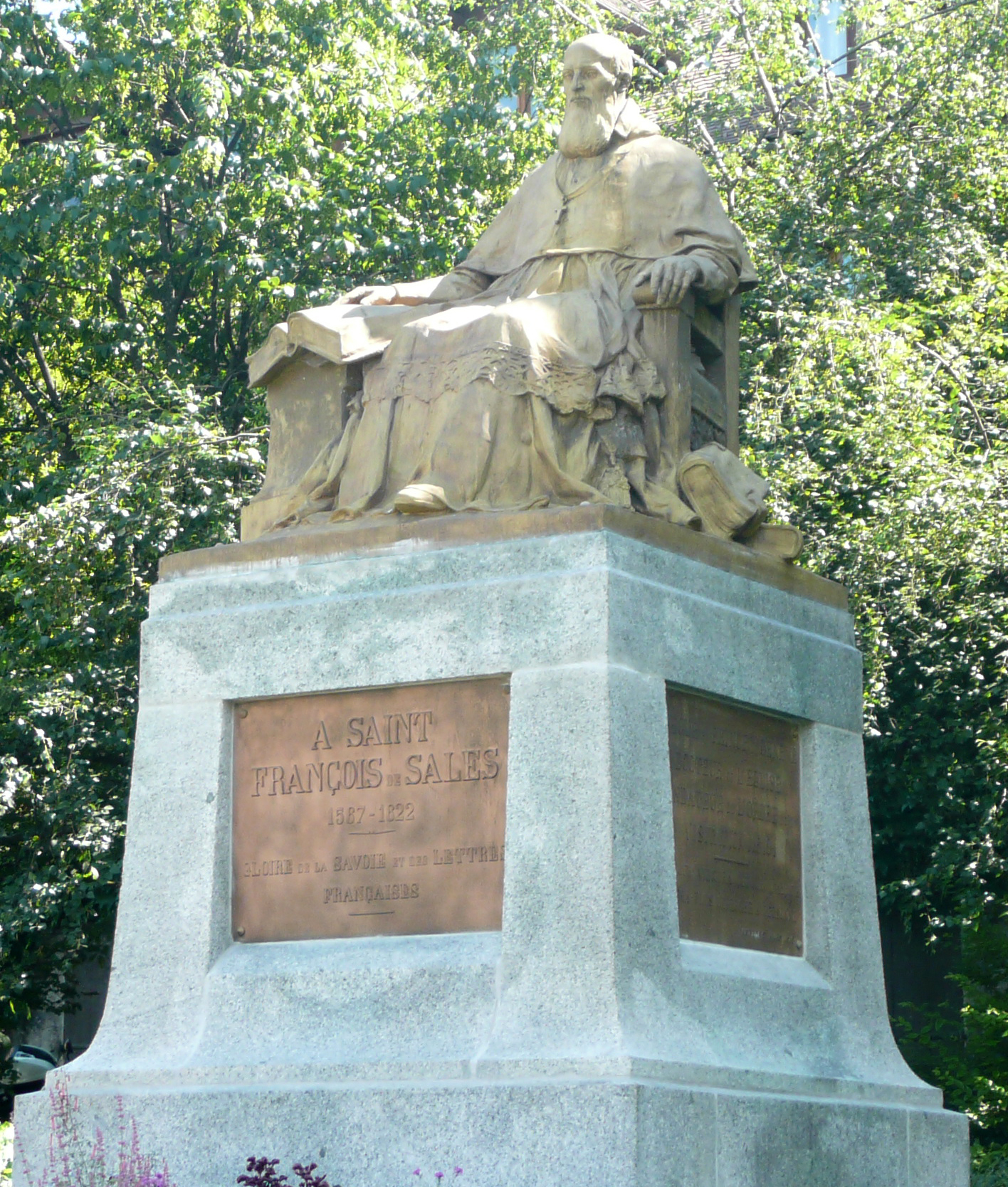
Francis de Sales in Annecy

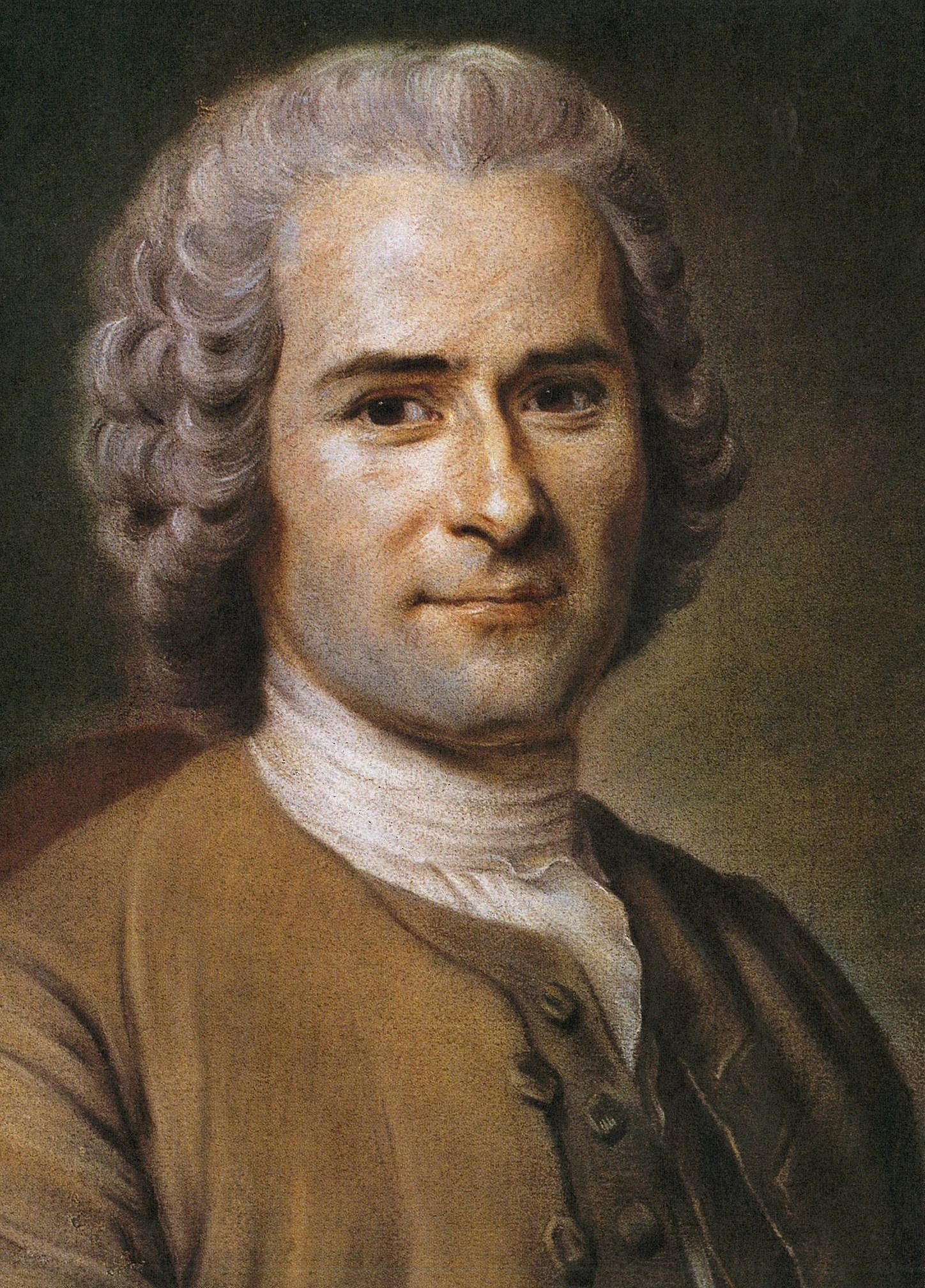
Jean-Jacques Rousseau

- Bernard Accoyer (born 1945), politician, President of the National Assembly 2007 to 2012 and Mayor of Annecy-le-Vieux.
- Bernard Bosson (1948–2017), politician, Govt. minister & Mayor of Annecy
- Jules Bouyer (born 2002), diver
- Eustace Chapuys (c. 1490–1556), Imperial ambassador to the English Court of Henry VIII
- Francis de Sales (1567–1622), bishop of Geneva / Annecy and Catholic Saint.
- André Dussollier (born 1946), actor
- Emmanuel Leducq-Barôme (born 1971), conductor, works in Russia
- Jacques Leveugle (born 1946), retired teacher charged with 89 cases of pedophilia and 2 murders
- Bernard Miège (born 1941), a media theorist and academic administrator.
- Guillaume Perret (born 1980), jazz musician and composer
- Emmanuel Tarpin (born 1992), contemporary jewelry designer
- Cécile Vogt-Mugnier (1875–1962), brain researcher

=== Sport ===
- Louis Lachenal (1921–1955), alpinist, one of the first two mountaineers to climb a summit of more than 8,000 meters.
- Bernard Collomb (1930–2011), racing driver
- Vincent Vittoz (born 1975), cross-country skier
- Johan Clarey (born 1981), alpine skier, silver medallist at the 2022 Winter Olympics
- Thomas Fanara (born 1981), alpine skier, competed in three Winter Olympics
- Bernard Grosfilley (1949–2020), alpine skier, competed at the Alpine Ski World Cup
- David Poisson (born 1982), alpine skier, competed in two Winter Olympics
- Steve Missillier (born 1984), alpine skier, silver medallist at the 2014 Winter Olympics
- Jonathan Midol (born 1988), freestyle skier, bronze medallist at the 2014 Winter Olympics
- Christophe Lemaitre (born 1990), sprinter, bronze medallist at the 2016 Summer Olympics
- Côme Ledogar (born 1991), racing driver
- Axelle Mollaret (born 1992), physiotherapist, skyrunner and ski mountaineer
- Hugo Lapalus (born 1998), cross-country skier, team bronze medallist at the 2022 Winter Olympics
- Sacha Fenestraz (born 1999), French-Argentine racing driver
- Loana Lecomte (born 1999), cross-country mountain bike cyclist
- Sébastien Baud (born 2000), racing driver

=== Associated with the city ===
- Jane Frances de Chantal (1572–1641), Holy of the Catholic Church, founded in Annecy the Order of Salesian Sisters
- Jean Coppier, of the Coppier family, notary in Annecy in 1396.
- Claude Favre de Vaugelas (1585–1650), man of letters, philologist and grammarian.
- Jean-Jacques Rousseau (1712–1778), writer and philosopher, spent some time in Annecy.
- Claude Louis Berthollet (1748–1822), physician and chemist, began medical studies locally in 1760.
- Eugène Sue (1804–1857), writer, spent his last years in exile in Annecy and died there.

== Gallery ==
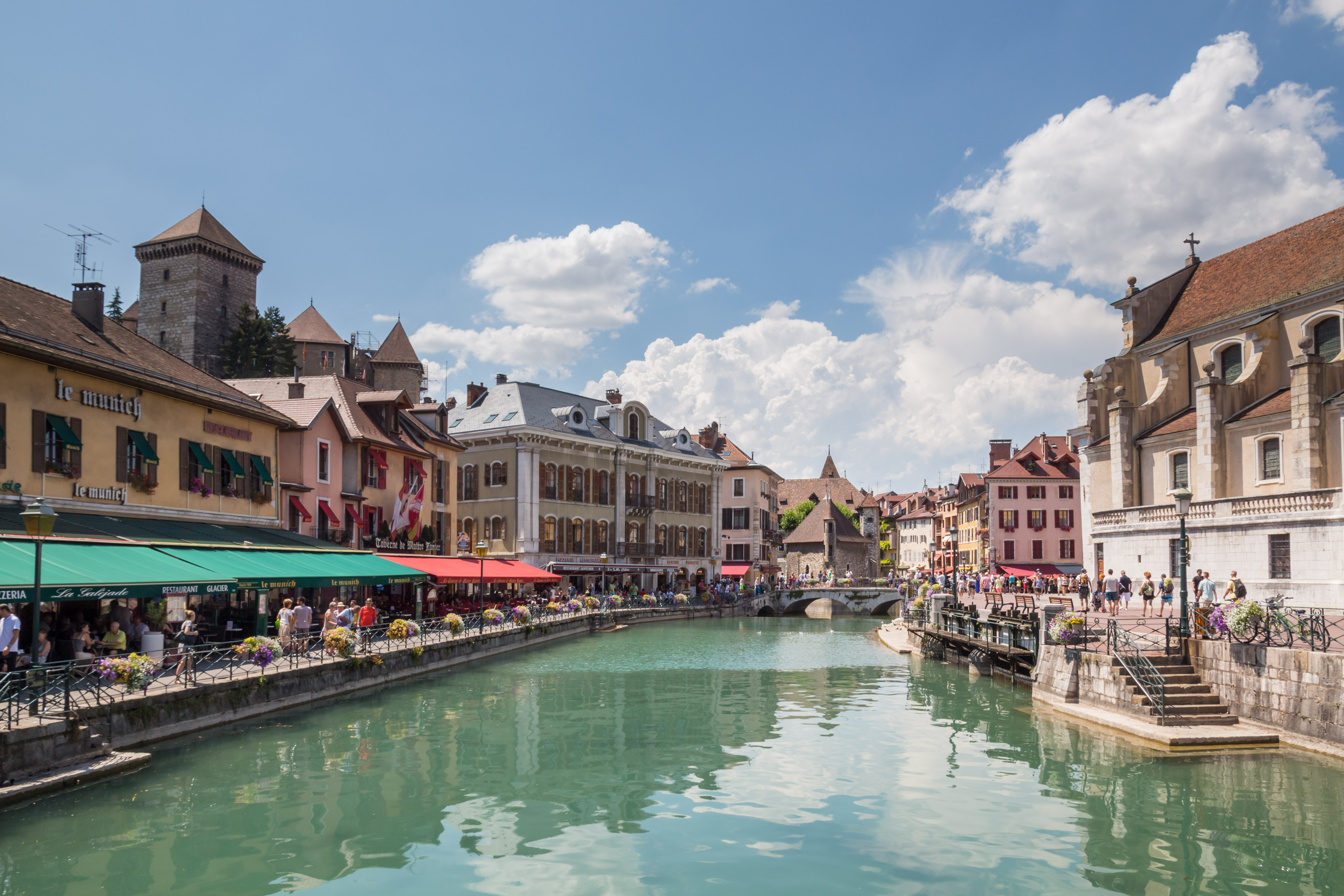
Annecy, the "Venice of the Alps"

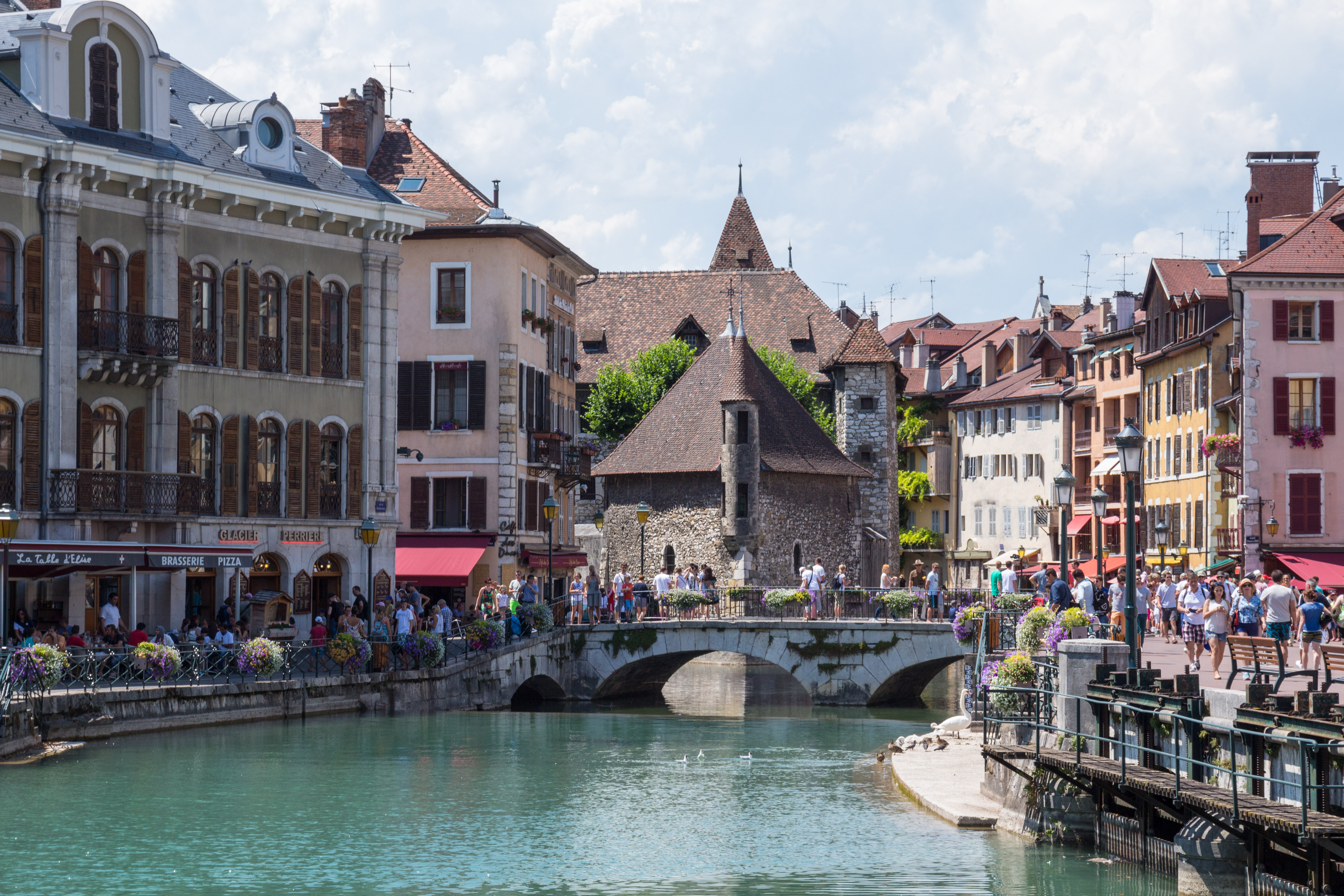
Palais de l'Isle jail

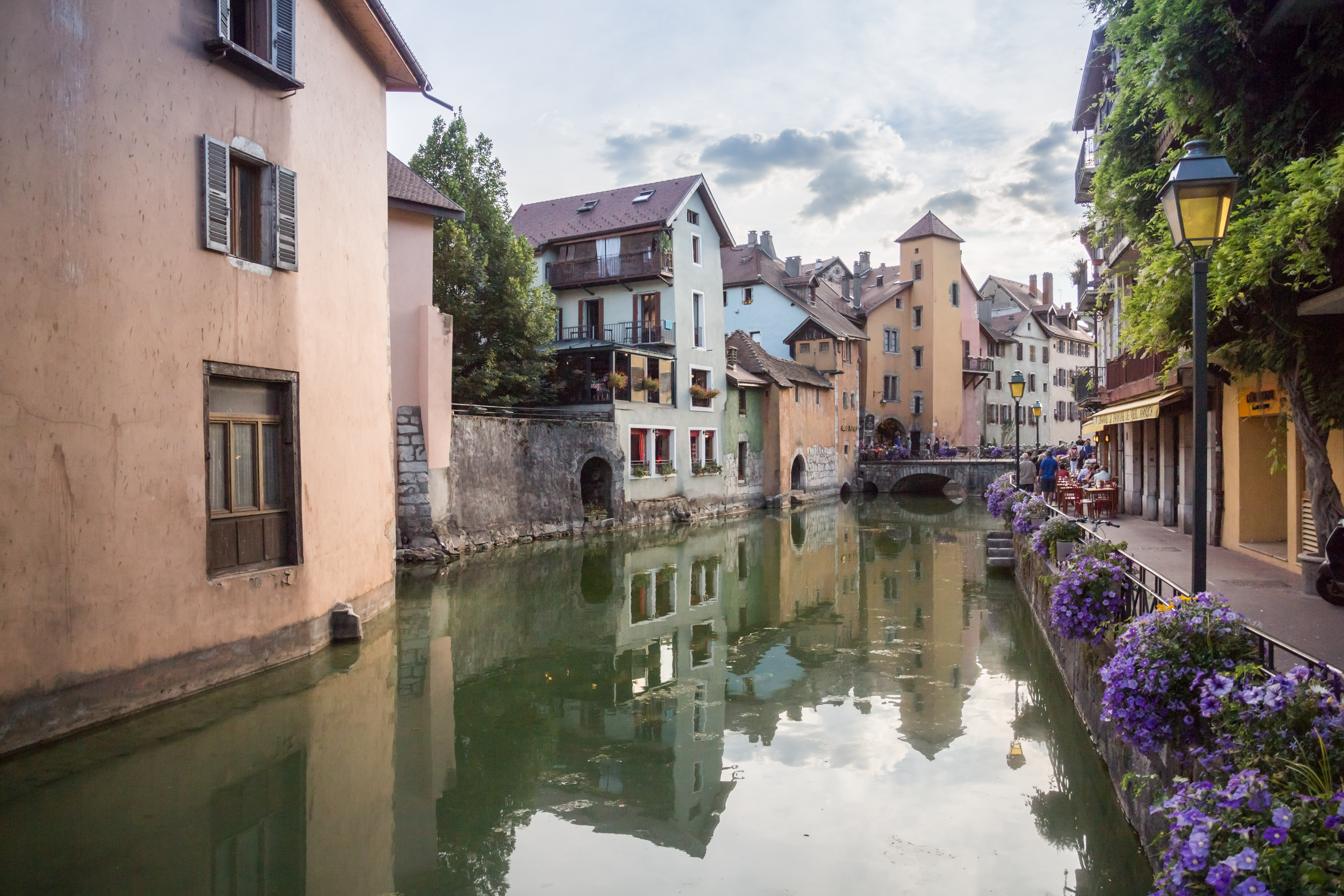
Houses along the Thiou river

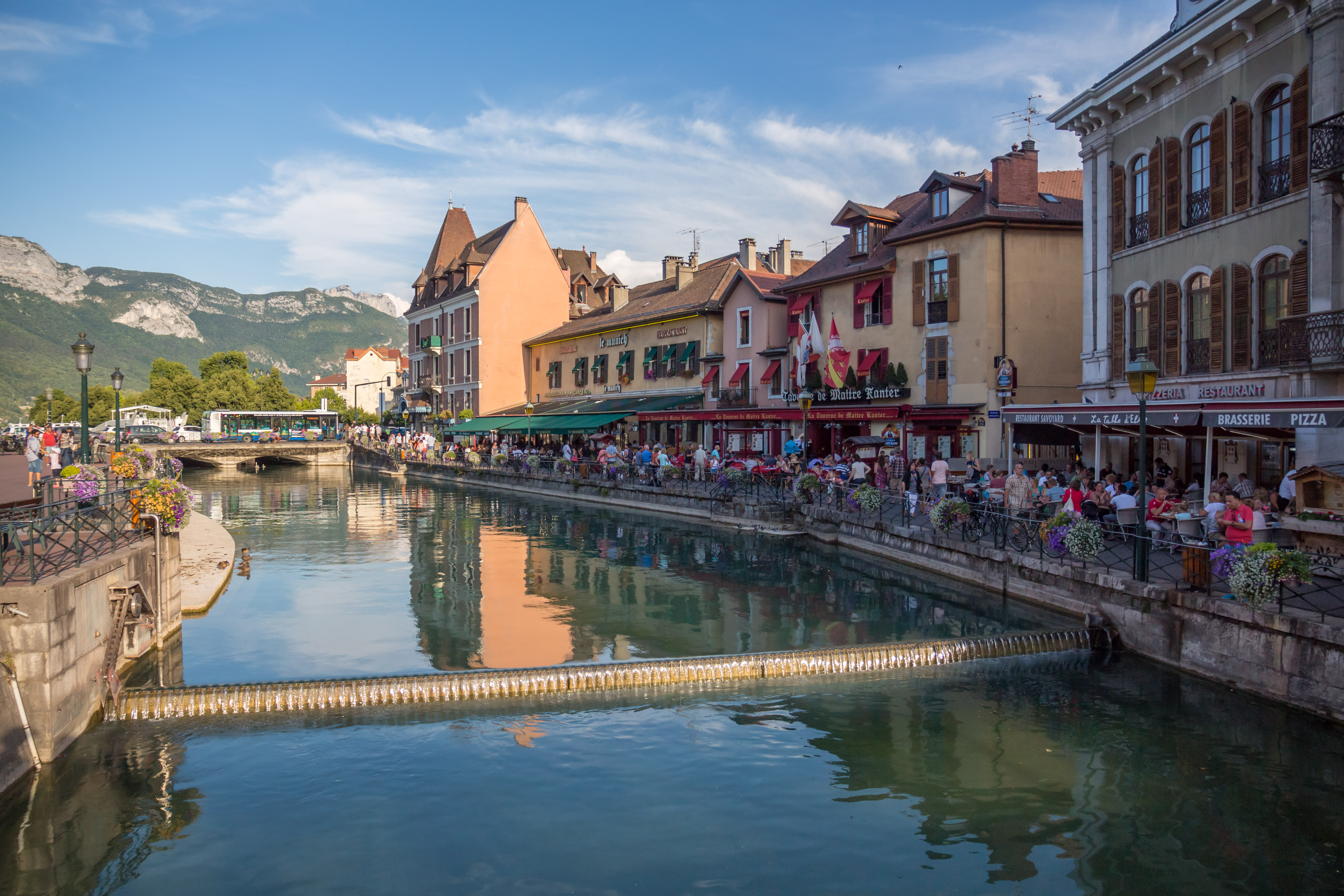
Restaurants along the Thiou river

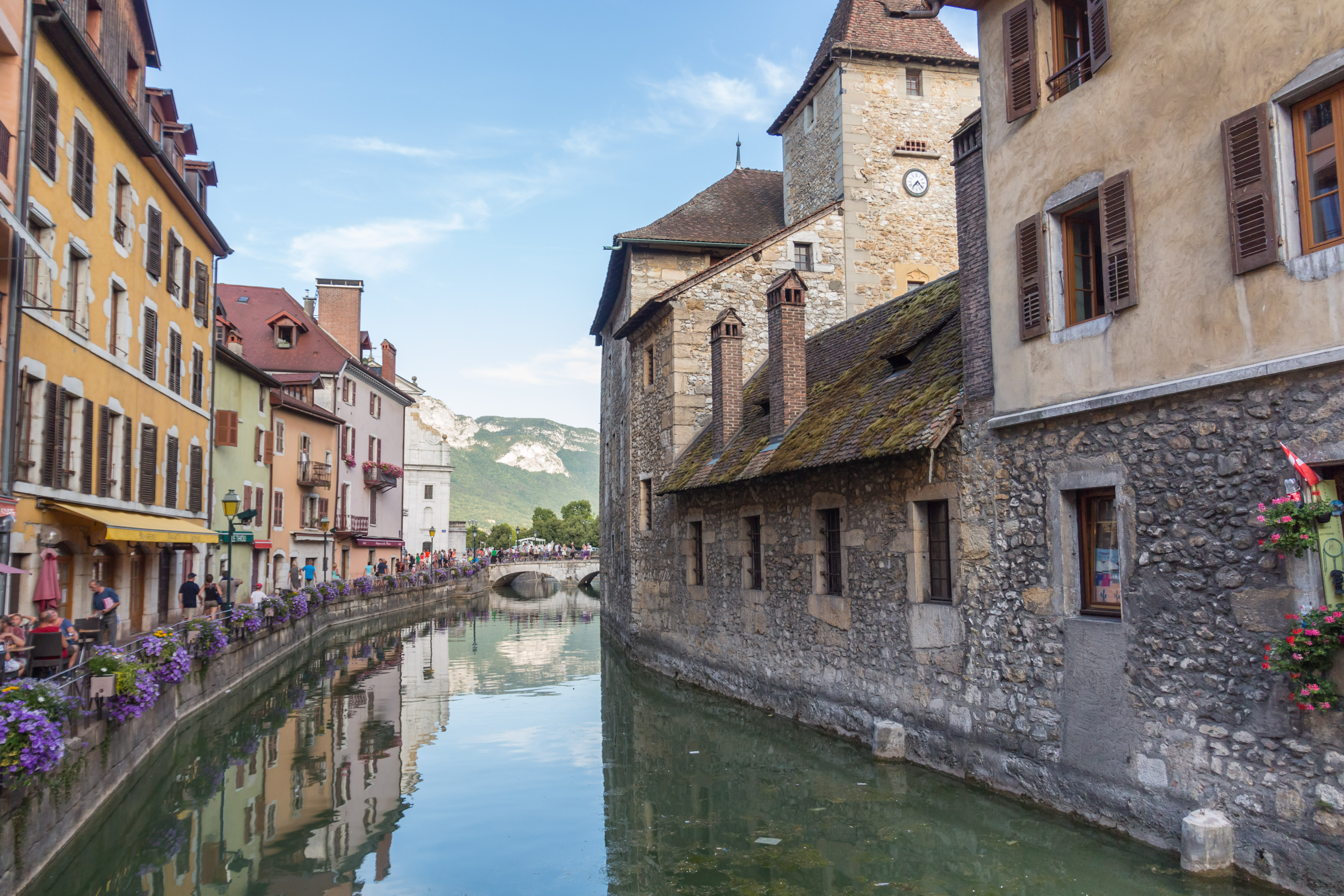
Thiou river

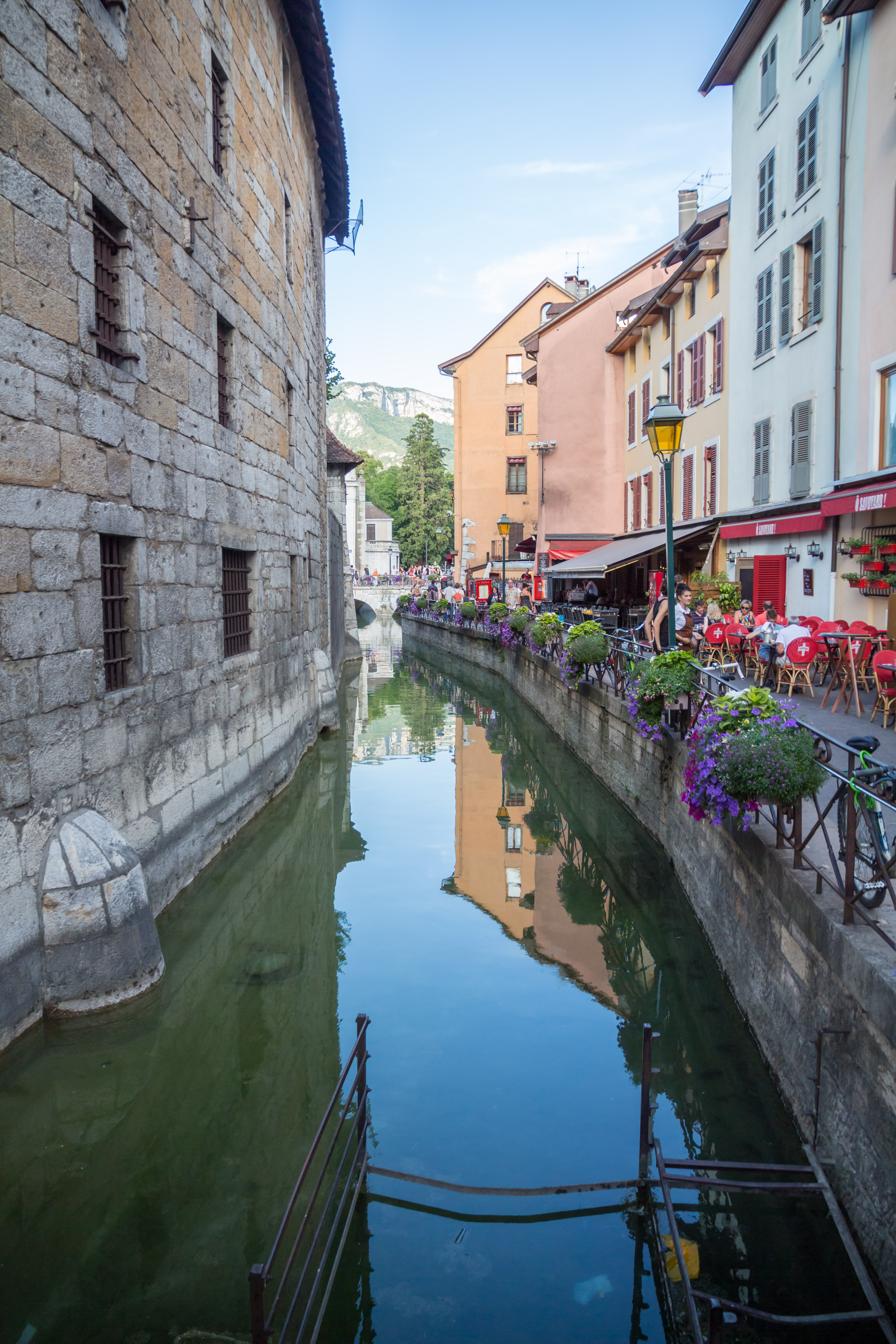
Thiou river

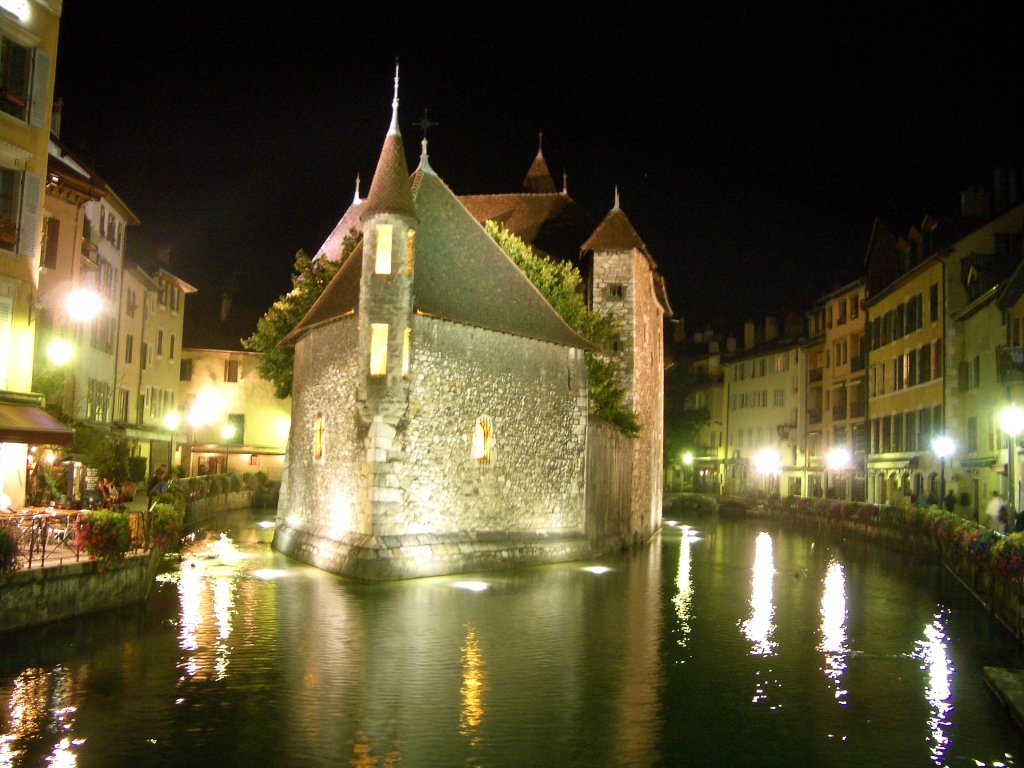
Palais de l'Isle jail by night

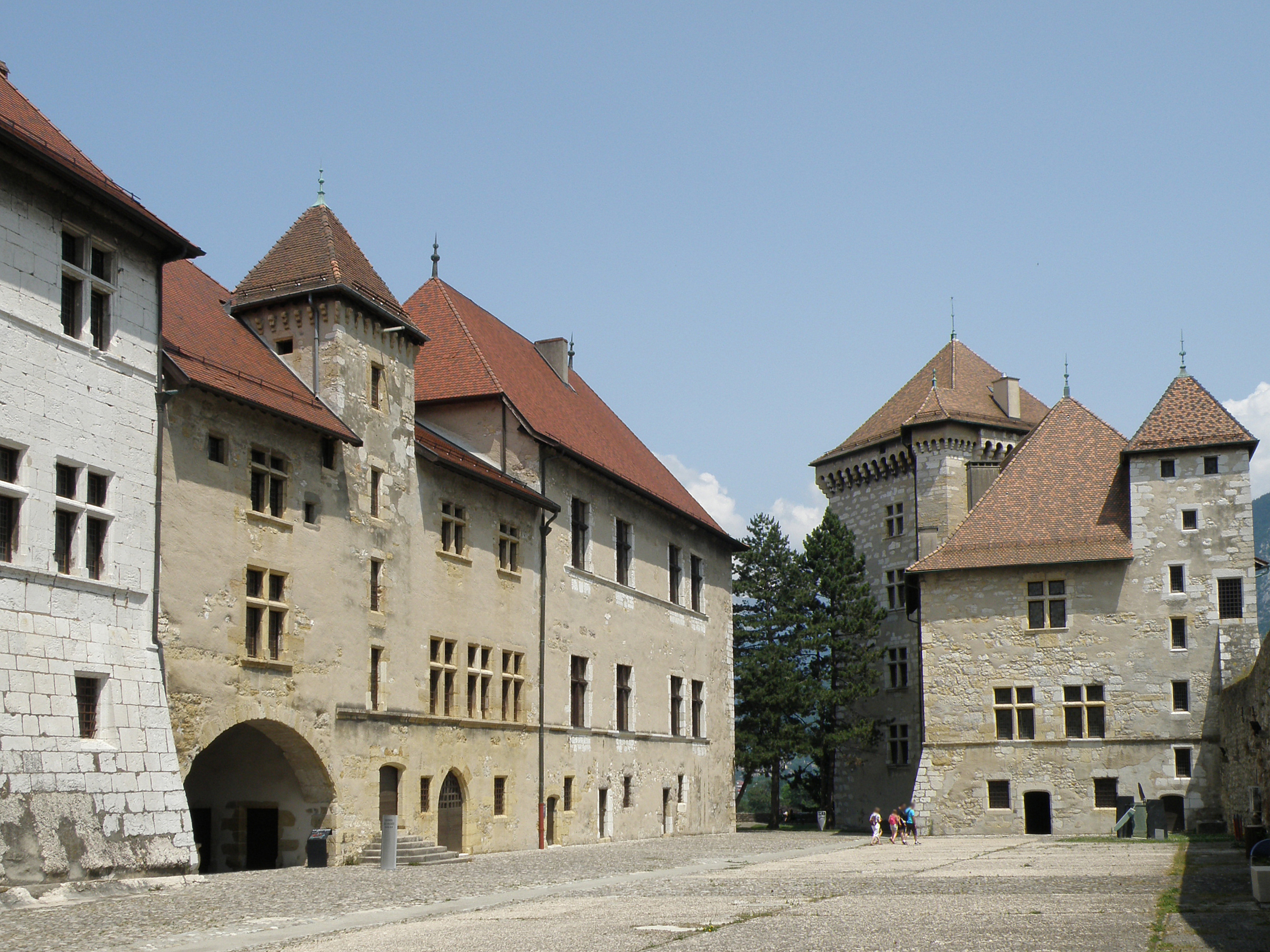
Annecy Château

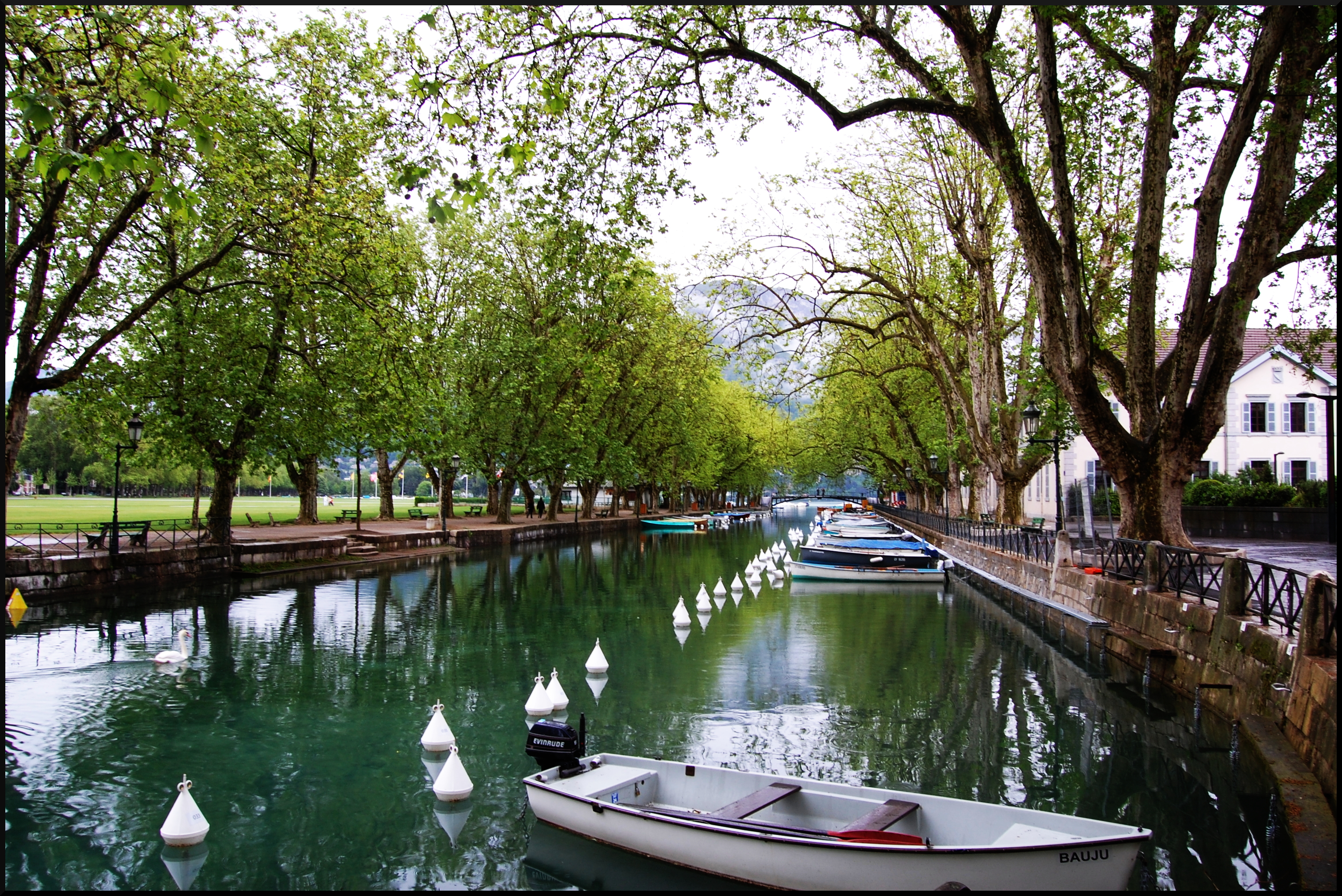
View of the Canal

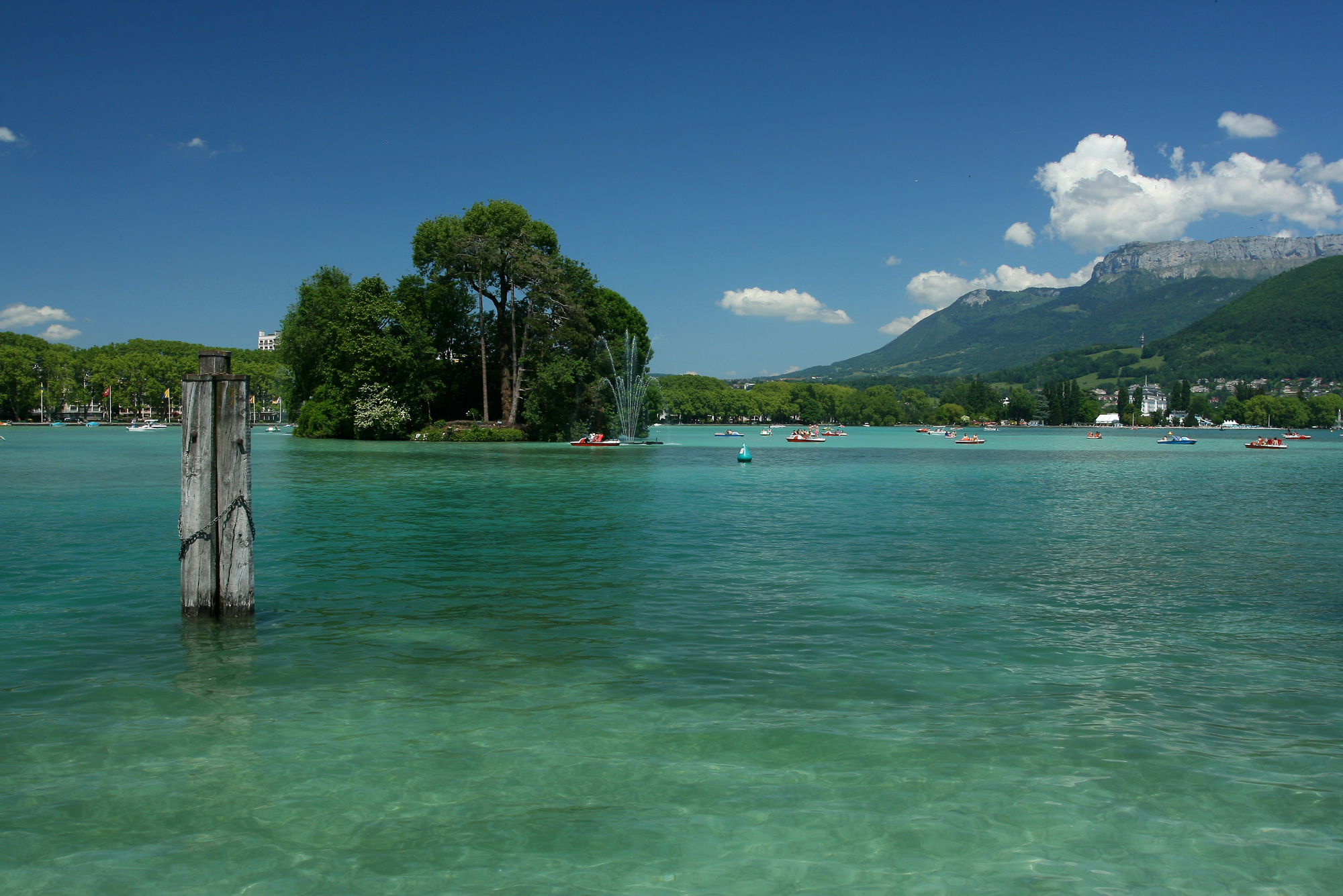
Lake Annecy from the south dock of Annecy

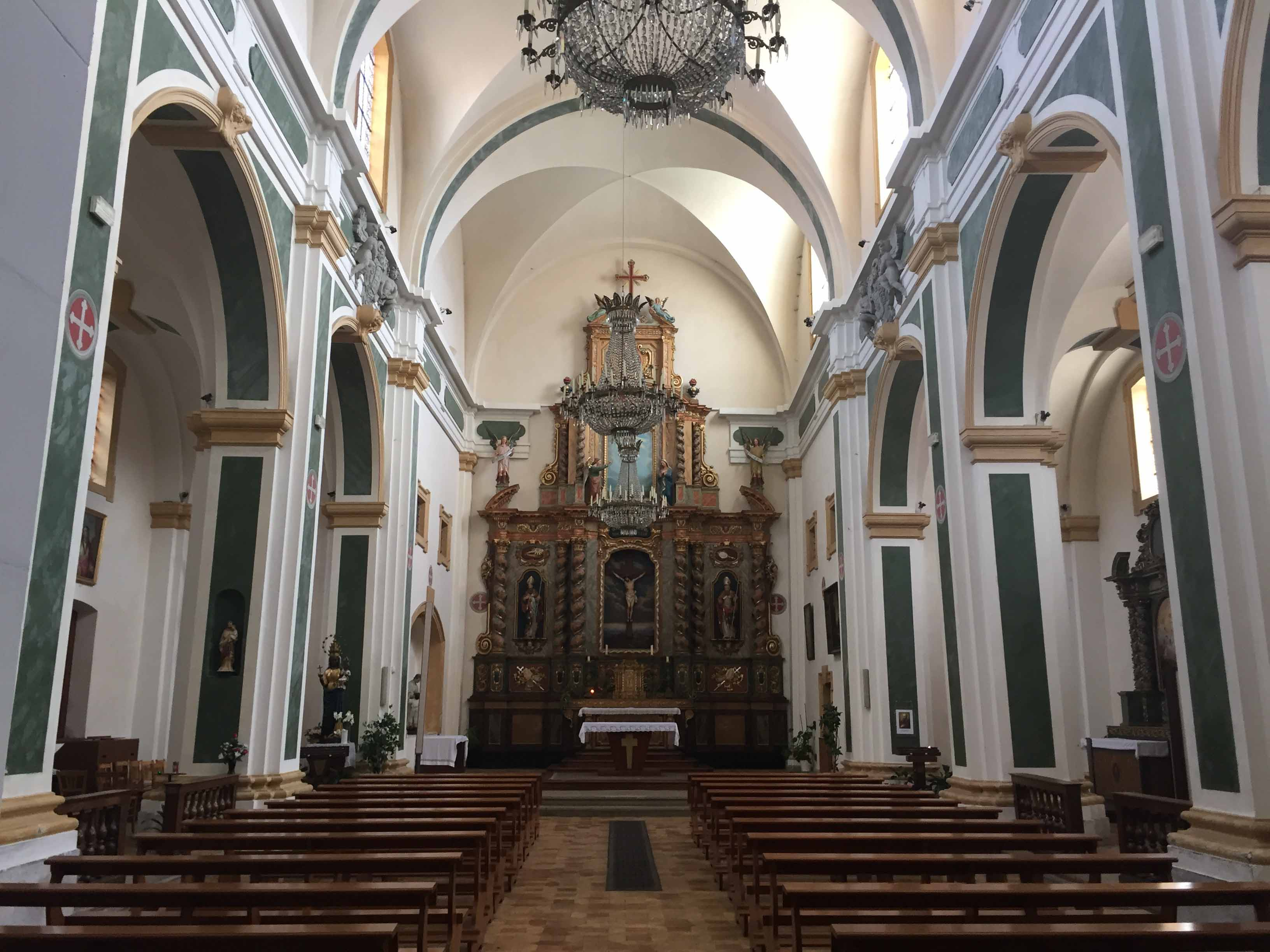
Church of St. Francis

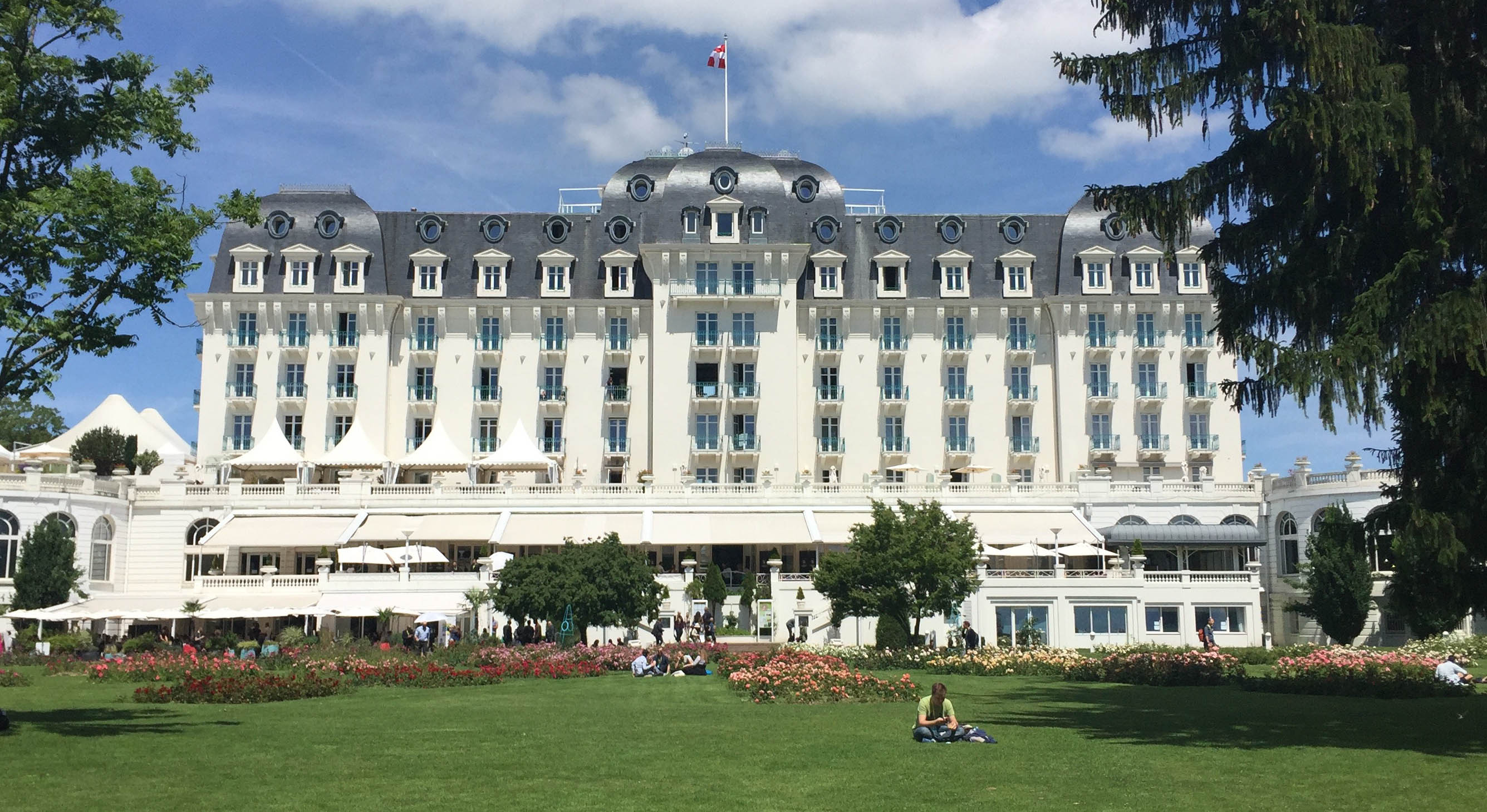
Imperial Hotel

== See also ==
- Geneva Canton
- Roman Catholic Diocese of Annecy
- Arpitan language – Franco-Provençal language
- Arpitania
