= Annecy–Haute-Savoie–Mont Blanc Airport =

Annecy–Haute-Savoie–Mont Blanc Airport Aéroport Annecy Haute-Savoie Mont Blanc
- IATA: NCY; ICAO: LFLP

Summary
- Airport type: Public
- Operator: CCI de Haute Savoie
- Serves: Annecy, France
- Location: Meythet, France
- Elevation AMSL: 1,521 ft / 464 m
- Coordinates: 45°55′51″N 006°06′23″E
- Website: www.annecy-airport.com

Maps
- Location of the Rhône-Alpes region in France

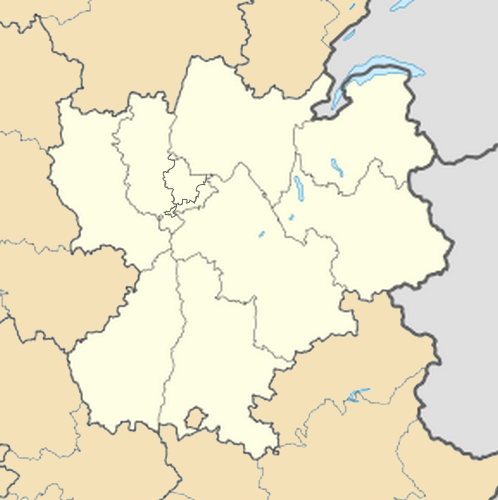
- Location of airport in the Rhône-Alpes region

Runways
Direction	Length		Surface
Direction	m	ft	Surface
04/22	1,630	5,348	Asphalt
- Source: French AIP

Annecy–Haute-Savoie–Mont Blanc Airport or Aéroport Annecy Haute-Savoie Mont Blanc (IATA: NCY, ICAO: LFLP), also known as Aéroport d'Annecy - Meythet, is an airport located 3.5 km northwest of Annecy, between Meythet and Metz-Tessy, all communes of the Haute-Savoie département in the Rhône-Alpes région of France.

== Airlines and destinations ==
No destinations served at present.
