= Église Saint-Maurice, Annecy =

Church in Annecy, France

Coordinates: 45°53′57″N 6°7′40″E

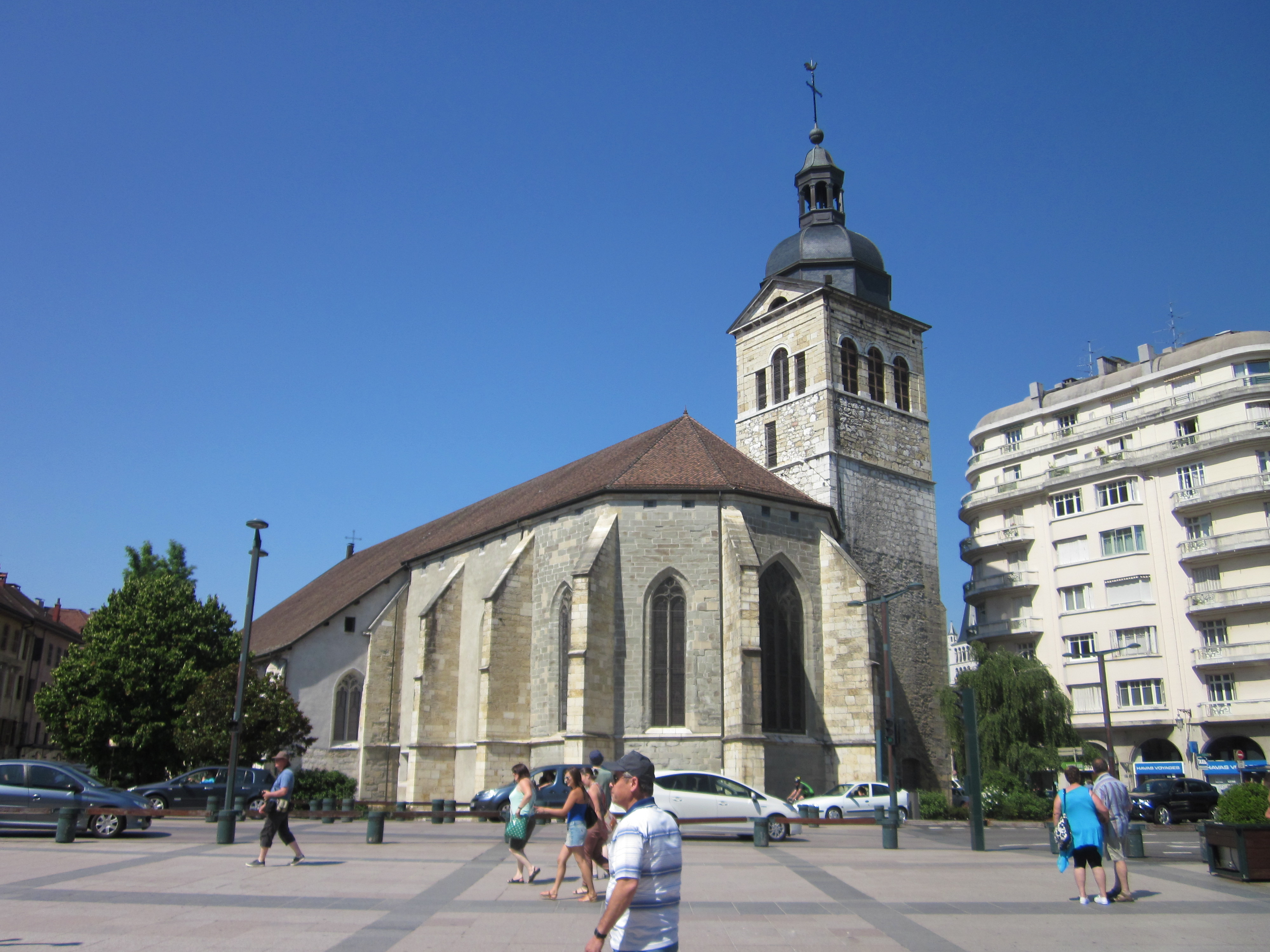

Église Saint-Maurice (in English, St. Maurice Church) is a Roman Catholic church in Annecy, France.

It is the oldest church in Annecy. It was originally built as a chapel of a Dominican convent in 1422, sponsored by Cardinal Jean-Allarmet de Brogny.

The church has a Gothic style architecture. Chapels are built in different parts of the nave by noble families or artisan corporations from 1478 onwards, forming the present lower sides of the church. Notably, there is a 15th-century "trompe-l'œil" painting to the left of the choir.

The building is designated as a national monument in 1957.

The nave

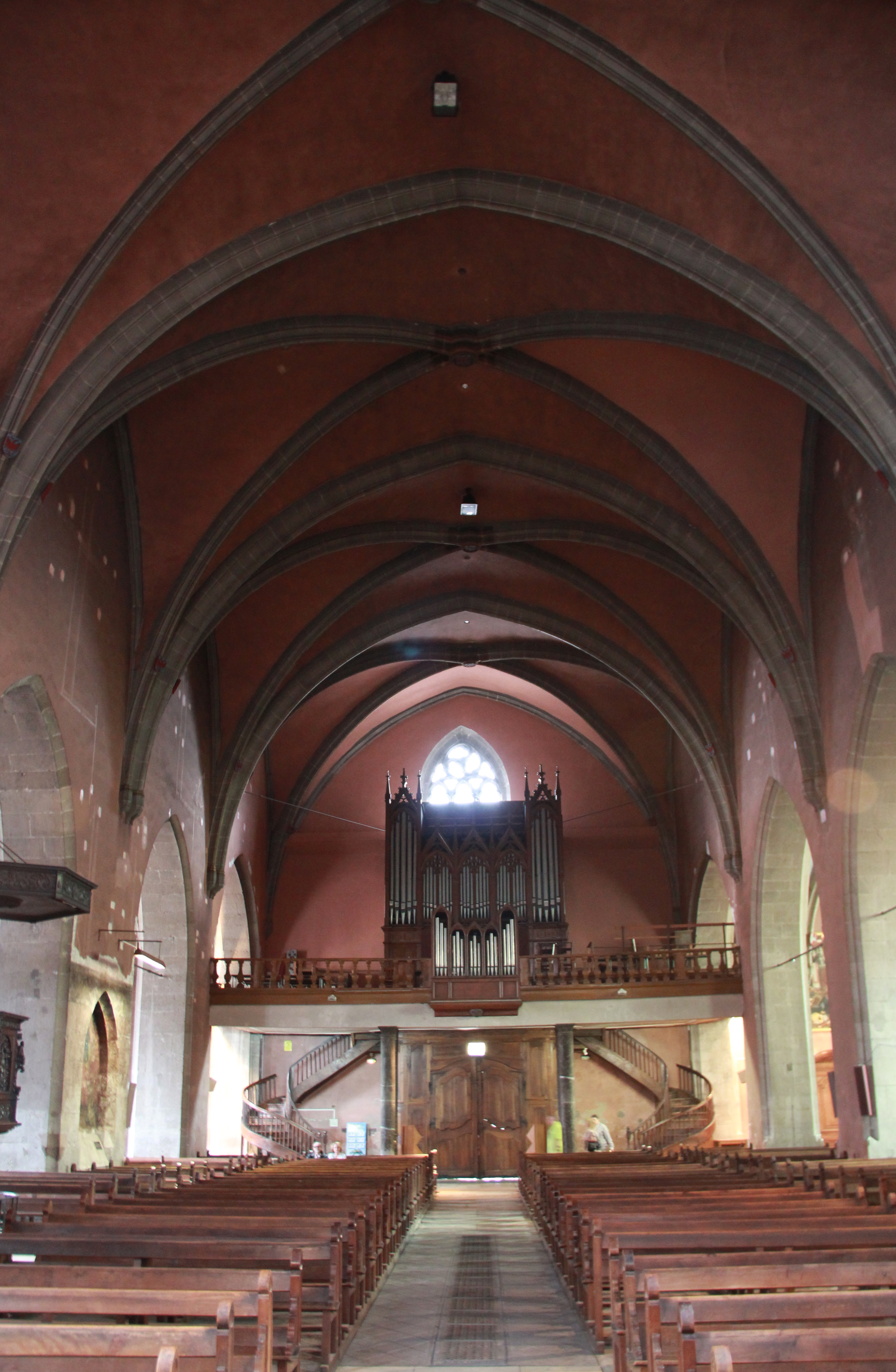
The organ

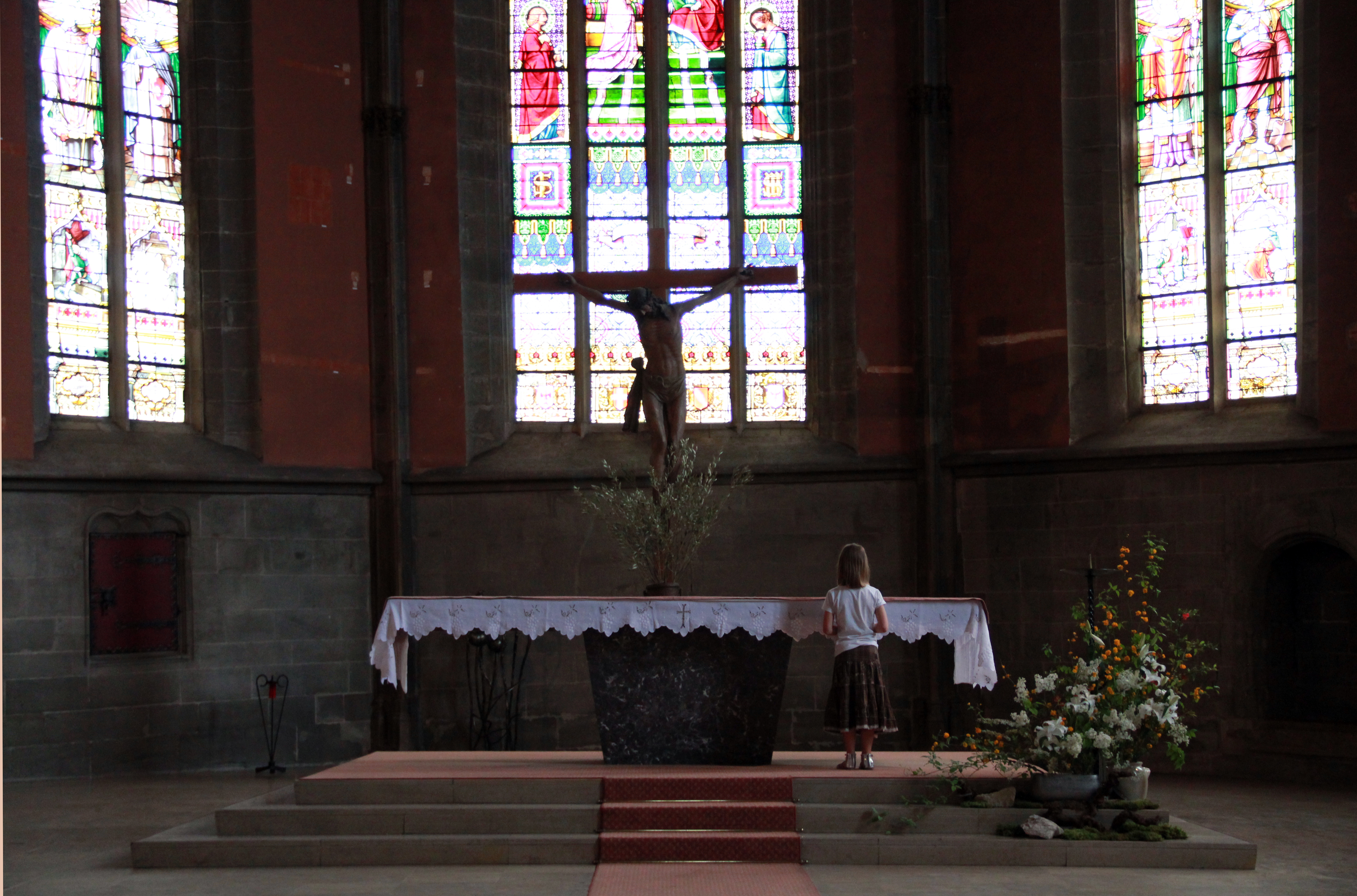
The altar

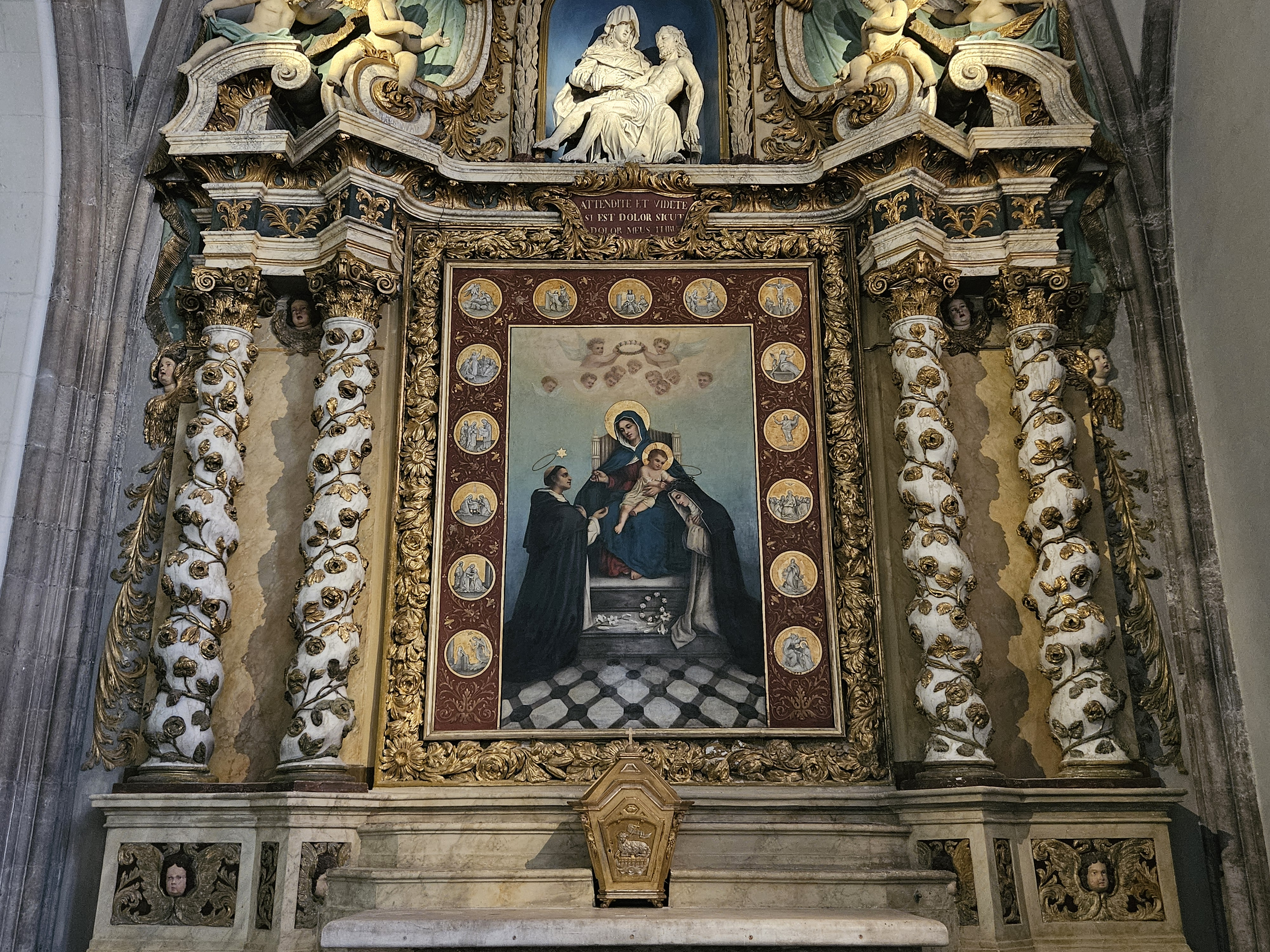
Rosary Chapel

== See also ==
- Roman Catholic Diocese of Annecy
