= Canton of Annecy-2 =

Coordinates: 45.90°N 6.13°E

The canton of Annecy-2 is an administrative division of the Haute-Savoie department, southeastern France. It was created at the French canton reorganisation which came into effect in March 2015. Its seat is in Annecy.

It consists of the following communes:

1. Annecy (partly)
2. Sevrier
