= Hôtel de Ville, Annecy =

Town hall in Annecy, France

Hôtel de Ville
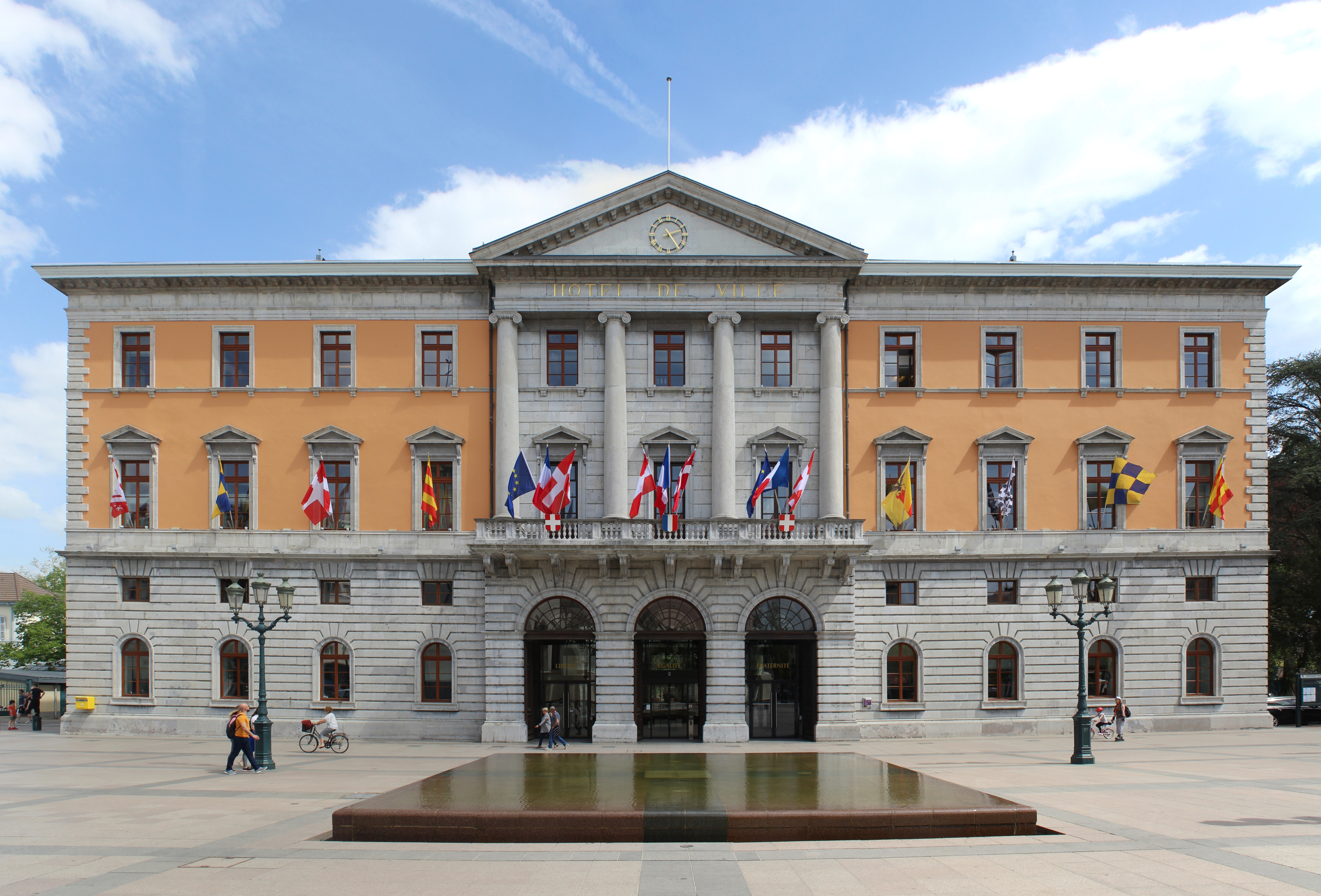
- The main frontage of the Hôtel de Ville in April 2018
- Interactive map of the Hôtel de Ville area

General information
- Type: City hall
- Architectural style: Neoclassical style
- Location: Annecy, France
- Coordinates: 45.8993°N 6.1293°E
- Completed: 1851

Design and construction
- Architect: François Justin

The Hôtel de Ville (French pronunciation: [otɛl də vil], City Hall) is a municipal building in Annecy, Haute-Savoie, southeastern France, standing on the Esplanade de l'Hôtel de Ville.

== History ==
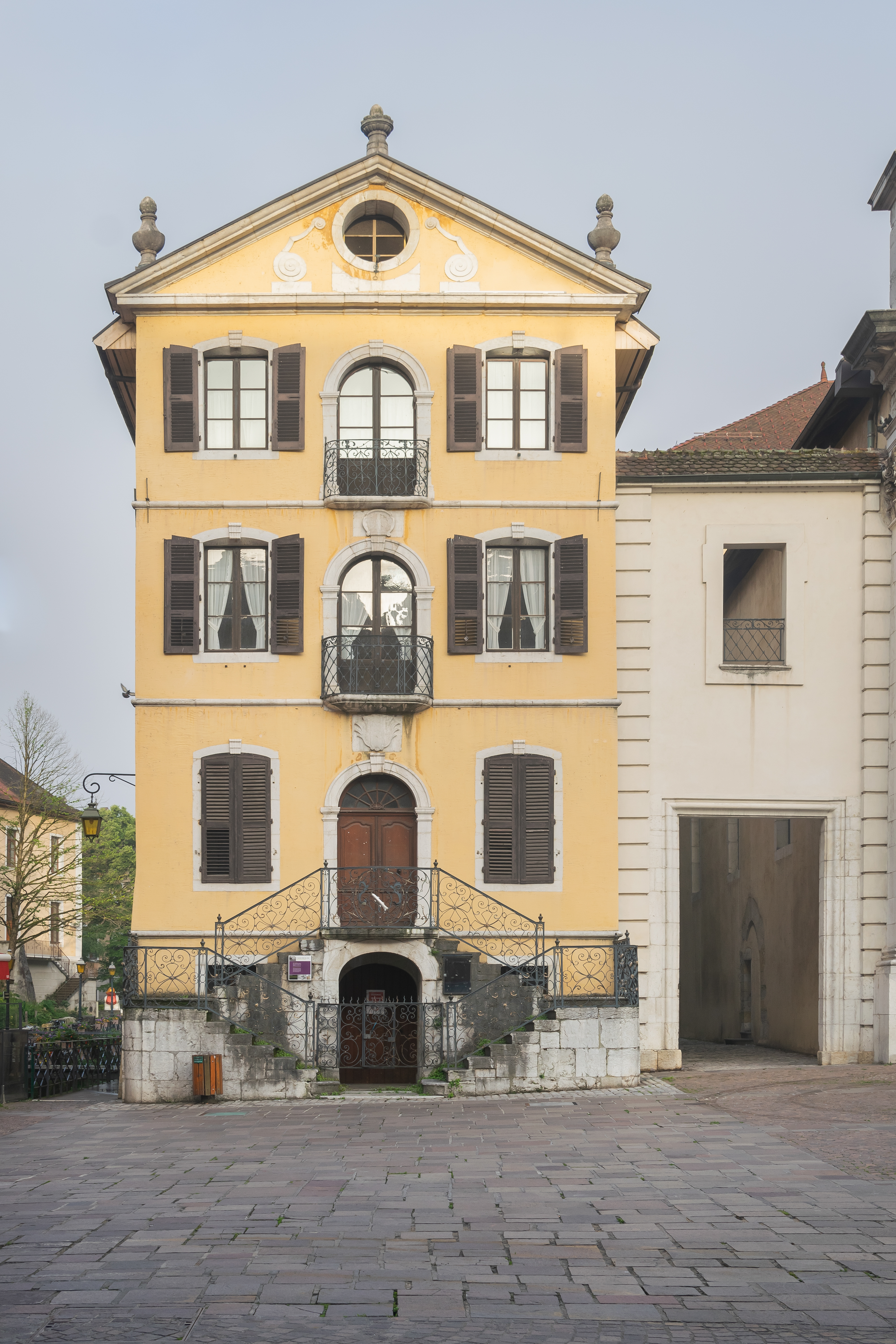
The first Hôtel de Ville

The first town hall, adjacent to l'église Notre-Dame-de-Liesse in Rue Notre Dame, dated back at least to the mid-18th century. The building was commissioned as a hospital and converted for municipal use in 1770. It was a four-storey building with a forestair leading up to a round headed doorway with a moulded surround and a keystone on the first floor. There were round headed windows with moulded surrounds and balconies on the second and third floors. It was surmounted by a pediment with an oculus in the tympanum and finials at the apex and corners. The design made extensive use of ironwork on the forestair and balconies. At the top of the forestair, the ironwork featured a trout, which formed part of the municipal coat of arms and which impressed the writer, John Ruskin, on a visit to the city.

In the 1840s, when Annecy was part of the Kingdom of Sardinia, the city council decided to commission a more substantial town hall. The site they selected was on the lakeside adjacent to Lake Annecy. After the proposed design for the new building was approved by the council in 1846, construction work started in 1847. It was designed by François Justin in the neoclassical style, built in ashlar stone and was completed in 1851.

The design involved a symmetrical main frontage of 13 bays facing onto the Esplanade de l'Hôtel de Ville. The central section of three bays, which was slightly projected forward, featured three double-height round-headed openings with voussoirs on the ground floor. Spanning the second and third floors, there was a tetrastyle portico formed by Ionic order columns supporting an entablature and a modillioned pediment, with a clock in the tympanum. The wings were fenestrated by round headed windows on the ground floor, square headed windows on the first floor, casement windows with pediments on the second floor and plain casement windows on the third floor. There was a modillioned cornice above and there were quoins at the corners. Internally, the principal room was the Salle du Conseil (council chamber).

The town hall remained an important administrative centre after Savoy was annexed by France, under the Treaty of Turin in 1860. The area in front of the building was used as a car park until 1995, when it was landscaped and a square overflowing water feature, designed by Jean-Michel Wilmotte, was installed in the centre.

A major fire, caused by a fault in an electrical cabinet, led to extensive damage to the upper floors and roof of the building on the afternoon of 14 November 2019. An extensive programme of restoration works, intended to rectify the damage cased by the fire, is being commissioned, based on designs by Pierre-Louis Faloci, at a cost of €30 million. The works are due to start in March 2025 and are expected to be completed in the first quarter of 2027.
