= Sevrier =

- Commune
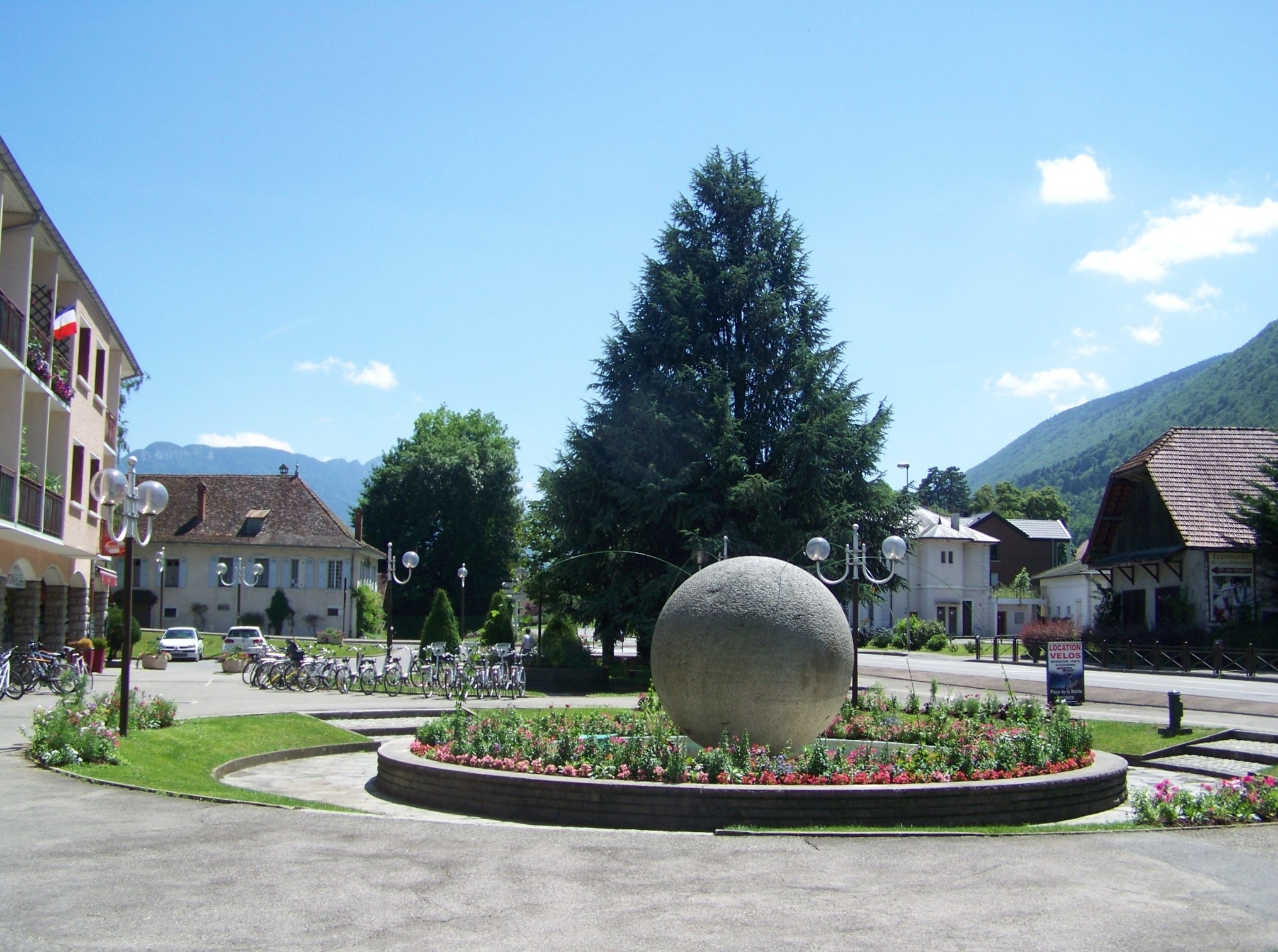
- The Town Hall Square in Sevrier

- Coat of arms
- Location of Sevrier
- Location within France Location within Auvergne-Rhône-Alpes
- Coordinates: 45°51′55″N 6°08′26″E
- Country: France
- Region: Auvergne-Rhône-Alpes
- Department: Haute-Savoie
- Arrondissement: Annecy
- Canton: Annecy-2
- Intercommunality: CA Grand Annecy

Government
  - Mayor (2020–2026): Bruno Lyonnaz
- Area^{1}: 12.65 km^{2} (4.88 sq mi)
- Elevation: 456 m (1,496 ft)
- Highest elevation: 1,287 m (4,222 ft)
- Lowest elevation: 440 m (1,440 ft)
- Population (2023): 4,333
  - Density: 342.5/km^{2} (887.1/sq mi)
- Time zone: UTC+01:00 (CET)
  - Summer (DST): UTC+02:00 (CEST)
- INSEE/Postal code: 74267 /74320
- ^{1} French Land Register data, which excludes lakes, ponds, glaciers > 1 km^{2} (0.386 sq mi or 247 acres) and river estuaries.

Sevrier (French pronunciation: [səvʁije]; before 2017: Sévrier; Arpitan: Sevrî) is a commune in the Haute-Savoie department in the Auvergne-Rhône-Alpes region in south-eastern France.

It is located on the north-western banks of Lake Annecy. It is essentially a residential suburb of Annecy.

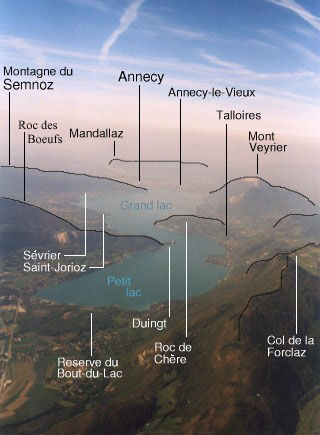
Geographical features around Lake Annecy

== Population ==
Historical population
Year	Pop.	±% p.a.
1968	1,790	—
1975	2,163	+2.74%
1982	2,465	+1.88%
1990	2,980	+2.40%
1999	3,421	+1.55%
2007	3,855	+1.50%
2012	4,078	+1.13%
2017	4,161	+0.40%
2023	4,333	+0.68%
Source: INSEE

== World Heritage Site ==
It is home to one or more prehistoric pile-dwelling (or stilt house) settlements that are part of the Prehistoric Pile dwellings around the Alps UNESCO World Heritage Site.

== See also ==
- Communes of the Haute-Savoie department
