= Thiou =

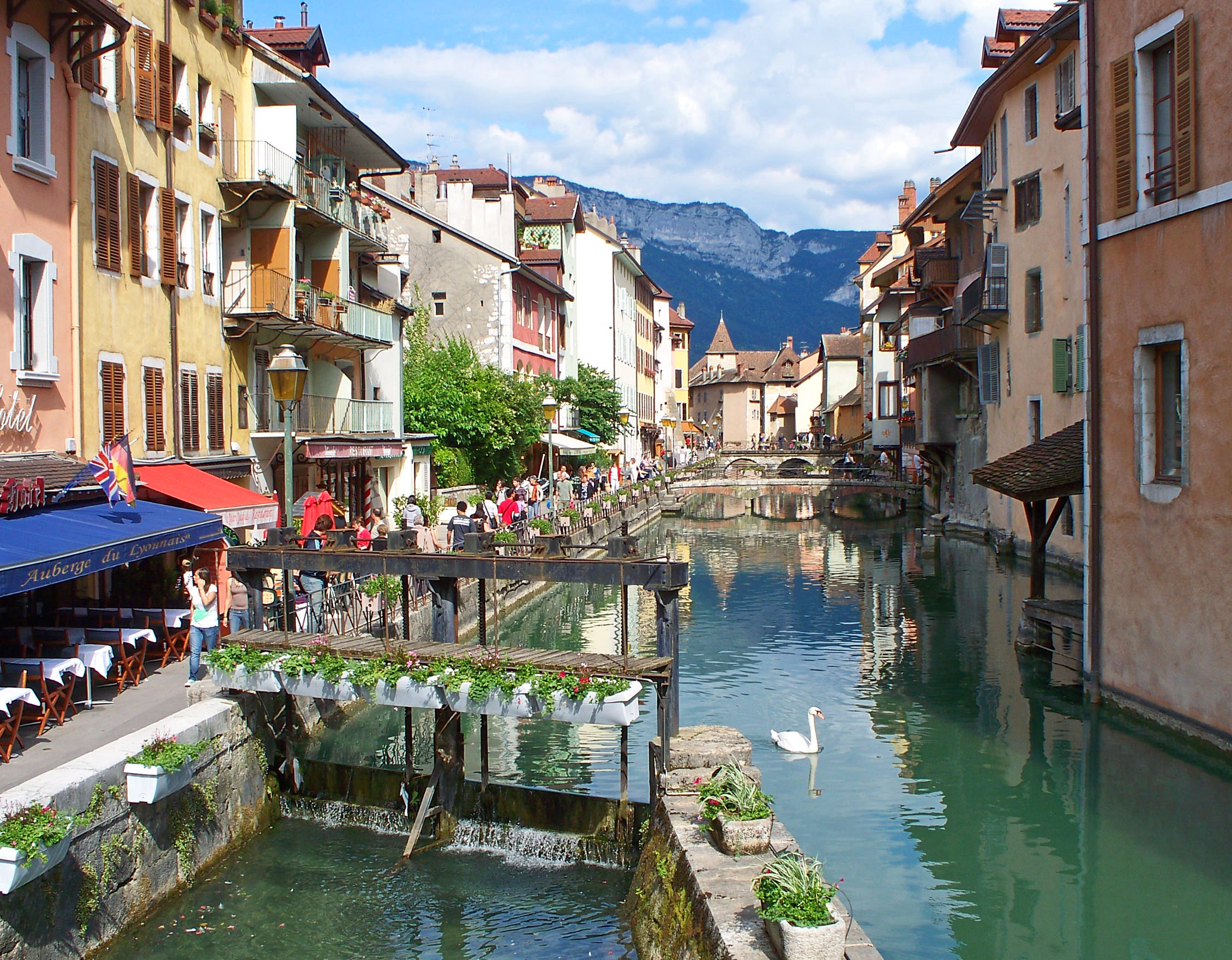
- View of the Thiou flowing through the city of Annecy

- Location within France Location within Auvergne-Rhône-Alpes

Location
- Country: France
- Department: Haute-Savoie
- Municipality: Annecy

Physical characteristics
- Source: Lake Annecy
  - location: Haute-Savoie, France
  - elevation: 446.8 m (1,466 ft)
- Mouth: Fier
  - location: France
  - coordinates: 45°54′34″N 6°5′53″E
- Length: 3.6 km (2.2 mi)

Basin features
- Progression: Fier→ Rhône→ Mediterranean Sea

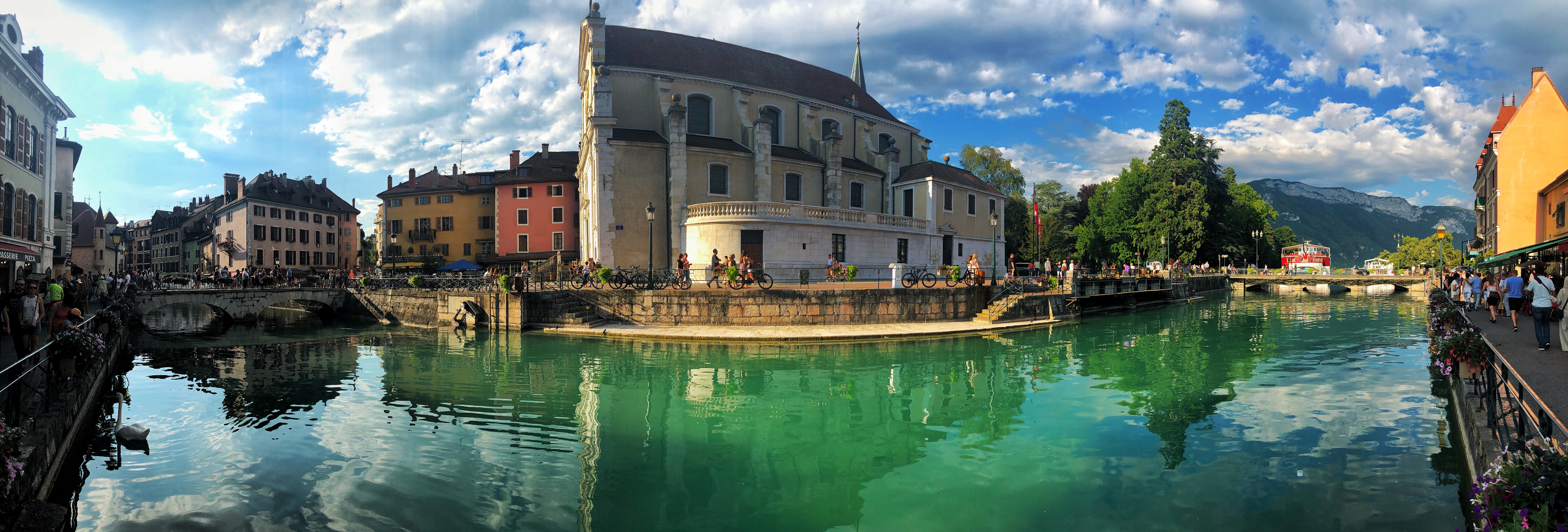
A panoramic image from the southern bank of the Thiou in the town centre of Annecy

The Thiou (French pronunciation: [tju]) is a short river in the city of Annecy, France. It is 3.6 km (2.2 mi) long. It is an effluent of Lake Annecy and an affluent of the Fier, which is in turn a tributary of the Rhône. The Thiou is considered one of the cleanest rivers in Europe and a postcard of the city of Annecy. The Thiou crosses the city forming small canals without which the city would not be often called the Venice of the Alps.

During the nineteenth century, the Thiou played an important role in manufacturing activities and provided the necessary energy to the industries that developed in the city of Annecy.

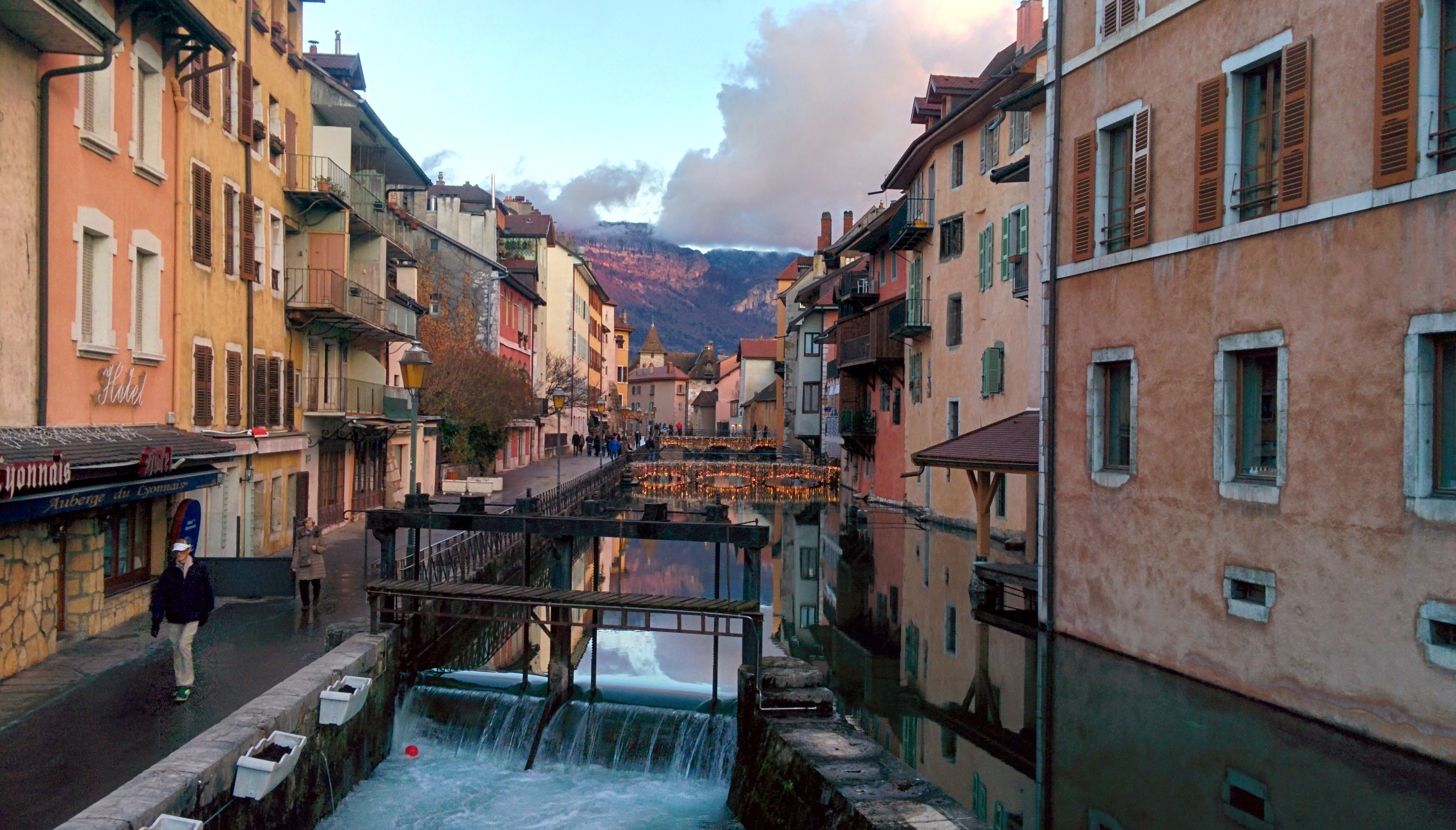
Le Thiou in Winter
