= Coppier family =

The Coppier family is a family from Savoy that was recognized noble in 1565.

== History ==
The first known member of this family was Jean Coppier, notary in Annecy in 1396.

In 1565 two brothers Pierre and Jean Coppier, sons of Pierre Coppier, notary received from the Duke of Savoy letters recognizing the nobility of their ancestors.

Jean Coppier living in 1658 was a cloth merchant. His grandson born in 1741 became doctor of law and lawyer at the Parliament of Savoy.

His son Joseph Coppier was senator of Savoy in 1829 and re-established as noble in 1829 by letter of the King Charles Felix of Savoy.

This family has nothing to do with an old noble family named "de Coppier" or "de Copier" from Dauphiné.

== Heraldry ==
- d'azur à trois coupes d'or

== Bibliography ==
- Gustave Chaix d'Est-Ange, Dictionnaire des familles françaises anciennes ou notables à la fin du XIXe siècle, volume XI, pages 344–345
- comte Amédée de Foras, F. C. de Mareschal, Armorial et nobiliaire de l'ancien duché de Savoie, volume 2, 1878, pages 163-167.
