= Meythet =

Meythet Métè (Savoyard)
- Part of Annecy
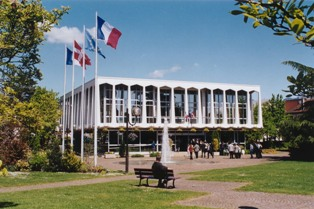
- The town hall in Meythet
- Location of Meythet
- Location within France Location within Auvergne-Rhône-Alpes
- Coordinates: 45°54′56″N 6°05′37″E
- Country: France
- Region: Auvergne-Rhône-Alpes
- Department: Haute-Savoie
- Arrondissement: Annecy
- Canton: Annecy-1
- Commune: Annecy
- Area^{1}: 3.24 km^{2} (1.25 sq mi)
- Highest elevation: 460 m (1,510 ft)
- Lowest elevation: 411 m (1,348 ft)
- Population (2022): 7,997
  - Density: 2,470/km^{2} (6,390/sq mi)
- Demonym: Meythésan / Meythésane
- Time zone: UTC+01:00 (CET)
  - Summer (DST): UTC+02:00 (CEST)
- Postal code: 74960
- Website: www.mairie-meythet.fr
- ^{1} French Land Register data, which excludes lakes, ponds, glaciers > 1 km^{2} (0.386 sq mi or 247 acres) and river estuaries.

Meythet (French pronunciation: [mɛtɛ]; Savoyard: Métè) is a former commune in the Haute-Savoie department in the Auvergne-Rhône-Alpes region in south-eastern France. On 1 January 2017, it was merged into the commune Annecy.

== Geography ==
The Fier forms most of the commune's south-eastern border.

== See also ==
- Communes of the Haute-Savoie department
