= École polytechnique universitaire de Savoie de l'Université de Chambéry =

French engineering College

Coordinates: 45°38′29″N 5°52′9″E

The École Polytechnique d'Ingénieurs de l'Université de Savoie was created in 2006 from the fusion of the École Supérieure d'Ingénieurs - ESIA and the École Supérieure d'Ingénieurs de Chambéry - ESIGEC.
