= Guillaume Perret =

French jazz musician and composer (born 1980)

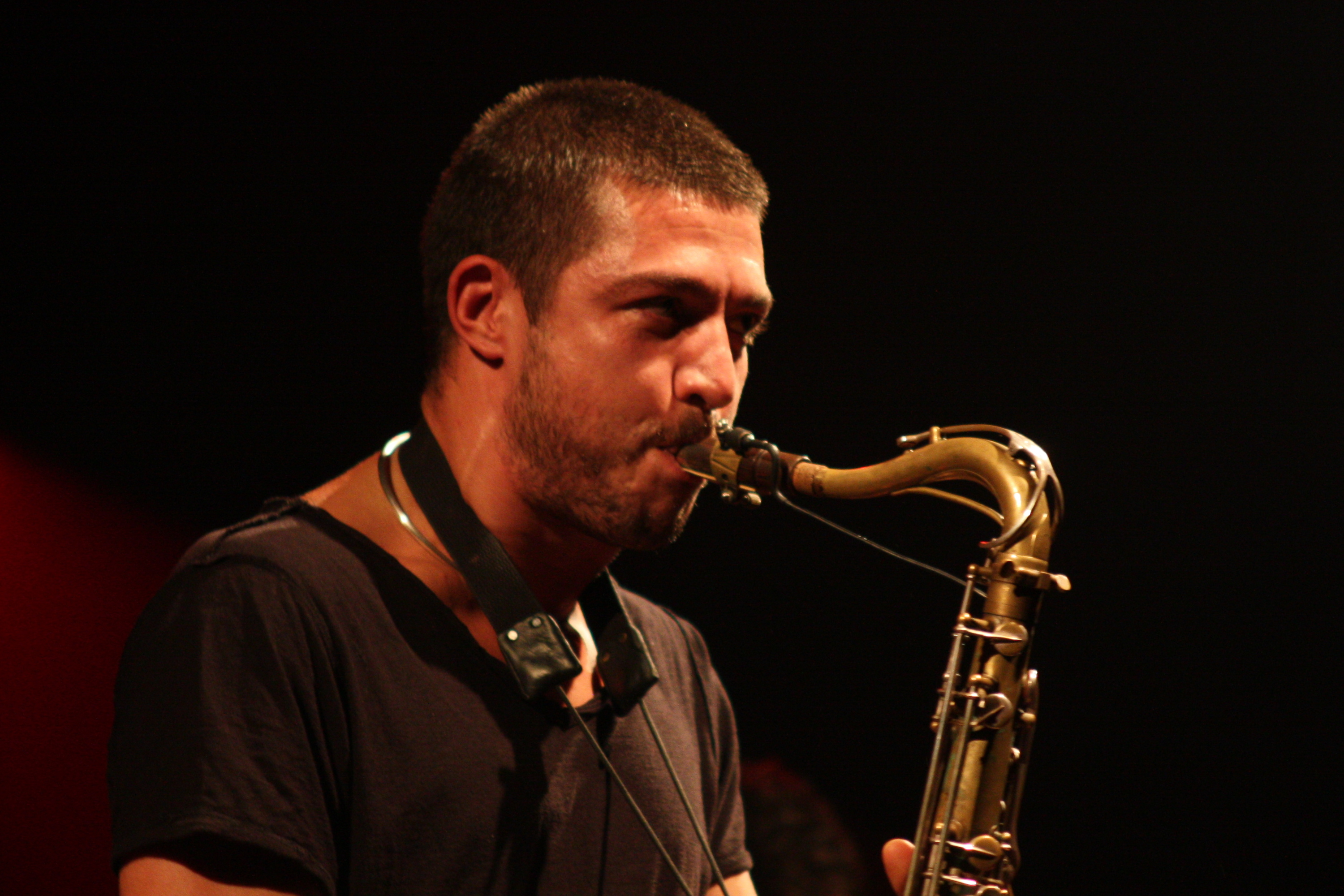
- Guillaume Perret at German Jazz Festival 2013
- Born: 21 June 1980 (age 46); France
- Occupations: Tenor saxophone, soprano saxophone, keyboard player and composer
- Style: Jazz
- Website: www.guillaume-perret.fr

Guillaume Perret (French pronunciation: [ɡijom peʁe]; born 21 June 1980) is a French jazz musician (tenor saxophone and soprano saxophone, also keyboard) and composer.
