= Annecy-le-Vieux =

Annecy-le-Vieux Ènneci l Vyu (Arpitan)
- Part of Annecy
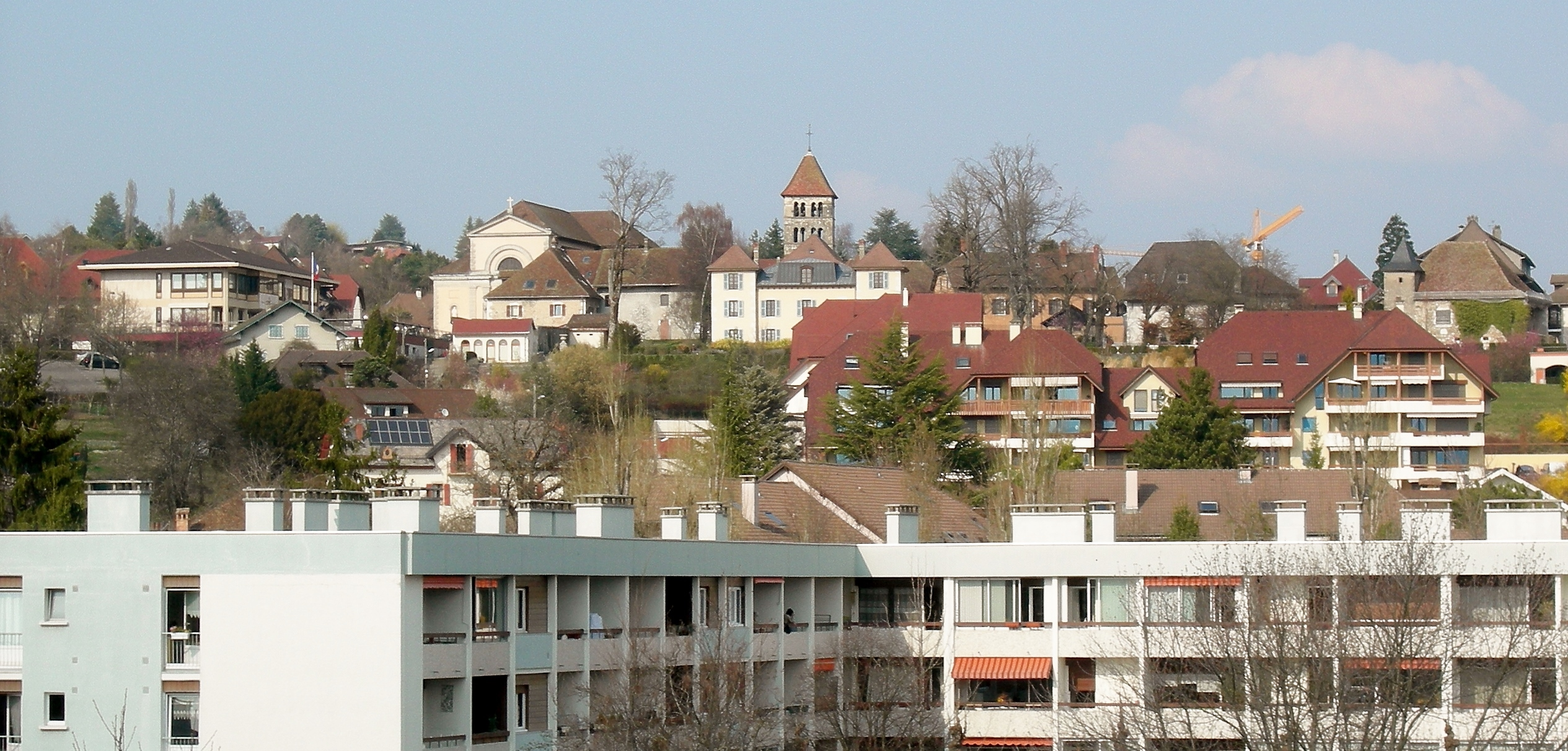
- Panoramic view of Annecy-le-Vieux

- Coat of arms
- Location of Annecy-le-Vieux
- Location within France Location within Auvergne-Rhône-Alpes
- Coordinates: 45°55′12″N 6°08′34″E
- Country: France
- Region: Auvergne-Rhône-Alpes
- Department: Haute-Savoie
- Arrondissement: Annecy
- Canton: Annecy-le-Vieux
- Commune: Annecy
- Area^{1}: 17.02 km^{2} (6.57 sq mi)
- Highest elevation: 1,290 m (4,230 ft)
- Lowest elevation: 420 m (1,380 ft)
- Population (2022): 23,232
  - Density: 1,365/km^{2} (3,535/sq mi)
- Time zone: UTC+01:00 (CET)
  - Summer (DST): UTC+02:00 (CEST)
- Postal code: 74940
- ^{1} French Land Register data, which excludes lakes, ponds, glaciers > 1 km^{2} (0.386 sq mi or 247 acres) and river estuaries.

Annecy-le-Vieux (French pronunciation: [ansi lə vjø]; Arpitan: Ènneci l Vyu) was a former commune in the Haute-Savoie department in the Auvergne-Rhône-Alpes region in southeastern France. On 1 January 2017, it merged into the commune of Annecy.

It was the fourth-largest commune in Haute-Savoie in terms of population, and was located on the northeastern shore of Lake Annecy. It was essentially a residential suburb of Annecy, being less than 3 km from its centre, and was sometimes known at the 16eme arrondissement of Annecy.

The last mayor of Annecy-le-Vieux was Bernard Accoyer, who served from 1989 until December 2016. A doctor by profession, he was also the député of the district and was President of the National Assembly of France from 2007 to 2012.

== Geography ==
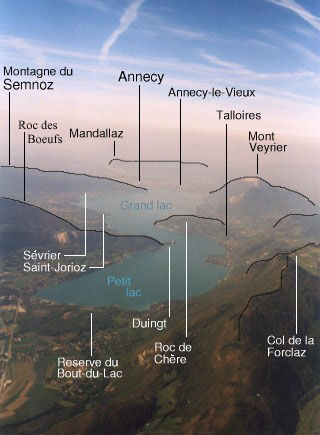
Geographical features around Lake Annecy.

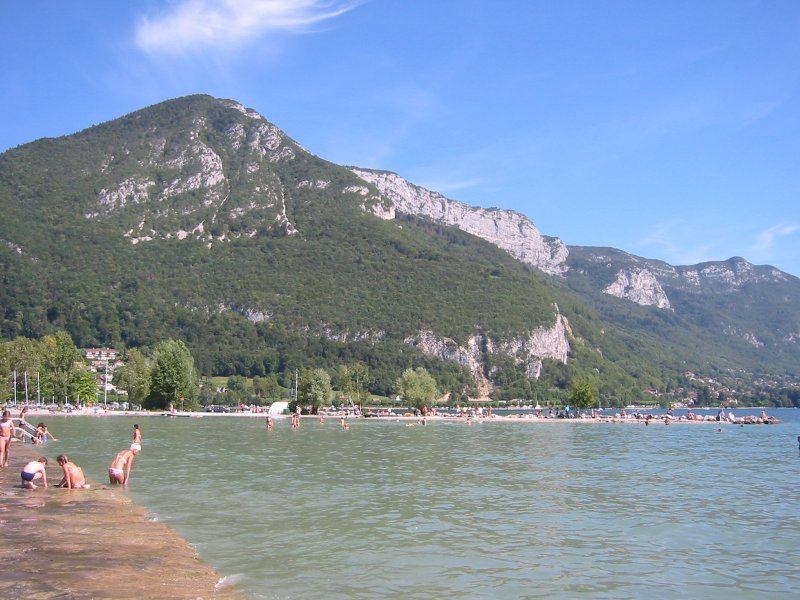
Beach of Albigny.

The commune was 50% urbanised with 33 hectares of public forest, and 50% agricultural and forests.

The commune was located on the foothills of Mount Veyrier (1,291 m), on a moraine at the junction of two old large glaciers.

The Fier forms most of the commune's northern border.

== History ==
The shores of Lake Annecy have been occupied since at least 4000 BCE. A Gallic tribe, the Allobroges, occupied the area in pre-Roman times: the Allobroges were conquered by the Roman legions in 62 BCE. The area was then colonised by Rome, which founded the town of Boutae (later Annecy) in 50 BCE. The town was at a strategic crossroads of three Roman roads across the Alps (to Italy, to Geneva, and to Vienne), and grew rapidly to a population of several thousand. Roman villas are found in the surrounding countryside.

Annecy was attacked by invaders in the post-Roman period, but regained its importance from CE 1107.

Its population grew to 470 inhabitants by 1756. Grape vines for producing wine have been cultivated on the surrounding hills since the Middle Ages. At the end of the 19th century, attacks of mildew and phylloxera almost completely destroyed the grape vines. Wine cultivation was replaced by dairy production.

Various artists lived in the area in the late 19th and early 20th centuries, including Eugène Sue, Adolphe de Custine, John Ruskin and Gabriel Fauré.

Two principal industrial activities arose in the mid-19th century, the Cléchet flour mill and the Paccard Bell Foundry. One of largest bells in the world, "La Savoyarde" which hangs at the Sacré-Cœur in Paris, was cast in Annecy-le-Vieux in 1891. It weighs 18,835 kg, stands 3.06 m tall, has a circumference of 9.60 m, is 22 cm thick at the base, and has a clapper weighing 850 kg.

Annecy included a university site, attached to the Université Savoie Mont Blanc, with more than 4,000 students in 2003. The university offers programs in technology, commercial arts and trades, engineering, and particle physics.

== Tourism ==
Attractions included the beach, boating on Lake Annecy, walking in the hills, including Mount Rampon (957 m), Mont Veyrier (1291 m) and Mount Rampignon (894 m).

Annual events included the Ancilevienne, a 46 km (29 mi) race for teams of runners and cyclists around Lake Annecy, and the Gabriel Fauré music festival.

== Twin towns ==
- Dori, Burkina Faso

== See also ==
- Communes of the Haute-Savoie department
