= Col de Solaison =

Mountain pass in the French Alps

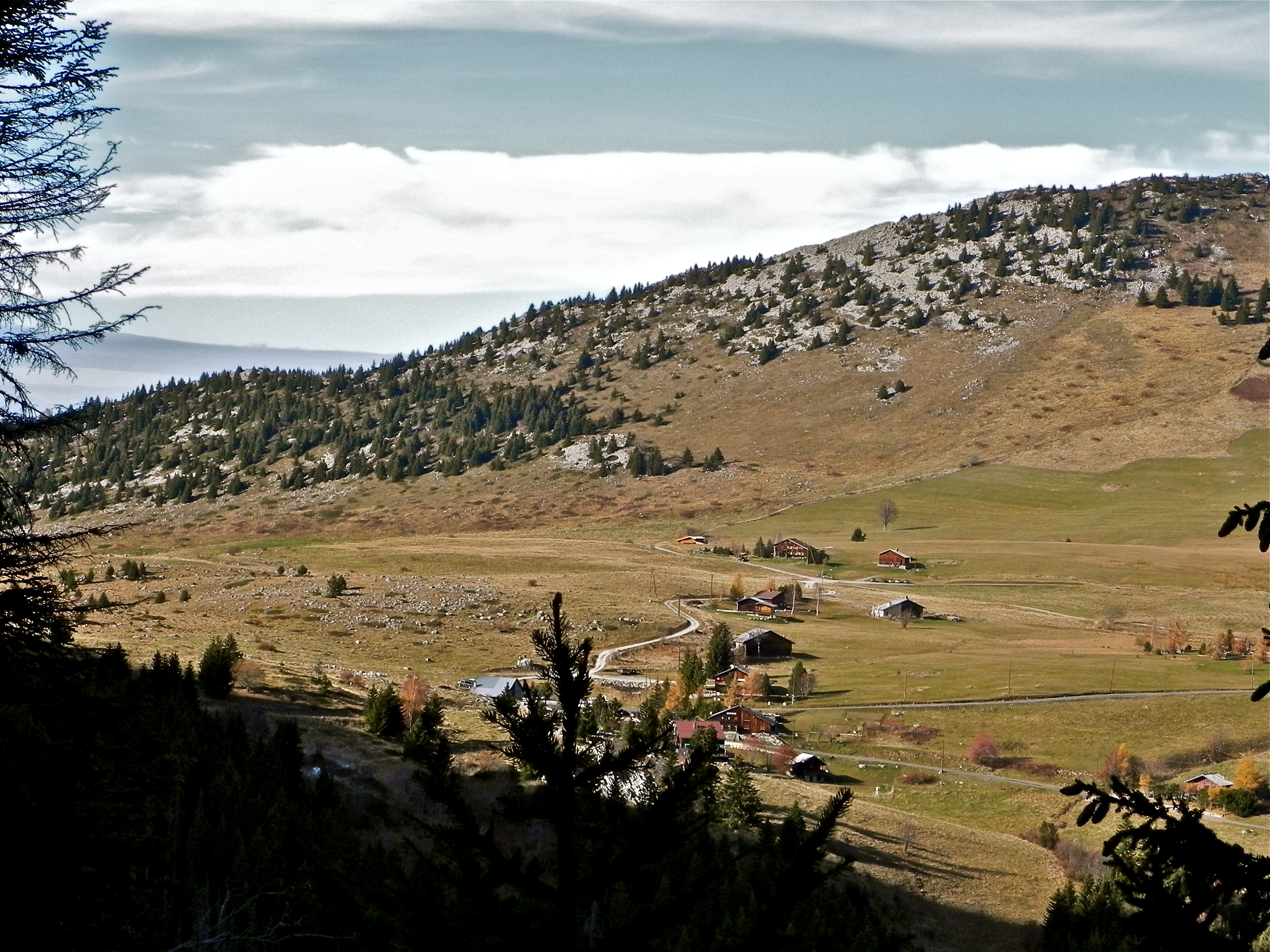
- A view of the Col de Solaison from the southeast, at the foot of the Rochers de Leschaux.

- Location within Alps
- Elevation: 1,507 metres (4,944 ft)
- Traversed by: D186A road

Third Approach
- Location: Haute-Savoie, Auvergne-Rhône-Alpes, France
- Range: Massif des Bornes
- Coordinates: 46°01′55″N 6°25′19″E

The Col de Solaison or Plateau de Solaison is a mountain pass and Nordic skiing area located in the Massif des Bornes of the French Alps, at an average altitude of 1,507 m (4,944 ft), in the territory of the commune of Brizon, Haute-Savoie, France.

== Geography ==
The Col de Solaison is located between the Pointe d'Andey in the north and the Rochers de Leschaux in the south. The area is dominated by pastures and many chalets, between the gorges of Bronze to the east and Borne to the west.

== Sport ==
=== Skiing ===
The Nordic skiing area is within the commune of Brizon, at an altitude of 1,500 m (4,900 ft). The ski area allows the practice of cross-country skiing, snowshoeing and biathlon.

=== Cycling ===
The Col de Solaison was the finish line for Stage 4 of the 2014 Tour de l'Avenir. Kazakh rider Ilya Davidenok won the stage. The climb was classified as first category. It has also served as a stage finish in the Critérium du Dauphiné, this time classified as hors catégorie (HC). It also served as the finish line for final stage of the 2026 Tour Auvergne-Rhône-Alpes, where Isaac del Toro secured the stage and overall victory.

It hosted the Tour de France for the first time in 2026. The climb, classified as HC and labeled as Plateau de Solaison, served as the finish for Stage 15.

Year	Stage	Route	Distance	Stage winner	Yellow jersey	Ref
2026 Tour de France	15	Champagnole to Plateau de Solaison	183.9 km (114.3 mi)	Remco Evenepoel	Tadej Pogačar	
2026 Tour Auvergne-Rhône-Alpes	8	Beaufort to Col de Solaison	120.1km (74.6 mi)	Isaac del Toro	Isaac del Toro	
2022 Critérium du Dauphiné	8	Saint-Alban-Leysse to Col de Solaison	137.5 km (85.4 mi)	Jonas Vingegaard	Primož Roglič	
2017 Critérium du Dauphiné	8	Albertville to Col de Solaison	115 km (71 mi)	Jakob Fuglsang	Jakob Fuglsang	
