= François de Menthon =

French politician (1900–1984)

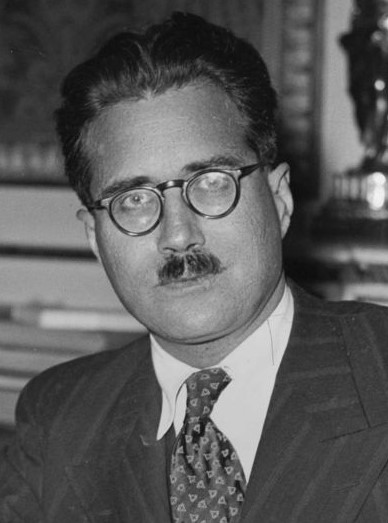
François de Menthon

Count François de Menthon (8 January 1900 – 2 June 1984) was a French politician and professor of law.

== Early and private life ==
Menthon was born in Montmirey-la-Ville in Jura. He was a son of an old noble family from Menthon-Saint-Bernard. He studied law in Dijon, where he joined Action catholique de la Jeunesse française (ACJF). He also studied in Paris. He was president of ACJF from 1927 to 1930, and was also the founder of the Jeunesse ouvrière chrétienne (JOC, a Christian working youth movement). He became a professor of political economy at the University of Nancy. He and his wife Nicole had four sons and two daughters.

== Second World War ==
He was mobilised at the outbreak of the Second World War in 1939, becoming a captain in the French Army. He was severely wounded and captured in June 1940. He spent three months in a hospital in Saint-Dié, but escaped and joined the French Resistance in Haute Savoie in September 1940.

Menthon received Jean Moulin several times at his family's seat at the Château de Menthon-Saint-Bernard. He founded the first resistance cell of the Liberté Resistance movement in Annecy in November 1940, and a second one in Lyon shortly afterwards. He also edited the Liberté underground newspaper, with the first two editions printed in Annecy and later ones in Marseille. He was a leader in the Combat Resistance movement, created by the merger of Liberté with Henri Frenay's Mouvement de Libération Nationale towards the end of 1941. Menthon was captured returning from a meeting with Frenay, and interrogated at Baumettes prison in Marseille, but he was released.

He left France in July 1943 to join General Charles de Gaulle in London, and followed him to Algiers where Menthon served as Commissioner of Justice in the Comité Français de Libération Nationale (CFLNC) from September 1943 to September 1944. He later became a Companion of the Ordre de la Libération, and was also an Officier of the Légion d'Honneur and received the Croix de Guerre.

== Political career ==
After the Liberation of France, Menthon was Minister of Justice in de Gaulle's Provisional Government of the French Republic from 10 September 1944 to 8 May 1945, and then became Attorney General of France. He led the Commission d'Épuration to root out collaborators, and oversaw the trials of Marshal Philippe Pétain and other members of the Vichy regime. He came under attack for the zeal with which the purge was prosecuted, and resigned.

De Gaulle nominated him as the French lead prosecutor at the Nuremberg War Crimes Tribunal. He gave his opening speech, defining a crime against humanity as: "crime contre le statut d'être humain motivé par une idéologie qui est un crime contre l'esprit visant à rejeter l'humanité dans la barbarie" ("crime against human laws, motivated by an ideology that is a crime against the spirit, returning humanity to barbarism"). He resigned in January 1946 to take up active politics and was replaced by Auguste Champetier de Ribes.

Menthon was a founding member of the Mouvement Républicain Populaire (MRP). His political convictions were founded on humanistic and Christian principles. He served as a député for Savoy in the French Assemblée Nationale from 1946 to 1958. He was Minister for the National Economy in Georges Bidault's first ministry, from 24 June to 16 December 1946. He was also involved in European politics, and was president of Parliamentary Assembly of the Council of Europe from 1952 to 1954 (known as the Consultative Assembly until 1974) and was involved in the discussions to choose the design for the Flag of Europe. His promising political career was shortened by disagreements with de Gaulle and he returned to his university career at the University of Nancy in 1958.

He was mayor of Menthon-Saint-Bernard from 1945 to 1977, and served as chairman of the Association des maires et conseiller général for 22 years.

Menthon died in Menthon-Saint-Bernard, in Haute-Savoie.

Political offices
Preceded by Jules Abadie	Minister of Justice; 1943–1945	Succeeded by Pierre-Henri Teitgen
Preceded by Paul-Henri Spaak	President of the Parliamentary Assembly of the Council of Europe; 1951–1954	Succeeded by Guy Mollet
