= Roc de Chère National Nature Reserve =

Protected area in France

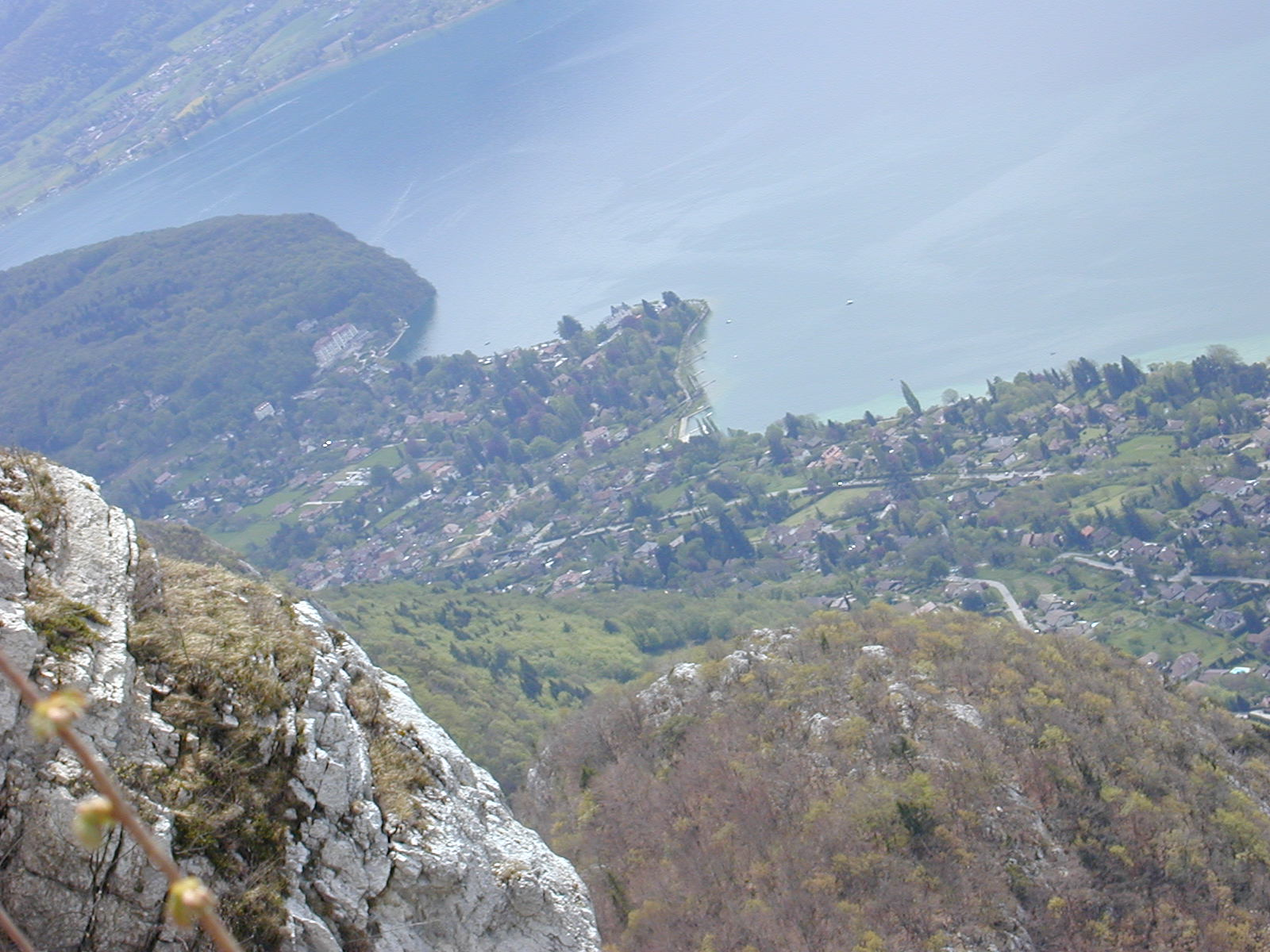
- The Roc du Chère above the commune of Menthon-Saint-Bernard and Lake Annecy
- Interactive map of Roc de Chère National Nature Reserve
- Location: Haute-Savoie, Rhone-Alpes, France
- Coordinates: 45°50′40″N 6°12′16″E
- Area: .69 km^{2} (0.27 sq mi)

The Roc de Chère National Nature Reserve is a major ecologic site in southeastern France. A protected nature reserve since 1977, it covers a small area of 69 hectares (170 acres). It is located near the commune of Talloires, on the eastern bank of Lake Annecy at an elevation of 448 metres (1,470 ft). The Roc de Chère is a small mountain, culminating at a modest 651 metres (2,136 ft), which was formed by a quaternary glacier from the south.

== Etymology ==
The word Chère comes from the pre-Indo-European root *car-, which was used to designate a stony material, a rock. This significance is not entirely understood, hence Chère became a proper noun and "Roc" (modern French for rock) was added and is not considered a pleonastic reinforcement.

== Geography, morphology and history ==
The reserve is located between the communes of Talloires and Menthon-Saint-Bernard. There are numerous trails along the rock that offer superb panoramas overlooking Lake Annecy. The rock plunges down towards Annecy via impressive cliffs 50 to 70 metres (160 to 230 ft) tall. From atop one can see the lapiaz, calcareous rocks eroded by water that are also found in Savoie.

Formerly logged for timber by the monks from the Abbey of Talloires, the reserve nowadays is mostly covered by Sessile oak and hornbeams. A nature reserve was created in 1978 due to the exceptional biodiversity of the site. 35% of the surface area in 2004 belonged to the Conservatoire du littoral et des rivages lacustres, an academy which deals with littoral zones and lake shores. There is a golf course on its northern slopes.

As a result of differing calcareous and siliceous soils (sandstone), there are separate microclimates from one valley to another, supporting more than 560 plant species. Among them they include:

- Plants that are relics of the glacier era (lichens, Carex limosa, etc.)
- Plants that are typical of the subalpine elevation (Rhododendron, Lycopode sélagine, etc.)
- Plants belong to submediterranean communities (such as Acer monspessulanum, Rubia tinctorum)

Glaciers have left a peat bog where one can find Drosera, mud sedge (Carex limosa), and the northern emerald (Somatochlora arctica), an insect in the order of Odonata. In a canyon hidden under the forest, one can find plants that are able to grow up to elevations of 2,000 metres (6,600 ft) (Rhododendron ferrugineum, Lycopode sélagine). On the other hand, on the lakeside cliffs in the hot and dry microclimate southern species (such as Acer monspessulanum) have acclimatized and established.

A large wildlife population has also found refuge in the reserve. Among the birds one can find the Eurasian crag martin and peregrine falcon that nest in the cliffs, as well as the black kite and yellow-legged gulls.

On Sunday 21 June 2009 at 2:30 in the morning, three young men were killed and two seriously injured after their motor boat ran into a Roc de Chère cliff at full speed after returning from a nightclub in Annecy.

== Touristic interest ==
The tomb of the French philosopher and historian Hippolyte Taine is in the reserve.
