= Château de Menthon-Saint-Bernard =

French historic castle

- Menthon-Saint-Bernard
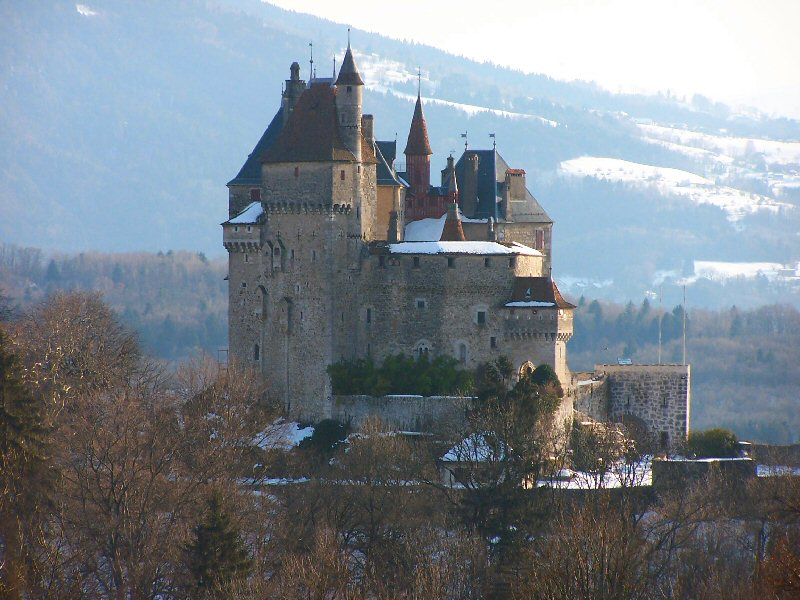

Site information
- Open to the public: Yes

Location
- Coordinates: 45.8641667°N 6.2036111°E

The Château de Menthon is a medieval castle located in the commune of Menthon-Saint-Bernard, 12 kilometres (7.5 mi) south of Annecy in the Haute-Savoie department of France. Standing on a 200 metres (660 ft) tall rock, its stone towers loom over Lake Annecy, the Roc de Chère National Nature Reserve, and Menthon-Saint-Bernard. Since 1989, it has been listed as a monument historique by the French Ministry of Culture.

== History ==
The first fortress was erected in the 10th century, around 923; it was originally a simple wooden guard post, built on a promontory dominating the ancient Roman road and Lake Annecy. The present buildings were constructed between the 13th and 19th centuries.

Bernard of Menthon (St Bernard), the patron saint of skiers, was born in the castle in the 11th century (1008). He later founded the hospice at the Great St. Bernard Pass and abbeys in the high mountains.

From 1180 on, the castle has been occupied by the Menthon family. The origin of the family is uncertain but they came from Burgundy and acquired a degree of feudal power. After their arrival, they constructed the three big square towers.

In the 15th century, Nicod de Menthon was ambassador to France of the Duke Amédée de Savoie, then Governor of Nice and admiral of the naval fleet sent by the Council of Florence to Constantinople.

During the Renaissance, the medieval fortress was transformed into a sumptuous residence, seat of the Barony of Menthon. Apartments took the place of the round walk between the towers and the Menthon family bought a large quantity of furniture.

The general appearance of the castle was unchanged until 1740, when several alterations were carried out to increase comfort. A suite of spacious light rooms was added onto the side facing the lake, comprising the dining room and the grand hall of 100 square metres (1,100 ft^{2}) giving a view of the lake from its four windows.

In the 19th century, between 1860 and 1890, the castle was restyled (consolidation, raising of walls, adding of turrets, creation of a half-timbered gallery in the inner courtyard). by the count, René de Menthon, a fervent disciple of Viollet-le-Duc, who gave the château the appearance it has today.

François de Menthon, father of the present count, was a lawyer and member of the Resistance who represented France at the Nuremberg Trials. He worked for the creation of a united Europe and was Minister of Justice under De Gaulle.

== Tourism ==
The castle has 105 rooms on four levels and spreads over several hundred square metres. Visitors can admire beautifully furnished rooms, in particular the Countess's Bedroom, 13th century kitchens and the great hall, admirably decorated with pictures and antique furniture dated between the 16th and 19th centuries, Louis XIII and Louis XIV furniture, a Gobelins tapestry from 1730 and others from Aubusson.

The library contains more than 12,000 works from before 1800, including incunabula and ancient manuscripts written on parchment, sheepskin or goatskin, with painted illuminations from monks of the Middle Ages. The bulk of the books date from the 16th, 17th and 18th centuries.

The castle is open from May to September. In summer, the visit is augmented by a troop of actors who relive the past of the castle. Each year there are some 40,000 visitors.

In 2008, for the anniversary of the birth of Bernard of Menthon, special commemorations were organized.

== See also ==
- List of castles in France

== Sources ==
- Serveur Savoie: The Château of Menthon St-Bernard
