= Dents de Lanfon =

Mountain in Haute-Savoie, France

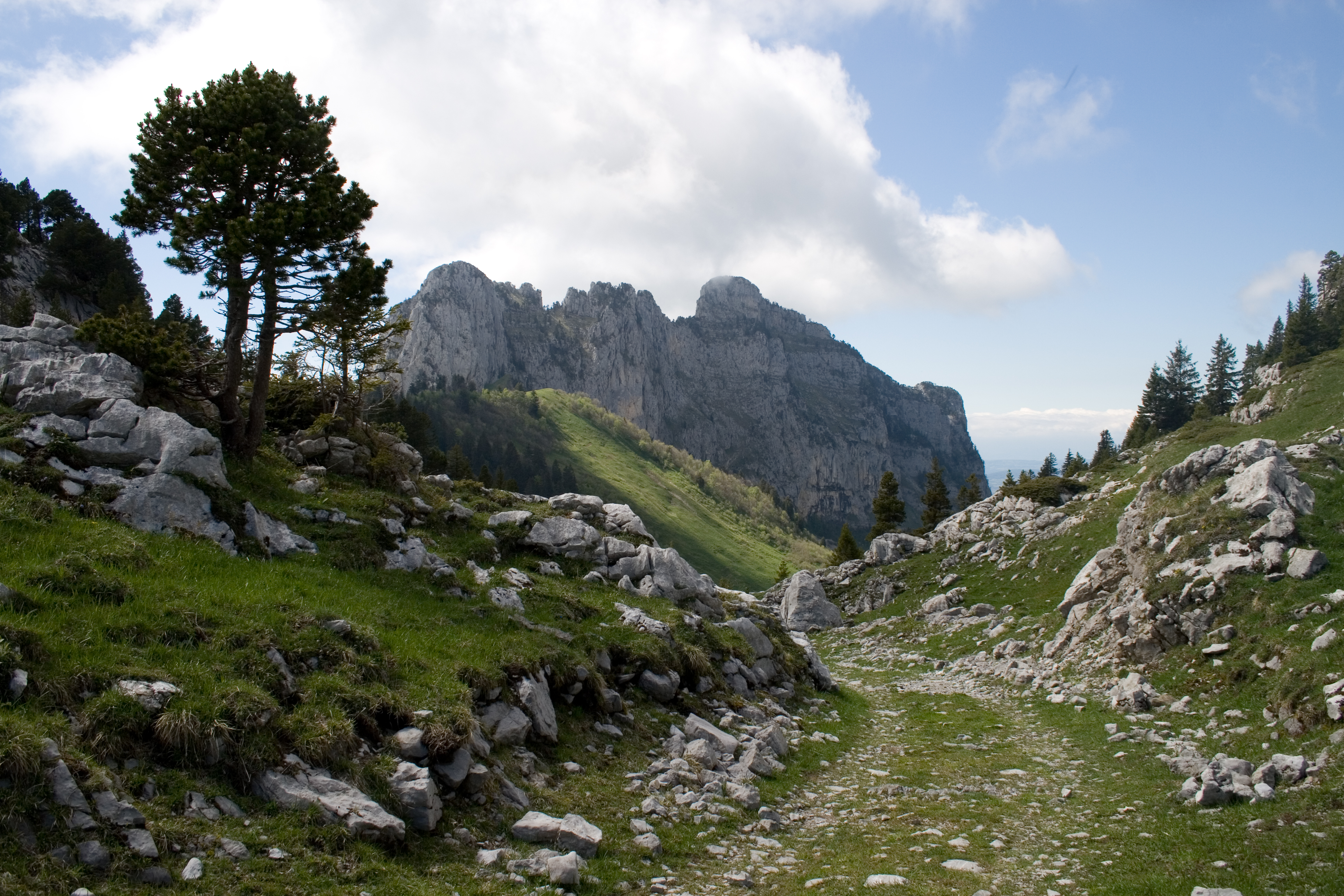

Highest point
- Elevation: 1,824 m (5,984 ft)
- Coordinates: 45°51′40″N 06°14′30″E

Naming
- English translation: Teeth of Lanfon
- Language of name: French

Geography
- Location within Alps Location within France
- Location: Haute-Savoie, France
- Parent range: Bornes Massif

The Dents de Lanfon (French pronunciation: [dɑ̃ d(ə) lɑ̃fɔ̃]; 'Teeth of Lanfon') is a mountain in south-eastern France rising to 1824 m. Situated above Talloires on the east bank of Lac d'Annecy in Haute-Savoie. It is framed by mount Veyrier (1,291 m) to the north, and by Le Lanfonnet (1768 m.) and La Tournette (2,351 m) to the south.

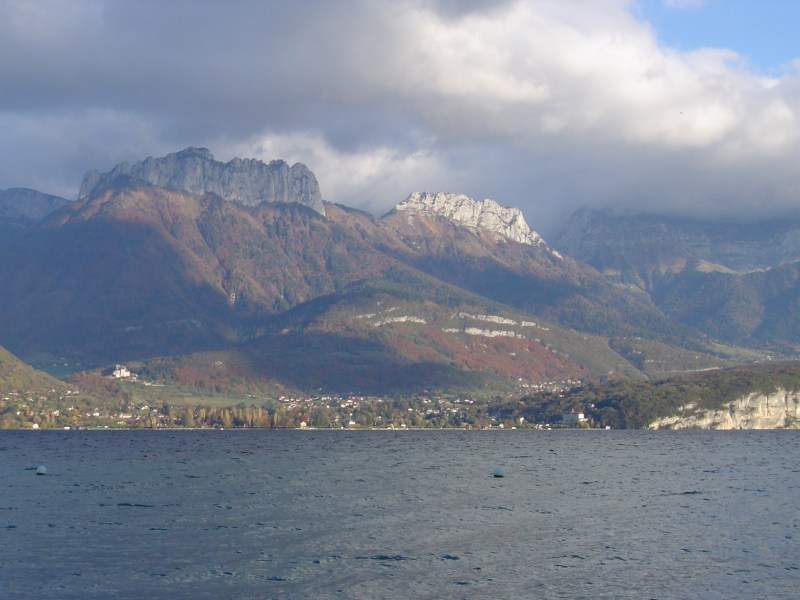
The Dents de Lanfon (left) viewed from Lac d'Annecy with Lanfonnet (right)

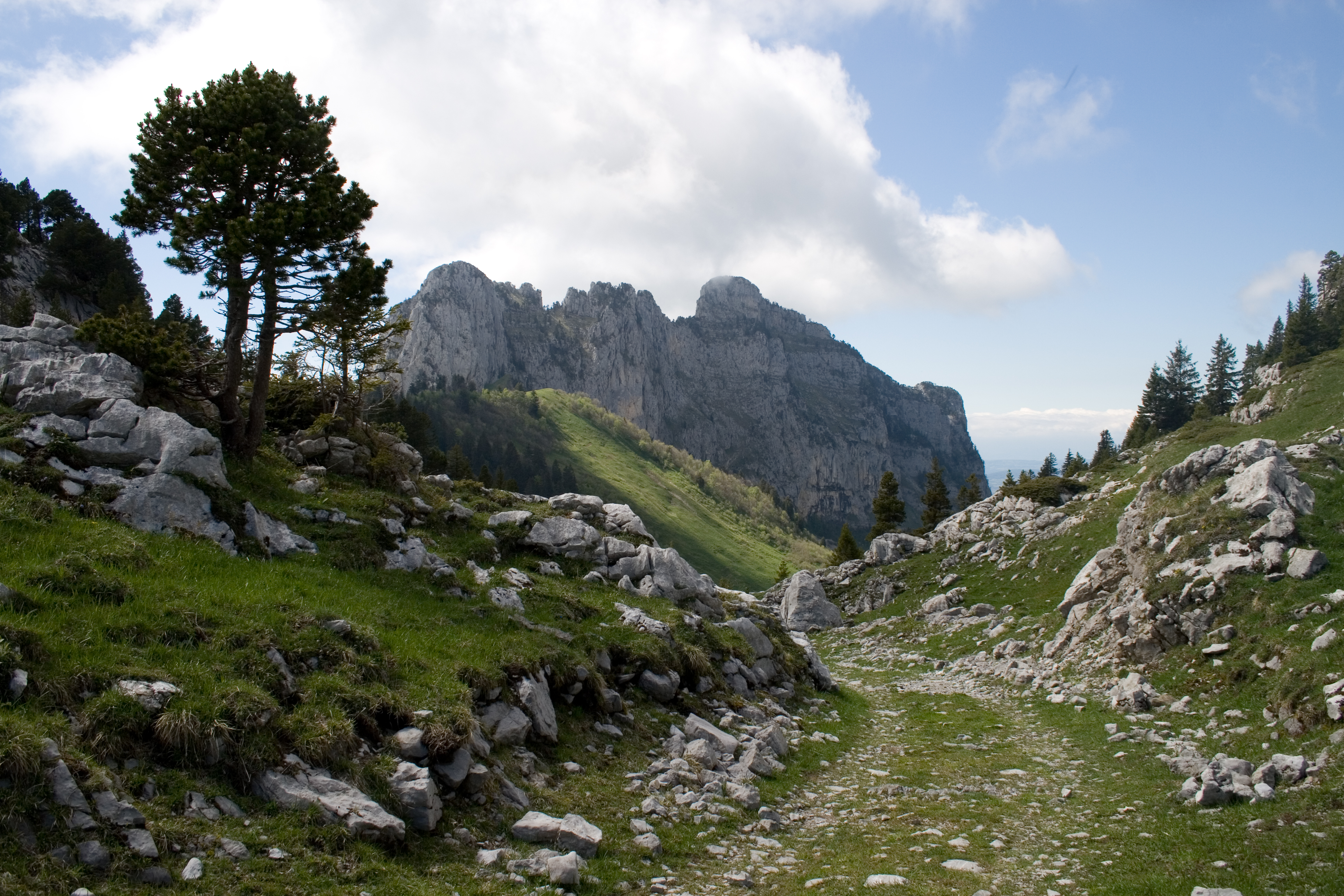
North face of the Dents de Lanfon

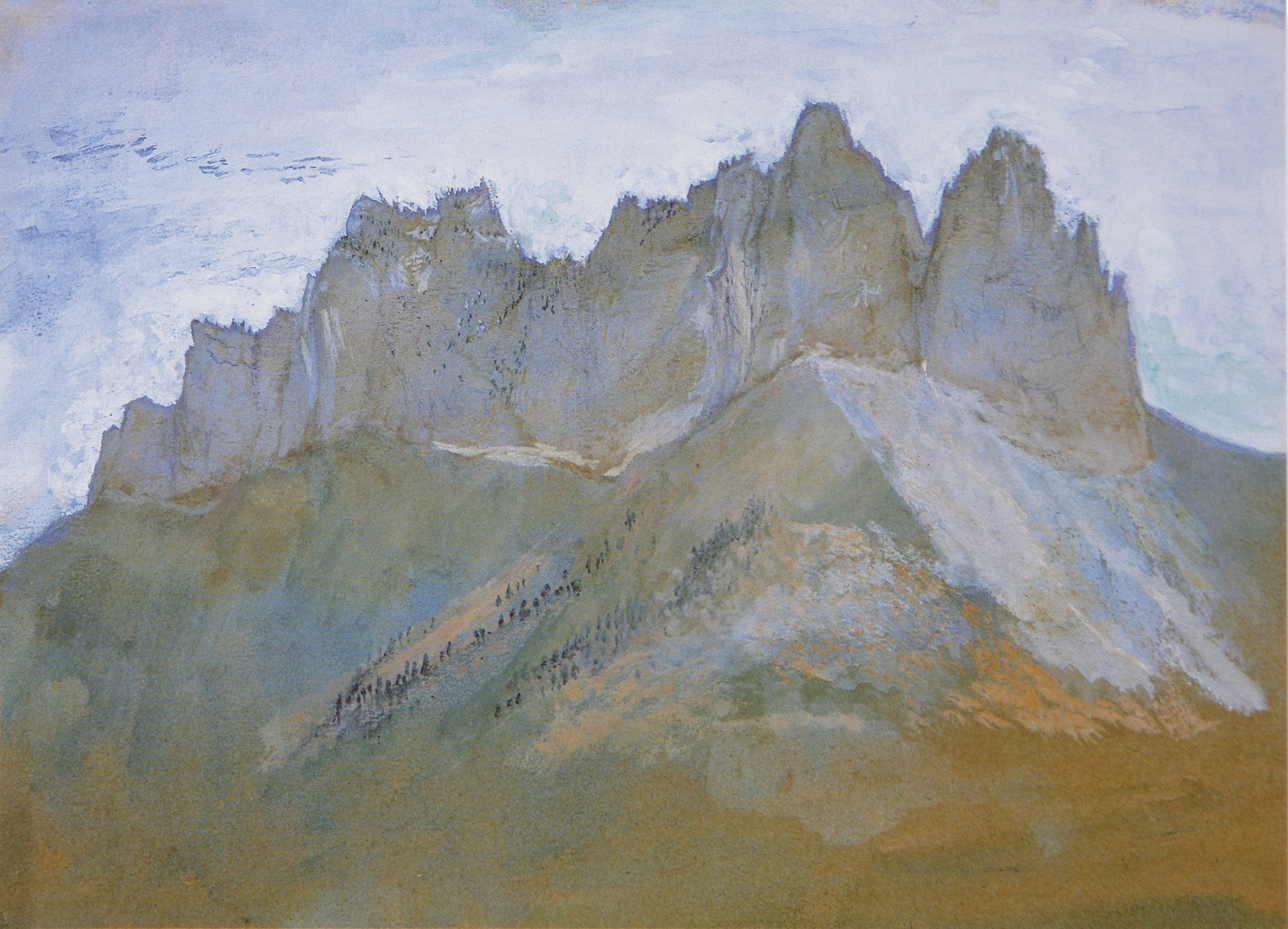
Rochers de Lanfon, by John Ruskin
