= Millardet =

Millardet is a French surname. Notable people with the surname include:

- Patricia Millardet (1957–2020), French actress
- Pierre-Marie-Alexis Millardet (1838–1902), French botanist and mycologist
