= Pic de Jallouvre =

Mountain of the French Prealps

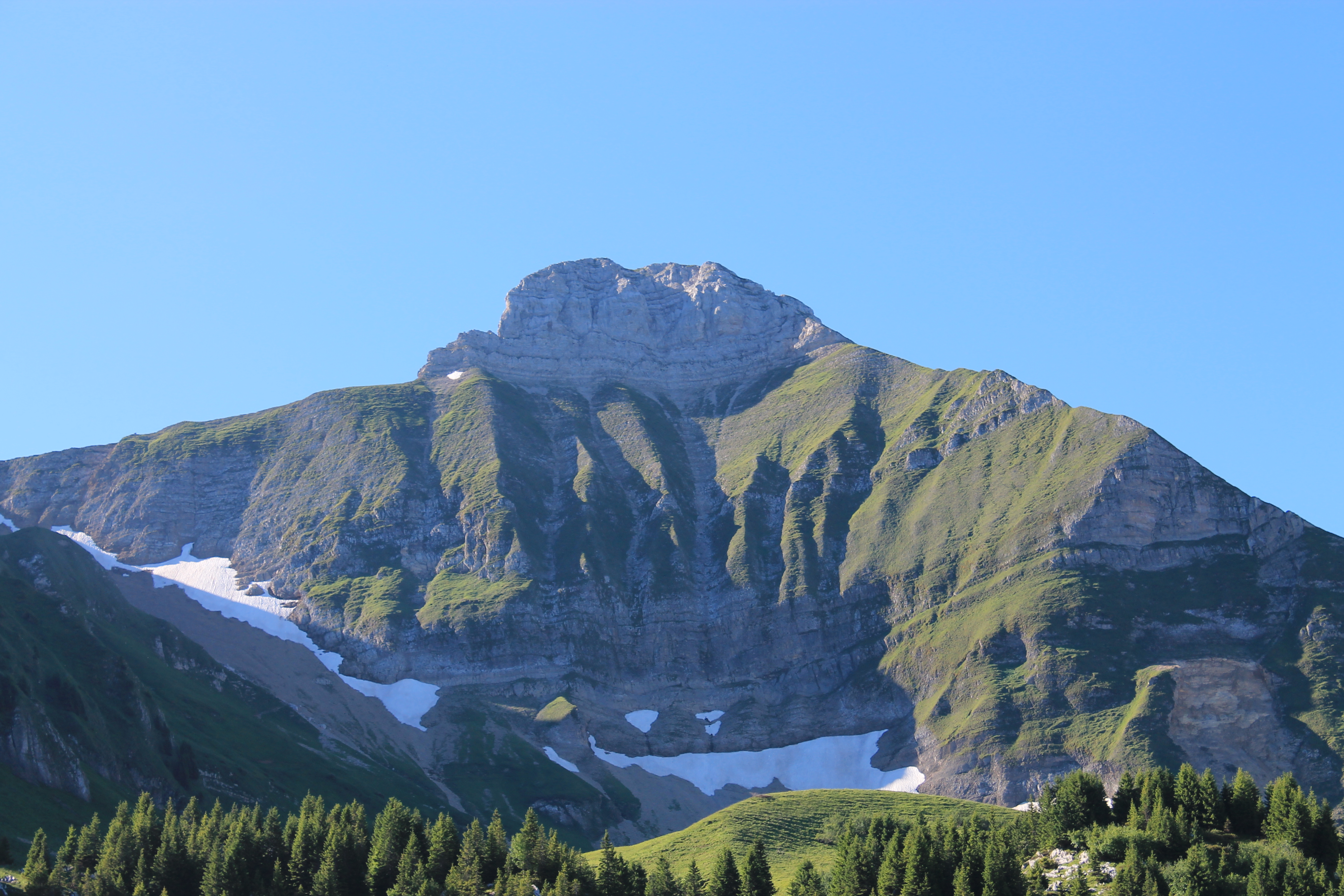
- The Pic de Jallouvre

Highest point
- Elevation: 2,438 m (7,999 ft)
- Prominence: 825 m (2,707 ft)
- Coordinates: 45°59′45″N 06°27′08″E

Geography
- Location within Alps
- Location: Haute-Savoie, France
- Parent range: Bornes Massif

Pic de Jallouvre (French pronunciation: [pik də ʒaluvʁ]) is a mountain of Haute-Savoie, France. It is the highest mountain in the Bornes Massif range of the French Prealps and its highest point, the Pointe Blanche, has an elevation of 2438 metres.
