= Pierre-Marie-Alexis Millardet =

French botanist and mycologist (1838–1902)

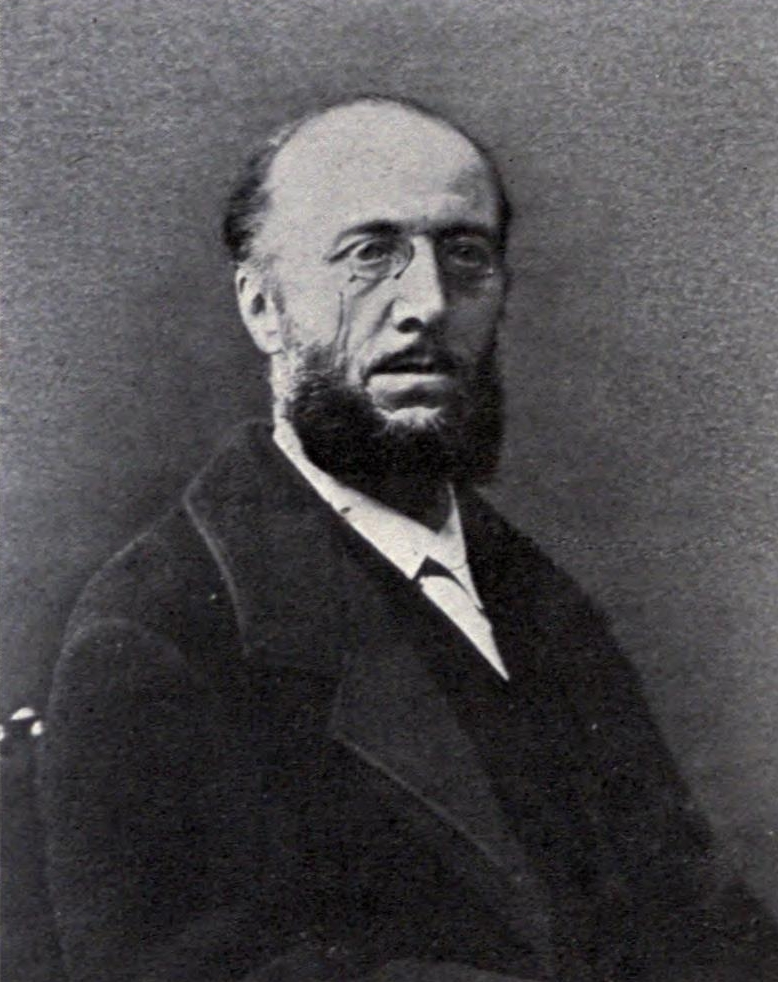
- Pierre-Marie-Alexis Millardet
- Born: 13 December 1838; Montmirey-la-Ville, France
- Died: 15 December 1902 (aged 64); Bordeaux, France
- Education: Heidelberg; Freiberg
- Known for: Phylloxera
- Awards: 1893 Prix Morogues
- Scientific career
- Fields: botany and mycology
- Workplaces: Strasbourg

Pierre-Marie-Alexis Millardet (13 December 1838 – 15 December 1902) was a French botanist and mycologist born in Montmirey-la-Ville.

He was a student at the Universities of Heidelberg and Freiberg, and later became a professor of botany at the Universities of Strasbourg (1869), Nancy (1872), and Bordeaux (1876). Millardet is chiefly remembered for his work dealing with plant pests. In the 1860s the vineyards of France were infested by the destructive Phylloxera, an aphid-like pest inadvertently introduced to Europe from the United States. Millardet and fellow botanist Jules Émile Planchon (1823–1888) controlled the infestation by using American grape vines that were resistant to Phylloxera as grafting stock. American horticulturalist, T.V. Munson, was instrumental in identifying and provisioning the American rootstock that was resistant to Phylloxera and suitable for French growing conditions.

He was also responsible for protecting grape vineyards from downy mildew fungus (Plasmopara viticola). He accomplished this feat by implementing a fungicide consisting of hydrated lime, copper sulfate and water, a mixture that was to become known as the "Bordeaux mixture". It was the first fungicide to be used worldwide and is still used today.

== Writings ==
- Monographie sur la croissance de la vigne et la technique d'hybridation artificielle. - Monograph on vine growth and artificial hybridization technique.
- Un porte-greffe pour les terrains crayeux et marneux les plus chlorosant. - Rootstock for chalky terrain and marl for chlorosis.
- Notes sur les vignes américaines et opuscules divers sur le même sujet. - Notes on American vines and various pamphlets on the same subject.
- Pourridié et Phylloxéra. Etude comparative de ces deux maladies de la vigne, 1882 - Phylloxera and rot. Comparative study of these two diseases of the vine.
- Histoire des principales variétés et espèces de vignes d'origine américaine qui résistent au phylloxera, (1885) - History of the main varieties and species of American grapes that are resistant to phylloxera.

== Sources ==
- This article is based on a translation of equivalent articles from the French and German Wikipedia.
- Dixon, Bernard (Sep 2004). "Pushing Bordeaux mixture". The Lancet Infectious Diseases. 4 (9). United States: 594. doi:10.1016/S1473-3099(04)01136-3. ISSN 1473-3099. PMID 15336227.
- "Мильярде, Пьер-Мари-Алексис" . Brockhaus and Efron Encyclopedic Dictionary (in Russian). 1906.
