= Mont Veyrier =

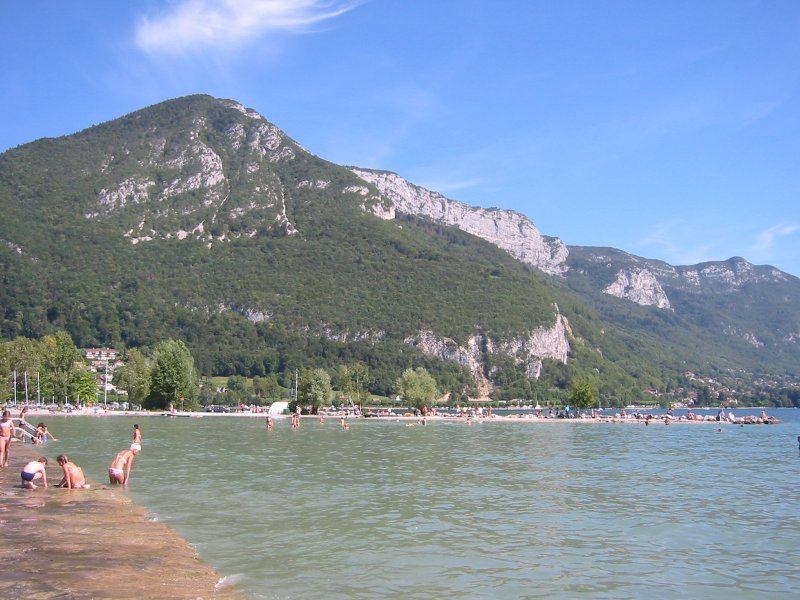
- Mount Veyrier, viewed from the Imperial Palace in Annecy.

Highest point
- Elevation: 1,291 m (4,236 ft)
- Coordinates: 45°54′02″N 06°10′57″E

Geography
- Location within France
- Location: Haute-Savoie, France
- Parent range: Bornes Massif

Mont Veyrier (French pronunciation: [mɔ̃ vɛʁje]) is a mountain located in the French Alps, in Haute Savoie. It culminates at 1,291 metres (4,236 ft), and dominates the east side of Lake Annecy.
