= Bornes Massif =

Mountain in France

Coordinates: 45°59′56″N 6°27′36″E

The Bornes Massif (French: Massif des Bornes, pronounced [masif de bɔʁn]) are a mountainous massif in the north French Prealps in the department of Haute-Savoie. It has 20 peaks higher than 2000 m and is a popular destination for winter sports. The massif is the source of the celebrated cheese Reblochon.

== Geography ==
=== Location ===
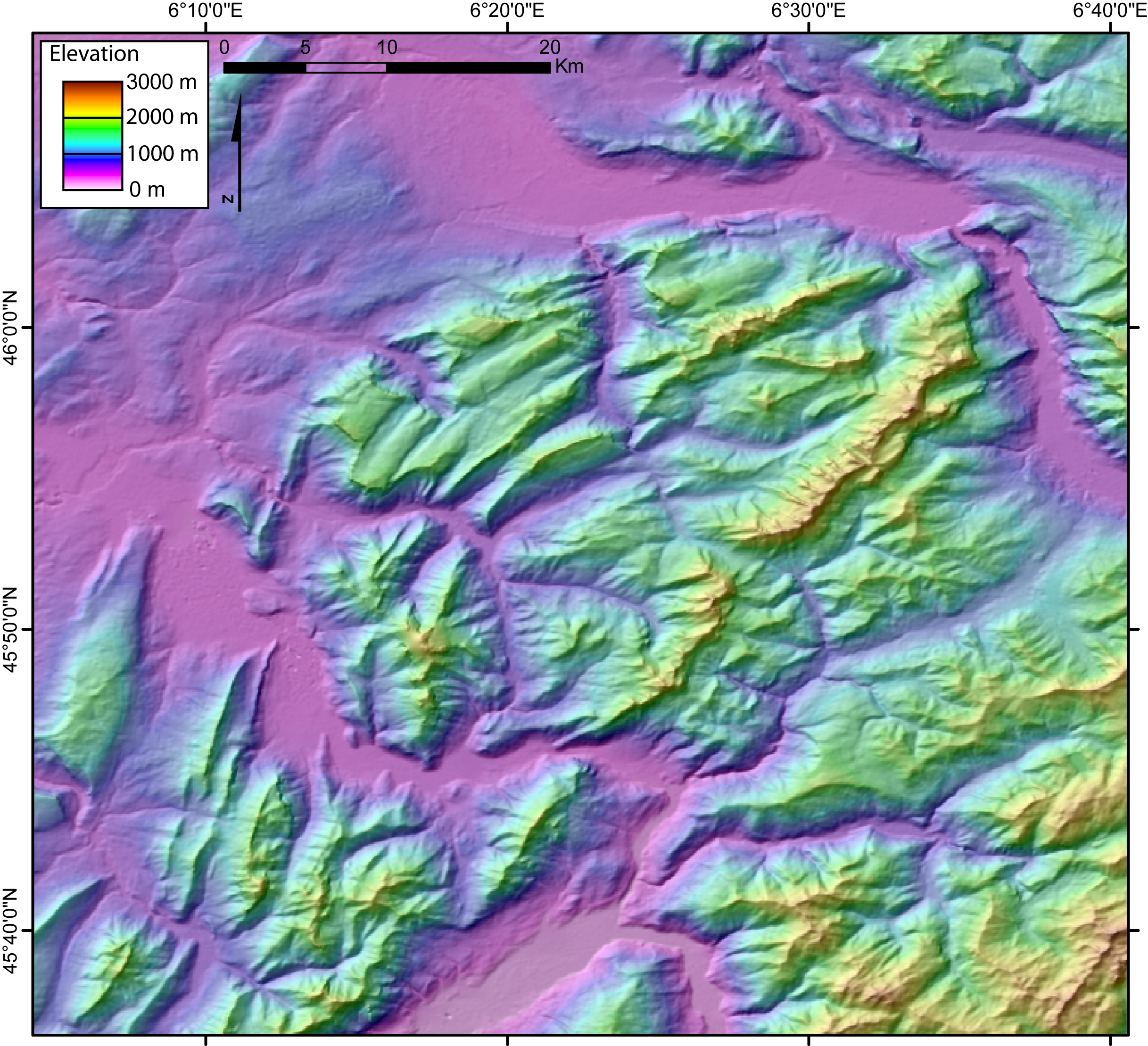
Digital elevation model of the Bornes Massif

The massif is bounded on the east by the Thônes depression and the Aravis Range, where the highest peaks of the Northern Prealps are to be found, to the south-west by Lake Annecy and the Bauges Massif, and to the north by the valley of Arve and Chablais. The name "Aravis Massif" is also used to refer to the whole massif, possibly an effect of tourist marketing.

The massif can be accessed though numerous open valleys which separate the massif's peaks:

- From Annecy via the Bluffy col (631 m) or via the recently widened Dingy-Saint-Clair pass, both of which lead to Thônes,
- From Bonneville via the Borne gorge which leads to Saint-Jean-de-Sixt,
- From the east (Megève) via the Aravis col (1486 m, with a view of Mont Blanc) which leads to La Clusaz,
- From Cluses to the north-east via the col de la Colombière, closed in winter, which leads to Le Grand-Bornand,
- From the south (Faverges, Ugine) via the Marais col (843 m) which leads to Thônes.

Two important rivers traverse the massif:

- The Fier from Mont Charvin in the Aravis at Annecy passing by Thônes, the crossroads of the valleys,
- The Borne de la Pointe-Percée at Bonneville which flows into the Arve, passing by le Grand-Bornand and le Petit-Bornand.

=== Summits ===
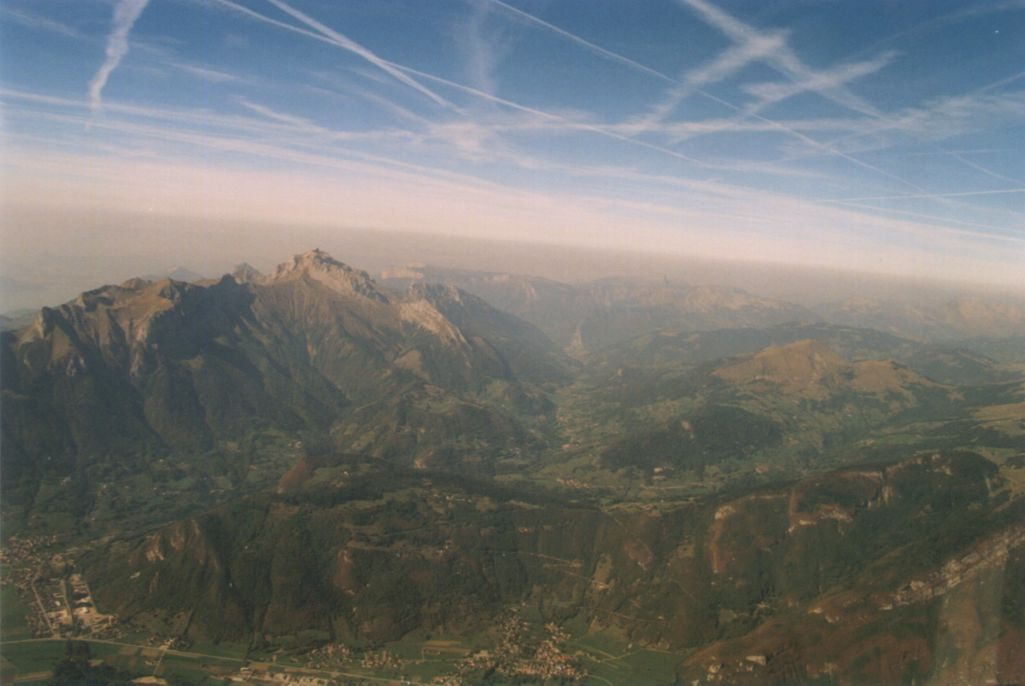
View from the south of the west side of the massif.

Main summits of the massif, outside those from the Aravis range:

- Pointe Blanche, 2,438 m (7,999 ft), highest point in the massif, part of the Bargy range
- Pic de Jallouvre, 2,408 m (7,900 ft) part of the Bargy range
- Pointe du midi, 2,364 m (7,756 ft) Bargy range
- La Tournette, 2,351 m (7,713 ft) good view from Annecy lake
- Grand Bargy, 2,301 m (7,549 ft)
- Pointe de Balafrasse, 2,296 m (7,533 ft)
- Pointe Dzérat (or pointe Est du Midi), 2,278 m (7,474 ft)
- Pointe d'Almet, 2,232 m (7,323 ft)
- Pointe de la Grande Combe, 2,210 m (7,250 ft)
- Petit Bargy, 2,098 m (6,883 ft)
- le Buclon, 2,072 m (6,798 ft)
- la Cime de Février, 2,056 m (6,745 ft)
- Mount Lachat de Châtillon, 2,050 m (6,730 ft) (below le Grand-Bornand)
- l'Aiguille verte, 2,045 m (6,709 ft)
- Pointe de la Beccaz, 2,041 m (6,696 ft)
- le Crêt des Mouches, 2,033 m (6,670 ft)
- Mont Lachat, 2,023 m (6,637 ft) (north Thônes)
- Pointe de Deux Heures, 2,018 m (6,621 ft)
- Pointe de Banc Fleuri, 2,009 m (6,591 ft)
- la Montagne de Sous-Dine, 2,004 m (6,575 ft)
- Pointe d'Andey, 1,877 m (6,158 ft)
- Mont Veyrier, 1,291 m (4,236 ft)

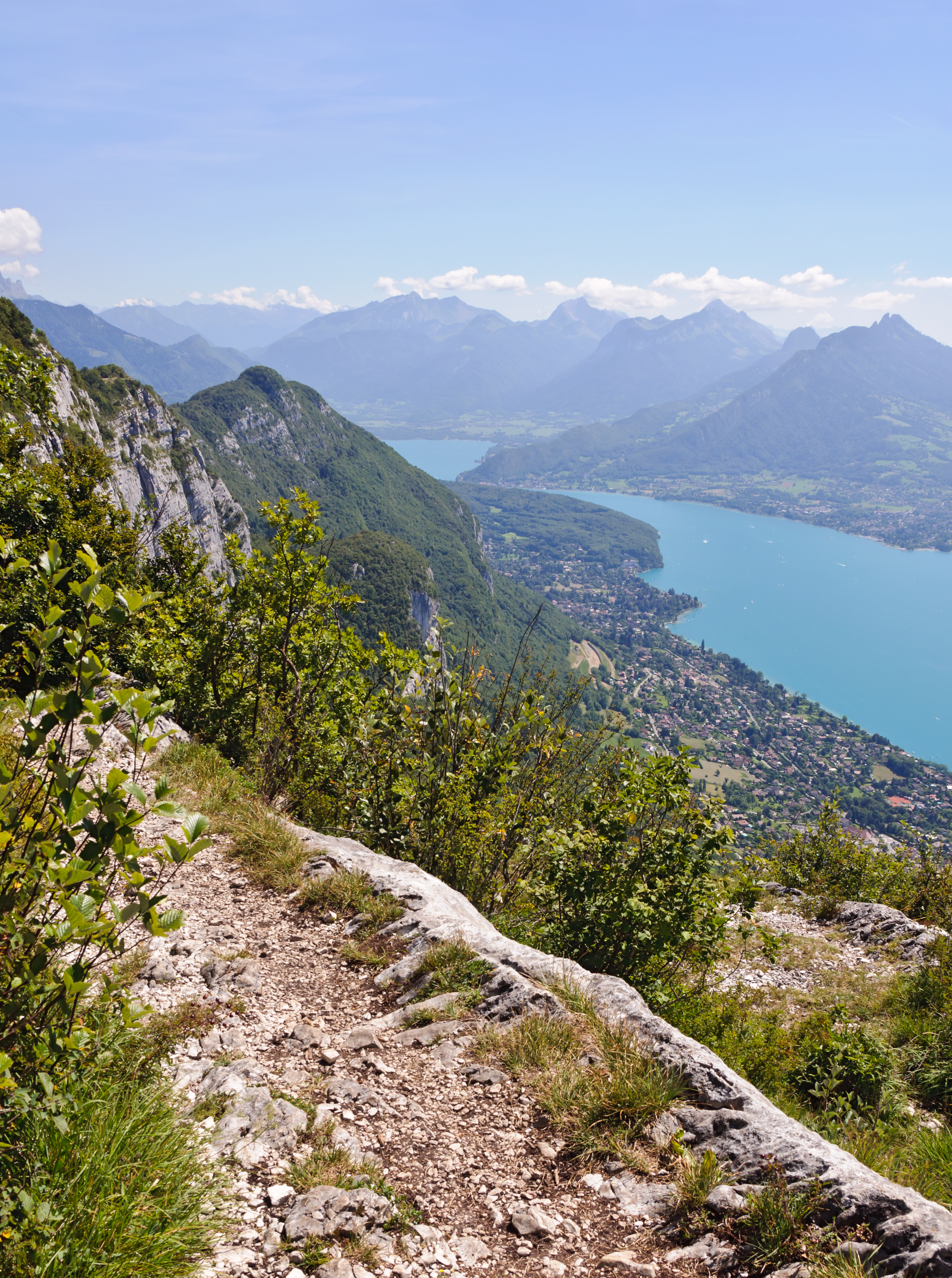
On the trail between Mount Veyrier and Mount Baron

Summits visible from Annecy (and the massif de la Tournette):

- Tête du Parmelan, 1,832 m (6,010 ft)
- Dents de Lanfon, 1,824 m (5,984 ft)
- Mount Veyrier, 1,291 m (4,236 ft)
- Mount Baron, 1,254 m (4,114 ft) (in the Veyrier mountains)

As well as its peaks, it has plateaus which are slightly elevated but difficult to access, such as the plateau des Glières tragically famous from the time of the Second World War.

== Geology ==
As with all the prealpine massifs, the Aravis chain is primarily formed of limestone and its derivatives.

== Activities ==
=== Tourist station ===
The massif benefits from exceptional snow considering its moderate altitude. It hosts two stations for the winter sports Alpine skiing and cross-country skiing, with pistes from 900 m up to 2000 m:

- Le Grand-Bornand (Chinaillon)
- Le Mont-Saxonnex (pronounced "saxxonay")
- Saint-Jean-de-Sixt

Tourist activities are also very popular in summer. The stations are first and foremost mountain villages where there remains significant farming activity.

The Glières Plateau is likewise a well-known site for cross-country skiing.

=== Economy ===
The massif is the source of reblochon, the famous cheese. Reblochon was first made in Le Grand-Bornand, and is now produced in large quantities using traditional methods in the massif's valleys. Two important markets are held weekly at Thônes and at Le Grand-Bornand. There is also a notable wood industry.

== See also ==
- Geography of the Alps
