= 2017 Critérium du Dauphiné =

Cycling race

2017 UCI World Tour, race 23 of 37

Race details
- Dates: 4–11 June 2017
- Stages: 8
- Distance: 1,155 km (718 mi)
- Winning time: 29h 05' 54"

Results
Jersey awarded to the overall winner	Winner	Jakob Fuglsang (DEN)	(Astana)
	Second	Richie Porte (AUS)	(BMC Racing Team)
	Third	Dan Martin (IRL)	(Quick-Step Floors)
Jersey awarded to the points classification winner	Points	Arnaud Démare (FRA)	(FDJ)
Jersey awarded to the mountains classification winner	Mountains	Koen Bouwman (NED)	(LottoNL–Jumbo)
Jersey awarded to the young rider classification winner	Young rider	Emanuel Buchmann (GER)	(Bora–Hansgrohe)
	Team	AG2R La Mondiale	

The 2017 Critérium du Dauphiné was a road cycling stage race that took place between 4 and 11 June 2017. It was the 69th edition of the Critérium du Dauphiné and was the twenty-third event of the 2017 UCI World Tour.

The race was won on the final day by Danish rider Jakob Fuglsang, riding for the Astana team. Having trailed overnight leader Richie Porte (BMC Racing Team) by 75 seconds going into the stage, Fuglsang made his bid for victory by attacking along with AG2R La Mondiale's Romain Bardet and Quick-Step Floors rider Dan Martin on the Col de la Colombière, around 35 kilometres (22 miles) from the finish. They were later caught before the final climb; Fuglsang and Martin went clear again on that climb, with Fuglsang later dropping Martin. Fuglsang remained clear to the finish, winning his second stage of the race by 12 seconds from Martin. Porte ultimately finished the stage in seventh place, 75 seconds behind Fuglsang; however, with bonus seconds in play on the race, Fuglsang's ten-second bonus gave him the race victory by ten seconds over Porte, a first for Denmark at the race. Martin finished third overall, as his six-second bonus allowed him to overtake Chris Froome (Team Sky) by a single second.

In the race's other classifications, FDJ rider Arnaud Démare won the points classification while LottoNL–Jumbo rider Koen Bouwman won the mountains classification having won the second and third stages respectively. Bora–Hansgrohe's Emanuel Buchmann won the young rider classification, while AG2R La Mondiale won the teams classification.

== Teams ==
As the Critérium du Dauphiné is a UCI World Tour event, all eighteen UCI WorldTeams were invited automatically and obliged to enter a team in the race. Four UCI Professional Continental teams competed, completing the 22-team peloton.

UCI WorldTeams

- AG2R La Mondiale
- Astana
- Bahrain–Merida
- BMC Racing Team
- Bora–Hansgrohe
- Cannondale–Drapac
- Team Dimension Data
- FDJ
- Team Katusha–Alpecin
- LottoNL–Jumbo
- Lotto–Soudal
- Movistar Team
- Orica–Scott
- Quick-Step Floors
- Team Sky
- Team Sunweb
- Trek–Segafredo
- UAE Team Emirates

UCI Professional Continental teams

- Cofidis
- Delko–Marseille Provence KTM
- Direct Énergie
- Wanty–Groupe Gobert

== Route ==
The route of the 2017 Critérium du Dauphiné was announced on 16 March 2017.

Stage characteristics and winners
Stage	Date	Course	Distance	Type	Winner
1	4 June	Saint-Étienne to Saint-Étienne	170.5 km (105.9 mi)	Hilly stage	Thomas De Gendt (BEL)
2	5 June	Saint-Chamond to Arlanc	171 km (106.3 mi)	Hilly stage	Arnaud Démare (FRA)
3	6 June	Le Chambon-sur-Lignon to Tullins	184 km (114.3 mi)	Flat stage	Koen Bouwman (NED)
4	7 June	La Tour-du-Pin to Bourgoin-Jallieu	23.5 km (14.6 mi)	Individual time trial	Richie Porte (AUS)
5	8 June	La Tour-de-Salvagny to Mâcon	175.5 km (109.1 mi)	Flat stage	Phil Bauhaus (GER)
6	9 June	Parc des Oiseaux to La Motte-Servolex	147.5 km (91.7 mi)	Medium-mountain stage	Jakob Fuglsang (DEN)
7	10 June	Aoste to Alpe d'Huez	168 km (104.4 mi)	Mountain stage	Peter Kennaugh (GBR)
8	11 June	Albertville to Plateau de Solaison	115 km (71.5 mi)	Mountain stage	Jakob Fuglsang (DEN)

== Stages ==
=== Stage 1 ===
4 June 2017 — Saint-Étienne to Saint-Étienne, 170.5 km (105.9 mi)

Stage 1 result
Rank	Rider	Team	Time
1	Thomas De Gendt (BEL)	Lotto–Soudal	4h 17' 04"
2	Axel Domont (FRA)	AG2R La Mondiale	+ 44"
3	Diego Ulissi (ITA)	UAE Team Emirates	+ 57"
4	Pierre Latour (FRA)	AG2R La Mondiale	+ 57"
5	Emanuel Buchmann (GER)	Bora–Hansgrohe	+ 57"
6	Sonny Colbrelli (ITA)	Bahrain–Merida	+ 59"
7	Julien Simon (FRA)	Cofidis	+ 59"
8	Alejandro Valverde (ESP)	Movistar Team	+ 59"
9	Ben Swift (GBR)	UAE Team Emirates	+ 59"
10	Michael Valgren (DEN)	Astana	+ 59"

General classification after Stage 1
Rank	Rider	Team	Time
1	Thomas De Gendt (BEL)	Lotto–Soudal	4h 16' 54"
2	Axel Domont (FRA)	AG2R La Mondiale	+ 48"
3	Diego Ulissi (ITA)	UAE Team Emirates	+ 1' 03"
4	Pierre Latour (FRA)	AG2R La Mondiale	+ 1' 07"
5	Emanuel Buchmann (GER)	Bora–Hansgrohe	+ 1' 07"
6	Sonny Colbrelli (ITA)	Bahrain–Merida	+ 1' 09"
7	Julien Simon (FRA)	Cofidis	+ 1' 09"
8	Alejandro Valverde (ESP)	Movistar Team	+ 1' 09"
9	Ben Swift (GBR)	UAE Team Emirates	+ 1' 09"
10	Michael Valgren (DEN)	Astana	+ 1' 09"

=== Stage 2 ===
5 June 2017 — Saint-Chamond to Arlanc, 171 km (106 mi)

Stage 2 result
Rank	Rider	Team	Time
1	Arnaud Démare (FRA)	FDJ	4h 13' 53"
2	Alexander Kristoff (NOR)	Team Katusha–Alpecin	+ 0"
3	Nacer Bouhanni (FRA)	Cofidis	+ 0"
4	Sonny Colbrelli (ITA)	Bahrain–Merida	+ 0"
5	Phil Bauhaus (GER)	Team Sunweb	+ 0"
6	Edvald Boasson Hagen (NOR)	Team Dimension Data	+ 0"
7	Ben Swift (GBR)	UAE Team Emirates	+ 0"
8	Pascal Ackermann (GER)	Bora–Hansgrohe	+ 0"
9	Alberto Bettiol (ITA)	Cannondale–Drapac	+ 0"
10	Bryan Coquard (FRA)	Direct Énergie	+ 0"

General classification after Stage 2
Rank	Rider	Team	Time
1	Thomas De Gendt (BEL)	Lotto–Soudal	8h 30' 47"
2	Axel Domont (FRA)	AG2R La Mondiale	+ 48"
3	Diego Ulissi (ITA)	UAE Team Emirates	+ 1' 03"
4	Pierre Latour (FRA)	AG2R La Mondiale	+ 1' 07"
5	Emanuel Buchmann (GER)	Bora–Hansgrohe	+ 1' 07"
6	Sonny Colbrelli (ITA)	Bahrain–Merida	+ 1' 09"
7	Ben Swift (GBR)	UAE Team Emirates	+ 1' 09"
8	Alberto Bettiol (ITA)	Cannondale–Drapac	+ 1' 09"
9	Tony Gallopin (FRA)	Lotto–Soudal	+ 1' 09"
10	Julien Simon (FRA)	Cofidis	+ 1' 09"

=== Stage 3 ===
6 June 2017 — Le Chambon-sur-Lignon to Tullins, 184 km (114.3 mi)

Stage 3 result
Rank	Rider	Team	Time
1	Koen Bouwman (NED)	LottoNL–Jumbo	4h 06' 06"
2	Evaldas Šiškevičius (LTU)	Delko–Marseille Provence KTM	+ 0"
3	Frederik Backaert (BEL)	Wanty–Groupe Gobert	+ 0"
4	Bryan Nauleau (FRA)	Direct Énergie	+ 0"
5	Alexey Vermeulen (USA)	LottoNL–Jumbo	+ 0"
6	Quentin Pacher (FRA)	Delko–Marseille Provence KTM	+ 0"
7	Arnaud Démare (FRA)	FDJ	+ 11"
8	Bryan Coquard (FRA)	Direct Énergie	+ 11"
9	Pascal Ackermann (GER)	Bora–Hansgrohe	+ 11"
10	Phil Bauhaus (GER)	Team Sunweb	+ 11"

General classification after Stage 3
Rank	Rider	Team	Time
1	Thomas De Gendt (BEL)	Lotto–Soudal	12h 37' 04"
2	Axel Domont (FRA)	AG2R La Mondiale	+ 48"
3	Diego Ulissi (ITA)	UAE Team Emirates	+ 1' 03"
4	Pierre Latour (FRA)	AG2R La Mondiale	+ 1' 07"
5	Emanuel Buchmann (GER)	Bora–Hansgrohe	+ 1' 07"
6	Sonny Colbrelli (ITA)	Bahrain–Merida	+ 1' 09"
7	Ben Swift (GBR)	UAE Team Emirates	+ 1' 09"
8	Alejandro Valverde (ESP)	Movistar Team	+ 1' 09"
9	Tony Gallopin (FRA)	Lotto–Soudal	+ 1' 09"
10	Guillaume Martin (FRA)	Wanty–Groupe Gobert	+ 1' 09"

=== Stage 4 ===
7 June 2017 — La Tour-du-Pin to Bourgoin-Jallieu, 23.5 km (14.6 mi), individual time trial (ITT)

Stage 4 result
Rank	Rider	Team	Time
1	Richie Porte (AUS)	BMC Racing Team	28' 07"
2	Tony Martin (GER)	Team Katusha–Alpecin	+ 12"
3	Alejandro Valverde (ESP)	Movistar Team	+ 24"
4	Stef Clement (NED)	LottoNL–Jumbo	+ 28"
5	Chad Haga (USA)	Team Sunweb	+ 32"
6	Jasha Sütterlin (GER)	Movistar Team	+ 32"
7	Alberto Contador (ESP)	Trek–Segafredo	+ 35"
8	Chris Froome (GBR)	Team Sky	+ 37"
9	Thomas De Gendt (BEL)	Lotto–Soudal	+ 42"
10	Brent Bookwalter (USA)	BMC Racing Team	+ 45"

General classification after Stage 4
Rank	Rider	Team	Time
1	Thomas De Gendt (BEL)	Lotto–Soudal	13h 05' 53"
2	Richie Porte (AUS)	BMC Racing Team	+ 27"
3	Alejandro Valverde (ESP)	Movistar Team	+ 51"
4	Stef Clement (NED)	LottoNL–Jumbo	+ 55"
5	Alberto Contador (ESP)	Trek–Segafredo	+ 1' 02"
6	Chris Froome (GBR)	Team Sky	+ 1' 04"
7	Brent Bookwalter (USA)	BMC Racing Team	+ 1' 12"
8	Jesús Herrada (ESP)	Movistar Team	+ 1' 15"
9	Sam Oomen (NED)	Team Sunweb	+ 1' 17"
10	Diego Ulissi (ITA)	UAE Team Emirates	+ 1' 22"

=== Stage 5 ===
8 June 2017 — La Tour-de-Salvagny to Mâcon, 175.5 km (109.1 mi)

Stage 5 result
Rank	Rider	Team	Time
1	Phil Bauhaus (GER)	Team Sunweb	4h 04' 32"
2	Arnaud Démare (FRA)	FDJ	+ 0"
3	Bryan Coquard (FRA)	Direct Énergie	+ 0"
4	Adrien Petit (FRA)	Direct Énergie	+ 0"
5	Nacer Bouhanni (FRA)	Cofidis	+ 0"
6	Alexander Kristoff (NOR)	Team Katusha–Alpecin	+ 0"
7	Pascal Ackermann (GER)	Bora–Hansgrohe	+ 0"
8	Edvald Boasson Hagen (NOR)	Team Dimension Data	+ 0"
9	Enrico Battaglin (ITA)	LottoNL–Jumbo	+ 0"
10	Oliver Naesen (BEL)	AG2R La Mondiale	+ 0"

General classification after Stage 5
Rank	Rider	Team	Time
1	Thomas De Gendt (BEL)	Lotto–Soudal	17h 10' 25"
2	Richie Porte (AUS)	BMC Racing Team	+ 27"
3	Alejandro Valverde (ESP)	Movistar Team	+ 51"
4	Stef Clement (NED)	LottoNL–Jumbo	+ 55"
5	Alberto Contador (ESP)	Trek–Segafredo	+ 1' 02"
6	Chris Froome (GBR)	Team Sky	+ 1' 04"
7	Brent Bookwalter (USA)	BMC Racing Team	+ 1' 12"
8	Jesús Herrada (ESP)	Movistar Team	+ 1' 15"
9	Sam Oomen (NED)	Team Sunweb	+ 1' 17"
10	Diego Ulissi (ITA)	UAE Team Emirates	+ 1' 22"

=== Stage 6 ===
9 June 2017 — Parc des Oiseaux to La Motte-Servolex, 147.5 km (91.7 mi)

Stage 6 result
Rank	Rider	Team	Time
1	Jakob Fuglsang (DEN)	Astana	3h 41' 48"
2	Richie Porte (AUS)	BMC Racing Team	+ 0"
3	Chris Froome (GBR)	Team Sky	+ 0"
4	Fabio Aru (ITA)	Astana	+ 0"
5	Alejandro Valverde (ESP)	Movistar Team	+ 50"
6	Dan Martin (IRL)	Quick-Step Floors	+ 50"
7	Romain Bardet (FRA)	AG2R La Mondiale	+ 50"
8	Oliver Naesen (BEL)	AG2R La Mondiale	+ 1' 06"
9	Alberto Contador (ESP)	Trek–Segafredo	+ 1' 06"
10	Emanuel Buchmann (GER)	Bora–Hansgrohe	+ 1' 14"

General classification after Stage 6
Rank	Rider	Team	Time
1	Richie Porte (AUS)	BMC Racing Team	20h 52' 34"
2	Chris Froome (GBR)	Team Sky	+ 39"
3	Jakob Fuglsang (DEN)	Astana	+ 1' 15"
4	Alejandro Valverde (ESP)	Movistar Team	+ 1' 20"
5	Fabio Aru (ITA)	Astana	+ 1' 24"
6	Alberto Contador (ESP)	Trek–Segafredo	+ 1' 47"
7	Dan Martin (IRL)	Quick-Step Floors	+ 2' 14"
8	Emanuel Buchmann (GER)	Bora–Hansgrohe	+ 2' 30"
9	Romain Bardet (FRA)	AG2R La Mondiale	+ 2' 49"
10	Rafael Valls (ESP)	Lotto–Soudal	+ 3' 16"

=== Stage 7 ===
10 June 2017 — Aoste to Alpe d'Huez, 168 km (104.4 mi)

Stage 7 result
Rank	Rider	Team	Time
1	Peter Kennaugh (GBR)	Team Sky	4h 43' 59"
2	Ben Swift (GBR)	UAE Team Emirates	+ 13"
3	Jesús Herrada (ESP)	Movistar Team	+ 1' 11"
4	Jelle Vanendert (BEL)	Lotto–Soudal	+ 1' 13"
5	Romain Bardet (FRA)	AG2R La Mondiale	+ 1' 14"
6	Richie Porte (AUS)	BMC Racing Team	+ 1' 56"
7	Jakob Fuglsang (DEN)	Astana	+ 1' 56"
8	Andrew Talansky (USA)	Cannondale–Drapac	+ 2' 04"
9	Alberto Contador (ESP)	Trek–Segafredo	+ 2' 04"
10	Fabio Aru (ITA)	Astana	+ 2' 13"

General classification after Stage 7
Rank	Rider	Team	Time
1	Richie Porte (AUS)	BMC Racing Team	25h 38' 29"
2	Chris Froome (GBR)	Team Sky	+ 1' 02"
3	Jakob Fuglsang (DEN)	Astana	+ 1' 15"
4	Fabio Aru (ITA)	Astana	+ 1' 41"
5	Alejandro Valverde (ESP)	Movistar Team	+ 1' 43"
6	Romain Bardet (FRA)	AG2R La Mondiale	+ 2' 07"
7	Alberto Contador (ESP)	Trek–Segafredo	+ 2' 15"
8	Dan Martin (IRL)	Quick-Step Floors	+ 2' 31"
9	Emanuel Buchmann (GER)	Bora–Hansgrohe	+ 2' 53"
10	Andrew Talansky (USA)	Cannondale–Drapac	+ 3' 43"

=== Stage 8 ===
11 June 2017 — Albertville to Plateau de Solaison, 115 km (71.5 mi)

Stage 8 result
Rank	Rider	Team	Time
1	Jakob Fuglsang (DEN)	Astana	3h 26' 20"
2	Dan Martin (IRL)	Quick-Step Floors	+ 12"
3	Louis Meintjes (RSA)	UAE Team Emirates	+ 27"
4	Emanuel Buchmann (GER)	Bora–Hansgrohe	+ 44"
5	Fabio Aru (ITA)	Astana	+ 1' 01"
6	Romain Bardet (FRA)	AG2R La Mondiale	+ 1' 02"
7	Richie Porte (AUS)	BMC Racing Team	+ 1' 15"
8	Chris Froome (GBR)	Team Sky	+ 1' 36"
9	Rafael Valls (ESP)	Lotto–Soudal	+ 1' 41"
10	Alejandro Valverde (ESP)	Movistar Team	+ 3' 30"

Final general classification
Rank	Rider	Team	Time
1	Jakob Fuglsang (DEN)	Astana	29h 05' 54"
2	Richie Porte (AUS)	BMC Racing Team	+ 10"
3	Dan Martin (IRL)	Quick-Step Floors	+ 1' 32"
4	Chris Froome (GBR)	Team Sky	+ 1' 33"
5	Fabio Aru (ITA)	Astana	+ 1' 37"
6	Romain Bardet (FRA)	AG2R La Mondiale	+ 2' 04"
7	Emanuel Buchmann (GER)	Bora–Hansgrohe	+ 2' 32"
8	Louis Meintjes (RSA)	UAE Team Emirates	+ 3' 12"
9	Alejandro Valverde (ESP)	Movistar Team	+ 4' 08"
10	Rafael Valls (ESP)	Lotto–Soudal	+ 4' 40"

== Classification leadership table ==
In the Critérium du Dauphiné, four different jerseys were awarded. The most important was the general classification, which was calculated by adding each cyclist's finishing times on each stage. Time bonuses were awarded to the first three finishers on all stages except for the individual time trial: the stage winner won a ten-second bonus, with six and four seconds for the second and third riders respectively. The rider with the least accumulated time is the race leader, identified by a yellow jersey with a blue bar; the winner of this classification was considered the winner of the race.

Points for the points classification
Position	1	2	3	4	5	6	7	8	9	10
Stages 1–3 & 5	25	22	20	18	16	14	12	10	8	6
Stages 4, 6–8	15	12	10	8	6	5	4	3	2	1

Additionally, there was a points classification, which awarded a green jersey. In the classification, cyclists received points for finishing in the top 10 in a stage. More points were awarded on the flatter stages in the opening half of the race.

Points for the mountains classification
Position	1	2	3	4	5	6	7	8	9	10
Points for Hors-category	15	12	10	8	6	5	4	3	2	1
Points for Category 1	10	8	6	4	2	1	0			
Points for Category 2	5	3	2	1	0					
Points for Category 3	2	1	0							
Points for Category 4	1	0								

There was also a mountains classification, the leadership of which was marked by a red jersey with white polka dots. In the mountains classification, points towards the classification were won by reaching the top of a climb before other cyclists. Each climb was categorised as either hors, first, second, third, or fourth-category, with more points available for the higher-categorised climbs. Hors-category climbs awarded the most points; the first ten riders were able to accrue points, compared with the first six on first-category climbs, the first four on second-category, the first two on third-category and only the first for fourth-category.

The fourth jersey represented the young rider classification, marked by a white jersey. This was decided the same way as the general classification, but only riders born on or after 1 January 1992 were eligible to be ranked in the classification. There was also a team classification, in which the times of the best three cyclists per team on each stage were added together; the leading team at the end of the race was the team with the lowest total time.

Classification leadership by stage
Stage	Winner	General classification	Points classification	Mountains classification	Young rider classification	Team classification
1	Thomas De Gendt	Thomas De Gendt	Thomas De Gendt (Note: In stage 2, Axel Domont, who was second in the points and mountains classifications, wore the green points jersey, because Thomas De Gendt (in first place) wore the yellow and blue jersey as leader of the general classification during that stage. Ángel Madrazo, who was third in the mountains classification, wore the red and white polka-dot jersey as a result of this.)	Thomas De Gendt (Note: In stages 3 to 5, Koen Bouwman, who was second in the mountains classification, wore the red and white polka-dot jersey, because Thomas De Gendt (in first place) wore the yellow and blue jersey as leader of the general classification during that stage.)	Pierre Latour	Lotto–Soudal
2	Arnaud Démare	Thomas De Gendt	Sonny Colbrelli	Thomas De Gendt	Pierre Latour	Lotto–Soudal
3	Koen Bouwman	Thomas De Gendt	Arnaud Démare	Thomas De Gendt	Pierre Latour	Lotto–Soudal
4	Richie Porte	Thomas De Gendt	Arnaud Démare	Thomas De Gendt	Sam Oomen	Movistar Team
5	Phil Bauhaus	Thomas De Gendt	Arnaud Démare	Koen Bouwman	Sam Oomen	Movistar Team
6	Jakob Fuglsang	Richie Porte	Arnaud Démare	Koen Bouwman	Emanuel Buchmann	AG2R La Mondiale
7	Peter Kennaugh	Richie Porte	Arnaud Démare	Koen Bouwman	Emanuel Buchmann	AG2R La Mondiale
8	Jakob Fuglsang	Jakob Fuglsang	Arnaud Démare	Koen Bouwman	Emanuel Buchmann	AG2R La Mondiale
Final		Jakob Fuglsang	Arnaud Démare	Koen Bouwman	Emanuel Buchmann	AG2R La Mondiale
