= Pointe d'Andey =

Mountain in Haute-Savoie, France

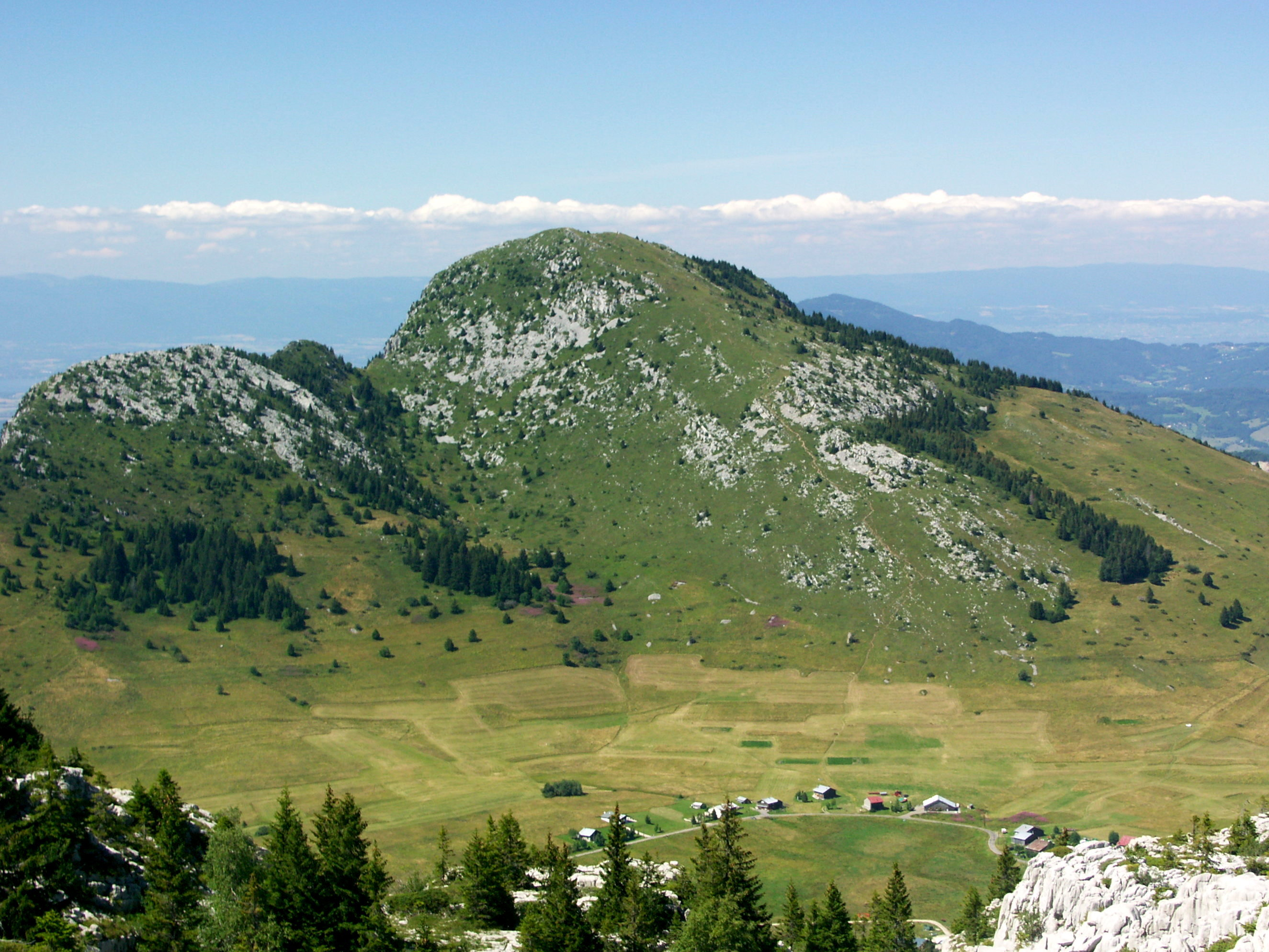

Highest point
- Elevation: 1,877 m (6,158 ft)
- Coordinates: 46°02′34″N 06°25′05″E

Geography
- Location within France
- Location: Haute-Savoie, France
- Parent range: Bornes Massif

Pointe d'Andey (French pronunciation: [pwɛ̃t dɑ̃dɛ]) is a mountain of Haute-Savoie, France. It lies in the Bornes Massif range. It has an altitude of 1877 metres above sea level.
