= La Tournette =

Mountain in France

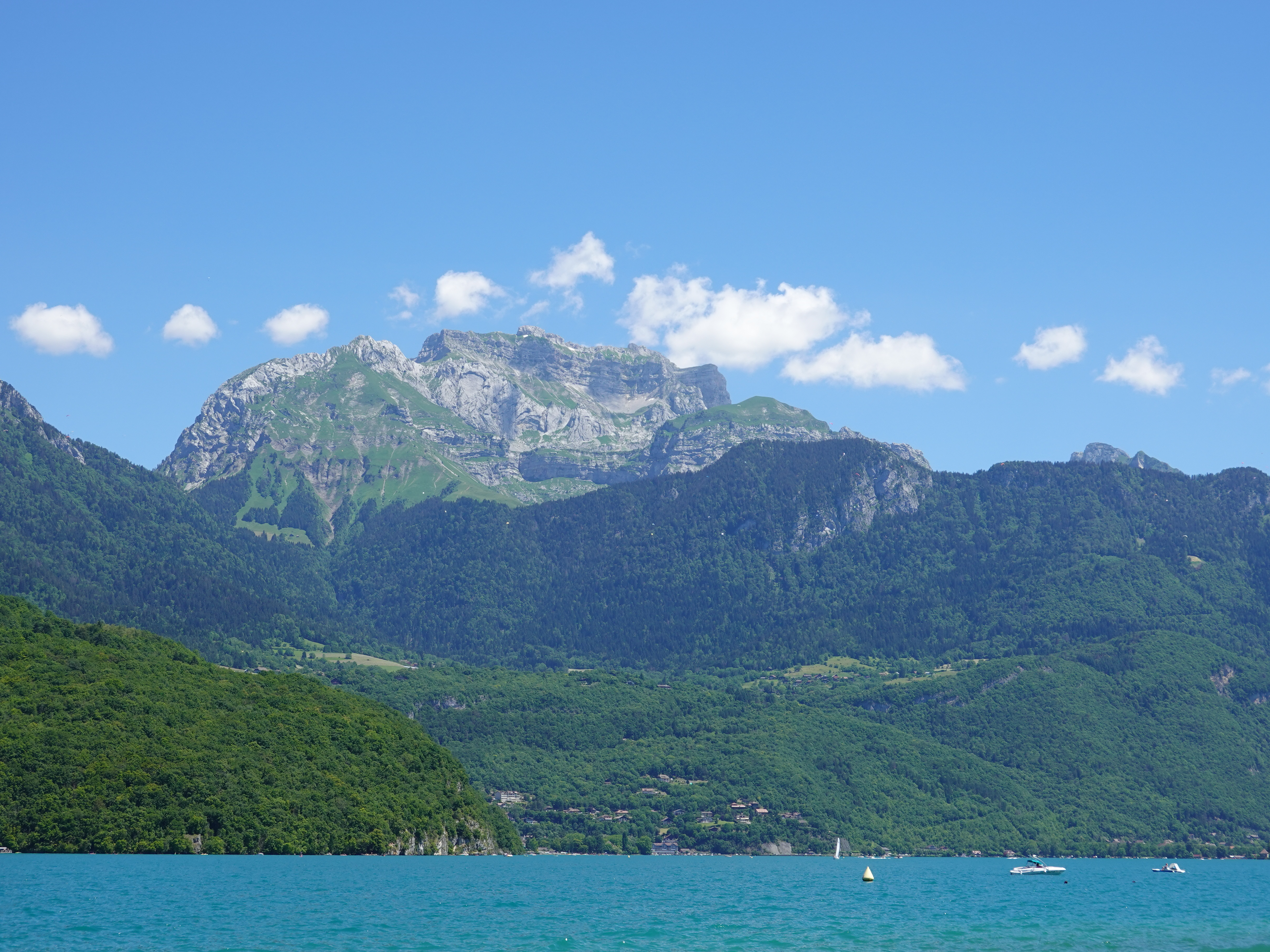
- Lake Annecy with La Tournette in the background

Highest point
- Elevation: 2,351 m (7,713 ft)
- Prominence: 1,514 m (4,967 ft)
- Isolation: 10.68 km (6.64 mi)
- Listing: Ultra
- Coordinates: 45°49′38″N 06°17′11″E

Geography
- Location within Alps
- Location: Haute-Savoie, France
- Parent range: Bornes Massif

La Tournette (French pronunciation: [la tuʁnɛt]) (2,351 m or 7,713ft) is a mountain in the Bornes Massif in Haute-Savoie, France. It is the highest of the mountains surrounding Lake Annecy and has a prominence of 1,514 (4,967ft), qualifying it as an Ultra.

== Tourism ==
The nearest trailhead to the summit is from the public car park at Prés Ronds. From Prés Ronds, the summit can be reached via a well-marked path in around four hours. The final part of the climb requires some scrambling. The summit consists of a boulder on which there are chains and two ladders to assist with ascending to the summit cross.

== See also ==
- List of Alpine peaks by prominence
