= Montmirey-la-Ville =

Commune in Bourgogne-Franche-Comté, France

- Commune
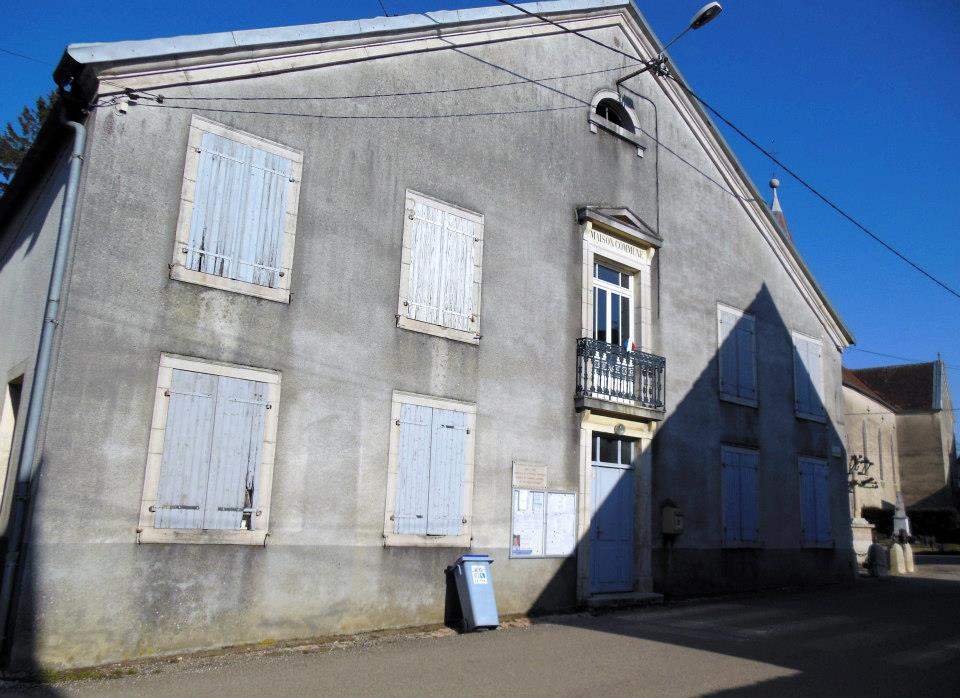
- The town hall in Montmirey-la-Ville

- Coat of arms
- Location of Montmirey-la-Ville
- Location within France Location within Bourgogne-Franche-Comté
- Coordinates: 47°13′04″N 5°31′15″E
- Country: France
- Region: Bourgogne-Franche-Comté
- Department: Jura
- Arrondissement: Dole
- Canton: Authume

Government
  - Mayor (2020–2026): Eric Pertus
- Area^{1}: 3.93 km^{2} (1.52 sq mi)
- Highest elevation: 320 m (1,050 ft)
- Lowest elevation: 197 m (646 ft)
- Population (2023): 176
  - Density: 44.8/km^{2} (116/sq mi)
- Time zone: UTC+01:00 (CET)
  - Summer (DST): UTC+02:00 (CEST)
- INSEE/Postal code: 39360 /39290
- ^{1} French Land Register data, which excludes lakes, ponds, glaciers > 1 km^{2} (0.386 sq mi or 247 acres) and river estuaries.

Montmirey-la-Ville (French pronunciation: [mɔ̃miʁɛ la vil]) is a commune in the Jura department in Bourgogne-Franche-Comté in eastern France.

== See also ==
- Communes of the Jura department
