= Menthon-Saint-Bernard =

Menthon-Saint-Bernard Menton (Arpitan)
- Commune
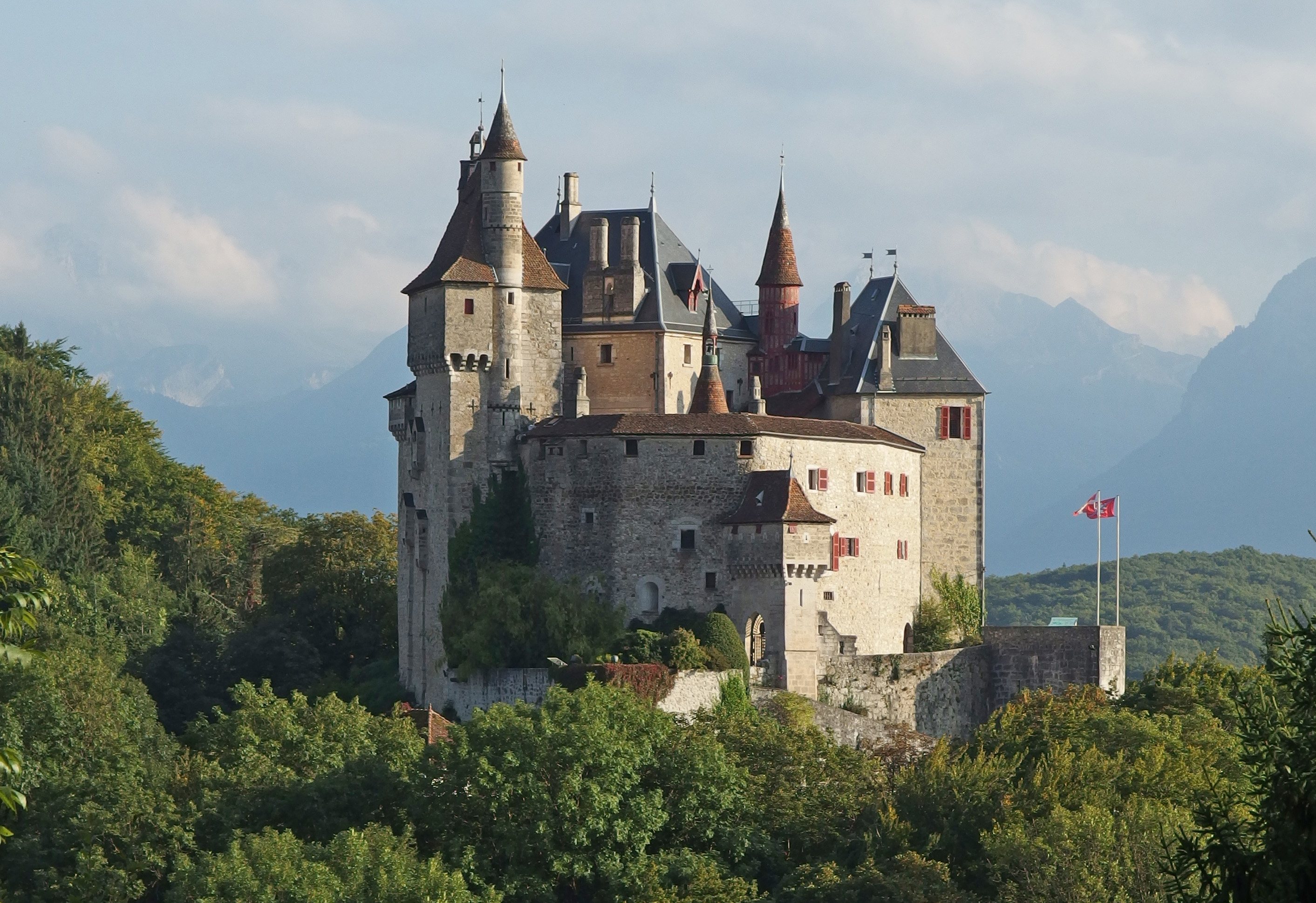
- A view of the Château de Menthon-Saint-Bernard above Lake Annecy

- Coat of arms
- Location of Menthon-Saint-Bernard
- Location within France Location within Auvergne-Rhône-Alpes
- Coordinates: 45°51′36″N 6°11′47″E
- Country: France
- Region: Auvergne-Rhône-Alpes
- Department: Haute-Savoie
- Arrondissement: Annecy
- Canton: Faverges
- Intercommunality: CA Grand Annecy

Government
  - Mayor (2020–2026): Antoine de Menthon
- Area^{1}: 4.51 km^{2} (1.74 sq mi)
- Highest elevation: 1,229 m (4,032 ft)
- Lowest elevation: 443 m (1,453 ft)
- Population (2023): 1,891
  - Density: 419/km^{2} (1,090/sq mi)
- Demonym: Menthonnais / Menthonnaises
- Time zone: UTC+01:00 (CET)
  - Summer (DST): UTC+02:00 (CEST)
- INSEE/Postal code: 74176 /74290
- ^{1} French Land Register data, which excludes lakes, ponds, glaciers > 1 km^{2} (0.386 sq mi or 247 acres) and river estuaries.

Menthon-Saint-Bernard (French pronunciation: [mɑ̃tɔ̃ sɛ̃ bɛʁnaʁ]; Arpitan: Menton), commonly referred to simply as Menthon, is a commune on the eastern shore of Lake Annecy in the Haute-Savoie department in the Auvergne-Rhône-Alpes region in Southeastern France. As of 2023, the population of the commune was 1,891.

== History ==
At the waterfront of Lake Annecy in the commune of Menthon-Saint-Bernard, traces of prehistoric and later Gallo-Roman occupation have been found. Over the next centuries, at the foot of the Château de Menthon-Saint-Bernard, a few hamlets evolved.

Menthon-Saint-Bernard has become a noted resort place since the late 19th century because of its thermal baths, already in use in the Roman era and later under the Société des Bains de Menthon, as well as its proximity to Annecy and the mountain settlements of Manigod, La Clusaz, La Croix Fry and Le Grand-Bornand. One of the most noted hotels in Menthon-Saint-Bernard, the Palace de Menthon, is housed in a waterfront building opened in 1906 by the Gruffaz brothers.

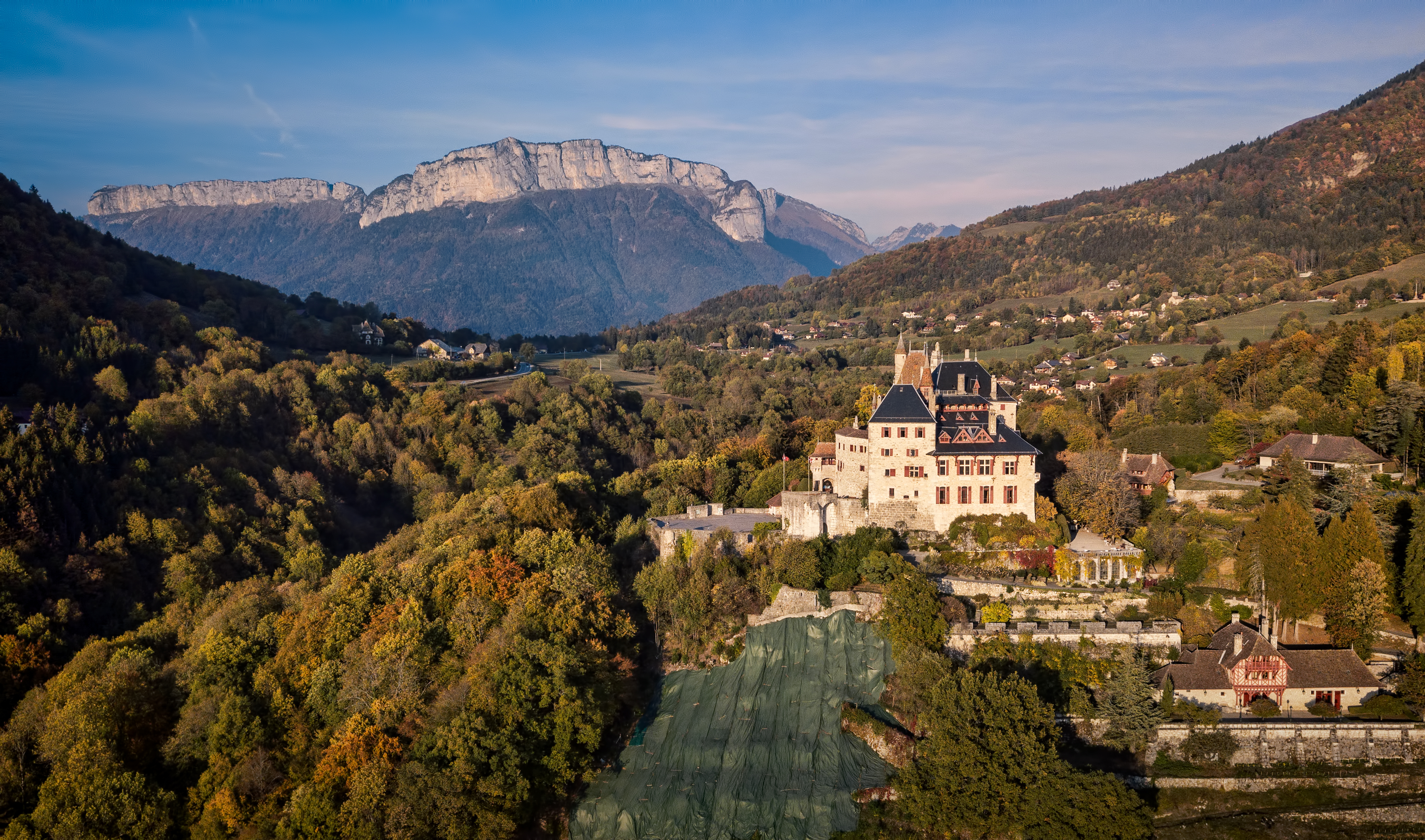
The Château de Menthon-Saint-Bernard with Mont Téret in the background

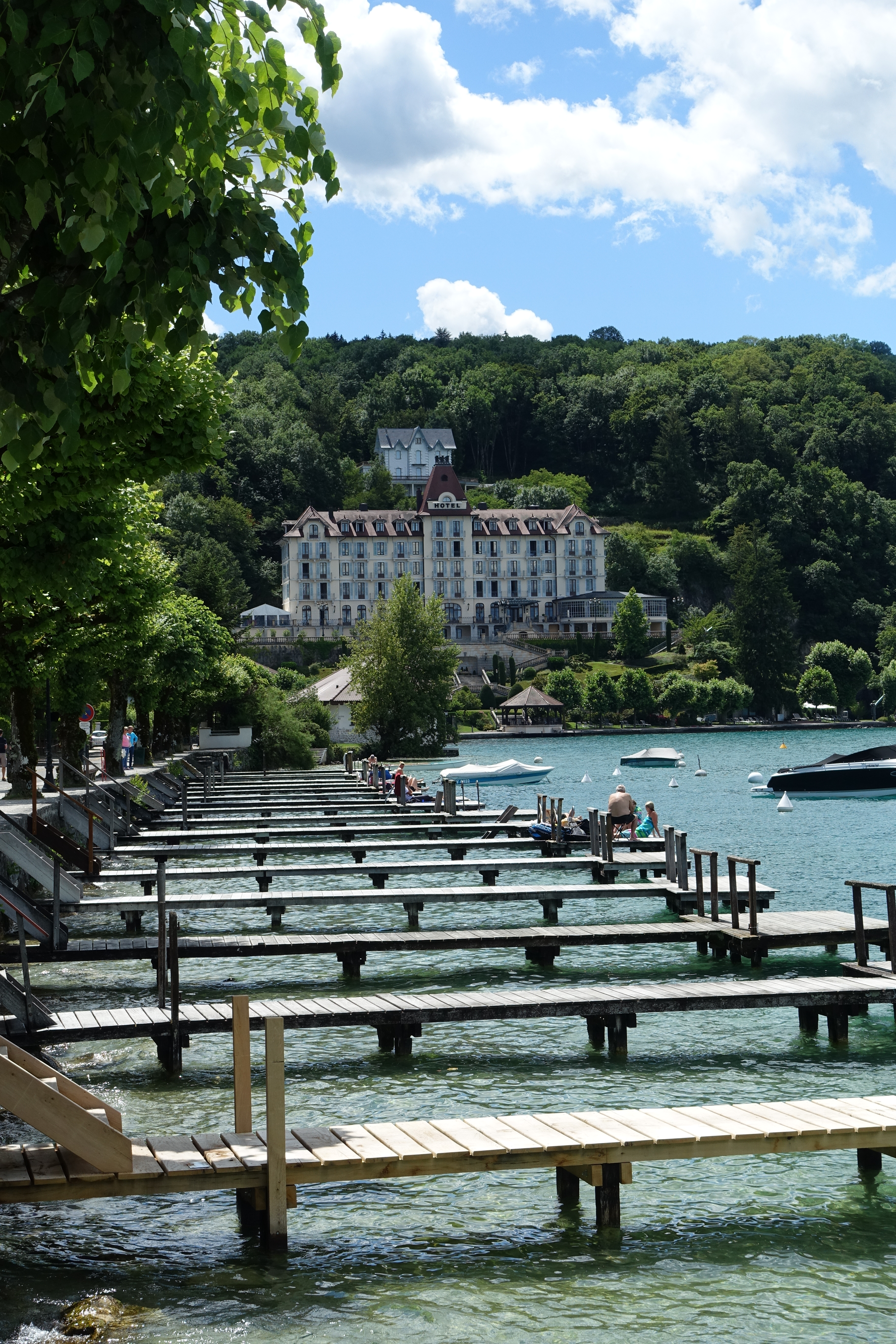
Palace de Menthon

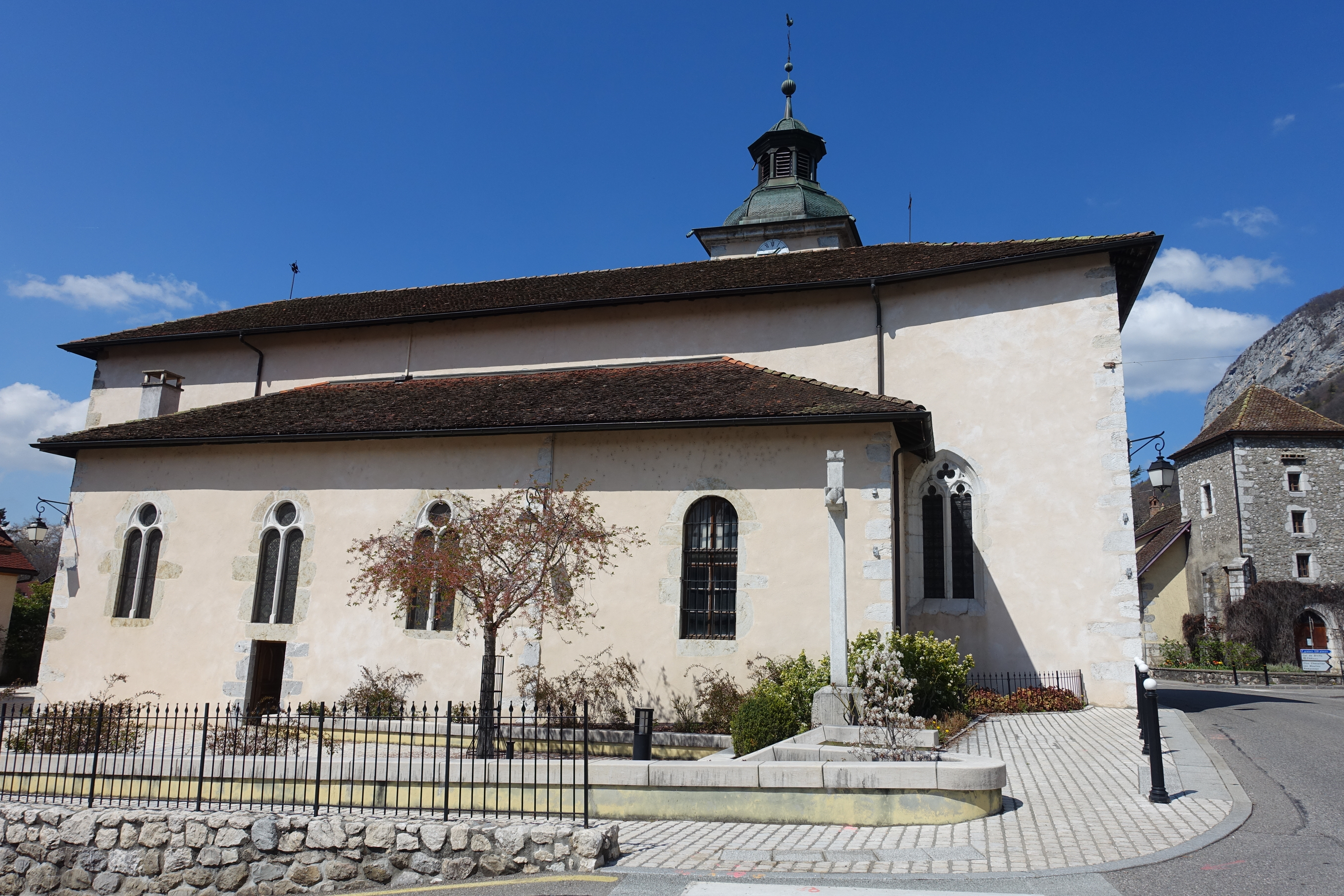
Église Saint-Bernard de Menthon

== See also ==
- Communes of the Haute-Savoie department
- Bernard of Menthon
