= Lake Annecy =

Alpine lake in Haute-Savoie, France

- Lac d'Annecy (French)
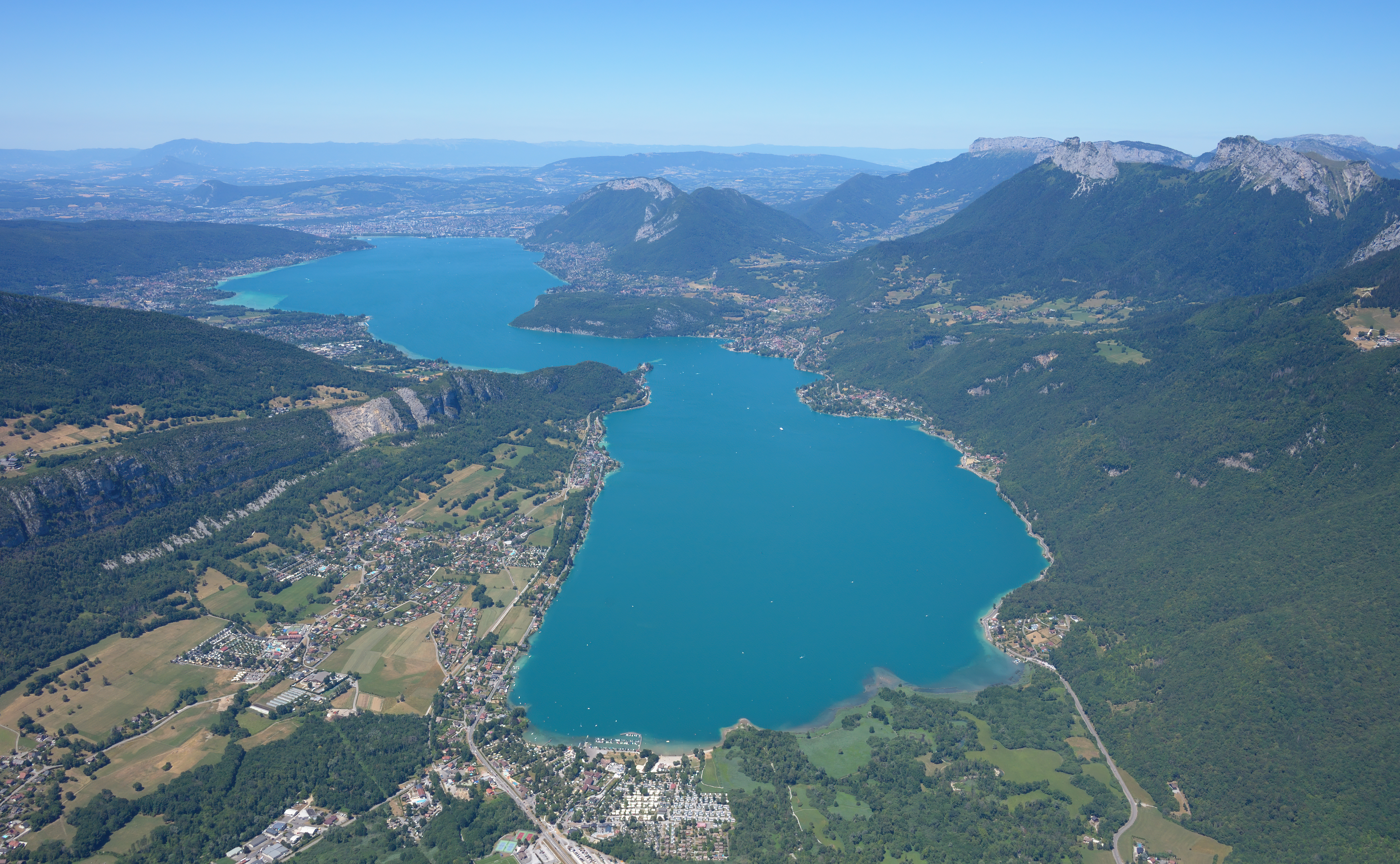
- Aerial view of Lake Annecy from the south

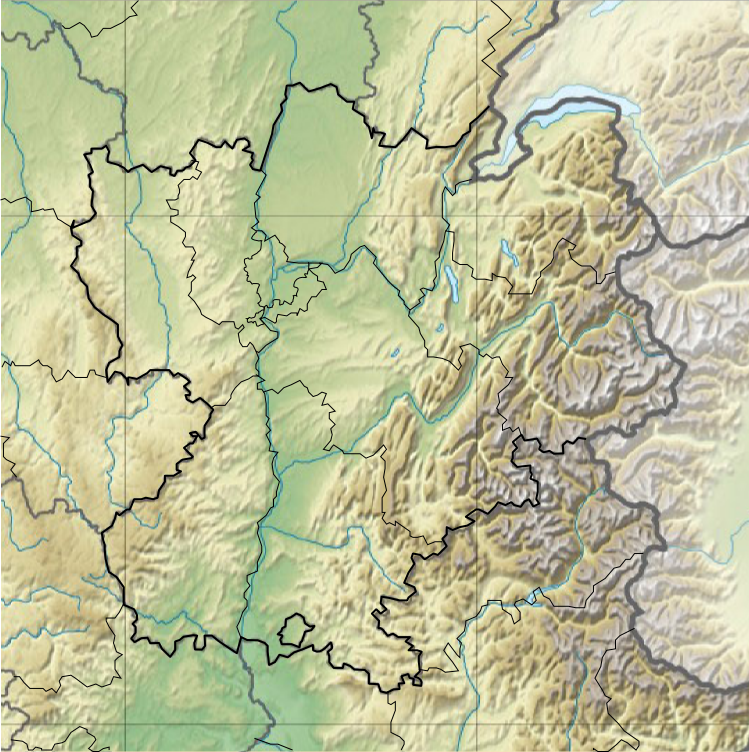
- Location within Alps Location within France Location within Rhône-Alpes
- Interactive map of Lake Annecy
- Location: Haute-Savoie
- Coordinates: 45°51′N 6°10′E
- Primary inflows: Ire, Eau morte, Laudon, Bornette and Biolon
- Primary outflows: Thiou
- Catchment area: 251 km^{2} (97 sq mi)
- Basin countries: France
- Max. length: 14.6 km (9.1 mi)
- Max. width: 3.2 km (2.0 mi)
- Surface area: 27.59 km^{2} (10.65 sq mi)
- Average depth: 41 m (135 ft)
- Max. depth: 82 m (269 ft)
- Water volume: 1,124.5 million cubic metres (911,600 acre⋅ft)
- Residence time: 4 years
- Surface elevation: 446.97 m (1,466.4 ft)
- Settlements: Annecy (see list)

Lake Annecy (French: Lac d'Annecy, [lak dansi]) is a perialpine lake in Haute-Savoie in France. It is named after the city of Annecy, which marks the start of the Thiou, Lake Annecy's outflow river.

The lake is at 1,465 feet (447 m) feet above sea level. At approximately 9 by 2 miles (14 by 3 km), it is the third-largest lake in France, after the Lac du Bourget and Lac de Grand-Lieu, if the French part of Lake Geneva, which is shared between Switzerland and France, is excluded. It is a popular tourist destination known for its swimming and water sports.

The lake was formed about 18,000 years ago, at the time the large alpine glaciers melted. It is fed by many small rivers from the surrounding mountains (Ire, Eau morte, Laudon, Bornette and Biolon) and a powerful underwater source, the Boubioz, at an 82-metre depth (269 ft).

== Cities and towns around the lake ==
- Annecy
- Veyrier-du-Lac
- Menthon-Saint-Bernard
- Talloires
- Doussard
- Duingt
- Saint-Jorioz
- Sévrier

A cycle path goes partially around Lake Annecy past Sevrier and St Jorioz to Ugine. It has an aim to reach Albertville. The lake is around 14 km long.

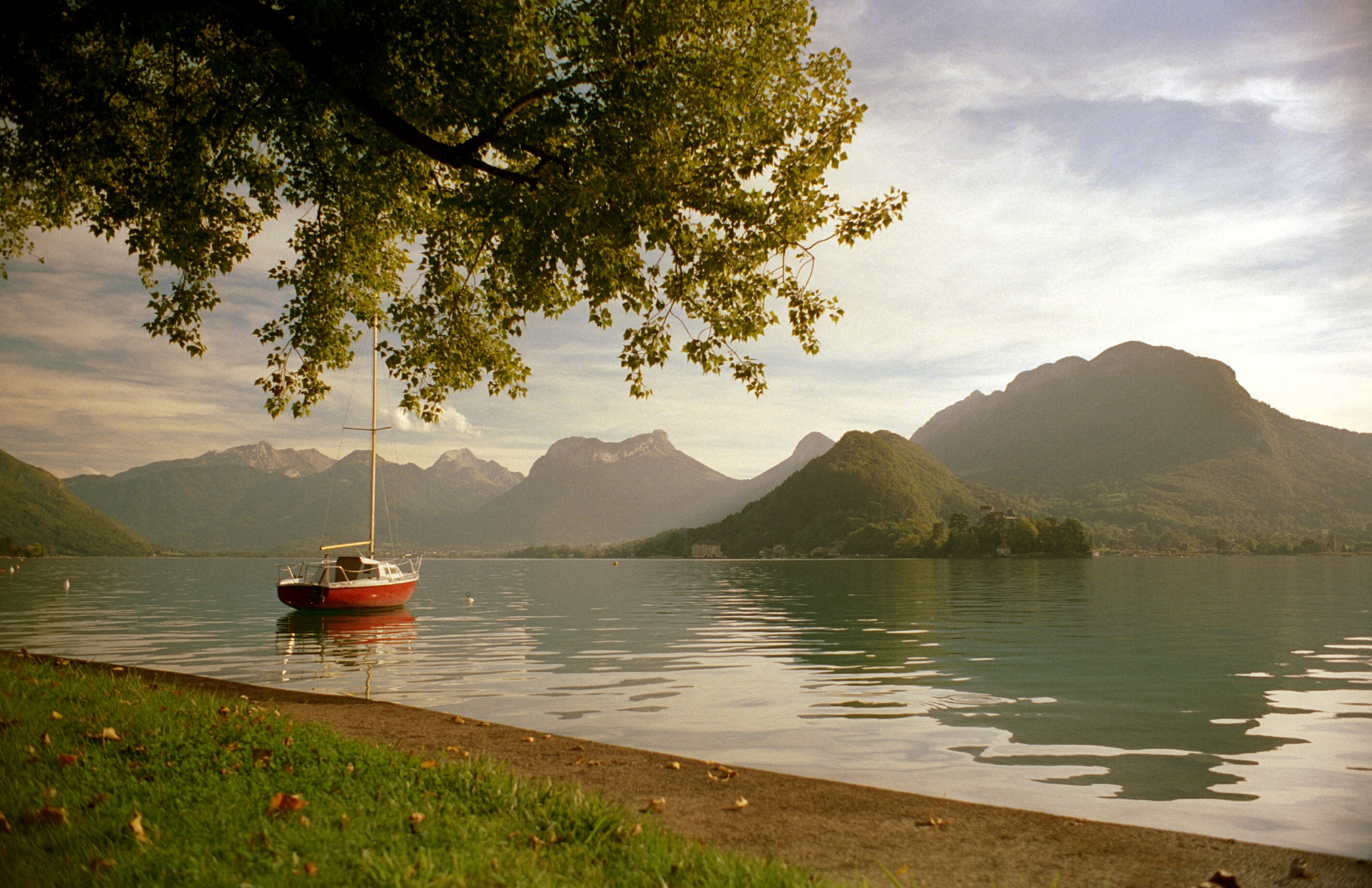
View of Lake Annecy from Talloires

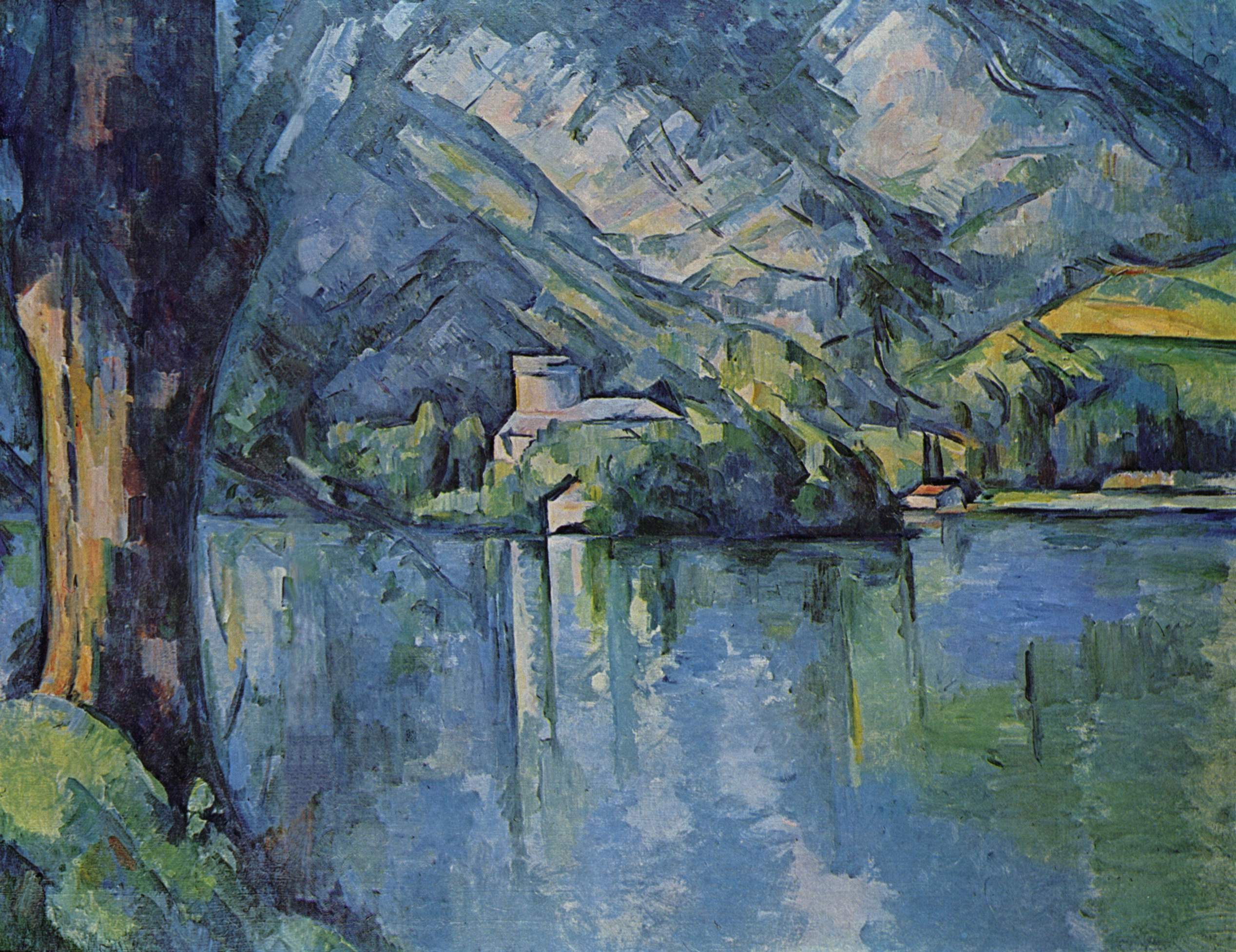
Paul Cézanne. Le lac bleu, 1896

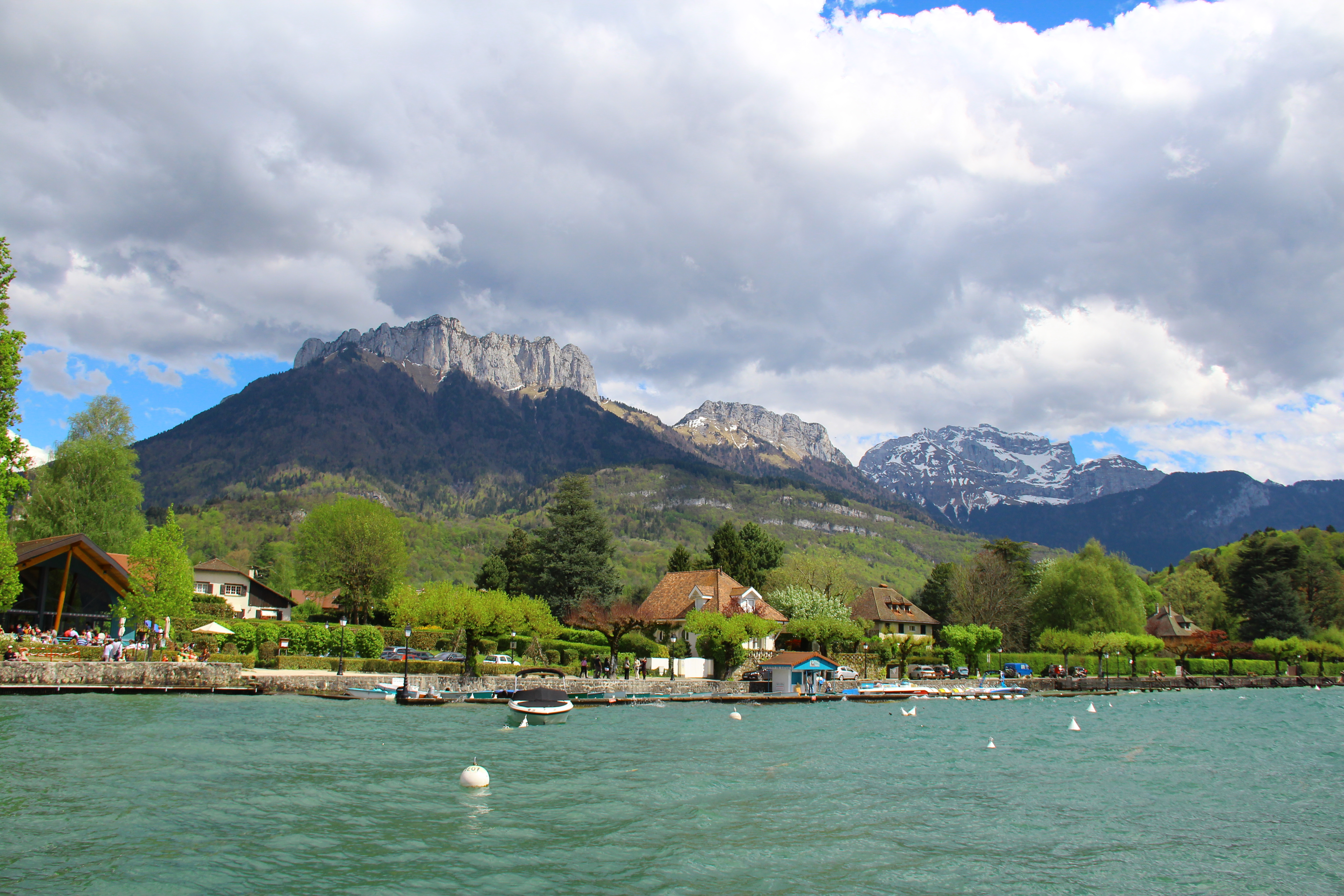
Lake Annecy, with the mountains of Dents de Lanfon, Lanfonnet and La Tournette in the background

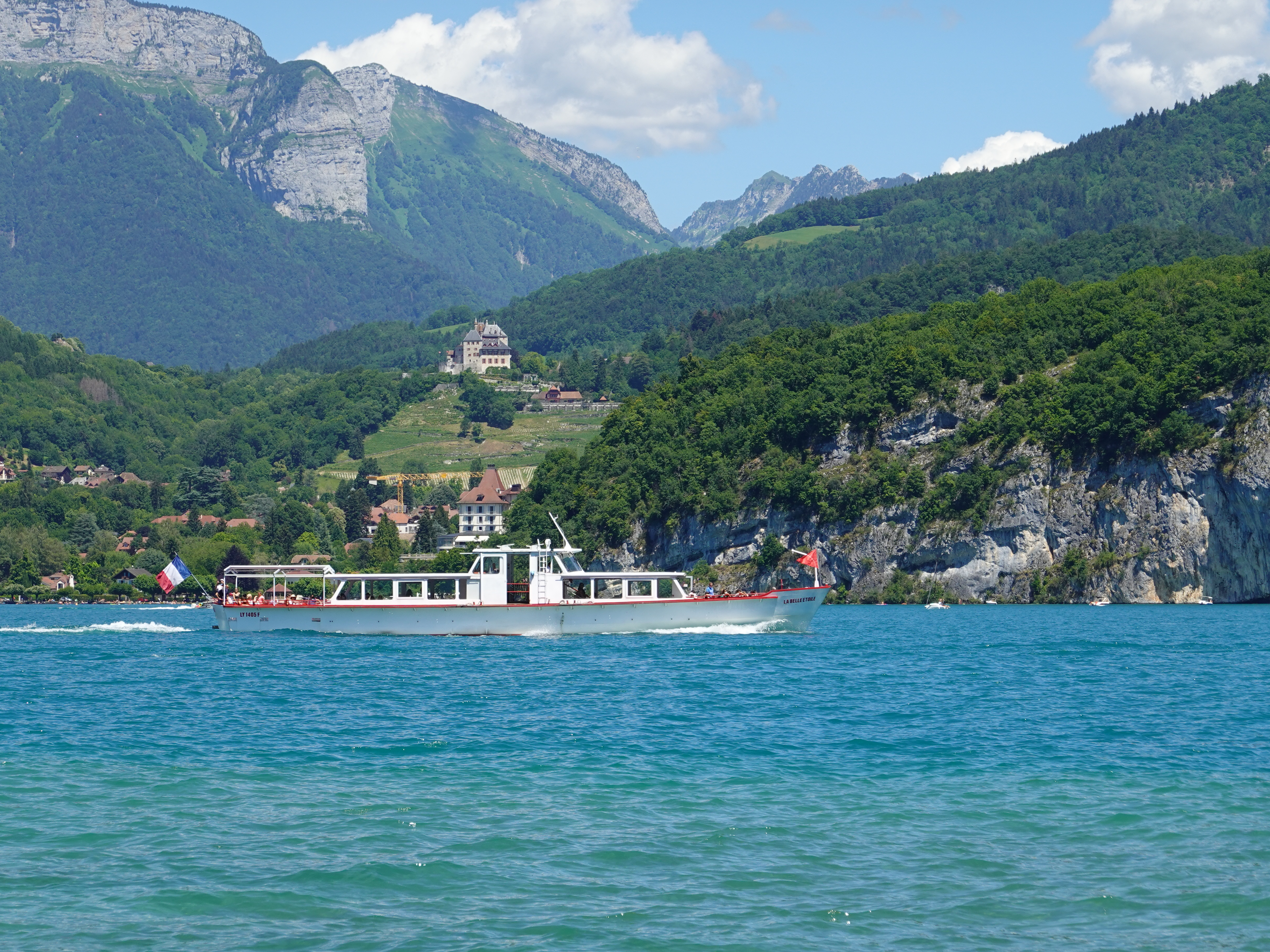
Ferry service on Lake Annecy, with the Château de Menthon-Saint-Bernard in the background

== See also ==
- 2023 Annecy stabbing
- Faverges
- Montmin
