= Haute-Savoie =

Department in Auvergne-Rhône-Alpes, France

Haute-Savoie Savouè d'Amont (Arpitan) Alta Savoia (Italian)
- Department
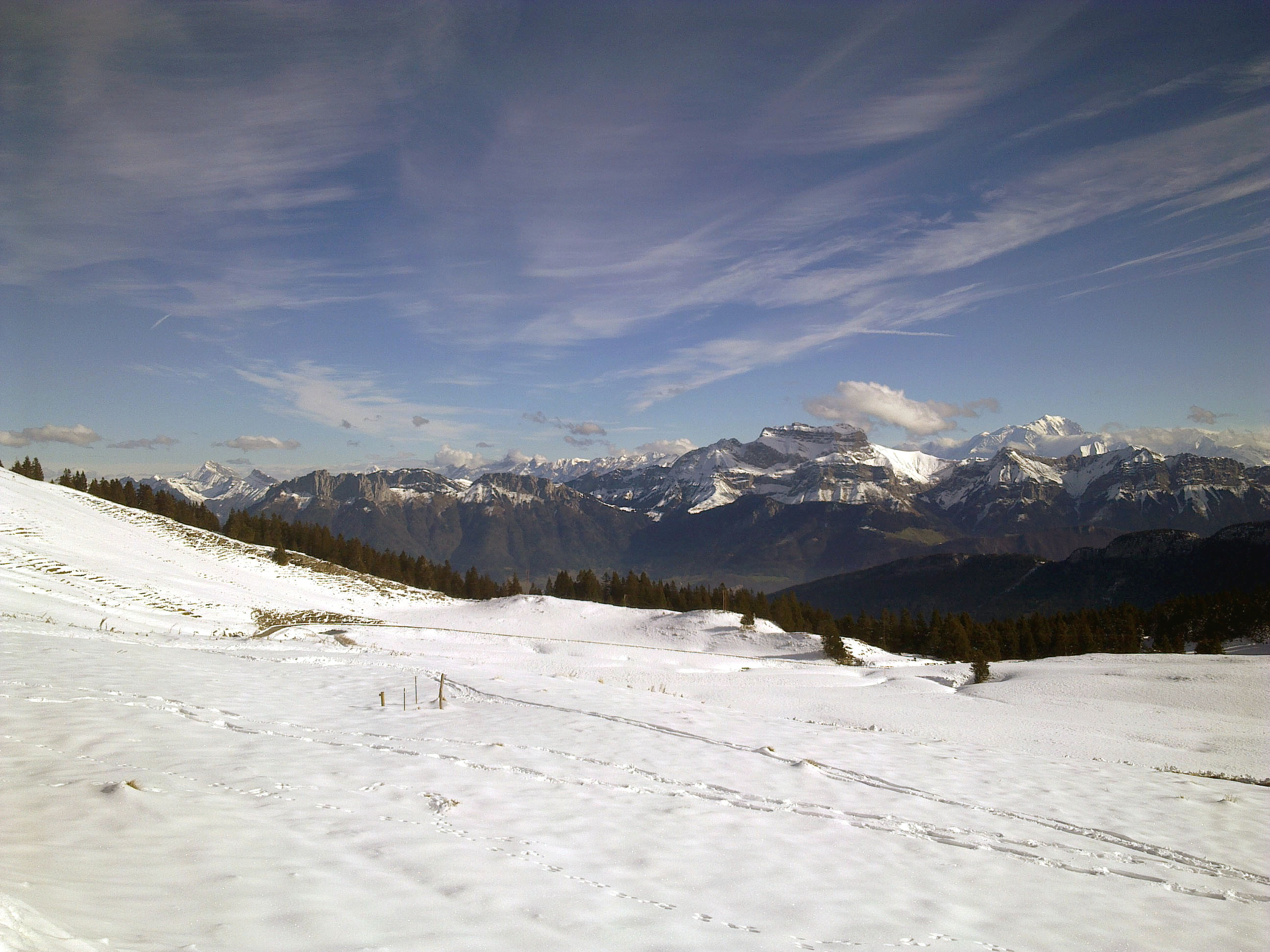
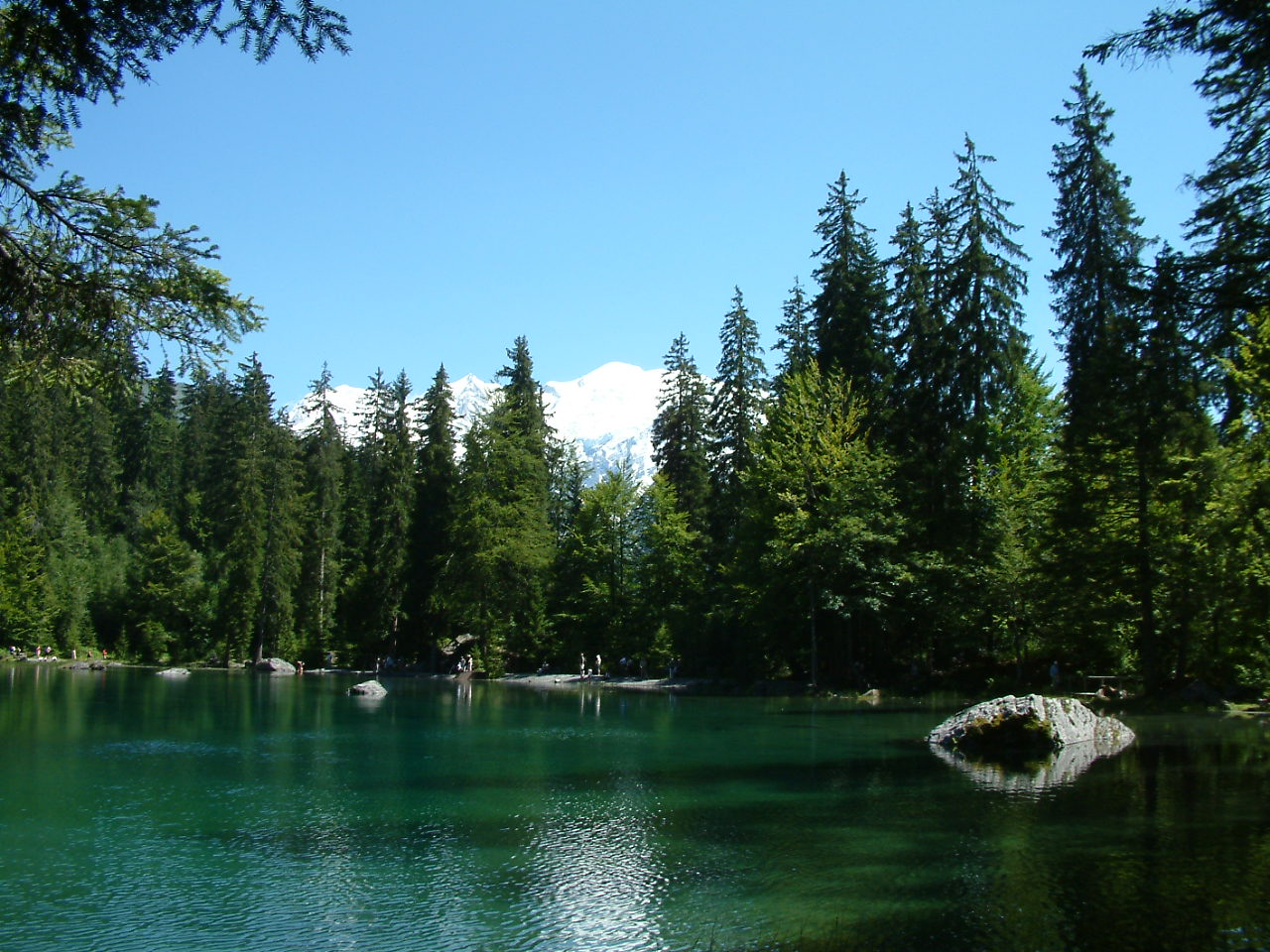
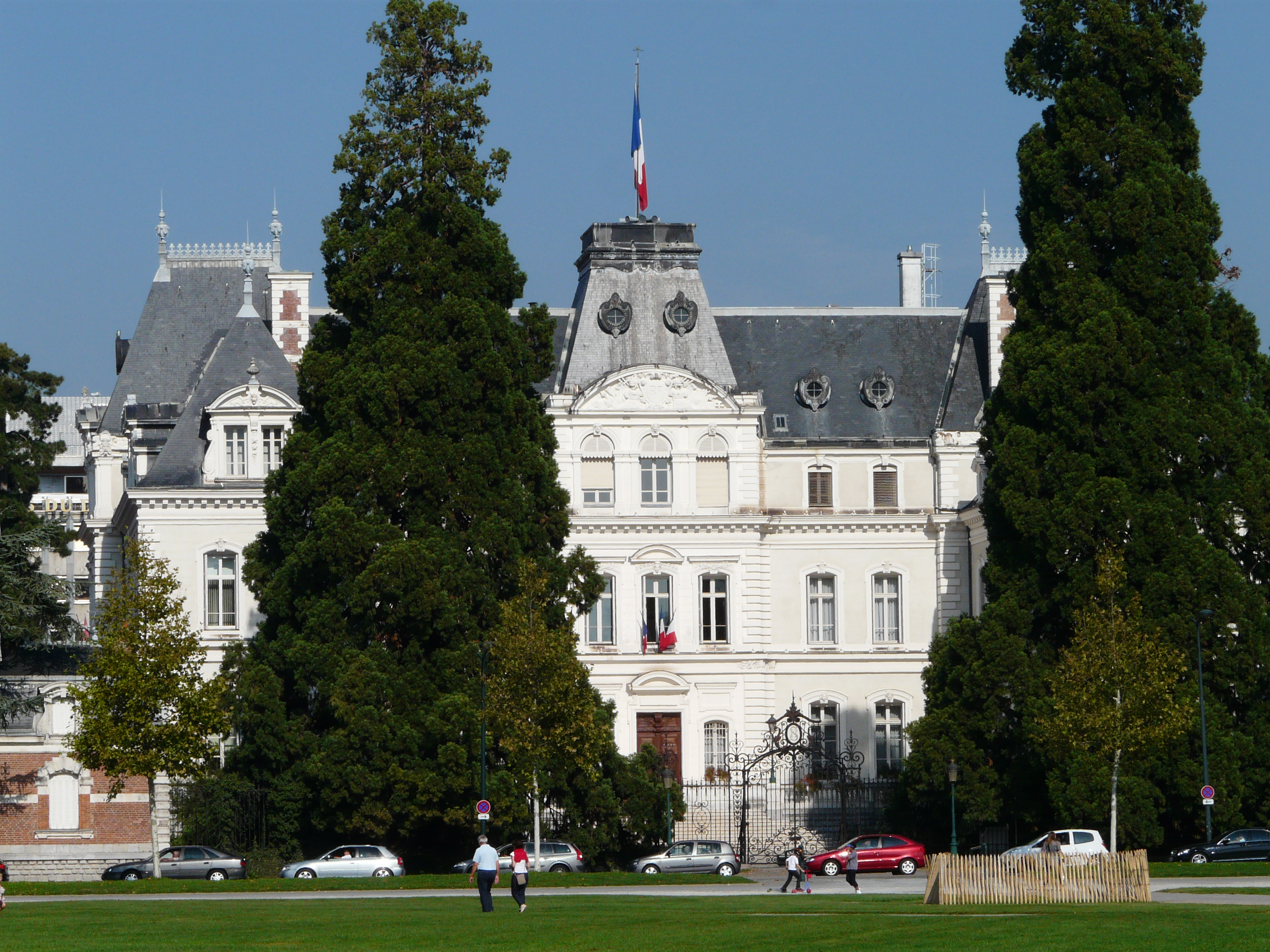
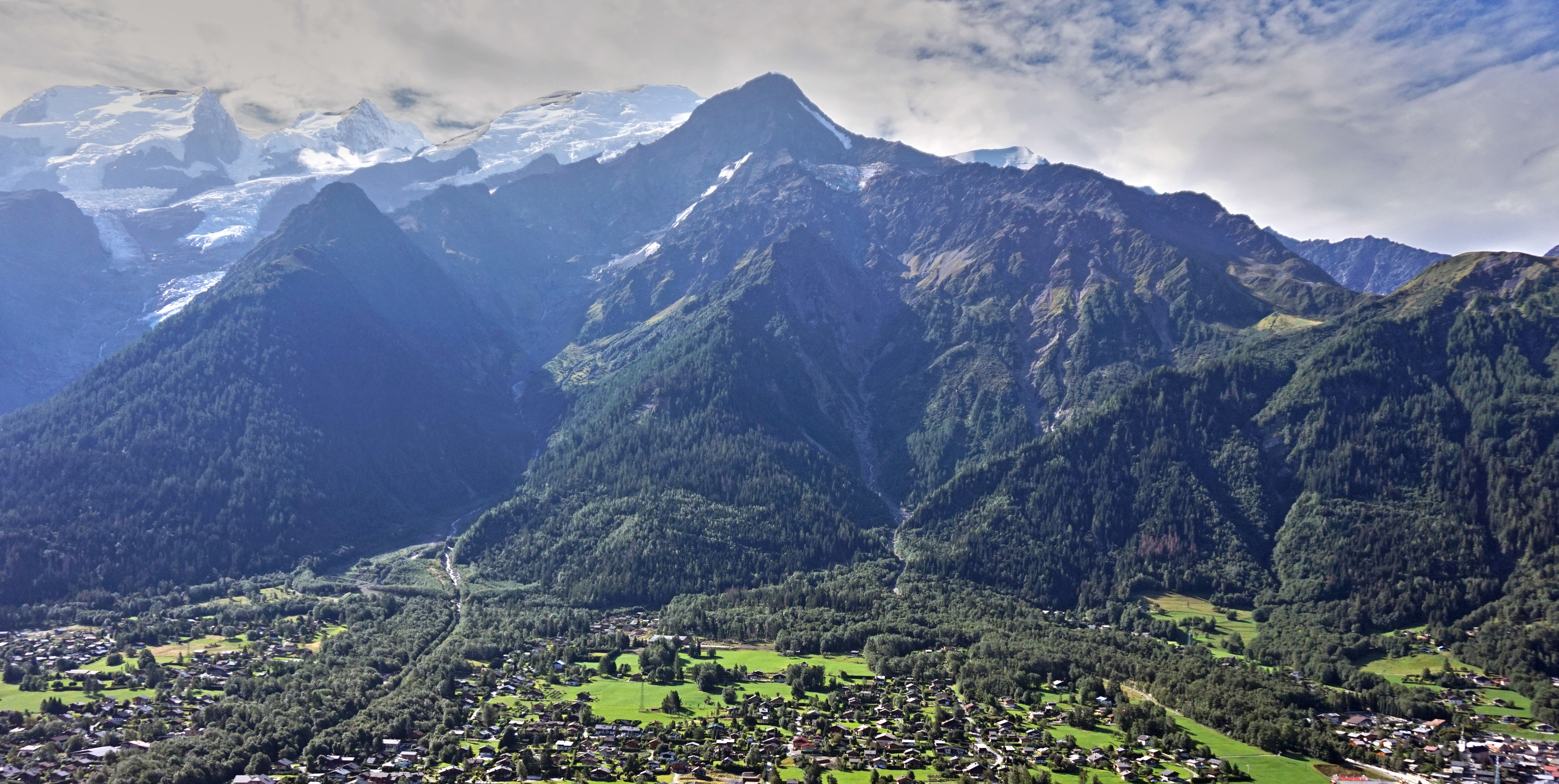
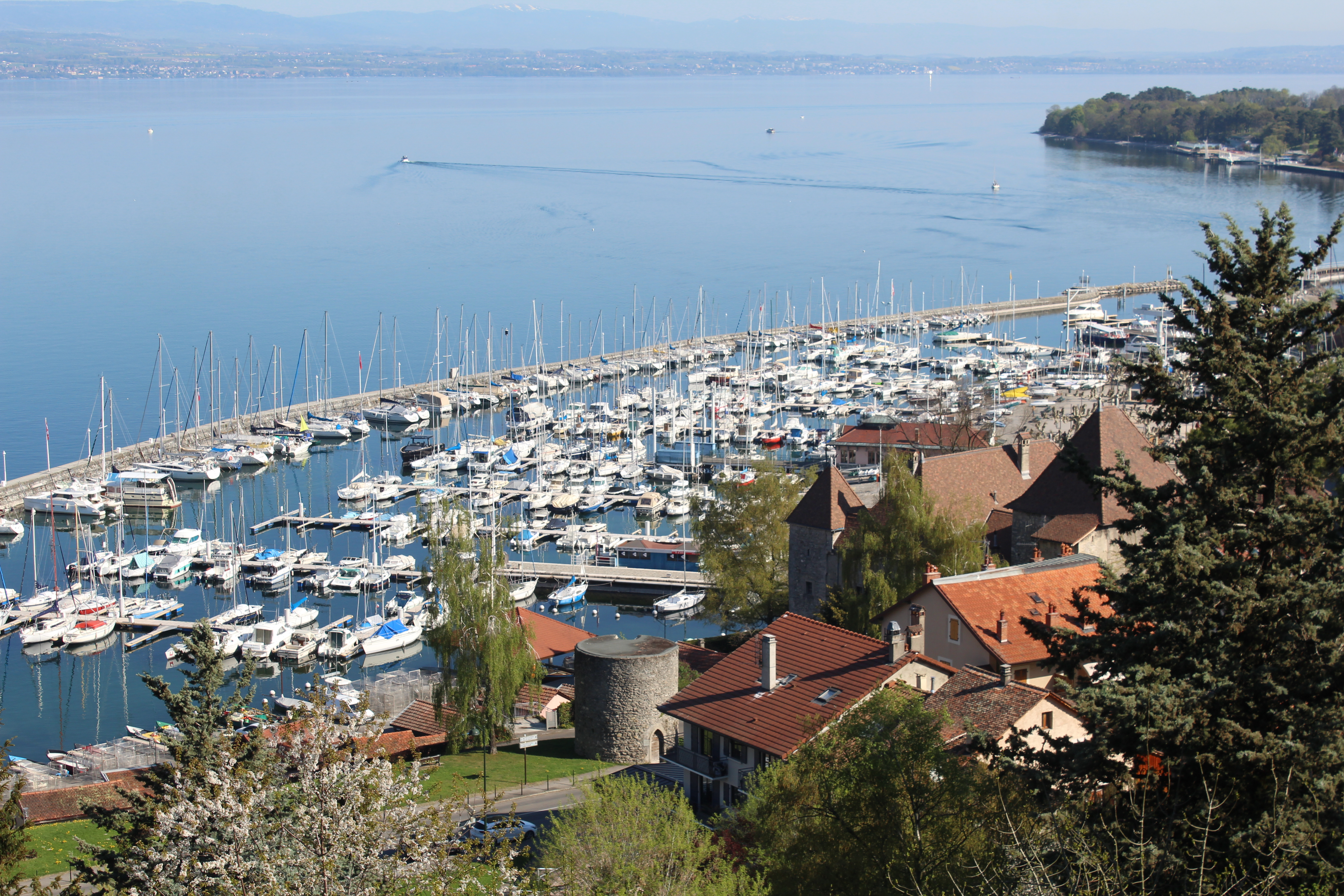
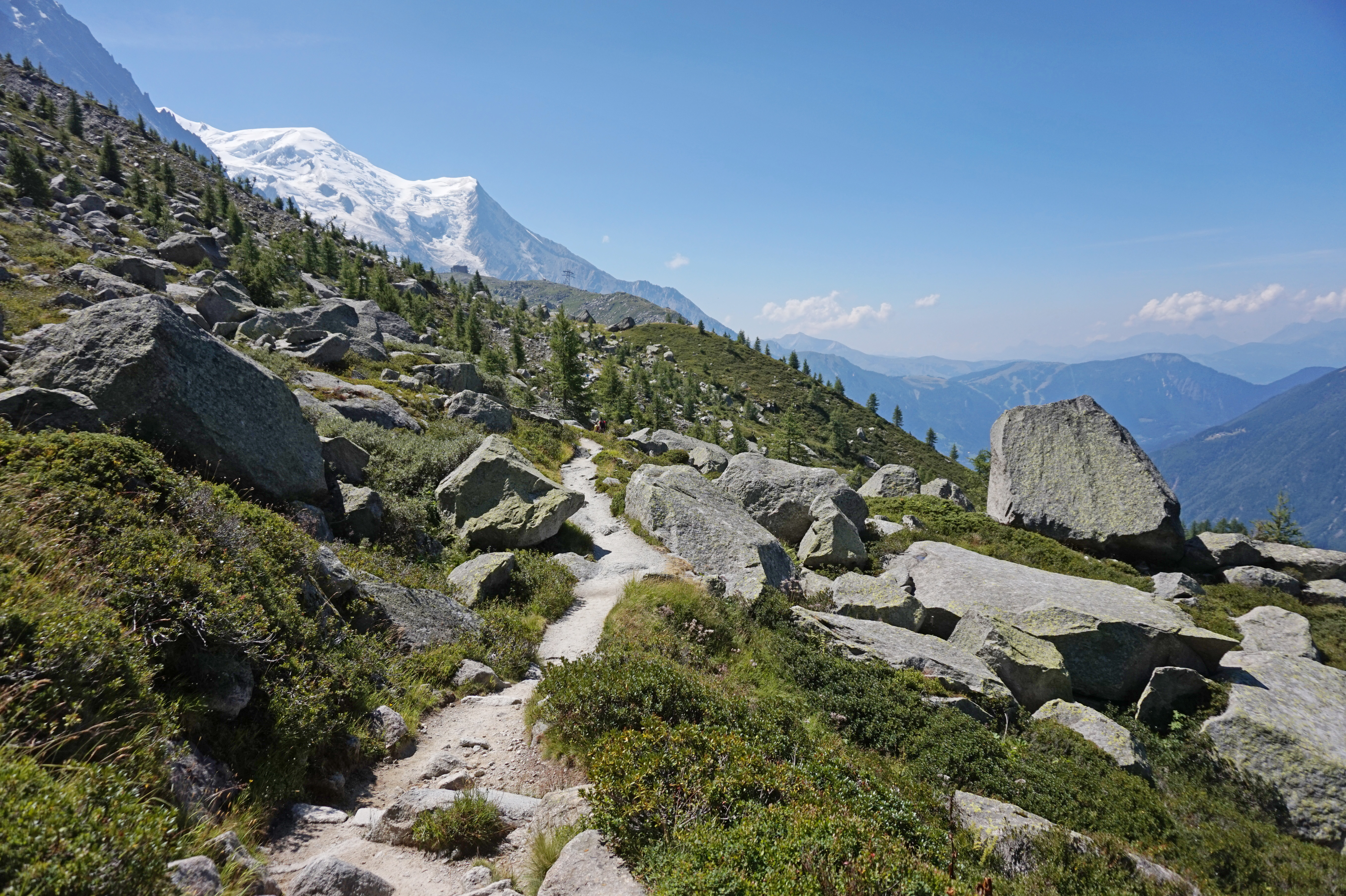
- From top down, left to right: Alps from Semnoz, Lac Vert in Passy, prefecture building in Annecy, a view of Les Houches, Thonon-les-Bains, landscape near Chamonix

- Logo

- Location of Haute-Savoie in France
- Coordinates: 46°00′N 06°20′E
- Country: France
- Region: Auvergne-Rhône-Alpes
- Prefecture: Annecy
- Subprefectures: Bonneville; Saint-Julien-en-Genevois; Thonon-les-Bains

Government
  - President of the Departmental Council: Martial Saddier (LR)

Area^{1}
  - Total: 4,388 km^{2} (1,694 sq mi)
- Elevation^{2}: 1,160 m (3,810 ft)
- Highest elevation: 4,810.40 m (15,782.2 ft)
- Lowest elevation: 250 m (820 ft)

Population (2023)
  - Total: 861,158
  - Rank: 27th
  - Density: 196.3/km^{2} (508.3/sq mi)
- Time zone: UTC+1 (CET)
  - Summer (DST): UTC+2 (CEST)
- ISO 3166 code: FR-74
- Department number: 74
- Arrondissements: 4
- Cantons: 17
- Communes: 279
- ^1 French Land Register data, which exclude estuaries and lakes, ponds and glaciers larger than 1 km^{2}^2 Inventaire forestier départemental, III^{e} inventaire 1998

Haute-Savoie (French pronunciation: [ot savwa]; Upper Savoy) (Note: Arpitan: Savouè d'Amont or Hiôta-Savouè; Italian: Alta Savoia; German: Obersavoyen or Hochsavoyen.) is a department in the Auvergne-Rhône-Alpes region of Southeastern France, bordering both Switzerland and Italy. Its prefecture is Annecy. To the north is Lake Geneva; to the south and southeast are Mont Blanc and the Aravis mountain range.

It holds its name from the Savoy historical region, as does the department of Savoie, located south of Haute-Savoie. In 2023, it had a population of 861,158. Its subprefectures are Bonneville, Saint-Julien-en-Genevois and Thonon-les-Bains. The French entrance to the Mont Blanc Tunnel into Italy is in Haute-Savoie. It is noted for winter sports; the first Winter Olympic Games were held at Chamonix in 1924.

== History ==
The historical region of Savoy was governed by the House of Savoy, the ruling dynasty of Savoy from 1032 to 1860. The Dukes of Savoy were rulers of the Savoy region from 1416 to 1720.

The territory occupied by modern Haute-Savoie and the adjoining department of Savoie became part of the Kingdom of Sardinia after the Treaty of Utrecht in 1713. Annexation of the region by France was formalised in the Treaty of Turin on March 24, 1860. Most of it was the Neutralized Zone of Savoy.

From November 1942 to September 1943, Haute-Savoie was subjected to military occupation by Fascist Italy. The Maquis des Glières (a band of Free French Resistance fighters who opposed the Nazi, Vichy and Milice regimes during World War II) operated from Haute-Savoie. In the winter of 1943–1944, German troops burned down around 500 farms in response to French Resistance activities.

== Politics ==
=== Departmental Council of Haute-Savoie ===
The Departmental Council of Haute-Savoie has 34 seats. As of 2020, fifteen councillors are part of the Haute-Savoie Union group (miscellaneous right), fourteen are part of the Avenir Haute-Savoie group (The Republicans) and five are part of the Union du Centre group (The Centrists). Martial Saddier had been President of the Departmental Council since 2021.

=== Representation in Paris ===
==== National Assembly ====
Constituency	Member	Party
Haute-Savoie's 1st	Véronique Riotton	RE
Haute-Savoie's 2nd	Danièle Carteron	RE
Haute-Savoie's 3rd	Antoine Valentin	UDR
Haute-Savoie's 4th	Virginie Duby-Muller	LR
Haute-Savoie's 5th	Anne-Cécile Violland	HOR
Haute-Savoie's 6th	Xavier Roseren	RE

==== Senate ====
Haute-Savoie sends three Senators to Parliament. Loïc Hervé and Cyril Pellevat were both elected in 2014; Sylviane Noël took office in 2018.

== Geography ==
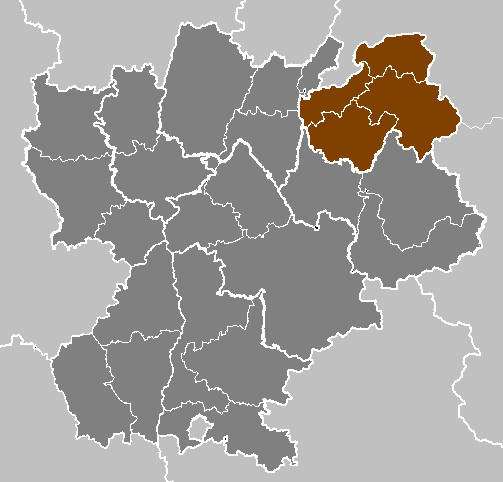
Haute-Savoie highlighted in brown in the former Rhône-Alpes region, with arrondissements outlined

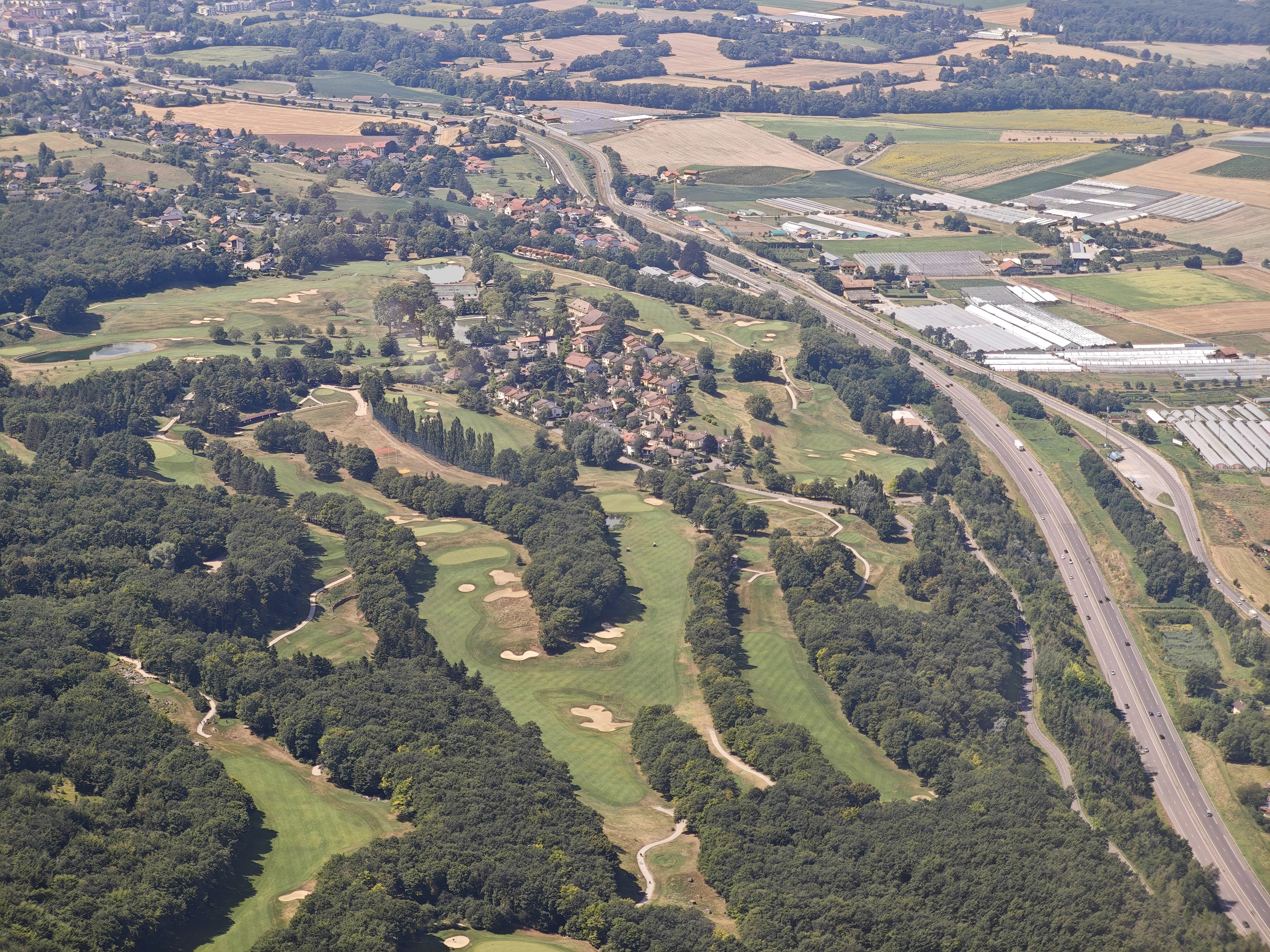
Aerial landscape of Haute-Savoie near the A40 motorway

Haute-Savoie comprises four arrondissements, divided into 279 communes and 17 cantons. To the north, it borders the Swiss canton of Geneva and Lake Geneva; to the east the Swiss canton of Valais and Italy's Aosta Valley; to the west the French department of Ain; and to the south the department of Savoie.

Haute-Savoie has the largest range of elevations of all the departments in France; the lowest point is 250 metres (820 ft) in the Rhône Valley, and the highest Mont Blanc at 4,810.40 metres (15,782.2 ft). Some of the world's best-known ski resorts are in Haute-Savoie.

The terrain of the department includes the Alpine Mont Blanc range; the French Prealps of the Aravis Range, the Chablais, Bornes and Bauges Alps; and the peneplains of Genevois haut-savoyard and Albanais (known collectively as L'Avant-pays savoyard). Its mountainous terrain makes mountain passes important to trade and economic life. Some of the most important are the Col de la Forclaz (which connects Chamonix to the canton of Valais) and the Mont Blanc Tunnel, linking Chamonix to Courmayeur in the Aosta Valley.

=== Forests ===
As of 1996, 178,624 hectares (441,390 acres) of Haute-Savoie is forested (38.8 percent of the total land area), compared to 34.4 percent for the Rhone-Alpes region and 27.1 percent for France as a whole. Of the forested area 141,063 hectares (348,570 acres) (79 percent) is managed for timber and other forest products, with the remaining 37,561 hectares (92,820 acres) having no commercial value or used for outdoor recreation.

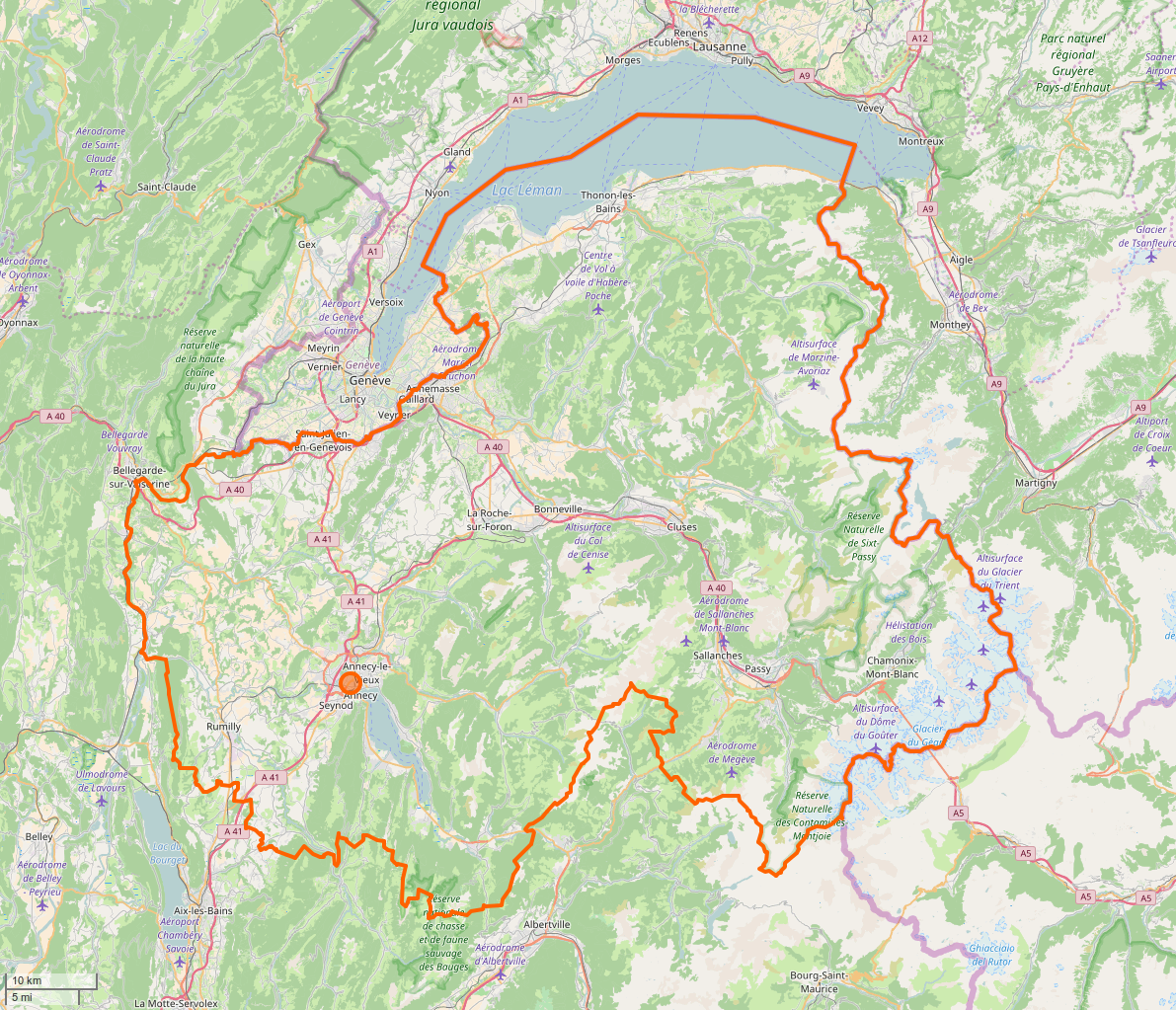
Map of Haute-Savoie

National nature reserves are designated by the French government as areas where an outstanding natural heritage is present in both rare and typical areas in terms of species and geology. Management is charged to local organizations, with direction and evaluation focusing on long-term protection for future generations and environmental education. Of the 37,561 hectares (92,820 acres) of land not managed for timber, Haute-Savoie has nine national nature reserves totaling 24,542 hectares (60,640 acres).

- Aiguilles Rouges National Nature Reserve – 3,276 hectares (8,100 acres)
- Bout du Lac d'Annecy National Nature Reserve – 84 hectares (210 acres)
- Carlaveyron National Nature Reserve – 599 hectares (1,480 acres)
- Contamines-Montjoie National Nature Reserve – 5,500 hectares (14,000 acres)
- Delta de la Dranse National Nature Reserve – 539.7 hectares (1,334 acres)
- Passy National Nature Reserve – 2,000 hectares (4,900 acres)
- Roc de Chère National Nature Reserve – 68.24 hectares (168.6 acres)
- Sixt-Passy National Nature Reserve – 9,200 hectares (23,000 acres)
- Vallon de Bérard National Nature Reserve – 3,276 hectares (8,100 acres)

=== Lakes ===
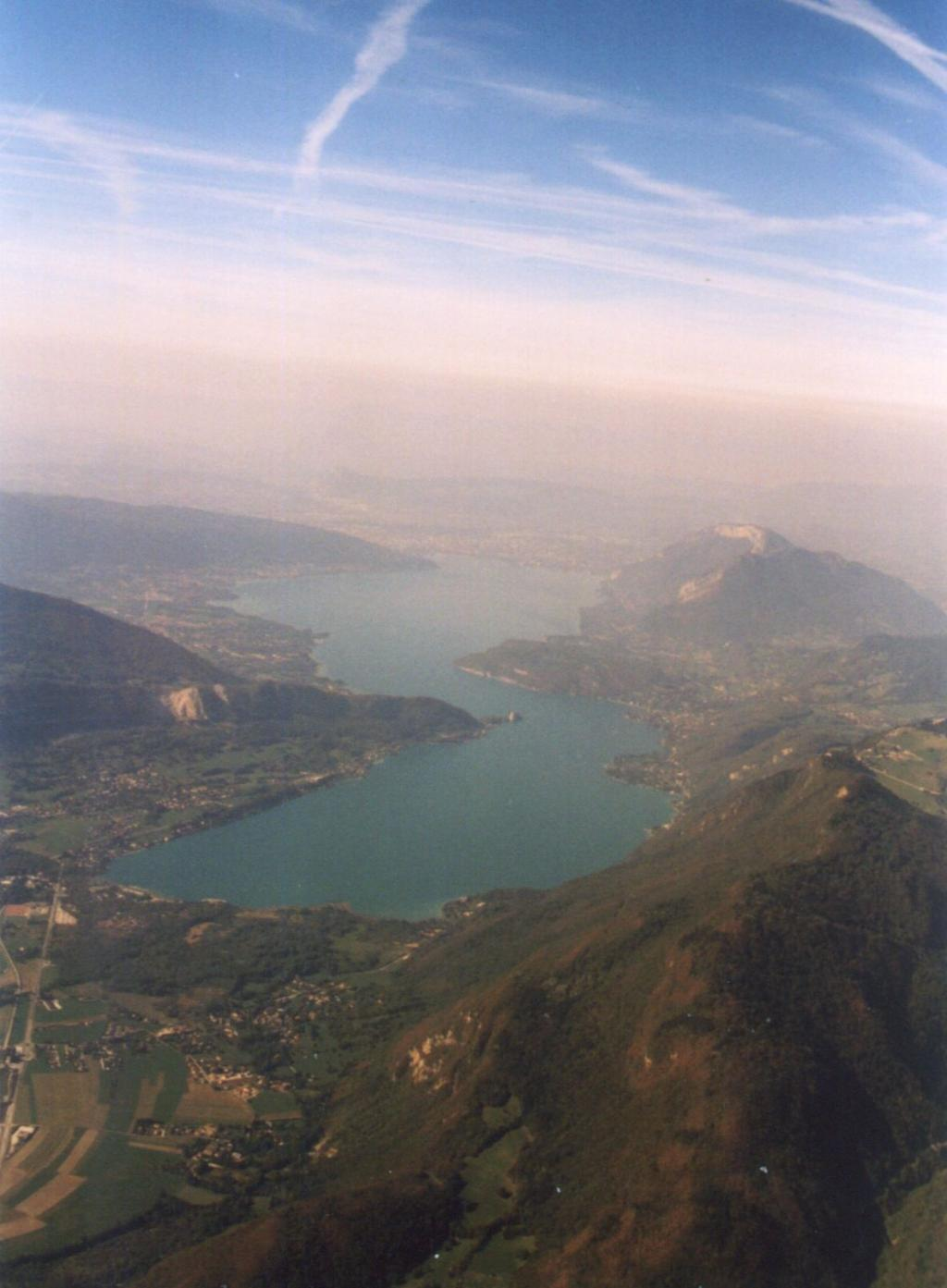
Aerial view of Lake Annecy from the southeast

Haute-Savoie has significant freshwater resources. Lake Annecy is a major attraction, along with the town of Évian-les-Bains, perhaps the best-known town on the French shore of Lake Geneva, and known worldwide for its Evian mineral water. Haute-Savoie is entirely within the watershed of the Rhone.

== Demographics ==
Population development since 1861:

Historical population

Year	Pop.	±% p.a.
1861	267,496	—
1872	273,027	+0.19%
1881	274,087	+0.04%
1891	268,471	−0.21%
1901	263,803	−0.18%
1911	255,137	−0.33%
1921	235,668	−0.79%
1931	252,794	+0.70%
1936	259,961	+0.56%
1946	270,565	+0.40%
1954	293,852	+1.04%

Year	Pop.	±% p.a.
1962	329,230	+1.43%
1968	378,550	+2.35%
1975	447,795	+2.43%
1982	494,505	+1.43%
1990	568,286	+1.75%
1999	631,679	+1.18%
2007	706,708	+1.41%
2012	756,501	+1.37%
2017	807,360	+1.31%
2023	861,158	+1.08%

=== Principal towns ===
The most populous commune is Annecy, the prefecture. As of 2023, there are 7 communes with more than 15,000 inhabitants:

Commune	Population (2023)
Annecy	132,117
Thonon-les-Bains	37,928
Annemasse	37,628
Cluses	17,795
Sallanches	17,319
Rumilly	16,442
Saint-Julien-en-Genevois	16,222

=== Education and research ===
The research sector in Haute-Savoie filed 201 patents in 2000. It is represented by:

- Laboratory for Particle Physics in Annecy-le-Vieux
- Technology Center Engineering Industries (CETIM)
- Research laboratories related to Polytech Savoie, ESIA and Savoy University
- Technical center for screw-machining industry (CTDEC) in Cluses
- The Thésame - mechatronics and management

== Economy ==
=== Agriculture ===
In 2006 approximately 142,000 hectares (350,000 acres) of land was suitable for agriculture, of which 33,600 hectares (83,000 acres) (24 percent) was arable land suitable for market gardening, cultivation or pasture; 600 hectares (1,500 acres) was orchards; 300 hectares (740 acres) was vineyards, and 108,300 hectares (268,000 acres) was alpine tundra or grasses. There were 4,450 farmers in 1999, 4,800 farmers and over 1,700 full-time farm employees at the end of 2006. In 1999, crop production was valued at €71.5 million and animal production at €165.4 million.

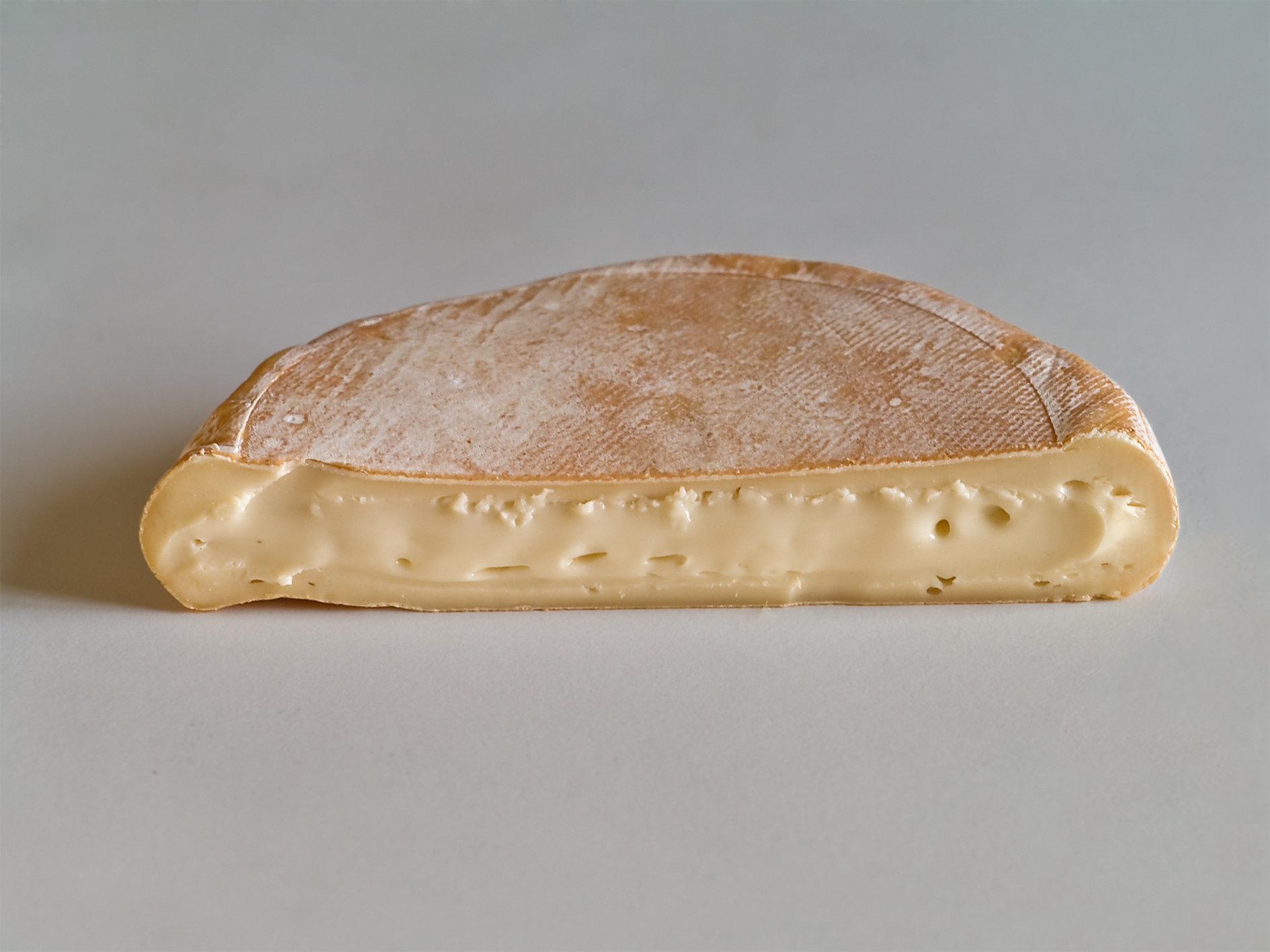
Reblochon cheese

Dairy production is a large part of the Haute-Savoie economy, earning €117.2 million in 2006 and representing 74 percent of the net animal-product worth. Cattle earned €29.7 million. Cheese production (by variety) in 1999 (except as noted) was:

- Reblochon – 16,950 tons
- Tomme de Savoie – 5,500 tons
- Emmental – 3,000 tons (2006); 4,050 tons in 1999
- Raclette raw milk – 2,000 tons
- Abondance – 700 tons
- Tome des Bauges – 650 tons

=== Crafts ===
In late 2000 crafts occupied 15 percent of the workforce, or 28,443 employees and 1,922 apprentices. The 11,951 companies represented on the Répertoire des Métiers (Trade Index) were divided into:

- Food: 955 companies
- Construction: 4,924
- Production: 2,834
- Services: 3,238

=== Construction and public works ===
In late December 2000, building construction and public works included 13,867 employees in 4,838 companies as follows:

- Construction: 20 percent
- Decoration, electricity, plastering, painting: 70 percent
- Public works: 10 percent

=== Trade ===
In late December 2000, the trade sector accounted for 33,994 employees in 9,351 companies as follows:

- Tourism, culture and recreation: 23.7 percent
- Food and restaurants: 22.5 percent
- Hygiene and health: 15.2 percent
- Service: 14.3 percent
- Cars, motorcycles, bicycles: 13.1 percent
- Household equipment, home appliances: 11.2 percent

=== Retail ===
In late 2006, the département had 600 commercial establishments in over 300 square metres (3,200 ft^{2}) (for a total area of 705,419 square metres (7,593,070 ft^{2})), including:

- 13 hypermarkets (78,105 square metres (840,720 ft^{2}))
- 92 supermarkets (112,844 square metres (1,214,640 ft^{2}))
- 24 maxidiscounts (17,600 square metres (189,000 ft^{2}))
- 6 department and variety stores (14,640 square metres (157,600 ft^{2}))
- 465 other stores (482,230 square metres (5,190,700 ft^{2}))

From 1998 to 2005, 65 new supermarkets were built for an area totaling 50,000 square metres (540,000 ft^{2}). The average expenditure per capita in 2006 was €21,706. With the 2004–2007 rise of the euro, Swiss customer traffic decreased five or six percent (Swiss shoppers make up half the shoppers in the Genève–Savoyard district). At the end of 2006, traditional small businesses (less than 300 square metres (3,200 ft^{2})) represented 84 percent of businesses and 40 percent of retail space.

=== Companies ===
4,301 companies were established in 2004 in Haute-Savoie: nearly 80 percent in the service sector, with a high percentage offering service to individuals (hotels, restaurants, recreational, cultural, sports, personal and household services). This accounted for 21.6 percent of new businesses. The most active sectors were real estate (up 24 percent), construction (up 15.4 percent), business services (up 12.4 percent) and the food industry (up 10 percent).

In 1999, Haute-Savoie had 2,779 industrial companies producing 13.60 percent of all business income.

==== Companies in Haute-Savoie ====
- Food: Entremont, Evian (mineral water), Cereal Partners France, La Gerbe Savoyarde, France, Decoration, Besnier, Fruity
- Chemistry-Pharmacy-Medical: Labcatal, Nicholas Roche, Pierre Fabre Galderma, Ivoclar, Corneal, SNCI, Anthogyr
- Commerce: Provencia, Botanic
- Electrical and electronic: Chauvin-Arnoux, DAV, Label, Amphenol Socapex, Cartier, Varilac CEB
- Mechanical equipment: Dassault, adixen Vacuum Products, Bosch Rexroth, Union Pump-Guinard Pumps (Group Textron)
- Home, household equipment: Tefal, Scaime Bourgeois, Mobalpa, Somfy
- Personal items: S.T. Dupont, Rexam Reboul, Gay, Maped, Pilot
- Data: Sopra, Cross Systems
- Machine tools and special machines: Stäubli, Prosys, Mach 1, Techmeta (Bodycote), Wirth and Gruffat, Mecasonic, Almo
- Mechanics: SNR Bearings, Parker Hannifin, Glacier Vandervell, Invensys, Eurodec, Frank and Pignard, Bouverat, Nicomatic, ZF, Sandvik, Rossignol Technology
- Metals and materials: PSB Industries, Pechiney Rhenalu, Fonlem Lachenal
- Plastics: Veka, SMPI, Decoplast
- Sport and leisure goods: Salomon (skiing), Mavic, Dynastar, Millet, Fusalp, Eider
- Other: Velsol France, Mecalac, ABMT (Bodycote)

Screw-cutting is a precision parts-machining industry, and Haute-Savoie generates the bulk of French screws. Firms engaged in screw-cutting are major employers in the department. While the automotive industry is the principal client, firms also service the electronics, household-appliance and medical sectors.

Arve Industries is part of 67 "competitiveness clusters" created in 2005. The cluster is dedicated to mechatronics and includes 60,000 industrial jobs in over 280 companies (primarily small), 1,200 researchers and 250 patents in 2002. Among the projects supported by the cluster is inertial tolerancing, a new approach in evaluating the quality of machined parts. Based on the Taguchi loss function, inertia is defined by its deviation from its target. Inertial tolerancing is a research-and-development program supported by the cluster for its member companies. It is led by a research team from the Symme Laboratory of the University of Savoie and the CTDEC (Centre Technique du Decolletage). The publication of the French standard NFX 04-008 demonstrates the relevance of topics covered by the cluster.

Other programs involve the production of clean parts (4P project), developing new models of customer-supplier relationships to improve the effectiveness of simultaneous engineering tasks, and development of the international visibility of the cluster and its members. The companies concerned are involved with industrial mechanics, precision engineering, precision turning and sub-assemblies and mechanical assemblies, often associated with integrating technologies such as plastics, electronics and hydraulics. Markets served by member companies of the cluster include transport (cars, trucks, rail and air), production and distribution of electricity, hydraulics (gas or liquid, high-pressure vacuum), medical and health-related.

=== Services ===
In late December 2000, the service sector employed 75,768 people in 11,129 companies in:

- Hotels and restaurants – 26.5 percent
- Real estate activities – 24.6 percent
- Consulting and assistance – 14.0 percent
- Transportation – 6.1 percent
- Financial activities – 6.2 percent

=== Tourism ===
As of late December 2000, the tourism sector had a total of 635,000 beds divided as follows:

- 1,250 – Rural lodgings
- 803 – Hotels
- 453 – Guest rooms
- 191 – Campsites
- 70 – Bed-and-breakfasts
- 40 – Mountain huts

In 1999 there were 37.9 million overnight stays: 56 percent in winter and 44 percent during the rest of the year.

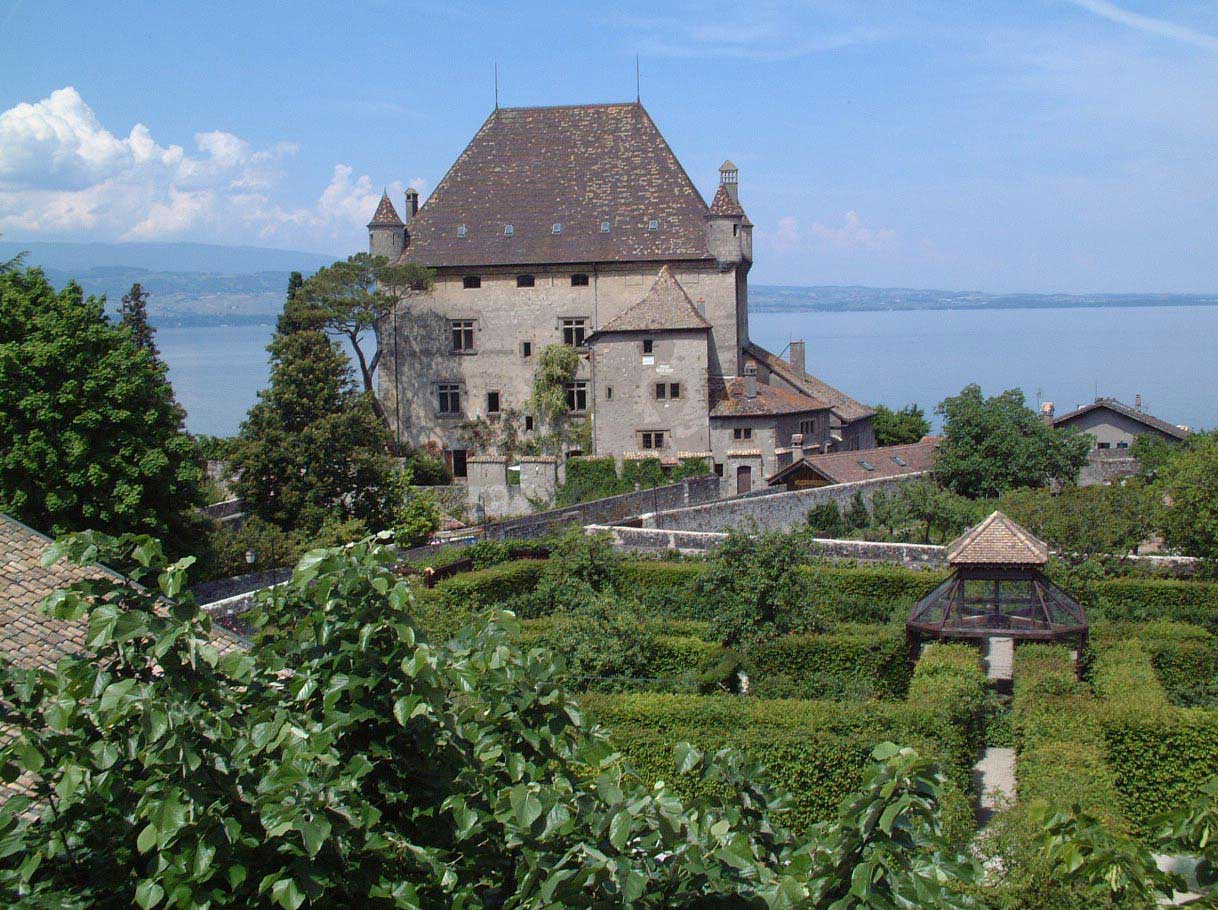
Château d'Yvoire in Yvoire with a view on Lake Geneva

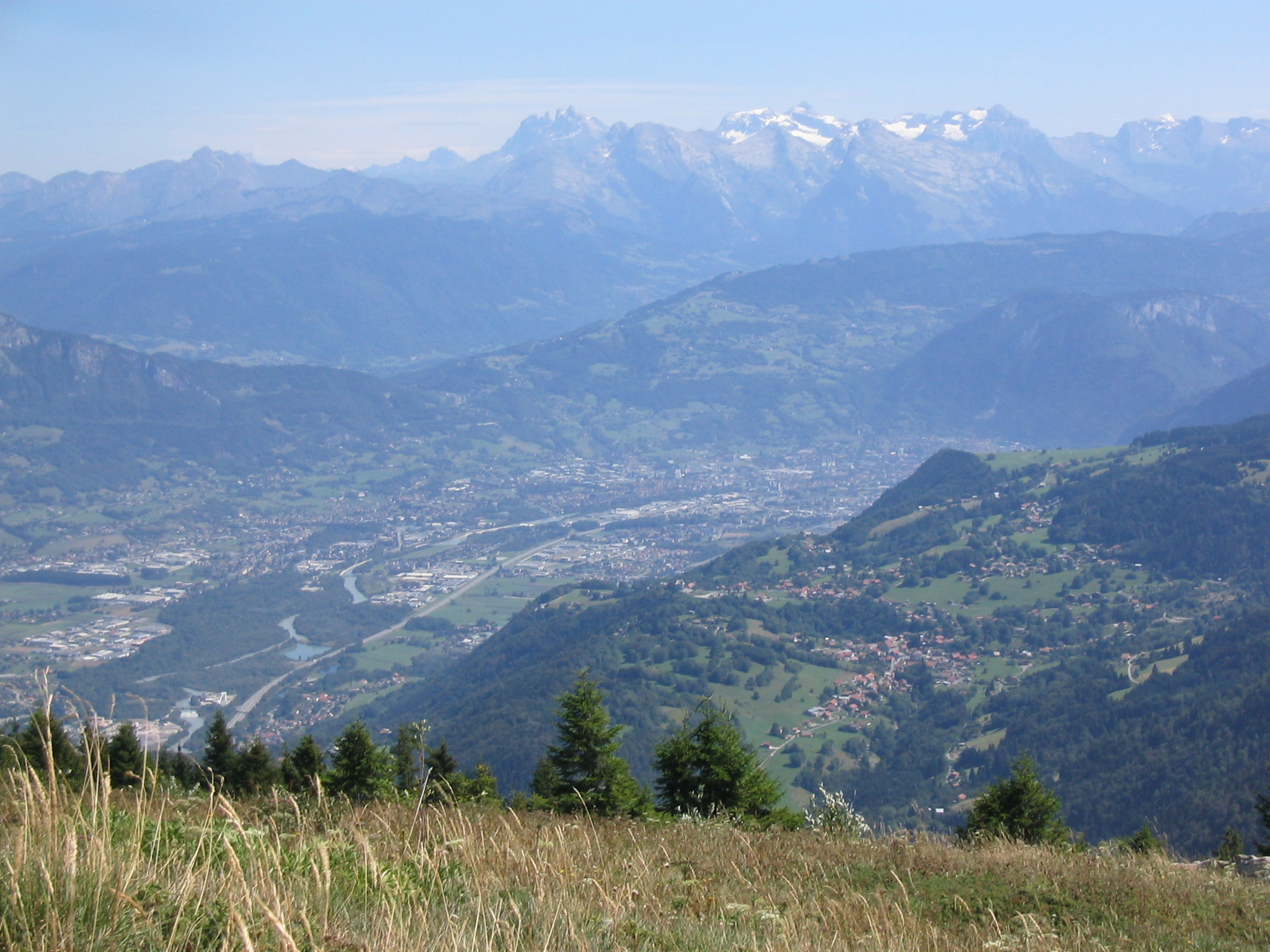
Arve Valley and the town of Cluses

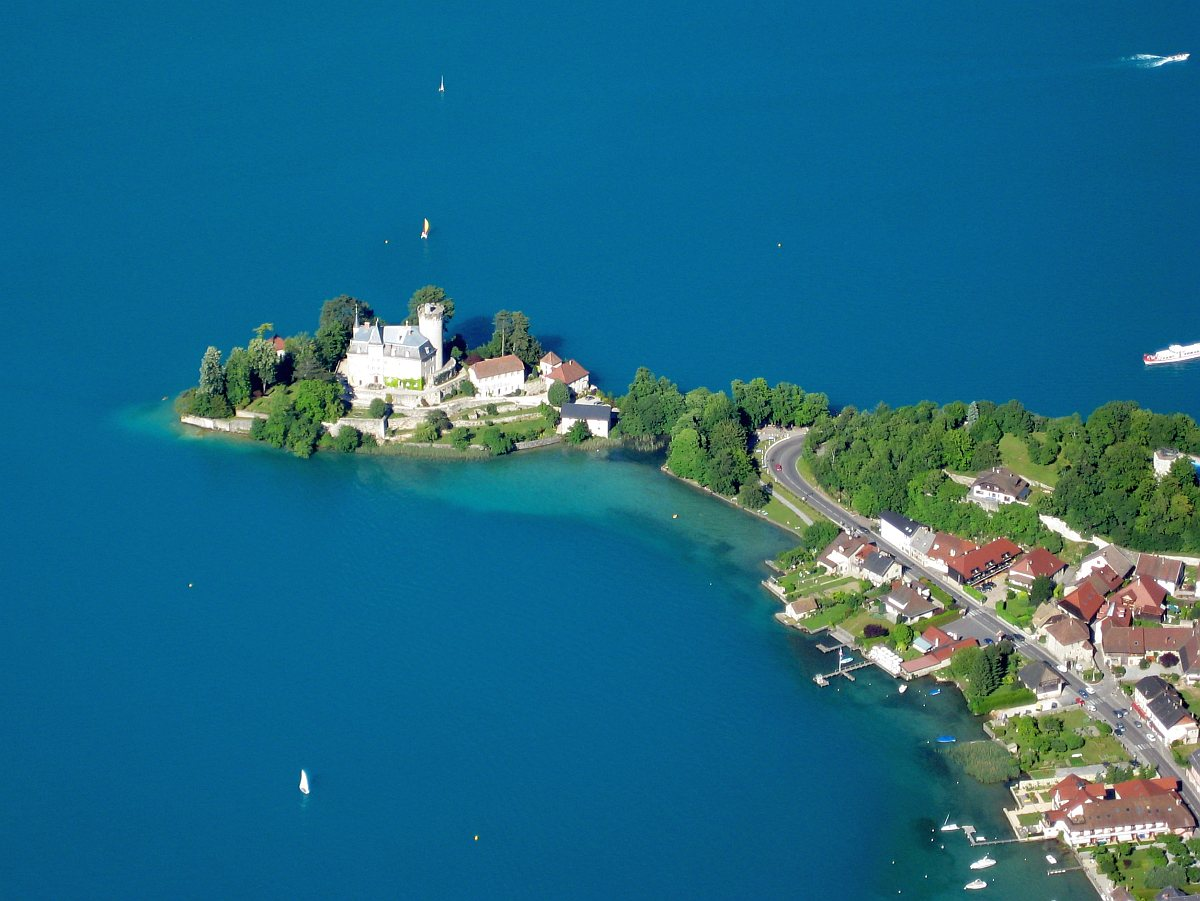
Château de Châteauvieux in Duingt on Lake Annecy

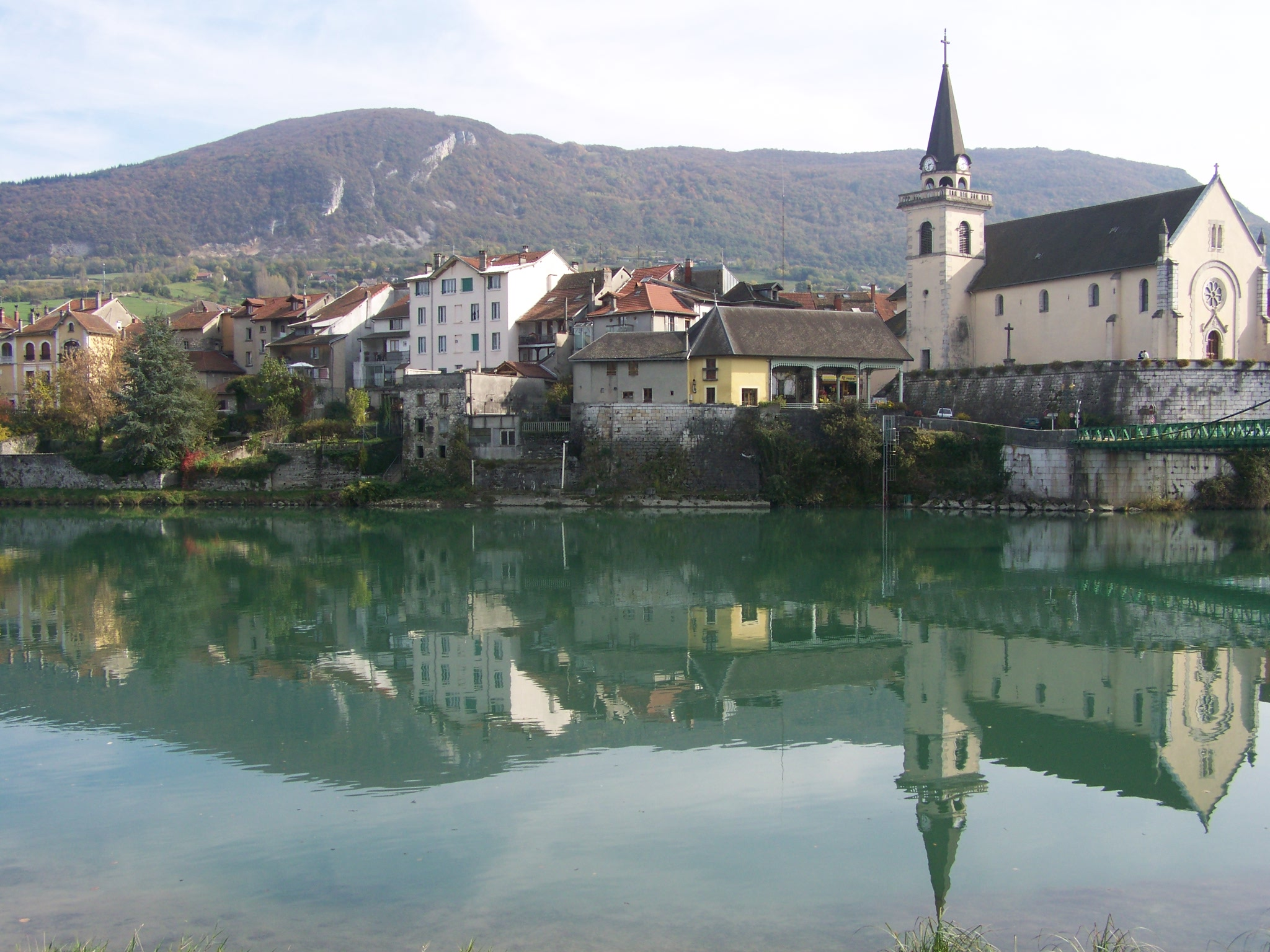
Seyssel

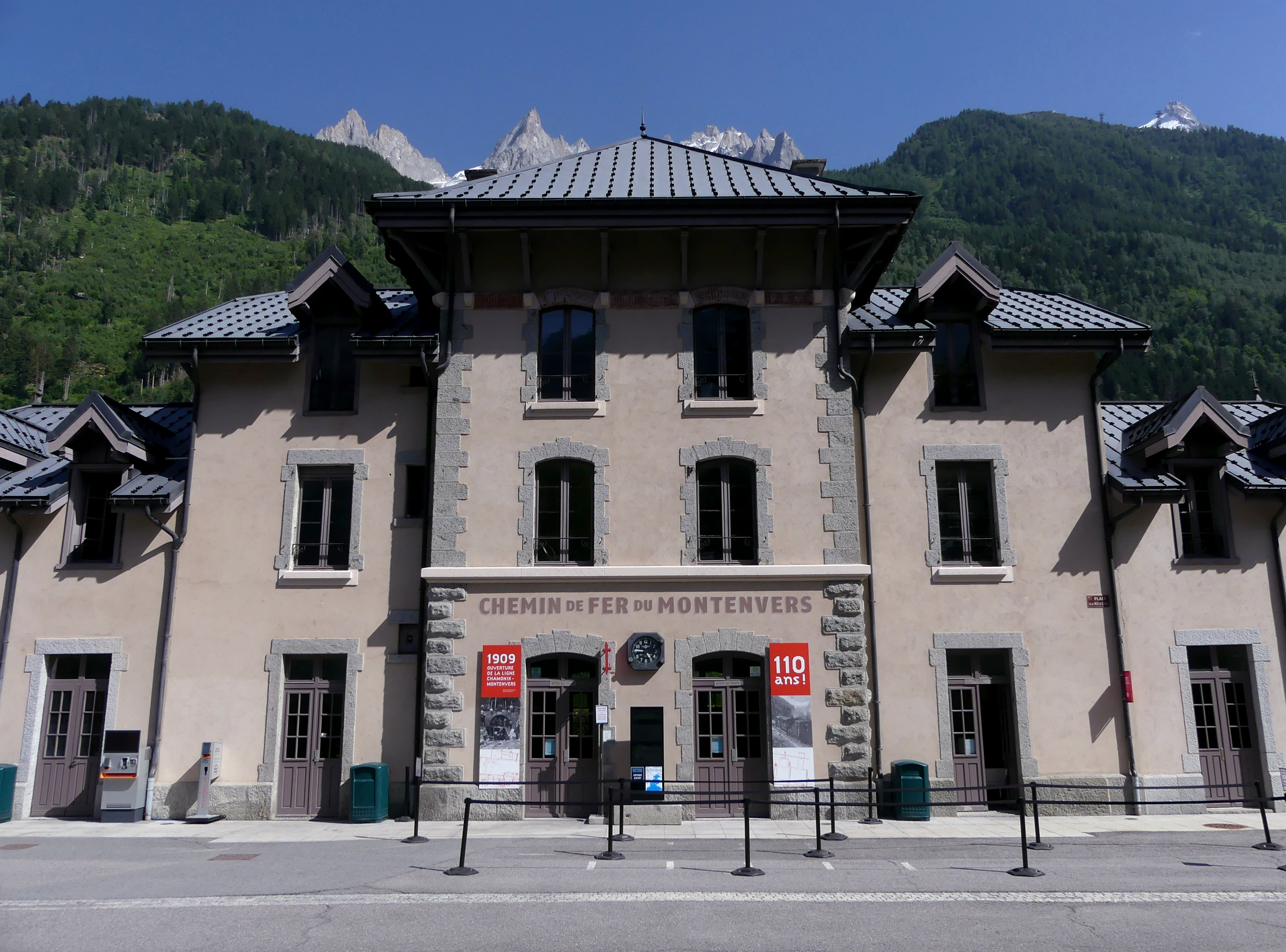
Chamonix-Montenvers station, western terminus of the Chemin de fer du Montenvers

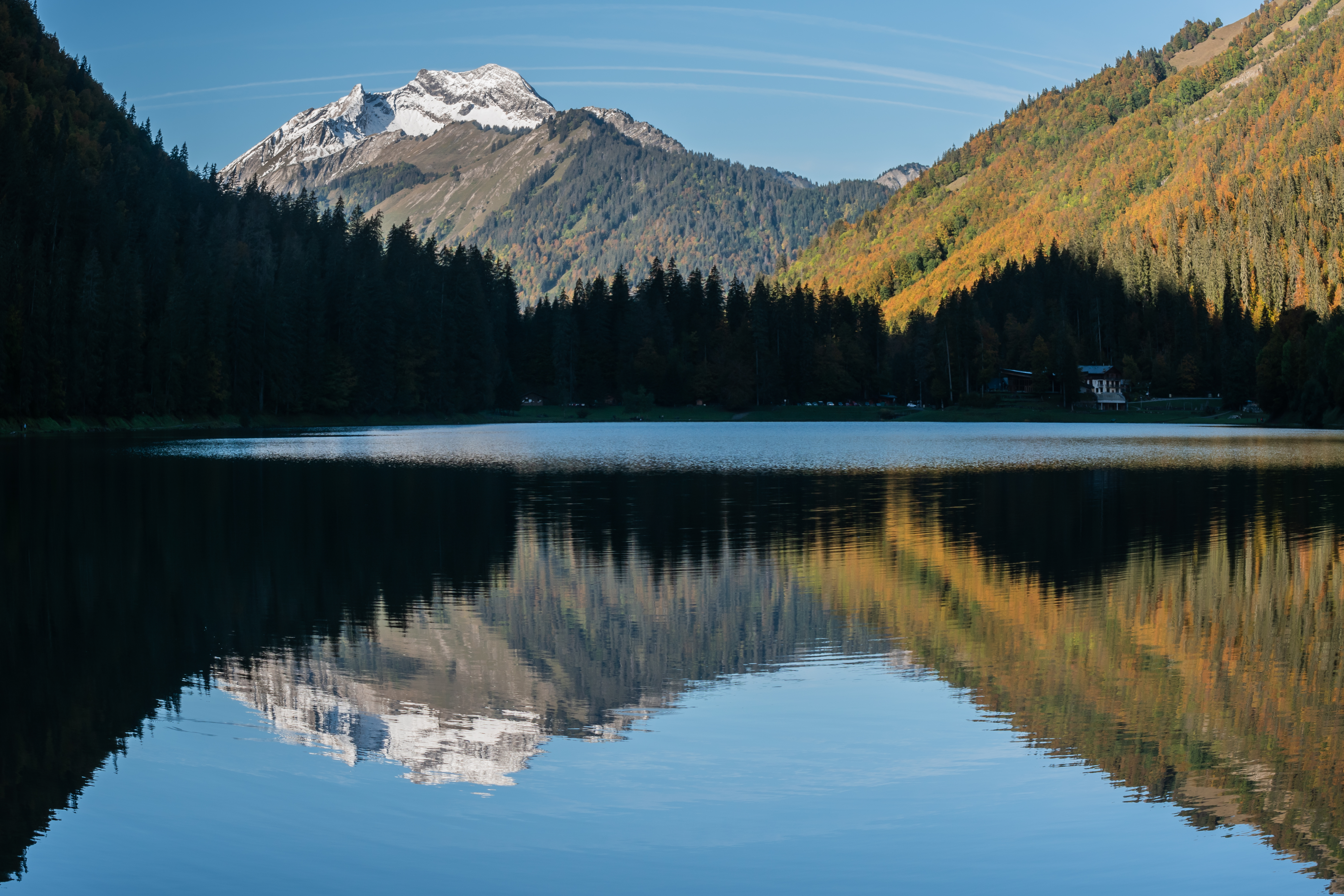
Lake Montriond

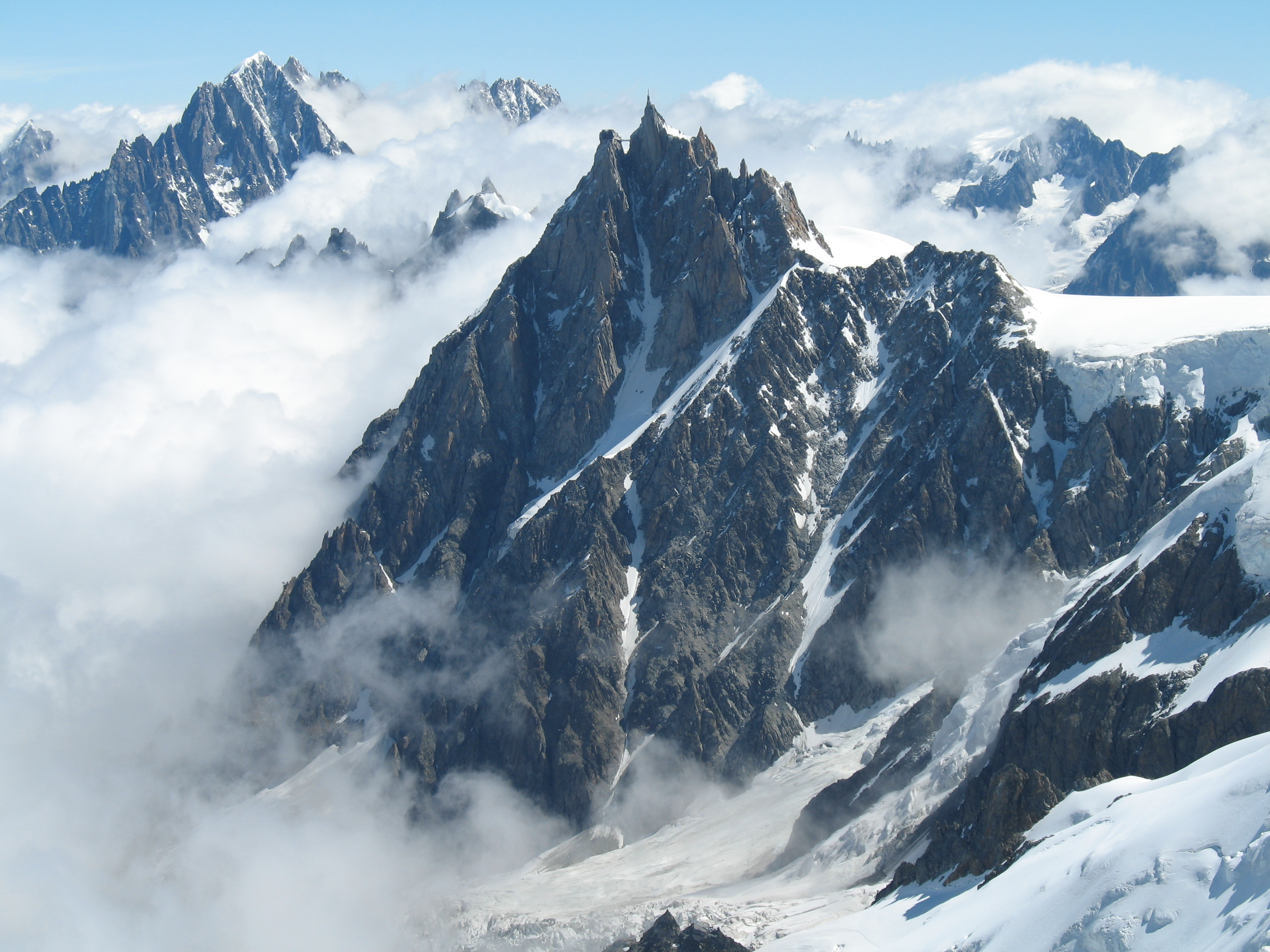
Aiguille du Midi

=== Cross-border workers ===
Many people who live in Haute-Savoie (more than 52,200 in November 2006) work in Switzerland (in the cantons of Geneva, Vaud and Valais). The phenomenon has accelerated since bilateral agreements concluded between Switzerland and the European Union, of which a significant part concerned free movement of people. In 2007, commuting increased over 12%.

Effective June 1, 2007, residents of Haute-Savoie may freely work in Switzerland. The department and municipalities receive compensation ("frontier funds") allocated to municipalities in proportion to the number of border residents there. Following an agreement signed in Geneva in 1973, the Canton of Geneva transferred to Haute-Savoie 3.5 percent of total worker compensation, equivalent in December 2006 to €77.687 million.

=== Export ===
Exports are an important part of the economy; forty percent of Haute-Savoie employees work for exporting firms. Exports are primarily to Germany, the United States, Switzerland, Italy and the United Kingdom. Imports come mainly from Germany, Italy, the United Kingdom, Switzerland and the United States.

=== Taxation ===
Haute-Savoie has property and income taxes. In 2006, 312,823 households were subject to property taxes and 27,747 were exempt. The average income tax per household was €25,621 in 2007 (compared with the national average of €21,930).

=== Transport ===
Haute Savoie is served by the A41 and A43 highways. Annecy is accessible from Lyon, with an estimated travel time between two and three hours in normal traffic. Since it is closer to Geneva, the new highway connects the two cities in about an hour.

The region has only one main airport, Chambéry Airport. However, the airport only provides direct routes to the United Kingdom. Residents in the region normally uses Lyon–Saint-Exupéry Airport and Geneva Airport as both provide more domestic and international destinations.

Saint-Gervais is the only railroad station directly serving a ski resort. The main rail line serves Annecy-Annemasse-Geneva. The Annecy railway station has TGV (high speed trains) departures and arrivals to and from Paris via the high-speed line from Lyon Part-Dieu. Intercity Public transport is run by Lihsa.

=== Sources ===
- Assedic (January 2000)
- Construction 74 (January 2000)
- ERC / DDAF 1999
- Chamber of Agriculture
- Chamber of Trade (December 2000)
- Customs
- SIRENE of INSEE (July 2003)
- CTDEC
- Chamber of Commerce
- Thésame

== See also ==
=== Language ===
- Arpitan language

=== Places ===
- Lake Annecy - The third largest lake in France.
- Lake Geneva - Lake which joins Upper Savoy and Switzerland.
