= Haute-Savoie's 4th constituency =

Constituency of the National Assembly of France

4th constituency of Haute-Savoie
- inline Constituency of the National Assembly of France

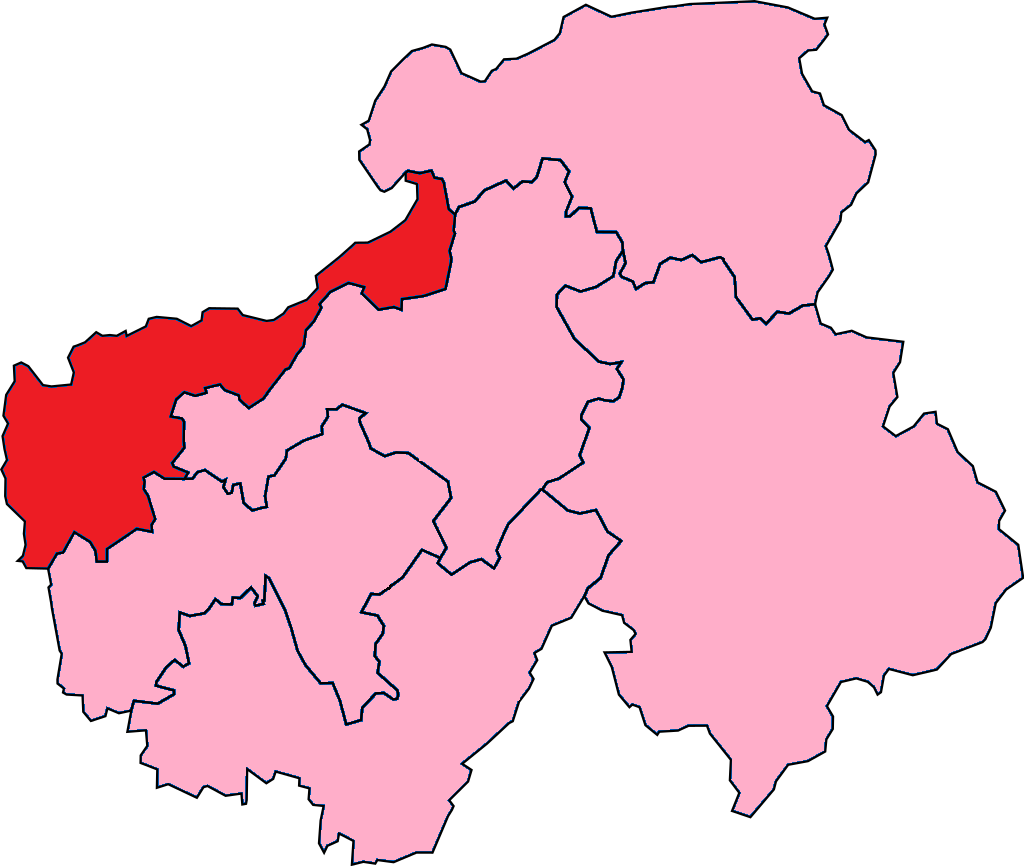
- Haute-Savoie's 4th Constituency shown within Haute-Savoie
- Deputy: Virginie Duby-Muller; LR
- Department: Haute-Savoie
- Cantons: Annemasse Nord, Annemasse Sud, Frangy, Saint-Julien-en-Genevois, Seyssel
- Registered voters: 85236

The 4th constituency of the Haute-Savoie (French: Quatrième circonscription de la Haute-Savoie) is a French legislative constituency in the Haute-Savoie département. Like the other 576 French constituencies, it elects one MP using a two round electoral system.

== Description ==
The 4th constituency of Haute-Savoie covers a swathe of the western border of the department, including the town of Annemasse close to the Swiss border.

The seat has a strong tendency towards the centre right and in 2017 was one of only two constituencies in Haute-Savoie that returned an LR deputy. In 2012 Virginie Duby-Muller succeeded fellow Union for a Popular Movement member Claude Birraux who had served as the area's representative since 1988.

== Assembly Members ==
Election	Member	Party
1988	Claude Birraux	UDF
2002	Claude Birraux	UMP
2012	Virginie Duby-Muller	UMP
2017	Virginie Duby-Muller	LR
2022	Virginie Duby-Muller	LR
2024	Virginie Duby-Muller	LR

== Election results ==
=== 2024 ===
Legislative Election 2024: Haute-Savoie's 4th constituency
Party	Candidate	Votes	%	±%
LO	Cécile Roche	371	0.66	n/a
DIV	Barbara Lemmo Gaud	945	1.69	n/a
PS (NFP)	Dominique Lachenal	15,331	27.37	n/a
RN	Magalie Luho	16,159	28.85	+16.75
DIV	Alexandre Gianesello	2,265	4.04	n/a
DIV	Jean-Marc Lorenzo	83	0.15	n/a
LR	Virginie Duby-Muller	20,865	37.25	+6.01
Turnout		56,019	98.51	+56.59
Registered electors		90,925		
2nd round result
LR	Virginie Duby-Muller	37,452	68.89	+1.77
RN	Magalie Luho	16,911	31.11	n/a
Turnout		54,363	96.86	+56.47
Registered electors		90,902		
LR hold		Swing		

=== 2022 ===
Legislative Election 2022: Haute-Savoie's 4th constituency
Party	Candidate	Votes	%	±%
LR (UDC)	Virginie Duby-Muller	11,501	31.24	-1.38
LFI (NUPÉS)	Valérian Vervoort	7,990	21.71	+8.55
MoDem (Ensemble)	Antoine Vielliard	7,678	20.86	−15.72
RN	Magalie Luho	4,455	12.10	+2.45
REC	Nicolas Bailly	1,488	4.04	N/A
DVE	Shan Bouvier	1,271	3.45	N/A
Others	N/A	2,428	-	−
Turnout		36,811	41.92	+0.23
2nd round result
LR (UDC)	Virginie Duby-Muller	23,171	66.92	+12.29
LFI (NUPÉS)	Valérian Vervoort	11,453	33.08	N/A
Turnout		34,624	40.39	−1.53
LR hold				

=== 2017 ===
Legislative Election 2017: Haute-Savoie's 4th constituency
Party	Candidate	Votes	%	±%
LREM	Laura Devin	12,992	36.58	
LR	Virginie Duby-Muller	11,586	32.62	
FN	Wenceslas Liard	3,428	9.65	
LFI	Michèle Kobus	2,531	7.13	
EELV	Catherine Walthert-Selosse	1,208	3.40	
PS	Anne Favrelle	934	2.63	
Others	N/A	2,838		
Turnout		35,517	41.69	
2nd round result
LR	Virginie Duby-Muller	17,158	54.63	
LREM	Laura Devin	14,249	45.37	
Turnout		31,407	36.85	
LR hold				

=== 2012 ===
Legislative Election 2012: Haute-Savoie's 4th constituency
Party	Candidate	Votes	%	±%
UMP	Virginie Duby-Muller	12,718	31.39	
PS	Guillaume Mathelier	11,598	28.63	
FN	Anne Bardoux	5,710	14.09	
MoDem	Antoine Vielliard	3,568	8.81	
DVD	Claude Deffaugt	2,555	6.31	
EELV	Catherine Walthert Selosse	1,818	4.49	
FG	Daniel Richard	1,481	3.66	
Others	N/A	1,063		
Turnout		40,511	50.61	
2nd round result
UMP	Virginie Duby-Muller	20,816	55.50	
PS	Guillaume Mathelier	16,691	44.50	
Turnout		37,507	46.92	
UMP hold				

=== 2007 ===
Legislative Election 2007: Haute-Savoie's 4th constituency
Party	Candidate	Votes	%	±%
UMP	Claude Birraux	26,017	53.67	
PS	Ali Harabi	7,508	15.49	
MoDem	Antoine Vielliard	6,072	12.53	
FN	Joëlle Regairaz	2,213	4.57	
LV	Martine Feraille	1,710	3.53	
EXG	Maryse Creveau	1,101	2.27	
Others	N/A	3,855		
Turnout		49,174	52.87	
UMP hold				

=== 2002 ===
Legislative Election 2002: Haute-Savoie's 4th constituency
Party	Candidate	Votes	%	±%
UMP	Claude Birraux	16,917	35.28	
PS	Dominique Lachenal	9,840	20.52	
DVD	Raymond Bardet	9,695	20.22	
FN	Joëlle Regairaz	5,800	12.10	
Others	N/A	5,694		
Turnout		48,596	59.89	
2nd round result
UMP	Claude Birraux	24,541	62.81	
PS	Dominique Lachenal	14,532	37.19	
Turnout		40,414	49.81	
UMP gain from UDF				

=== 1997 ===
Legislative Election 1997: Haute-Savoie's 4th constituency
Party	Candidate	Votes	%	±%
FD (UDF)	Claude Birraux	16,654	39.52	
DVG	Guy Gavard	8,203	19.46	
FN	Bernard Midy	6,879	16.32	
PCF	Jean Pelissier	3,262	7.74	
LV	Charles Dumont	2,231	5.29	
GE	Jacques Lesbaches	2,059	4.89	
LDI	Emmanuel Rigal	1,621	3.85	
MRC	Gabriel Galice	1,236	2.93	
Turnout		45,300	61.06	
2nd round result
FD (UDF)	Claude Birraux	26,217	59.13	
DVG	Guy Gavard	18,118	40.87	
Turnout		44,335	64.07	
FD hold				
