= Arrondissements of the Haute-Savoie department =

Administrative divisions of Haute-Savoie, France

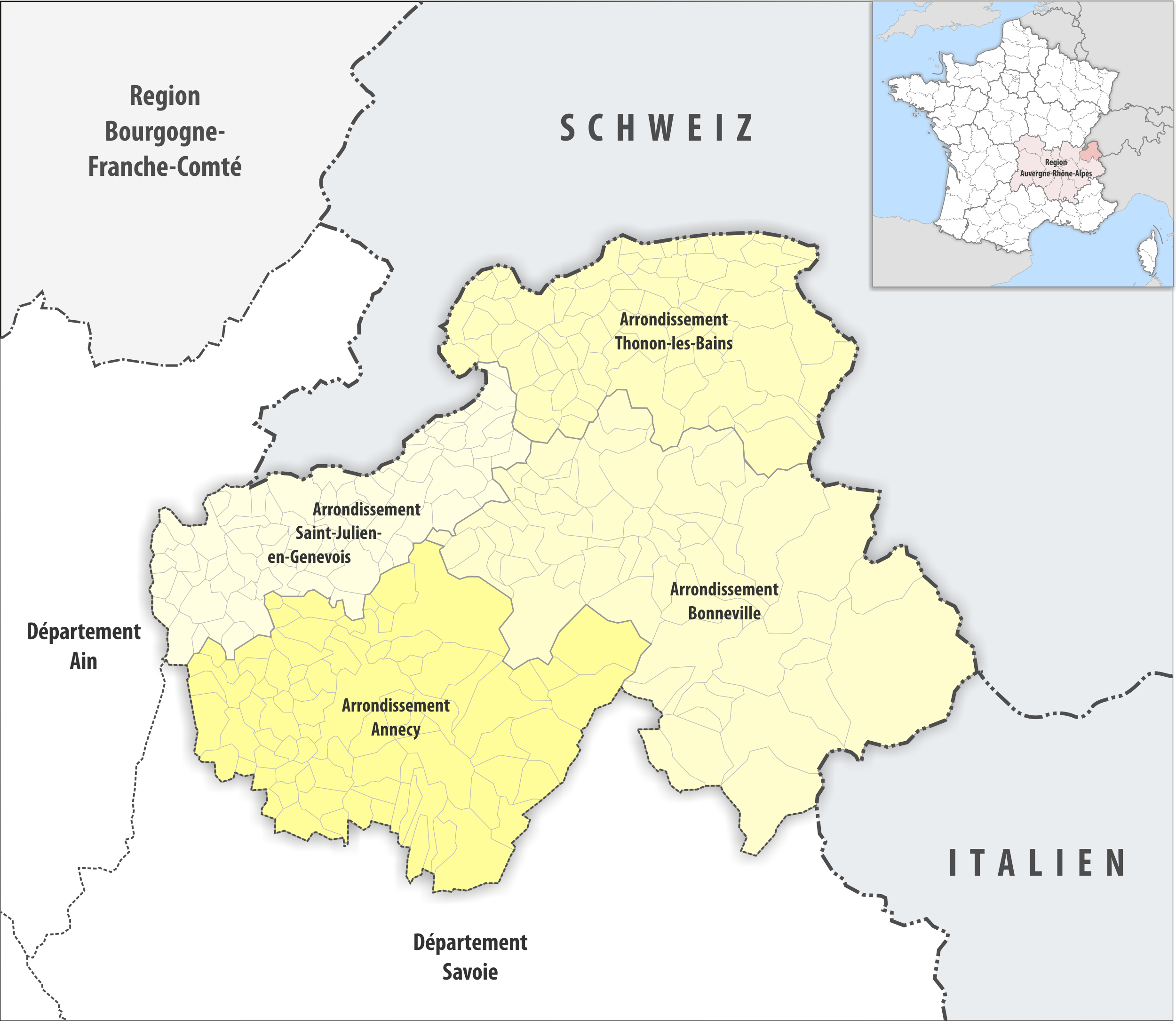
Map of arrondissements of the Haute-Savoie department.

The four arrondissements of the Haute-Savoie department are:

- Arrondissement of Annecy, (prefecture of the Haute-Savoie department: Annecy) with 77 communes. The population of the arrondissement was 293,040 in 2021.
- Arrondissement of Bonneville, (subprefecture: Bonneville) with 59 communes. The population of the arrondissement was 194,428 in 2021.
- Arrondissement of Saint-Julien-en-Genevois, (subprefecture: Saint-Julien-en-Genevois) with 73 communes. The population of the arrondissement was 196,943 in 2021.
- Arrondissement of Thonon-les-Bains, (subprefecture: Thonon-les-Bains) with 70 communes. The population of the arrondissement was 157,071 in 2021.

== History ==
In 1860 the arrondissements of Annecy, Bonneville, Saint-Julien and Thonon were established. The arrondissement of Saint-Julien was disbanded in 1926, and restored in 1933.

The borders of the arrondissements of Haute-Savoie were modified in June 2023:

- two communes from the arrondissement of Annecy to the arrondissement of Saint-Julien-en-Genevois
- one commune from the arrondissement of Saint-Julien-en-Genevois to the arrondissement of Bonneville
- two communes from the arrondissement of Bonneville to the arrondissement of Thonon-les-Bains
