= Lac de Montriond =

Lake in France

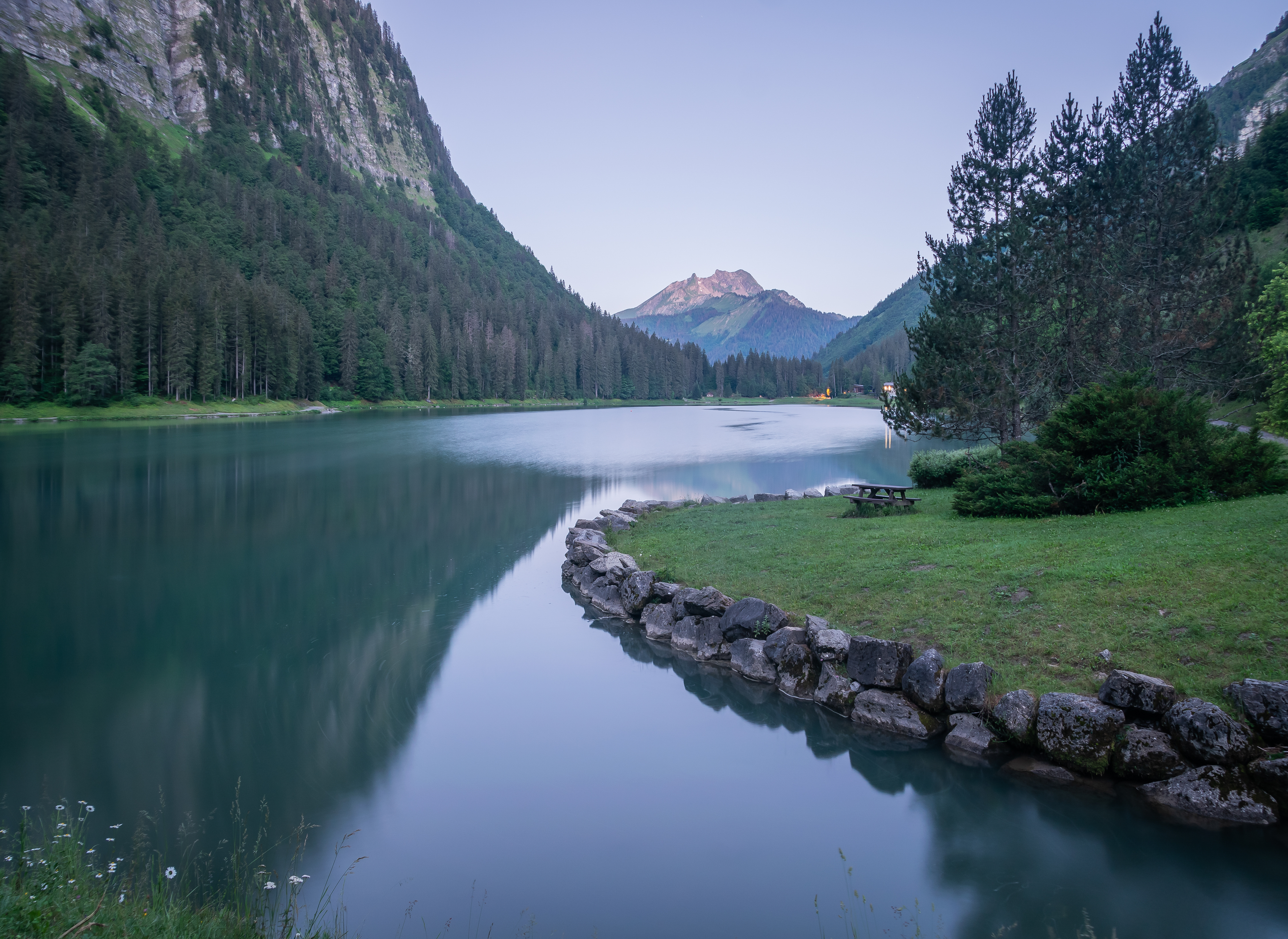
- A view of the Lac de Montriond

- Location within France
- Location: Haute-Savoie
- Coordinates: 46°12′30″N 6°43′40″E
- Basin countries: France
- Surface area: 32 ha (79 acres)
- Max. depth: 19 m (62 ft)
- Water volume: 2.7×10^{6} m^{3} (2,200 acre⋅ft)
- Surface elevation: 1,072 m (3,517 ft)
- Frozen: Winter

The Lac de Montriond (Lake of Montriond) is a lake in the Chablais Alps at Montriond in the Haute-Savoie department of France. It has a surface area of 32 hectares (79 acres).

There is a circular path around the lake and several restaurants next to the D228 access road (which connects Montriond to Les Lindarets). In winter the lake surface frequently freezes over and the immediate area surrounding the lake experiences extremes of cold due to the topology of the surrounding area blocking most sunlight during the coldest months of winter.

The Lac de Montriond has a minimum altitude of 1062m and maximum altitude of 1189m.

== Gallery ==
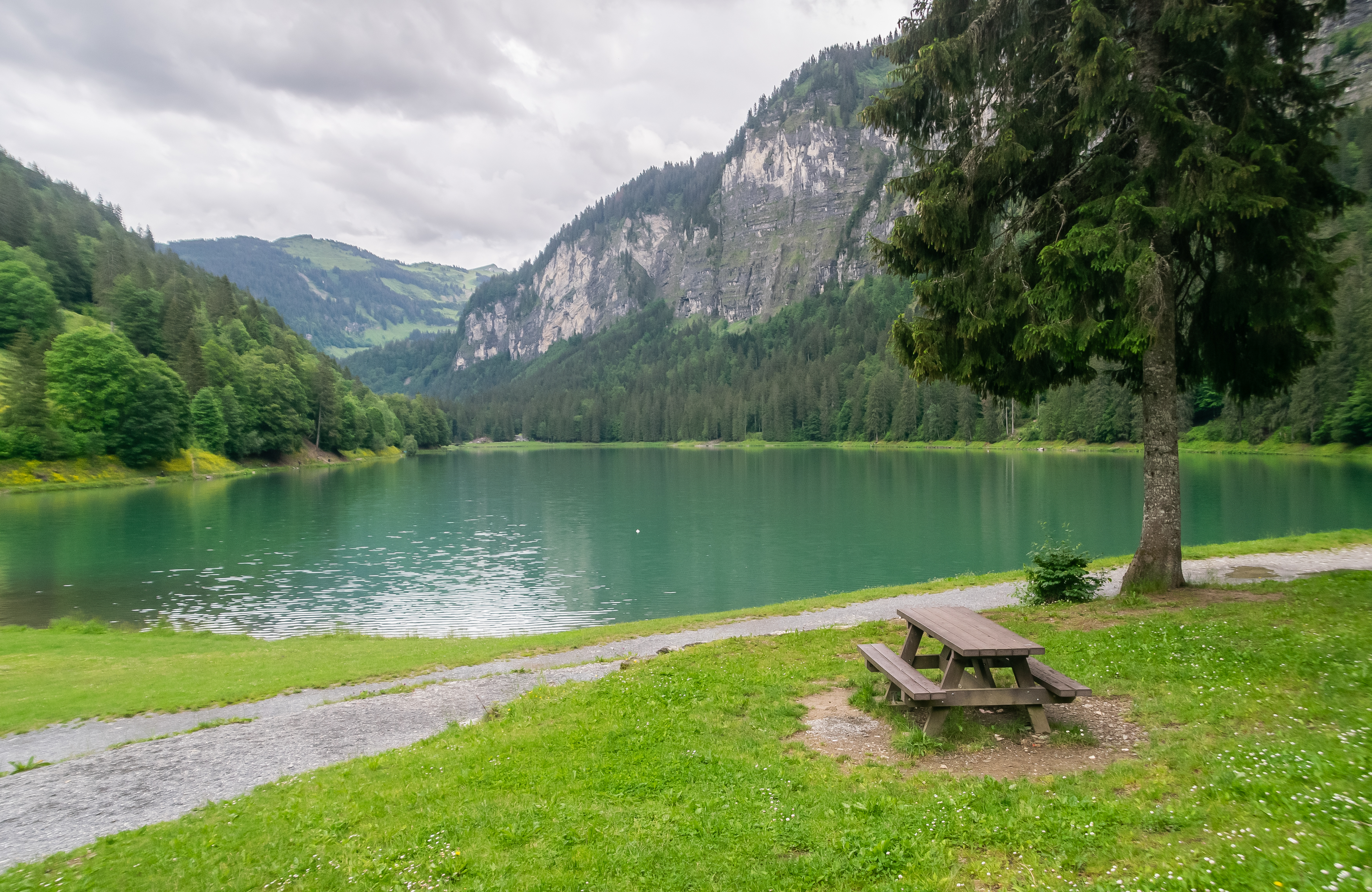
The Lac de Montriond in June 2020

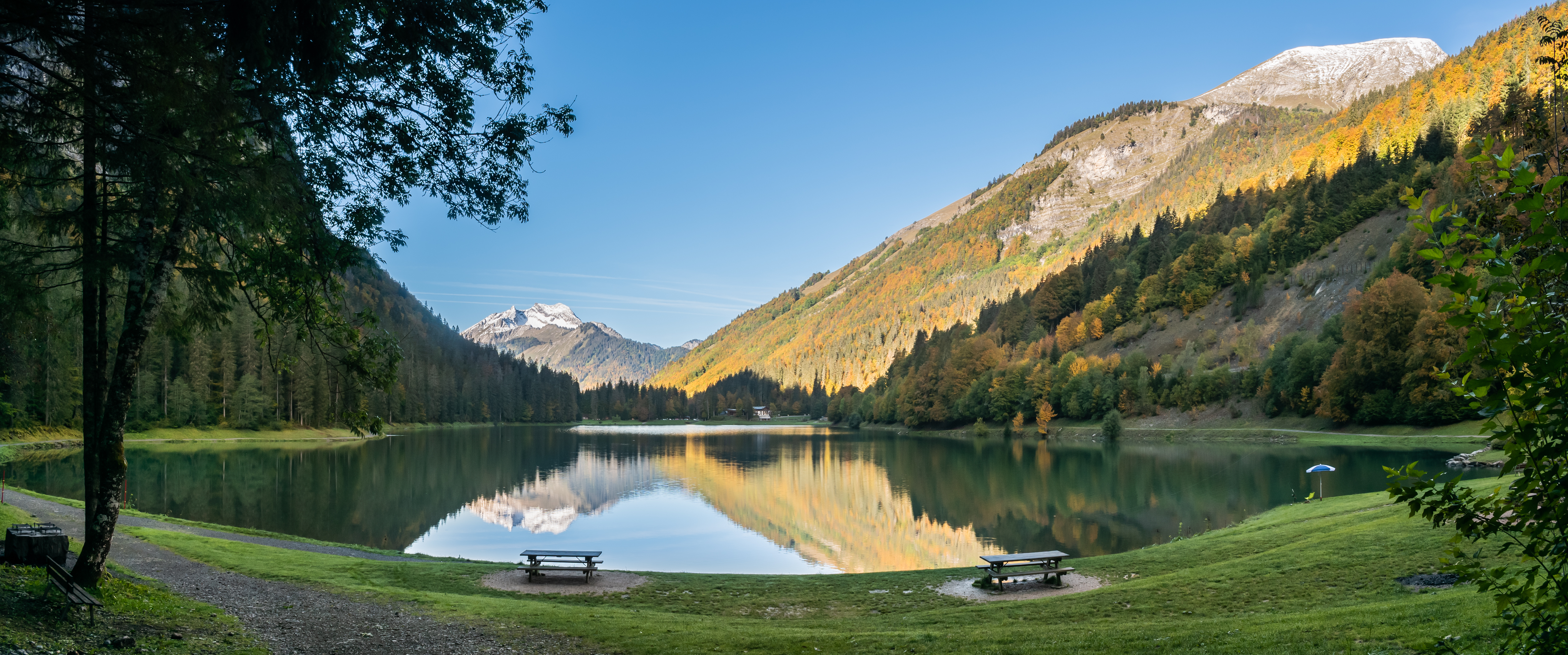
The Lac de Montriond in October 2020
