= Virginie Duby-Muller =

French politician (born 1979)

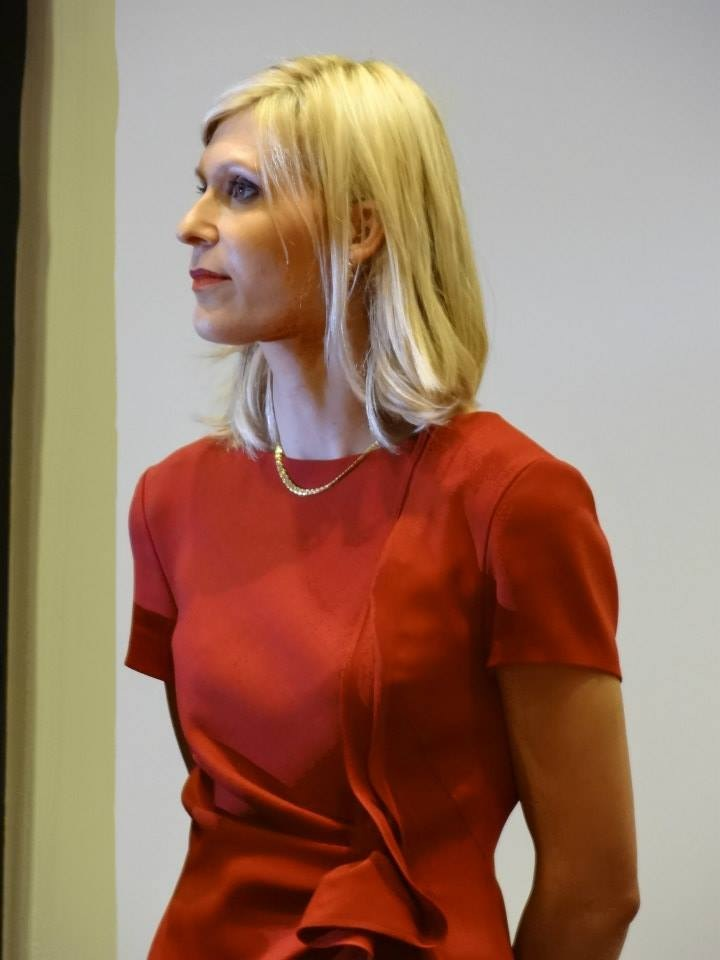
- Virginie Duby-Muller in 2013

Member of the National Assembly for Haute-Savoie's 4th constituency
- In office 20 June 2012 – 9 June 2024
- Preceded by: Claude Birraux

Personal details
- Born: 16 August 1979 (age 47) Bonneville, Haute-Savoie, France
- Party: The Republicans
- Education: Grenoble Institute of Political Studies

Virginie Duby-Muller (born 16 August 1979) is a French politician of The Republicans (LR) who has been a member of the National Assembly since the 2012 elections, representing Haute-Savoie's 4th constituency. Within her party, she has been serving as deputy chairwoman since 2019, under the leadership of chairman Christian Jacob.

== Political career ==
In 1997, at the age of 18, Duby-Muller joined the Rassemblement pour la République (RPR), which would later become the UMP.

Since joining the National Assembly in the 2012 elections, Duby-Muller has been serving on the Committee on Cultural Affairs and Education. In addition to her committee assignments, she is a member of the French-Ethiopian Parliamentary Friendship Group. From 2013 until 2017, she was also part of the French delegation to the Inter-Parliamentary Union (IPU).

In the Republicans’ 2016 presidential primaries, Duby-Muller endorsed Nicolas Sarkozy as the party's candidate for the office of President of France. When the primaries' winner François Fillon became embroiled in a political affair during his campaign, she was one of the LR members who publicly called on him to step down.

Since the 2017 elections, Duby-Muller has been serving as one of the eleven deputy chairpersons of the Republicans' parliamentary group, under the leadership of chairman Christian Jacob.

In the Republicans’ 2017 leadership election, Duby-Muller endorsed Laurent Wauquiez as chairman and later became his campaign's spokesperson. She later endorsed Christian Jacob to succeed Wauquiez as the party’s chairman in the run-up to the Republicans’ 2019 convention.

She was re-elected in the 2022 election.

== Political positions ==
In July 2019, Duby-Muller voted against the French ratification of the European Union’s Comprehensive Economic and Trade Agreement (CETA) with Canada.

== See also ==
- 2012 French legislative election
- 2017 French legislative election
- 2022 French legislative election
