= Cantons of the Haute-Savoie department =

The following is a list of the 17 cantons of the Haute-Savoie department, in France, following the French canton reorganisation which came into effect in March 2015:

- Annecy-1
- Annecy-2
- Annecy-3
- Annecy-4
- Annemasse
- Bonneville
- Cluses
- Évian-les-Bains
- Faverges
- Gaillard
- Le Mont-Blanc
- La Roche-sur-Foron
- Rumilly
- Saint-Julien-en-Genevois
- Sallanches
- Sciez
- Thonon-les-Bains
