= Claude Birraux =

French politician

Claude Birraux (born 18 January 1946 in Ambilly, Haute-Savoie) is a member of the National Assembly of France. He represents the Haute-Savoie department, and is a member of the Union for a Popular Movement.
