= History of Savoy in the Middle Ages =

Historical period in Savoy

The medieval period in Savoy extends from the concession of Sapaudia (or Sapaudie) to the Germanic people of the Burgundians in the 5th century, through the Carolingian-era Saboia, to the emergence of a County of Savoy in the 11th century, which became a duchy in 1416, considered the apex of the Savoyard territory. This period is marked by the integration in 1032 of the Sapaudia territories into the Holy Roman Empire, and by the assertion of feudal power over these lands, with the rise of major noble houses.

The regional political game binds and unbinds, up to eventual absorption, the major lords of Savoy and Geneva and their vassals, as well as representatives of spiritual authority—the bishops of Belley, the bishops and archbishops of Tarentaise, the bishops of Geneva, and those of Saint-Jean-de-Maurienne.

== Feudalism in Savoy (9th–12th centuries) ==
=== From the Burgundian kingdom to feudal assertion ===
Around 443, the Roman general Aetius granted Sapaudia to a Germanic people, the Burgundians, according to a brief 5th-century account: “Sapaudia is given to the remnants of the Burgundian people to be shared with the natives.” (Note: The presence of the Burgundians is attested by numerous necropolises, particularly in the country of Faverges, at Viuz.) They had crossed the Rhine around 407 and originated from the Main region. At that time, the territory of present-day Savoy corresponded to the city of Geneva, part of the Pays de Gex, the north of Savoy (Genevois, Faucigny), and the western half of the Swiss Plateau. The Burgundians formed a first kingdom, Burgundy, from 435 to 534, establishing their capital in Geneva, a religious center since the 4th century, which they burned and rebuilt. In 502, the Burgundian king Gundobad wrote a legal code known as the Lex Gundobada (a collection of Germanic laws influenced by Roman law).

In 534, during the construction of their kingdom, the Franks, through Childebert and Chlothar, sons of Clovis, annexed Burgundy, (Note: King Godomar III was killed in 534. This event marks the end of the first of the Burgundian Kingdoms.) before later conquering Provence. However, the Merovingians left the management of the territory to the first counts, whether Burgundian or Gallo-Roman. Burgundy even regained a kind of autonomy during the reign of Guntram (561–593). His death, however, led to anarchy and territorial fragmentation.

First partition of the Western Empire by the Treaty of Verdun (843).

Under the Carolingians, Savoy began to take shape. A charter from 806 mentions a region called Sabaudia. It held strategic importance due to the Mont-Cenis pass, (Note: The Mont-Cenis pass is a strategic crossing point where the Via Francigena (the pilgrimage route between Canterbury and Rome) passes, serving as a gateway to Italy.) used by pilgrims, merchants, and the military. Charlemagne used it, as did Pepin the Short before him, to subdue the Lombards. The powerful bishopric of Moûtiers, (Note: The Roman city of Darantasia became a bishopric in the 5th century, initially a suffragan of Arles, then of Vienne. In the 8th century, the bishop of Moûtiers was elevated to the rank of metropolitan, with authority over Aosta, Valais (including the Abbey of Saint-Maurice), and Susa.) corresponding to the former Roman province of the Pennine Alps, became an archbishopric. Charlemagne also divided Savoy into counties, whose names and boundaries correspond to the traditional provinces of the Genevois, Savoie Propre, Maurienne, Tarentaise, Chablais, Faucigny, Albanais, and Bugey. (Note: The pagus Genevensis corresponded to the pagus minor Genevensis (Diocese of Geneva, Pays de Gex, Genevois), the pagus minor Albanensis (Pays de l'Albanais), the pagus minor Allingiensis (Savoyard Chablais), the pagus minor Falciniacus (upper valleys of the Arve), the pagus Savogensis (Savoy Proper), the comitatus caput Lacensi (Chablais), the pagus Bellicensis Bugey, the Tarentaise, and the pagus Maurianensis (Maurienne).) During inheritance preparations in 811, Louis the German received this Sabaudia, known as Saboia, along with Maurienne, Tarentaise, Mont-Cenis, and the Susa Valley.

Following the division of the Empire (Treaty of Verdun, 843), Savoy was assigned to the kingdom of Lothair. Amidst difficult succession disputes, (Note: While Savoy was part of the Kingdom of Charles of Provence, with possession of Maurienne, it also gained the bishoprics of Tarentaise and Belley in 858. King Lothaire II granted to his wife Thietberge in 867 about twenty estates in the pagus Genevensis (Genevois), including Annecy, Seynod, Pringy, Balmont, etc., lands outside his realm. He even donated property in Maurienne to the church of Saint-Pierre in Lyon.) the counties of Savoy were split between Boson of Provence and Rudolph II of Burgundy. A degree of unity returned during the reign of Rudolph III of Burgundy around 993, marking the rise of the Second Kingdom of Burgundy.

During this period, Savoy endured Saracen invasions. Novalaise and Geneva were pillaged and burned. “If the Saracen invasions hold a real place in the annals of Western Europe, the romantic role they play in the annals of this region is even broader,” wrote the historian Henri Ménabréa. In Maurienne, a few legends circulate, especially concerning the etymology of the province's name. The Burgundian kingdom survived these incursions.

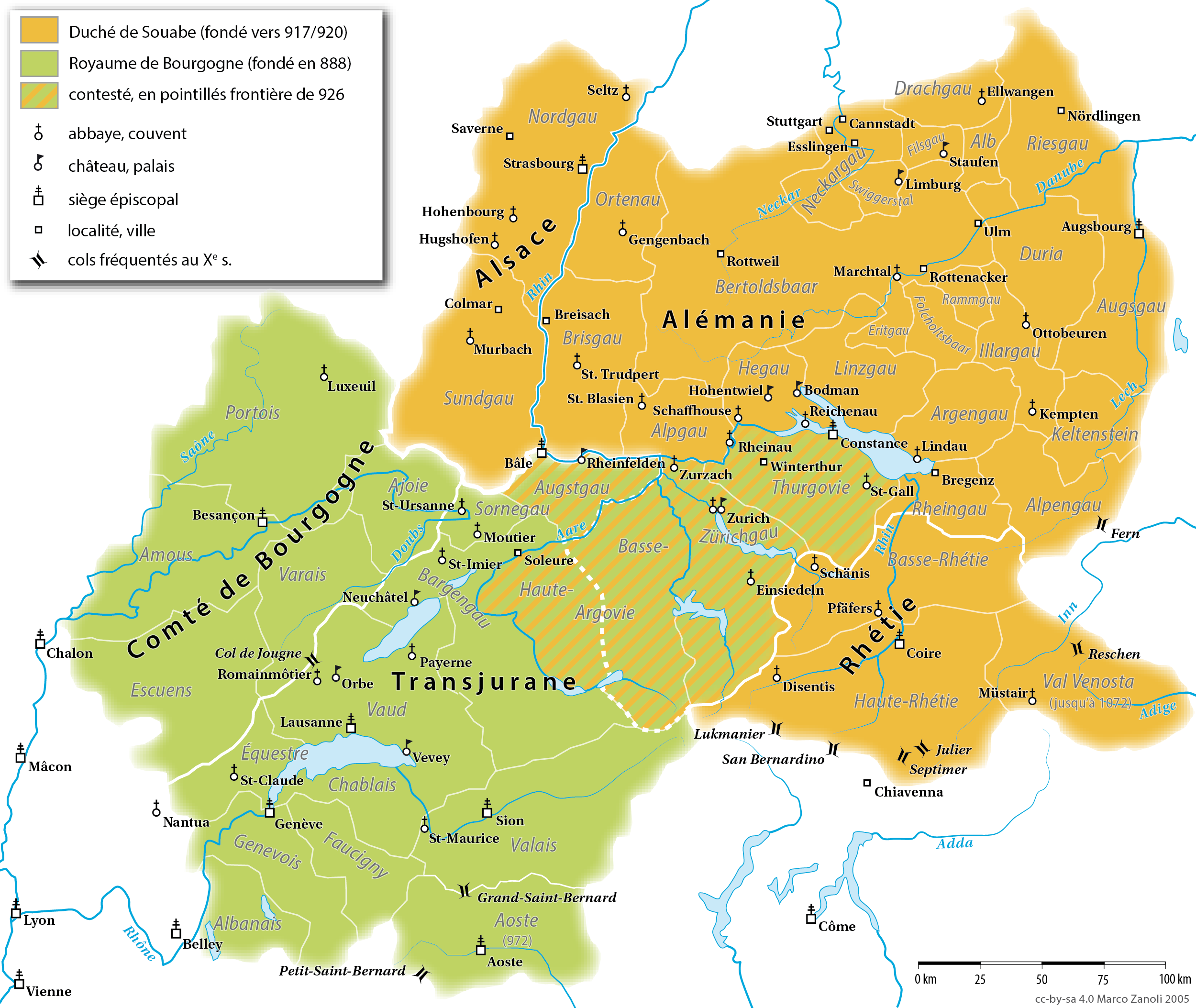
Map of the kingdom of Upper Burgundy (in green) around the year 1000.

The last king, Rudolph III of Burgundy, brought his kingdom closer to the Holy Roman Empire. He chose a descendant of Otto as his successor, Conrad II, to whom he sent the Lance of Saint Maurice, a mystical symbol of Burgundian royalty. In 1032, Savoy became imperial territory. This territory ensured control of the Western Alps and the Mont-Cenis pass for the Empire. However, the end of the reign of the last king of Burgundy marked the rise of feudalism in the lands of Savoy—a confusion between property and sovereignty (as noted by François Guizot)—and powerful families took advantage of the rivalries between the Empire and the Counts of Champagne.

=== The lords ===
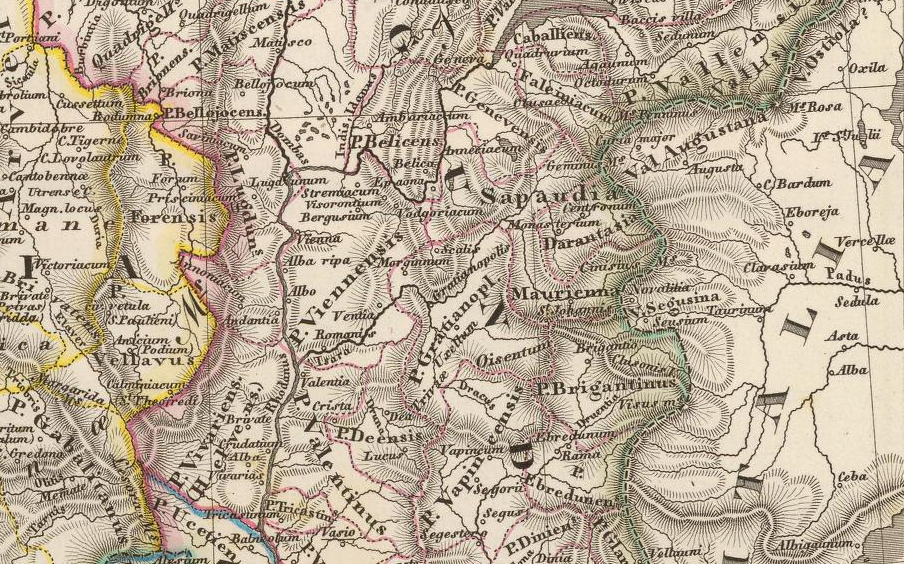
The Pagi in the Carolingian era. This map shows the Savoyard pagi: the pagus Savogensis (Sapaudie or Savoie propre), the pagus Bellicensis (Bugey), the pagus Genevensis (Genevois), the pagus Tarentasia (Tarentaise) and the pagus Maurianensis (Maurienne).

According to Léon Ménabréa (1839), there were about thirty feudal lords in the 11th century in the province of Sapaudia: “At the top of the list: the bishops and later archbishops of Tarentaise, the bishops of Geneva, the bishops of Maurienne, the counts of Maurienne (the future House of Savoy), the counts of Geneva (who controlled the city of Geneva and the pagus Genevensis), the barons of Faucigny; in the second tier: the viscounts of La Chambre, of Briançons, of Chambéry, the lords of Viry, Chevron, Miolans, Montmayeur, Menthon, La Rochette, Compey, Sales, Sallenove, Beaufort, Lucinges, Allinges, etc.” The bishops of Belley must also be added to this list.

With the integration into the Empire, the lords in Savoy's territories claimed a certain political autonomy. Savoy had around 250 noble families. (Note: The Armorial and Nobility of Savoy presents some of the main noble families of Savoy.)

However, “little by little, the small feudal lords fade away; a star rises and blazes at the center of the feudal firmament—it is the star of the House of Savoy.”

=== Between the counts of Geneva and the Humbertians ===
Two families came to dominate the region: the Counts of Geneva in the north, around the city of Geneva, and the Humbertians, counts in Maurienne and future Counts of Savoy, (Note: The title of Count of Savoy was adopted starting in 1143 by Amadeus III of Savoy, and Thomas I's successors replaced the title of Maurienne with that of Savoy.) starting from the Maurienne.

Coat of arms of the county of Geneva: Five golden points equal to four azure.

The Genevas. The origin of the comes gebennensis (Count of Geneva, not to be confused with Count of Genevois, as is sometimes mistakenly translated) is uncertain but attested from the 11th century onward. However, it is known that they held lands between Lake Geneva and Lake Bourget, as well as in the Pays de Vaud, Gex, and the town of Michaille, the Genevois, and the city of Annecy. They also controlled the Chamonix Valley, which they gave to the Abbey of Saint-Michel-de-la-Cluse around 1090. Only the Chablais escaped their control. Although they controlled the city of Geneva, they conflicted with the bishops of Geneva and, starting in the 12th and 13th centuries, they were opposed to the Counts of Savoy.

The Humbertians. The origin of the Humbertians—Counts of Maurienne—is controversial. Twentieth-century historians confirm the hypothesis of Georges de Manteyer, who attributes a Burgundian origin to the House of Savoy and the first of its line—Humbert Whitehands (Note: The nickname Albimanus or Count Biancamaro originates from the 14th century, according to an article by André Palluel-Guillard on the Sabaudia.org website. Another hypothesis, mentioned by Comby, suggests that the whiteness of the hands was, in the Middle Ages, a sign of distinction and nobility, as opposed to the calloused hands of commoners.) (c. 980–c. 1048), Umbertus Comes. Henri Ménabréa thus explains: “These princes, originating from Champagne and Burgundy, succeeded, through skillful politics, in seizing the ecclesiastical fiefs of the region by exploiting the fragmentation of sovereignty and by contracting advantageous marriages.” According to the legend preserved in the Grandes chroniques de Savoie by Jean Servion, commissioned by Philip of Bresse, the family supposedly had an imperial and German origin: Berold is said to have descended from the son of King Ezeus of Cologne, who had married Ysobie, daughter of the emperor of Constantinople. However, the cathedral of Aosta mentions donations from Humbert, Count of Maurienne, son of the illustrious Bérold of Saxony.

In any case, Humbert held high-ranking positions—serving as advisor—to the last king of Burgundy, Rudolf, and especially to Queen Hermengarde or Ermengarde. As a result, he controlled all or part of the counties of Savoy and Sermorens in 1003, then that of Belley and Nyon in 1018, and finally Aosta in 1024. He dominated the northern part of the County of Viennois before 1025. He took an oath for these various counties at the Council of Anse in 1025. Through his marriage, he acquired rights in Valais and in the Chablais. In 1043, he obtained the County of Maurienne. Tarentaise, the domain of the bishop of Moûtiers, did not escape Humbertian control, nor did the March of Turin. The expansion he initiated quickly encountered limits in the north with the Genevois and in the south with the Dauphins. However, he alone controlled the main Alpine passes that allowed access to Italian lands (the Mont Cenis pass, and the Little and Great St. Bernard passes). This role gave rise to the title "Gatekeepers of the Alps," which future Counts of Savoy would bear, in rivalry with the Counts of Albon in Dauphiné.

=== The rise of the first counts of Savoy ===
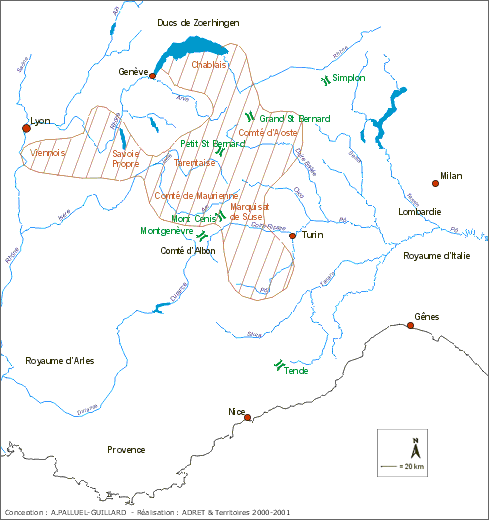
La Savoie aux XII^{e} et XIII^{e} siècles

Over the following centuries, the Savoyard dynasty strove to expand its fiefs through marriages and treaties. Humbert’s son, Amadeus, received the city of Asti from the emperor. His son, Odo or Otto, married Countess Adelaide of Susa in 1045, which enabled control over the March of Turin, specifically the Susa Valley and Piedmont. Upon the count's death, she became regent of the fiefs. Their sons, Peter I (who acquired Bugey and the Margraviate of Ivrea) and Amadeus II did not reign for long. Adelaide, as regent, maintained control over the family’s political affairs. She thus welcomed her son-in-law, Emperor Henry IV—who had married Bertha of Savoy, Adelaide’s daughter—to Chignin (in the Combe de Savoie) in 1077 and received a “fair province of Burgundy,” undoubtedly the Chablais, in exchange for granting passage over the Mont Cenis on his way to Canossa.

Coat of arms of the first Counts of Savoy.

Upon his death in 1091, Humbert II became count but lost the inheritance of Piedmont due to its dismantling by Emperor Henry IV, who sought to curb the rise of powerful feudal families. However, he retained control over the Susa Valley and Pinerolo. He also succeeded in marrying his daughter Adela to Louis VI the Fat, thereby positioning Savoy in a diplomatic balancing act that his descendants would maintain between the Kingdom of France and the Empire. He asserted his authority over Tarentaise—mainly the upper Isère Valley—and established continuous communication between his possessions along the Rhône and the Aosta Valley.

Upon Humbert’s death in 1103, the future Amadeus III was too young to rule, and his mother, Gisela of Burgundy-Ivrea, governed the states of Savoy as regent. He was married to the daughter of the Count of Geneva, Mathilde or Mahaut of Albon of Viennois, daughter of Guigues III of Albon.

When he came of age, Count Amadeus III preserved the feudal character of institutions in the Alpine lands. However, on the western side of the Alps, he promoted municipal liberties. In 1111, he obtained the title of Count of the Empire, perpetual vicar and viceroy of Arles, and secular abbot of Saint-Maurice d’Agaune, a title he held until 1116. He reclaimed the County of Turin that his father had lost. In 1123, at the urging of a “great assembly of close relatives, friends, barons, and knights of the land,” he married the daughter of the Dauphin, Mahaut of Albon. However, this policy of dynastic marriage complicated the Savoy’s political role. The count had to resist the influence of his mother and Louis VI the Fat and fight the troops of the Dauphin Guigues IV of Albon during the siege of Montmélian in 1142. The Dauphin died during the battle. The following year, Amadeus III exchanged the title of Count of Maurienne for that of comes Sabaudiae. He participated alongside Louis VII of France in the Second Crusade and died in Nicosia in 1149.

Coat of arms of the Counts of Savoy from the 12th century

Beyond military action, his political and symbolic role was crucial for the dynasty. In 1125, he founded the Abbey of Hautecombe, which became the Counts of Savoy’s necropolis from the 12th to the 15th century. Moreover, he changed the dynastic coat of arms, abandoning the black imperial eagle on a gold field—arms of the emperors of the Holy Roman Empire, of whom the counts were vassals—in favor of a red field with a silver cross (de gueules à la croix d'argent).

Following in his father's footsteps, Humbert III had to fight against the Dauphin, Guigues V of Albon, at Montmélian in 1153. He also took part in the Third Crusade. Despite the Guelf policy of the counts, who aligned themselves with Henry II Plantagenet, he supported Pope Alexander III against Emperor Frederick Barbarossa. However, in 1168, he allowed the emperor to pass through Mont-Cenis when he was driven out by the Lombard leagues. The emperor returned over the pass and set fire to Susa in 1174, before going to be crowned King of Burgundy in Arles. The conflict was now out in the open. The disputes between the count and the new emperor, Henry VI, continued and culminated in the count being placed under the imperial ban in 1187, which led to the devastation of Piedmont. The various bishops on the count’s lands now fell under the emperor protection. Upon his death, he was buried at the Abbey of Hautecombe.

== Expansion of the county of Savoy (13th–15th centuries) ==
=== The Ghibelline policy of the new counts ===
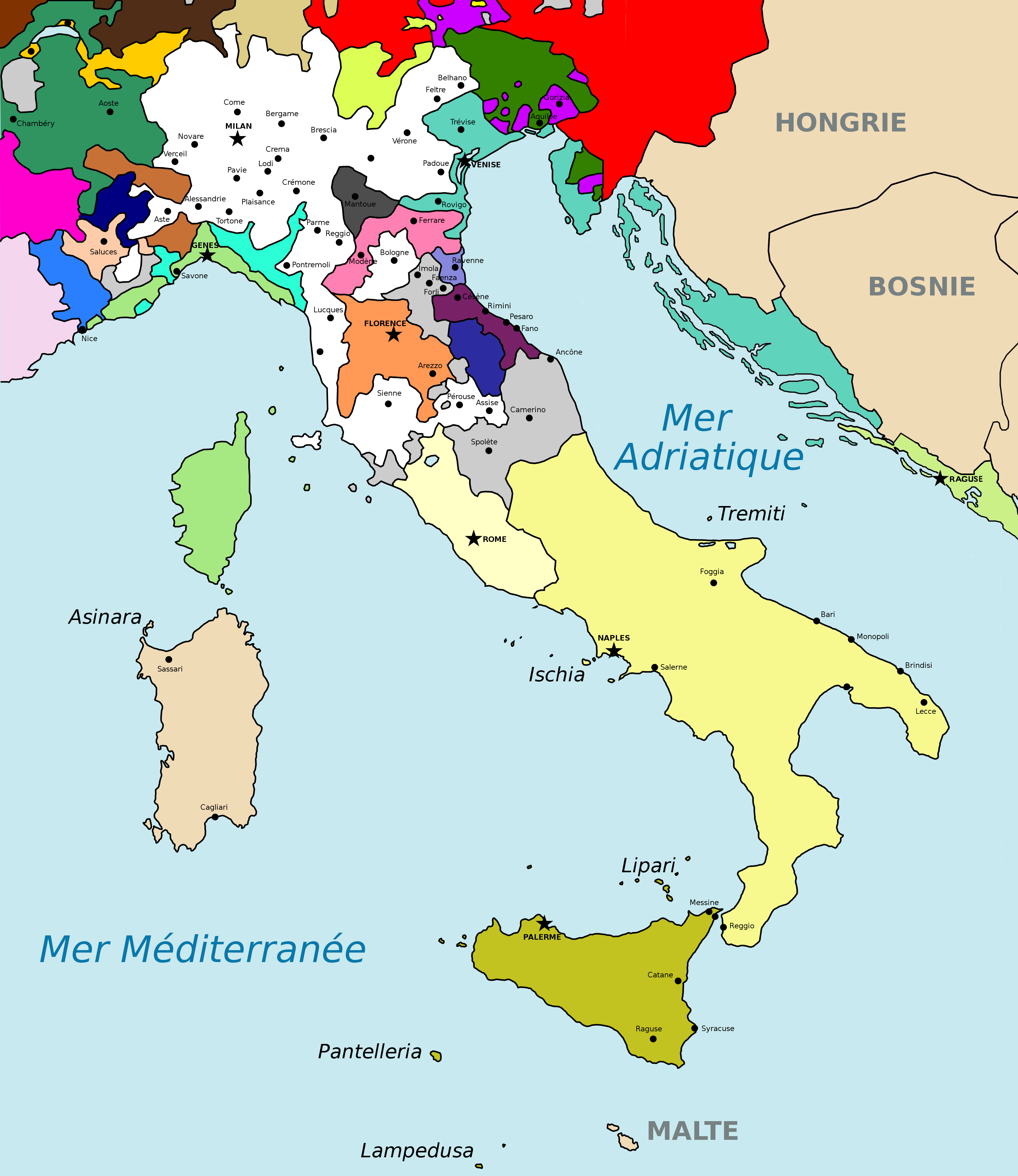
Map of Northern Italy in 1402

Count Humbert III (1136–1189) succeeded his father at the age of thirteen in 1148, with Amadeus of Clermont, known as "of Lausanne" (1110–1159), abbot of Hautecombe and future bishop of Lausanne, serving as his guardian. His long reign was marked by the attempted restoration of imperial authority pursued by Frederick I, who opposed the independence of the princes of Savoy. Nevertheless, Humbert managed to preserve the dynasty through his steadfastness, enabling his descendants to resume their expansionist efforts. He died on March 4, 1189. His faith and religious devotion earned him beatification, which was proclaimed by Pope Gregory XVI in 1838.

His son, Count Thomas I (c. 1177–1233), regained favor with the emperor through his guardian, his father’s cousin Boniface, Marquis of Montferrat. Boniface had supported the emperor against Count Humbert III. The Count of Savoy recovered Piedmont and was appointed imperial vicar in Lombardy by the emperor. However, Turin still eluded him. On March 15, 1232, he purchased the town of Chambéry (Note: "I, Berlion of Chambéry, sell to you, Thomas, Count of Savoy, and your successors forever, all that I have and owe in the town of Chambéry, and for this sale, I have received 32,000 good strong sols of Suse." See also the article "History of Chambéry.") from Viscount Berlion, which became the new capital of the Counts of Savoy with the acquisition of its castle in 1295. The town remained the political capital until its transfer to Turin in 1536.

In 1248, the landslide of Mont Granier, which formed the Abyss of Myans, killed several thousand inhabitants in the Saint-André town.

Amadeus IV of Savoy (his son, 1197–1253) obtained the titles of Count of Aosta and Chablais from the emperor. During his conquests, he expanded his domain without a true overarching plan, gaining territories in the Viennois, Lyonnais, Piedmont, Liguria, and the region of Vaud with the acquisition of the castle of Moudon. He obtained the Marquisate of Ivrea in 1248 but failed to take Turin. Despite the Ghibelline policy of the House of Savoy, he allowed Pope Innocent IV, then in flight, to pass through his lands. His brother, Count Thomas II, even married Beatrice Fieschi, the pope’s niece. However, he failed to seize Turin and died during one of the assaults he led. His son, Peter, nicknamed the “Little Charlemagne,” after having been a canon, married Agnes of Faucigny, heiress of Faucigny, the County of Romont, and the Barony of Vaud. He then spent ten years in England at the court of his nephew, Henry III of England, where his residence, the Hostel of Savoy, became a beacon of London society. After the death of Boniface of Savoy in 1263, Peter acquired the title of Count and began expanding his domain westward, gaining fiefs in the region of Vaud, the Pays de Gex, and Chablais.

This territorial expansion continued under the reign of Amadeus V the Great (1282–1323), who, through his marriage to Sybille of Bâgé, obtained the lordship corresponding to the province of Bresse. His wars in Italian lands were not only victorious but also brought him the lordships of Asti and Ivrea from Emperor Henry VII, and territories in the Genevois (the last enclave within Savoy lands). He died during the siege of Rhodes in 1323. The process of unifying Sabaudia resumed under Amadeus VI, known as the “Green Count” (1343–1383). The Treaty of Paris in 1355 enabled him to obtain Faucigny and lordships in the Pays de Gex, Bugey, and Bresse, in exchange for Savoyard possessions in the Dauphiné and Viennois.

In the early 15th century, following the submission of the Barcelonnette Valley and the dedication of Nice to Savoy in 1388, Amadeus VIII (1391–1439), future Pope Felix V (1439–1449), acquired the last enclave in Savoyard territory, the Genevois, bought from Odon de Villars. He also purchased the land of Bourbon and inherited from Louis of Poitiers the counties of Diois and Valentinois. (Note: Jules-Joseph Vernier notes: "The counties of Diois and Valentinois passed in 1455 to Dauphin Louis, who in return ceded to the Duke of Savoy the direct lordship and homage of Faucigny. This province, at the death of Count Peter II (1268), had remained with Agnes, his wife, who left it to her only daughter, Béatrix, wife of Gui VII, Dauphin of Viennois.") The size of the Savoyard lands enabled the count to obtain, in 1416, the title of Duke, granted by Emperor Sigismund.

=== Territorial expansion of the county of Savoy ===
Since the 11th century, the House of Savoy has held the following counties, beginning with Humbert I: Viennois, Savoy, and Sermorens (1003), Nyon or the County of the Equites (1018), the Aosta Valley (1024, 1038), former Chablais (1033, 1128), Tarentaise (1038), Maurienne (1043), Susa Valley (1045), and Bugey (1077). It also acquired the lordship of Piedmont (excluding Turin, 1191, 1235), the rest of Lower Valais south of Martigny (1224), the region of Vaud (excluding Lausanne, 1244), the Marquisate of Ivrea (1248), Bresse (1272), and Revermont (1289).

After 1355, through the Treaty of Paris, the territory of the Savoyard principality expanded to include the Barony of Gex, La Valbonne (including the castle of the seigneury of Montluel), Faucigny, and Beaufortain. In 1388, the dedication of Nice enabled the unification of the County of Nice and the Viguerie of Barcelonnette. The County of Geneva was purchased in 1401, and the Dombes in 1402.

In the 15th century, the States of Savoy, elevated to a duchy in 1416, consisted of around twenty bailiwicks: (Note: The organization is partially described in the work. The county of Nyon disappeared and passed to the House of Geneva.)

- Bailiva Sabaudiæ, divided into three territories, each with its viscount: Savoie Propre, whose administrative center was Montmélian, then Chambéry; pagus Maurianensis (County of Maurienne); pagus Tarentasia (Tarentaise), which included seventeen castellanies. Due to the importance of this bailiwick, it was divided into a district of Savoy and another of Tarentaise-Maurienne.
- Bailiva Novalesii, the Novalaise with Voiron, was divided into eight castellanies (Saint-Genix, Yennes, Chanaz, Pierre-Châtel, Dolomieu, Île-de-Guiers, Pont-de-Beauvoisin, Voiron).
- Bailiva Viennensis, the Viennois of Savoy, until 1355, with Saint-Georges-d’Espéranche and its nine castellanies.
- Bailiva Burgi, Bresse and the Dombes, with Bourg and its twenty-one castellanies, and Trévoux with its twelve.
- Bailiva Beugessii, Bugey-Valromey with Château de Rossillon/Saint-Germain, including seven castellanies.
- Bailiva Chablasii, Chablais with Château de Chillon and its thirteen castellanies.
- Bailiva Vallis Auguste, the Aosta Valley with Châtel-Argent/Villeneuve and its five castellanies.
- Bailiva Valdensis, the region of Vaud with Moudon and its twelve castellanies.
- Bailiva Vallis Secusie, the Susa Valley with Avigliana, comprising only three castellanies.
- Bailiva Montis Loelli, La Valbonne, with Montluel and four castellanies.
- Bailiva Fulciniacum, Faucigny with Châtillon and its seventeen castellanies (including Beaufortain).
- Balliva Genevensis, Genevois with Annecy and its twenty-four castellanies.

To these must be added the bailiwicks of Gex; the "New Lands of Provence" (Nice and Barcelonnette); Martigny; and parts of Italy (Piedmont, Ivrea, and Vercelli, acquired in 1427).

=== Urban development ===
The economic boom of the 12th and 13th centuries, continuing into the next century, fueled urban growth throughout Western Europe. The Savoy region was also affected by this urban phenomenon. During this period, three cities of ancient origin held particular importance in the region: Geneva, Annecy, and Chambéry. Geneva gradually lost its regional prominence once the Counts of Geneva were expelled and began living with their itinerant court in various castles, before eventually settling permanently in Annecy—in a fortified manor house, and later a castle from the 13th century onward. During this same period, the Counts of Savoy settled in Chambéry, when on March 15, 1232, Count Thomas I bought part of the rights over the town from the Viscount of Chambéry, Berlion. His successor, Amadeus V, purchased the castle in 1295 and turned it into a comital residence.

The urban network in Savoy consists of about twenty small towns. Geneva and Chambéry reached populations of 3,000 to 4,000 inhabitants, while Annecy had fewer than 2,000 inhabitants by the end of the 14th century. Even though the observed network may seem modest, the role of these towns in the surrounding countryside remained relatively significant.

==== New towns ====
The period is characterized by the emergence of new towns in Western Europe during the 12th and 13th centuries. This phenomenon occurred later in Savoy, with the first town foundations appearing only in the 13th and 14th centuries. The first of these was the "Ville Neuve de Chillon" in 1214, now known as Villeneuve in Switzerland. These towns developed particularly in strategic locations, near important castles such as Chillon, on major routes like Flumet (founded in 1228 by the Lords of Faucigny), along the road connecting Faucigny to the County of Savoy, or near "an old village or a religious establishment." The creation of L'Hôpital-sous-Conflans in 1285 by Count Amadeus V of Savoy was intended to monitor the city of Conflans, located above, and in the hands of the Archbishop of Tarentaise.

Historian Ruth Mariotte-Löber counts twelve new towns established in the territories of the Counts of Savoy: Yverdon (c. 1260), Saint-Georges-d'Espéranche (c. 1257), Villeneuve de Châtel-Argent (1273), La Côte-Saint-André (1281), L'Hôpital-sous-Conflans (1287, founded by Count Amadeus V), Châtel-Saint-Denis (1296), Pont-d'Ain (1298), Morges (1292), Yvoire (1306), Vaulruz (1316), Rolle (before 1318), and Ordonnaz (1337).

==== Urban institutions ====
The first town charters granted in France date to the 12th century. In Savoy, the villa libera (free town) began to appear in the 13th century, which is relatively late compared to other parts of Western Europe.

The main franchise charters granted in Savoy include: Yenne (1215), Montmélian (1223 or 1233), Flumet (1223 or 1228), Chambéry (March 4, 1232), Saint-Germain-de-Séez (1259), Évian (1264 or 1265), Saint-Julien-de-Maurienne (1264), Thonon (1268), Seyssel (1283 or 1285), Bonneville (1283 or 1289), L'Hôpital-sous-Conflans (1287), Rumilly (1291 or 1292), Alby (1297), Le Châtelard (1301), Cluses and Sallanches (1310), La Roche (1335), etc. As for Annecy, it was not until November 19, 1367, that the charter was granted by Amadeus III of Geneva. However, historian Pierre Duparc estimates that the first charters may date back to 1309–1310, or possibly even the last quarter of the 13th century.

=== The plague in Savoy ===
The Black Death struck Europe in the mid-14th century and affected Savoy starting in 1348. It is said to have killed half of the population of the county. Subsequent outbreaks were recorded across all or part of Savoy in 1472, 1478, and again in 1545, 1564–1565, 1577, 1587, 1597, and 1598–1599. In the following century, three more outbreaks occurred (1615, 1629–1630, 1639–1640), with the final epidemic linked to the outbreak that affected Provence in 1720.

The practice of isolation only became common starting in the 16th century; before that, populations frequently turned to Saint Sebastian for protection. People also experimented with remedies, such as those collected in the parish registers of Saint-Paul-sur-Yenne.

== Christianization ==
Christianity spread to Savoy from the communities of Vienne and Lyon. Between the establishment of Christianity in these two cities in the 2nd century and the Christianization of the Alpine lands, it was not until the 5th and 6th centuries that the first dioceses were created, Tarentaise and Maurienne. Darantasia (modern-day Moûtiers) became the seat of the first diocese through a letter from Pope Leo the Great in May 450. The metropolis was elevated to an archbishopric in the 9th century (Synod of Frankfurt), extending its authority over the bishoprics of Aosta, Sion (which appeared around the 4th century), and Maurienne (which appeared in the 6th century). It was also around this time that the first bishop of Belley, Vincentius, was appointed, and that the church of Chambéry—“belonging to the deanery of Savoie and attached to the bishopric of Grenoble”—was founded.

Darantasia (Moûtiers) became the seat of the first diocese by a letter from Pope Leo the Great in May 450. The archdiocese became a metropolitan see in the 9th century (at the Council of Frankfurt), now overseeing the dioceses of Aosta, Sion (which appeared around the 4th century), and Maurienne (which appeared in the 6th century). In addition, around this time, the first bishop of Belley, Vincentius, was appointed, and the church of Chambéry, "belonging to the deanery of Savoy and attached to the diocese of Grenoble," was founded.

The late spread of Catholic Christianity can be partly explained by the fact that the Burgundians were an Arian people. Therefore, it was not until the 5th century that religious changes occurred, particularly with the conversion of King Sigismund by Saint Avitus, bishop of Vienne. To atone for the strangling of his son based on false accusations, Sigismund developed the Abbey of Agaune.

By the 10th century, the Church in the region had recovered from a challenging period marked by the Saracen raids, which had advanced up the Rhône Valley, and the seigneurial wars.

=== Territorial divisions of Savoy ===
Archivist Jules-Joseph Vernier outlines the ecclesiastical organization in the region, which remained unchanged between the 7th and 18th centuries. Here is a summary of this organization:

- Diocese of Geneva: With Geneva as its seat, a suffragan of the archdiocese of Lyon, it comprised eight deaneries with 389 parishes and 50 priories. The territory also included 27 convents or monasteries (including the abbeys of Bonmont, Hautecombe, Sainte-Marie d'Aulps, Abondance, Entremont, etc.), 21 hospitals, and 23 lazar houses.
- Diocese of Grenoble: A suffragan of the archbishopric of Vienne, it included some parishes from Savoy Proper located in the deanery of Grenoble, the archpriesthood of Viennois, the archpriesthood of Au-delà-du-Drac, and the deanery of Savoy (66 parishes, 16 priories).
- Diocese of Maurienne: With Saint-Jean-de-Maurienne as its seat, a suffragan of Turin and then of the archbishopric of Tarentaise, it included 102 parishes, 9 priories, the Franciscan convent of La Chambre, and the Cistercian abbey of Betton.
- Diocese of Tarentaise: With Moûtiers as its seat, elevated to an archbishopric in 794, it included the dioceses of Maurienne, Sion, and Aosta. It consisted of 84 parishes, one priory, and five convents, including the Abbey of Notre-Dame de Tamié.
- Diocese of Belley: With Belley as its seat, divided into eight archpriesthoods, it included 109 parishes, two abbeys, and eight priories.

=== Monastic establishment in Savoy ===
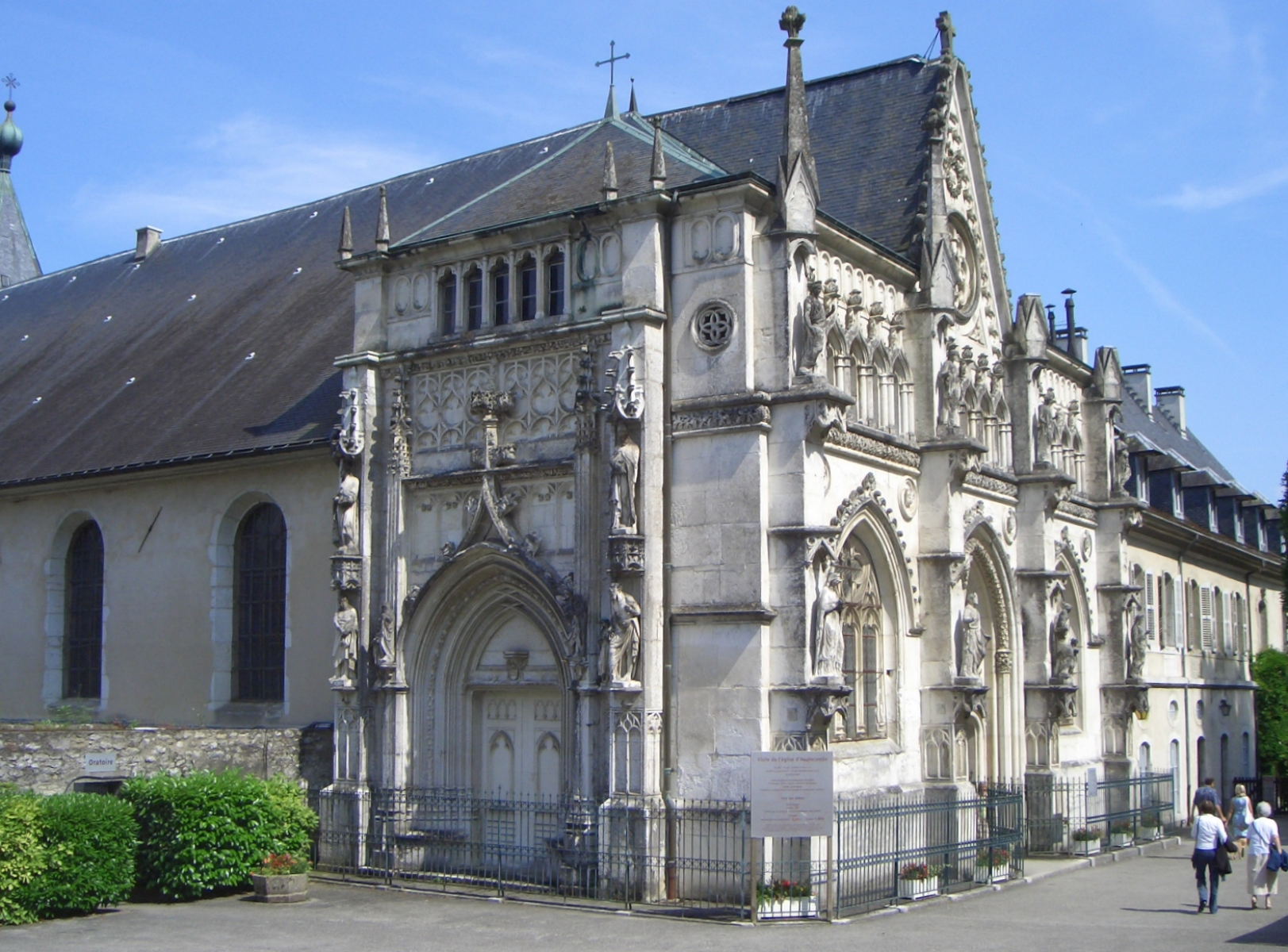
Hautecombe Abbey necropolis of the House of Savoy, founded in 1125 by Amadeus III of Savoy.

Following the European movement, the lands of Savoy were seeded with reformed abbeys (Benedictine, Cistercian, Augustinian, Carthusian) on the shores of lakes or in the valleys of the Pre-Alps, becoming centers of agricultural, artisanal, and cultural development. Monastic development in the Diocese of Geneva seems delayed and is attributed to the bishops of Geneva, particularly Guy de Faucigny and Ardutius de Faucigny. Historian Nicolas Carrier distinguishes "four forms of regular life" between the 11th and 12th centuries: Benedictine priories, daughters of the Abbey of Saint-Maurice of Agaune, institutions affiliated with the Cistercian order, and Carthusian establishments.

The first settlements, from the 10th century, were due to the Cluniac Benedictine order because of a "lack of competition." Other regional Benedictine monasteries gradually spread priories in the plains and slopes of Savoy: the Rhodanian abbeys of Saint-Martin de Savigny and Saint-Martin d'Ainay; the Jura abbeys of Saint-Oyand-de-Joux, Saint-Rambert-en-Bugey, and Ambronay; the Abbey of Saint-Chaffre in Velay; the Abbey of Saint-André-le-Bas of Vienne; and the Piedmontese abbeys of Novalaise and Saint-Michel-de-la-Cluse. These were established near major Alpine routes that led to the passes, providing access to the Italian peninsula. "Thus, there were no large establishments comparable to those [... in] Burgundy, [... in] Switzerland, or in the Massif Central, but a flourishing of small priories spread by Cluny, its affiliates, and its rivals."

Although many priories had relatively limited importance, some had curial charges.

List of main Abbey and Priory foundations, organized by Orders:

- Benedictine abbeys of Talloires (1019, County of Geneva), Contamine-sur-Arve (1083, Faucigny), Bonlieu (around 1160, County of Geneva). Priories of Coise (c. 1036, more likely in the following century, Savoie Propre), Les Échelles (1042, Petit-Bugey), Aiguebelle (1060, Maurienne), Chamonix (c. 1091 or 1202, Upper Faucigny), Rumilly (c. 1100, Albanais-Genevois), and Megève (attested in 1202, Val d'Arly-Faucigny).
- Augustinian Abbeys: Founded by monks from the Abbey of Saint-Maurice, Peillonex (1032, Chablais), Abondance (1108, Chablais), Sixt (1144, County of Geneva), Entremont (1154, Chablais).
- Cistercian Abbeys: Bellevaux (1091, Bauges, County of Savoy), Aulps (initially Benedictine in 1094, then affiliated with Cîteaux in 1136, Chablais), Tamié (1132, Genevois), Hautecombe (1125, Savoy Proper), Bellerive and du Lieu (1150, County of Geneva), Sainte-Catherine du Mont (1195, County of Geneva).
- Carthusian Monasteries: Vallon (1138, Chablais), Le Reposoir (1151, Faucigny), Pomier (1170, Genevois), Aillon (1178 or 1183, Bauges), Mélan (1292, Faucigny).

== Bibliography ==
=== Works, specialized chapters on the region ===
- Baud, Henri (1985). Le diocèse de Genève-Annecy [The diocese of Geneva-Annecy]. Histoire des diocèses de France (in French). Vol. 1. Éditions Beauchesne. ISBN 978-2-7010-1112-7.
- Brondy, Réjane; Demotz, Bernard; Leguay, Jean-Pierre (1984). La Savoie de l'an mil à la Réforme, XIe siècle-début XVIe siècle [Savoie from the year 1000 to the Reformation, 11th century-early 16th century]. Histoire de la Savoie (in French). Vol. 2. Rennes: Ouest-France. ISBN 2-85882-536-X.
- Coppier, Julien (2017). Châteaux et maisons fortes de Haute-Savoie [Castles and fortified houses of Haute-Savoie] (in French). Tours: Éditions Sutton.
- Demotz, Bernard (2008). Les Principautés dans l'Occident Médiéval : À l'origine des régions [The Principalities in the Medieval West: At the origin of the regions] (in French). Turnhout: Brepols. ISBN 978-2-503-52191-6.
- Demotz, Bernard (2000). Le comté de Savoie du XIe au XVe siècle : Pouvoir, château et État au Moyen Âge [The County of Savoy from the 11th to the 15th century: Power, castles and the State in the Middle Ages] (in French). Geneva: Slatkine. ISBN 2-05-101676-3.
- Demotz, Bernard (1987). Les comtes qui en 400 ans firent la Savoie [The counts who made Savoy over a period of 400 years] (in French). Chambéry: Société savoisienne d'histoire et d'archéologie. ISBN 2-00-008461-3.
- Favrod, Justin (2002). Les Burgondes. Un royaume oublié au cœur de l'Europe [The Burgundians. A forgotten kingdom in the heart of Europe] (in French). Vol. 4. Collection le savoir suisse. ISBN 978-2-88074-596-7.
- Guilleré, Christian; Poisson, Jean-Michel; Ripart, Laurent; Ducourthial, Cyrille (2008). Le royaume de Bourgogne autour de l'an mil [The Kingdom of Burgundy around the year 1000]. Sociétés, Religions, Politiques (in French). Chambéry: Université Savoie Mont Blanc. ISBN 978-2-915797-35-0.
  - Ducourthial, Cyrille (2008). "Géographie du pouvoir en pays de Savoie au tournant de l'an mil" [Geography of power in the Savoy region at the turn of the year 1000]. Op. cit (in French). pp. 207–245.
  - Ripart, Laurent (2008a). "Du royaume aux principautés : Savoie-Dauphiné, Xe – XIe siècles" [From the kingdom to the principalities: Savoie-Dauphiné, 10th–11th centuries]. Op. cit (in French). pp. 247–276.
- Leguay, Jean-Pierre (1992). Les Mérovingiens en Savoie : 534-751 [The Merovingians in Savoy: 534-751]. Mémoires et documents (in French). Vol. XXII. Montmélian: Académie de la Val d'Isère.
- Loup, Jean (1979). Les villes en Savoie et en Piémont au Moyen Âge [The cities in Savoy and Piedmont in the Middle Ages] (in French). Vol. 4. Édition du Centre d'études franco-italien.
- Rambaud, Placide; Vincienne, Monique (1964). Les transformations d'une société rurale, la Maurienne (1561-1962) [The transformations of a rural society, the Maurienne (1561-1962)]. Économie et sociologie de la montagne (in French). A Colin.

=== Journals ===
- Demotz, Bernard (1973). "La frontière au Moyen Âge d'après l'exemple du comté de Savoie (début XIIIe - début XVe siècles)" [The border in the Middle Ages, based on the example of the county of Savoy (early 13th to early 15th centuries)]. Actes des congrès de la Société des historiens médiévistes de l'enseignement supérieur public (in French). 4 (4): 95–116.
- Duparc, Pierre (1958). "La Sapaudia". Comptes rendus des séances de l'Académie des Inscriptions et Belles-Lettres (in French). 102 (4): 371–384.
- Ripart, Laurent (2008b). "Du royaume aux principautés : Savoie-Dauphiné, Xe – XIe siècles" [From the kingdom to the principalities: Savoie-Dauphiné, 10th–11th centuries]. Op. cit (in French). pp. 210–214.
