= Savoyard state =

European state from 1003 to 1861

Savoyard state Sabaudia (Latin) Stati di Savoia (Italian) États de Savoie (French)
- 1003–1861
- Flag Coat of arms of Kings of Sardinia
- Motto: FERT
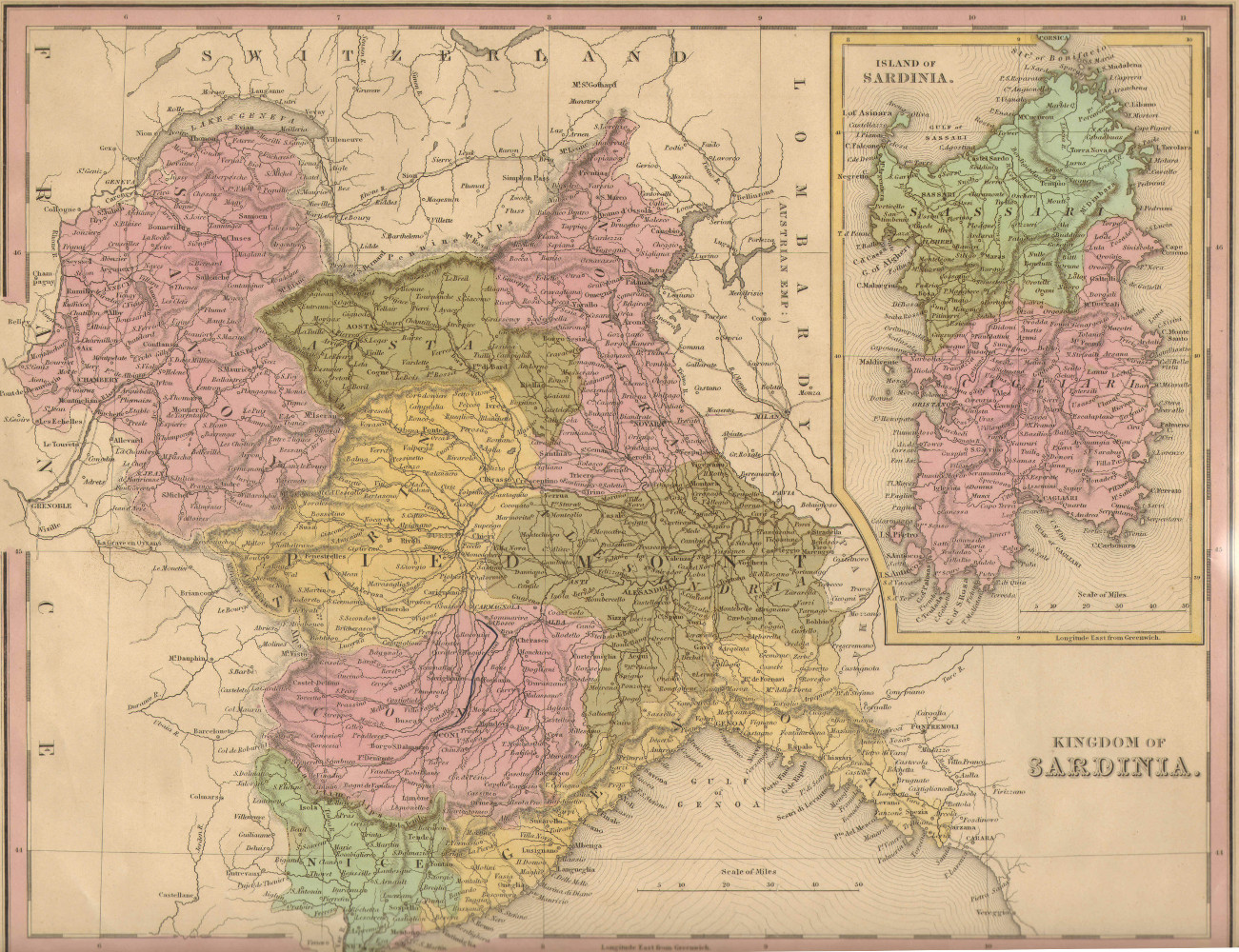
- The Savoyard state in 1839
- Status: Plurinational independent state Constituent territories of the Holy Roman Empire
- Capital: Montmélian (1006–1295); Chambéry (1295–1562); Turin (1562–1792; 1815–1861); Cagliari (1792–1815)
- Common languages: French, Italian, Piedmontese, Arpitan, Occitan, Latin
- Religion: Roman Catholicism
- Government: Composite monarchy
- Count Duke King
  - 1003–1048: Humbert I White Hands (first)
  - 1849–1861: Victor Emmanuel II of Sardinia (last)
- Historical era: Middle Ages; Early Modern Period
  - Humbert I became Count of Savoy: 1003
  - Savoy elevated to a duchy: 1416
  - Treaty of The Hague: 1720
  - Kingdom of Sardinia became Kingdom of Italy: 1861
Preceded by	Succeeded by
Kingdom of Burgundy	Kingdom of Italy
- Today part of: France; Italy

The Savoyard state comprised the states ruled by the House of Savoy from the Middle Ages to the formation of the Kingdom of Italy. An example of composite monarchy, it is a term applied to the polity by historians and was not in contemporary use. At the end of the 17th century, its population was about 1.4 million.

== History ==
The cradle of the Savoyard state was the feudal County and later Duchy of Savoy, originally part of the Kingdom of Burgundy along with the broader Savoy cultural-historical region. The gradual expansion of the Savoyard state led to the incorporation of territories such as Nice and Sardinia.

From the Middle Ages, the state comprised the Duchy of Savoy, the Principality of Piedmont, the Duchy of Aosta, and the County of Nice, all of which were formally part of the Holy Roman Empire; however, the Savoyards were independent diplomatic actors and often acted against the wishes of the Holy Roman Emperor, repeatedly siding with the French during the Franco-Habsburg Wars. The capital of the counts and dukes of Savoy was first Chambéry and later Turin.

The Prince-Bishopric of Geneva, today in Switzerland, was also part of the Savoyard state but eventually broke away and achieved independence as the Republic of Geneva.

From 1708, the Savoyard state included the Duchy of Montferrat, then the Kingdom of Sicily from 1713 until 1720, the Kingdom of Sardinia from 1720, and the Duchy of Genoa from 1815.

The Final Act of the Congress of Vienna of 1815 refers to the "States of His Majesty the King of Sardinia". Among contemporaries, "Kingdom of Sardinia" and "Sardinia" were used as common short forms, even though they were confounded with the island. "Piedmont", "Savoy-Piedmont", and "Piedmont-Sardinia" are also sometimes used to emphasise that the economic and political centre of the Savoyard state was Piedmont since the late Middle Ages. Each state had independent institutions and laws.

These territories formed a composite monarchy under the House of Savoy until the Perfect Fusion in 1847. The Jews of the state were granted emancipation the next year. In 1860, Turin was made the official capital.

By 1861, this unified state had acquired most of the other lands on the Italian Peninsula and formed the Kingdom of Italy. However, the historical cradle of the state, Savoy itself (comprising the present-day Savoie and Haute-Savoie French départements), was handed over to France along with the County of Nice in return for French military assistance against the Austrians, most prominently at the Battle of Solferino.

== Terminology ==
Scholarship has debated and used several different terms to reference the often disjointed possessions under control of the House of Savoy. Robert Oresko introduced the term "Sabaudian" in 1997.

== Territory ==
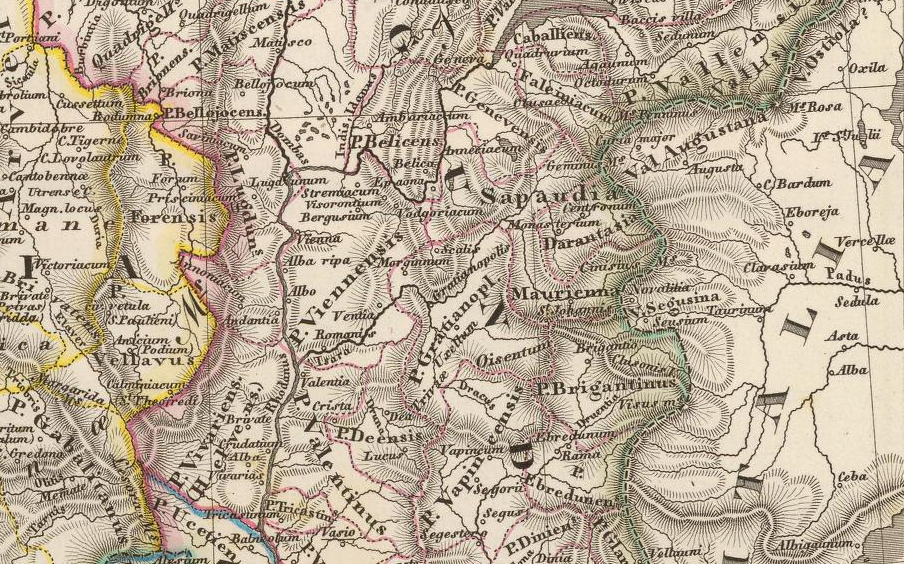
Savoy during the Carolingian Empire

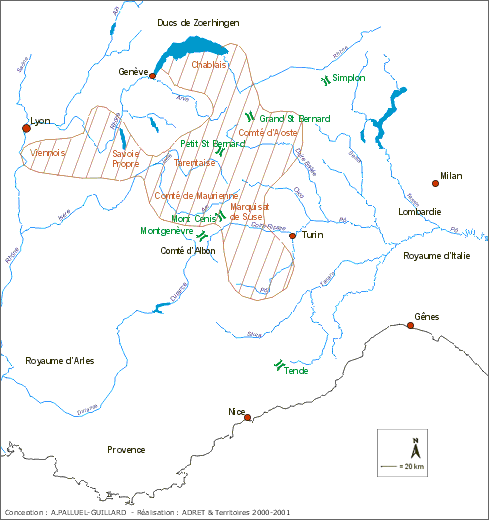
County of Savoy during the 12th

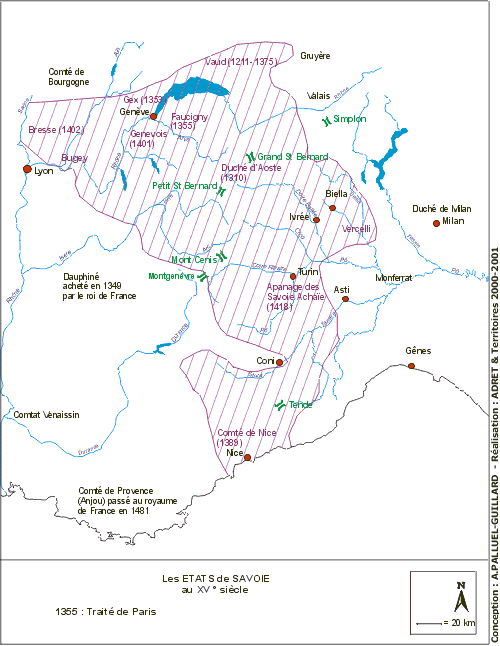
Duchy of Savoy in the 15th

Italian peninsula in 1843

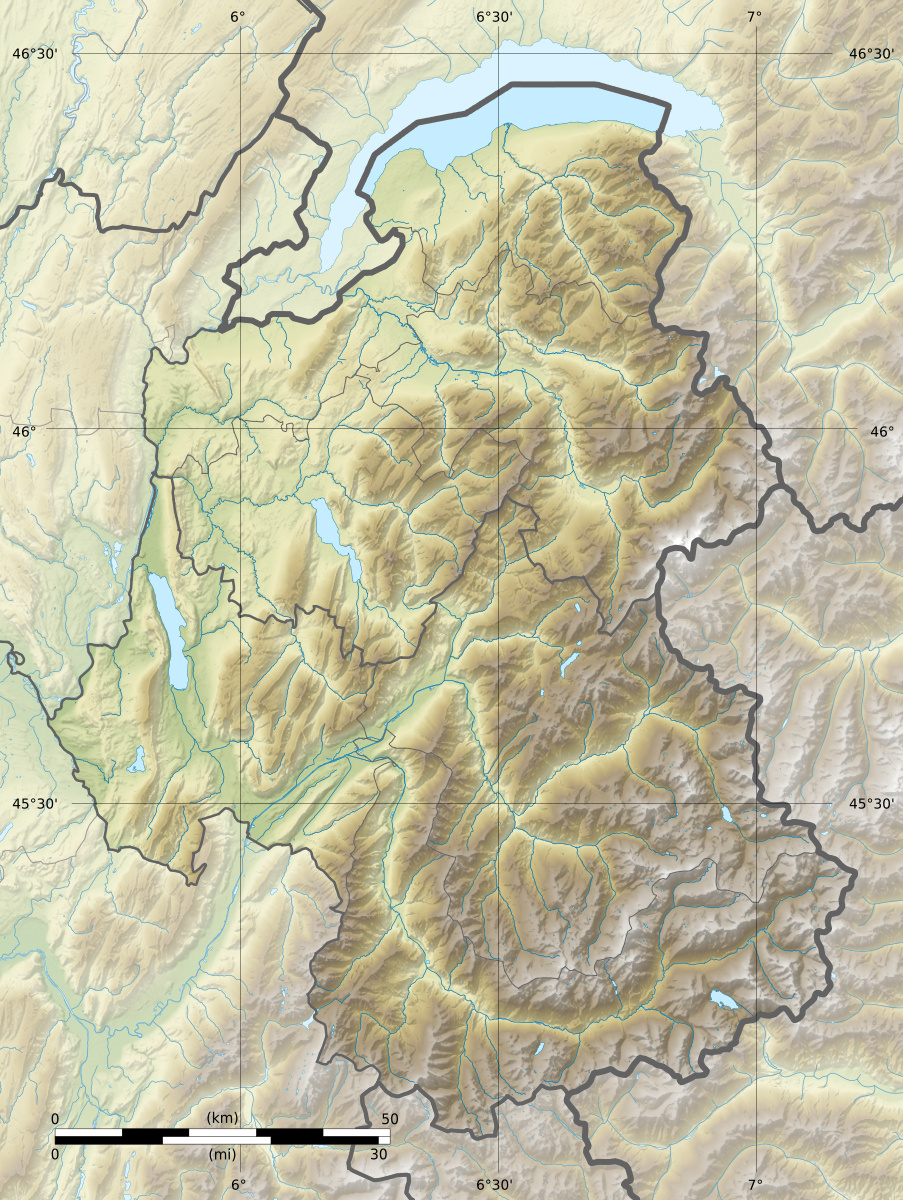
Proper Savoy today

Today's administrative Piedmont in Italy

== Flags ==
The first counts used the Holy Roman Empire banner as proof of their loyalty to the Emperor

Flag of the County of Savoy and Duchy of Savoy (1023–1783)

Flag of the Kingdom of Sardinia used in the late 18th century (1783–1802)

Flag of the Kingdom of Sardinia (1832–1848), obtained by merging the flags of Savoy, Sardinia and Genoa

Flag of Kingdom of Sardinia (1848–1861)
