= County of Savoy =

State of the Holy Roman Empire

County of Savoy Comitatus Sabaudiae (Latin)
- 1003–1416
- Imperial Banner (was used by the first counts to prove loyalty to the Emperor) Coat of arms

- The County of Savoy and its possessions ( red) within the Holy Roman Empire around the middle of the 13th century. The cream area highlights the rest of the Kingdom of Burgundy. Note that some of Savoy's possessions lie outside of that kingdom (instead being part of the Kingdom of Italy). Savoy proper is the westernmost of the territories. The unmarked territory directly to the northwest of Savoy proper, Bresse, was acquired in 1272.
- Status: State of the Holy Roman Empire
- Capital: Chambéry (from 1295)
- Religion: Roman Catholicism
- Government: Monarchy
- Count of Savoy
  - 1003–1048: Humbert I White Hands
  - 1391–1416: Amadeus VIII (Anti-Pope Felix V)
- Historical era: High Middle Ages
  - Created by Rudolph III, King of Burgundy: 1003
  - Inherited March of Turin: 1046
  - Emp. Henry VII acknowledged Imperial immediacy: 1331
  - Incorporated into the Kingdom of Germany by Emperor Charles IV: 1361
  - Acquired County of Nice: 1388
  - Acquired County of Geneva: 1401
  - Raised to duchy by Sigismund: 1416
Preceded by	Succeeded by
Kingdom of Arles	Duchy of Savoy
- 1. The Kingdom of Burgundy, to which the county owed suzerainty, became a part of the Empire on King Rudolph III's death in 1032; the County of Savoy gained Imperial immediacy from Emperor Henry VII in 1331.

The County of Savoy was a feudal state of the Holy Roman Empire which emerged, along with the free communes of Switzerland, from the collapse of the Kingdom of Burgundy in the 11th century. It was the cradle of the future Savoyard state.

== History ==
Early Coat of arms of the Counts of Savoy

Sapaudia, stretching south of Lake Geneva from the Rhône River to the Western Alps, had been part of Upper Burgundy ruled by the Bosonid duke Hucbert from the mid-9th century. Together with the neighbouring Free County of Burgundy (today's Franche Comté), it became part of the larger Kingdom of Burgundy under King Rudolph II in 933.

Humbert the White-Handed was raised to count by the last king of Burgundy, Rudolph III, in 1003. He backed the inheritance claims of Emperor Henry II and in turn, was permitted to usurp the county of Aosta from its bishops at the death of Anselm. Following his support of Conrad II in annexing Arles upon Rudolph's death and suppressing the revolts of Count Odo and Bishop Burchard, he also received the county of Maurienne (formerly held by the archbishops of Vienne) and territories in Chablais and Tarentaise, formerly held by its archbishops at Moûtiers.

While the Arelat remained a titular kingdom of the Holy Roman Empire, Humbert's descendants—later known as the House of Savoy—maintained their independence as counts. In 1046, his younger son Otto married Adelaide, daughter of Ulric Manfred II, marquis of Susa. When she inherited her father's lands in preference to other, male, relatives, (Note: One of whom may have been Gundulph, the father of St Anselm.) he thereby acquired control of the extensive March of Turin. This was then united with Savoy upon his inheritance from his elder brother.

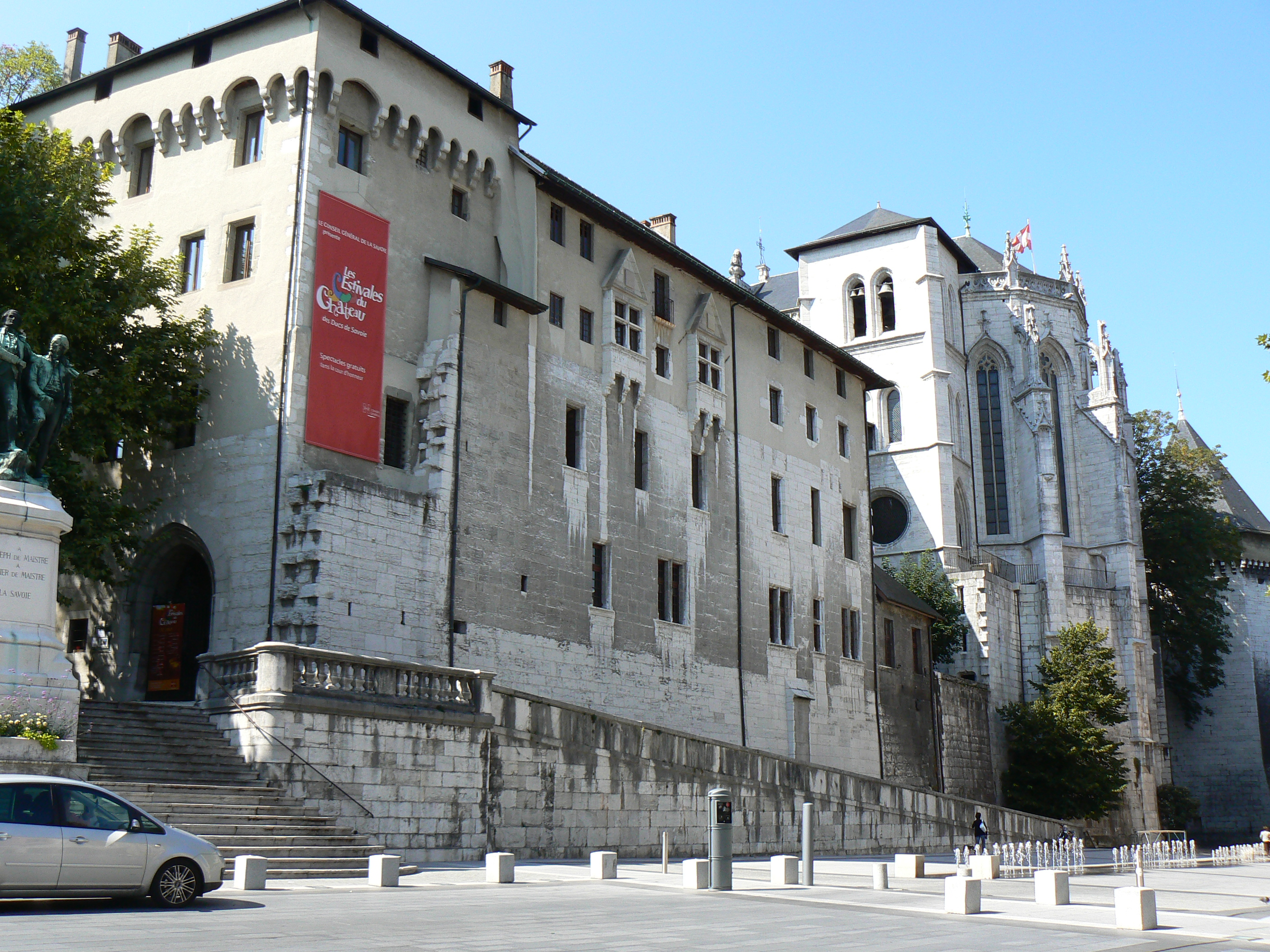
Chambéry Castle

The counts further enlarged their territory when, in 1218, they inherited the Vaud lands north of Lake Geneva from the extinct House of Zähringen. In 1220, Count Thomas I occupied the towns of Pinerolo and Chambéry (Kamrach), which afterwards became the Savoy capital. In 1240, his younger son Peter II was invited to England by King Henry III, who had married Peter's niece Eleanor of Provence. He was appointed Lord Warden of the Cinque Ports and Earl of Richmond and had the Savoy Palace erected in London.

In 1313, Count Amadeus V the Great officially gained the status of Imperial immediacy from Emperor Henry VII. What was left of the Kingdom of Burgundy effectively ceased to be entirely under the authority of the emperor after the Dauphiné had passed to the future King Charles V of France in 1349 and Amadeus VI of Savoy was appointed Imperial vicar of Arelat by Emperor Charles IV in 1365.

In 1361, Emperor Charles IV transferred the County of Savoy from the Kingdom of Burgundy to the Kingdom of Germany because of its strategic location.

Amadeus VII gained access to the Mediterranean Sea by the acquisition of the County of Nice in 1388, and his son Amadeus VIII purchased the County of Geneva in 1401. The extended Savoy lands were finally raised to a duchy in 1416 by the German king Sigismund (see Duchy of Savoy 1416–1718).

== Counts of Savoy ==
- Humbert I the White-Handed: 1003–1047/48
  - Amadeus I of the Tail, son: 1030/48–1051/56
  - Otto I, brother: 1051/56–1060
    - Peter I, son: 1060–78
    - Amadeus II, brother: 1078–80
    - Humbert II the Fat, brother: 1082/91–1103
      - Amadeus III, son: 1103–48
        - Humbert III the Blessed, son: 1148–89
          - Thomas, son: 1189–1233
            - Amadeus IV, son: 1233–53
              - Boniface, son: 1253–63
            - Peter II the Little Charlemagne, uncle: 1263–68
            - Philip I, brother: 1268–85
            - (Thomas, Count of Flanders, did not rule Savoy)
              - Amadeus V the Great, nephew: 1285–1323
                - Edward the Liberal, son: 1323–29
                - Aymon the Peaceful, brother: 1329–43
                  - Amadeus VI the Green Count, son: 1343–83
                    - Amadeus VII the Red Count, son: 1383–91
                      - Amadeus VIII the Peaceful, son: 1391–1416

In 1416 Amadeus VIII was raised to the status of Duke of Savoy.

== See also ==
- Savoie
- Haute-Savoie
- Piedmont
- Château des ducs de Savoie
- La Fléchère family
