= Amadeus I of Savoy =

Count of the House of Savoy (c. 1016–c. 1051)

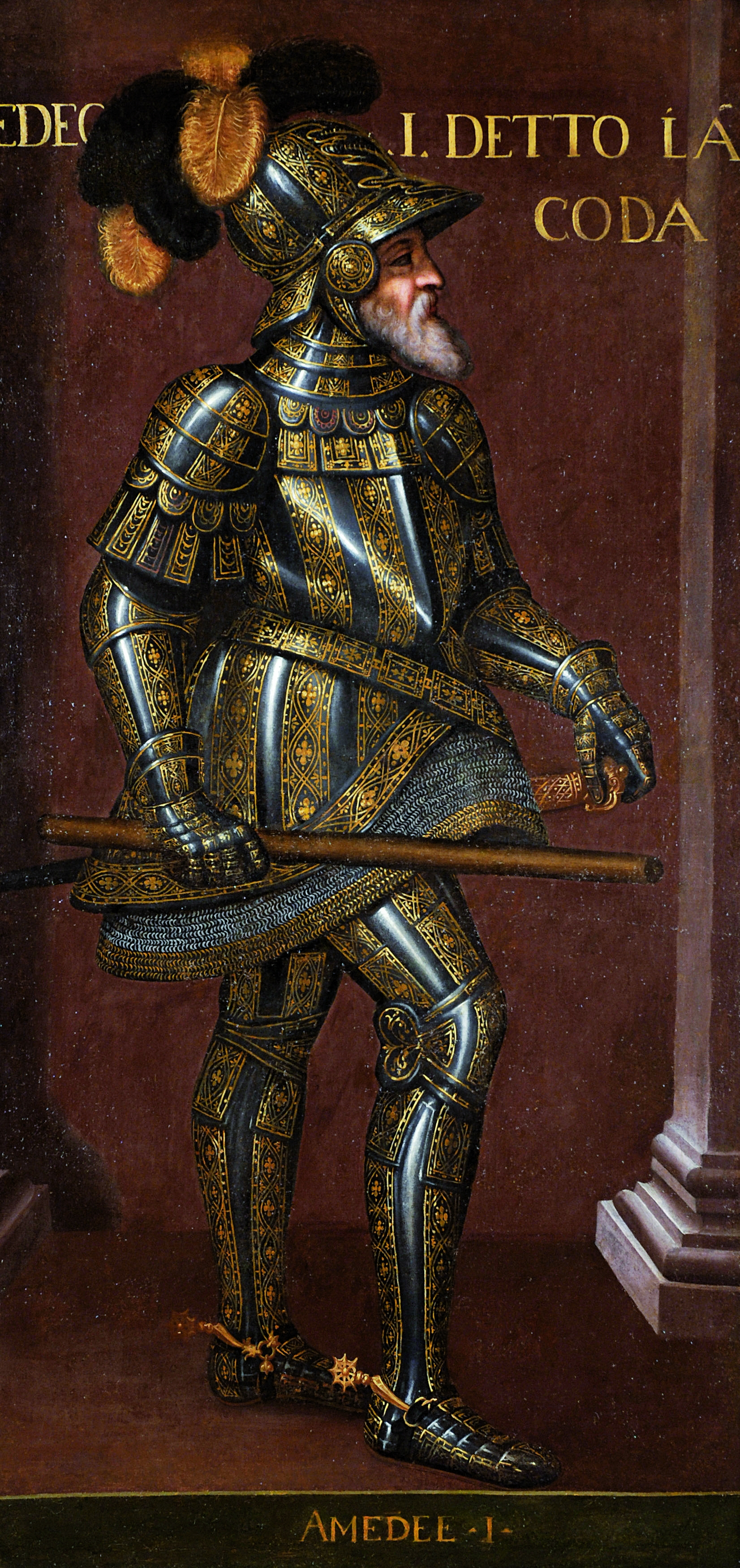
Portrait of Amadeus, painted centuries after his death

Amadeus I (c. 1016 – c. 1051), nicknamed of the Tail or la Coda (Latin caudatus, "tailed"), was an early count of the House of Savoy. He was probably the eldest son of Humbert I. His nickname derives from an anecdote, preserved only in a thirteenth-century manuscript, that when he met the Emperor Henry III at Verona in 1046, he refused to enter the emperor's chambers without his large train of knights, his "tail".

Amadeus is first attested in a document of 8 April 1022, when, along with his younger brother Burchard, bishop of Aosta, he witnessed a donation of Lambert, bishop of Langres, to his father. Probably sometime after this and before 1030, Amadeus, Burchard, and a third brother, Otto, joined their father in witnessing a donation made by one Aymon de Pierrefort to the Abbey of Cluny. In a further two undated charters of probably about the same period, Amadeus together with his brothers Otto and Aymon and his father made donations to the Abbey of Cluny and the church of Saint-Maurice at Matassine (Le Bourget-du-Lac). Amadeus and his father also witnessed another donation, made by several noblemen, to the Abbey of Savigny.

The first record of Amadeus's marriage and use of the title count comes from a single document dated 22 October 1030. On that date, at Grenoble, the count and his wife, Adelaide, of unknown family, gave the church of Matassine to Cluny. The act was witnessed by one Humbert and his wife Ausilia—who were perhaps Amadeus's father and mother—and also by his brother Otto and by the king and queen of Burgundy, Rudolf III and Ermengarda. Although the document of 1030 does not demonstrate that Amadeus and his father both held the rank of count simultaneously, Humbert's diploma of 1040 for the Diocese of Aosta was confirmed by his eldest son bearing the title count. On 21 January 1042 Amadeus, Otto and Aymon confirmed another diploma of their father, favouring the church of Saint-Chaffre. On 10 June, Count Amadeus, Count Humbert and Otto donated the church of Echelles to the church of Saint-Laurence in Grenoble. There is no notice of Amadeus's activities for the following decade, and his last action was recorded on 10 December 1051. In this document, he is called "Count of Belley" (comes Bellicensium), but it is almost certainly the same Count Amadeus as the son of Humbert I.

According to fourteenth-century sources, Amadeus died shortly after 1051 and was buried in Saint-Jean-de-Maurienne. His son Humbert had predeceased him, but he left behind a son, Aymon, who became Bishop of Belley. He may have had a daughter who married into the family of the Counts of Geneva. He was succeeded by his brother Otto in the countship.

Amadeus I House of Savoy
Preceded by Humbert I	Count of Savoy; 1030–1051	Succeeded by Otto
