= Duchy of Aosta =

Italian Duchy ruled by Savoy

Duchy of Aosta Duché d'Aoste (French)
- 11th century–1766
- Coat of arms

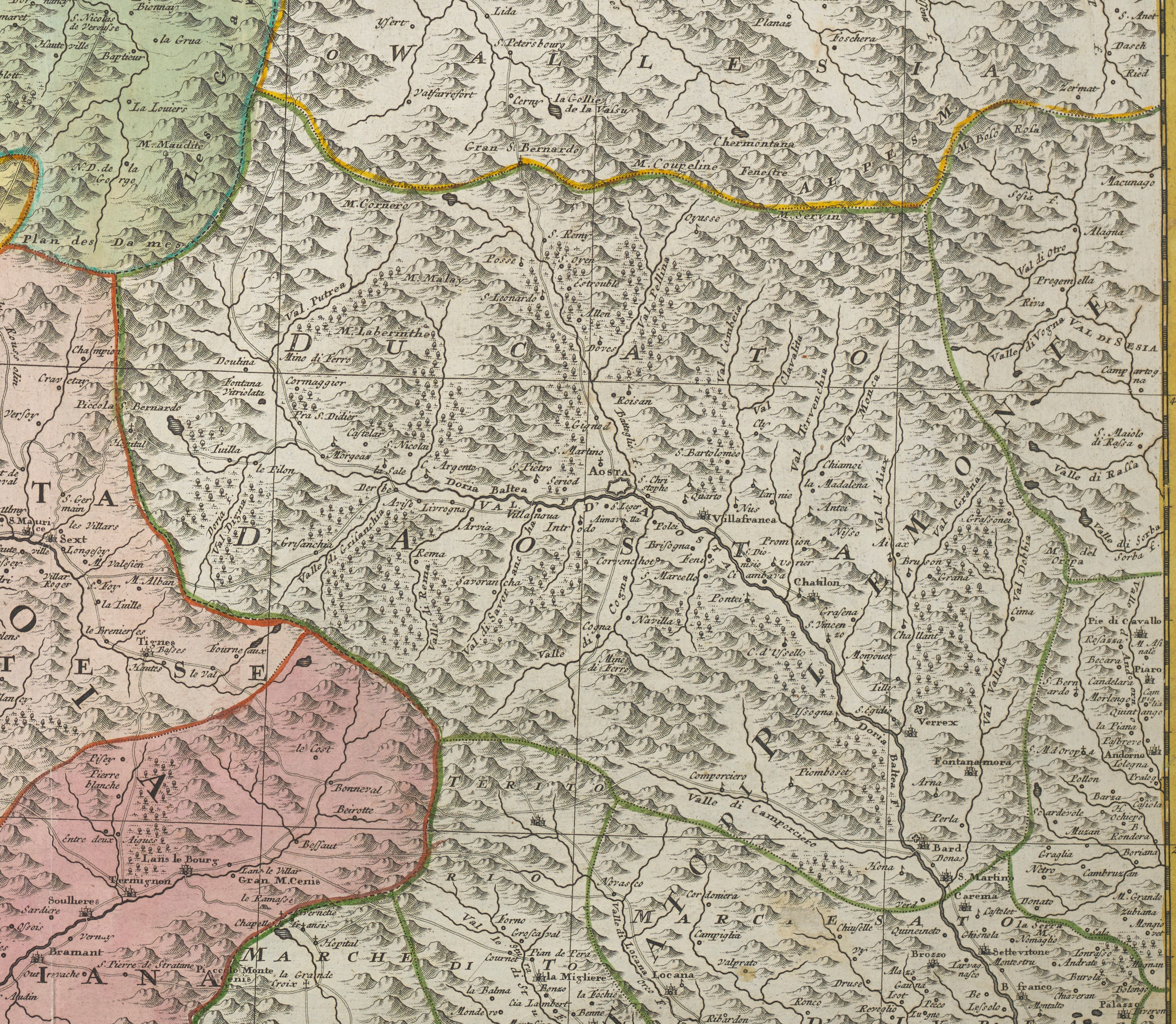
- Duchy of Aosta in 1749
- Status: Duchy of the Savoyard State
- Capital: Aosta
- Common languages: Arpitan, Valdôtain; Official: French
- Religion: Catholicism
- Government: Duchy
- Duke of Aosta
- History
  - Raised to duchy: 11th century
  - French made official language: 1561
  - Disestablished: 1766
Succeeded by
Doire
- Today part of: Aosta Valley

The Duchy of Aosta, originally the County of Aosta, was a realm ruled by the House of Savoy from the early 11th century until the late 18th, when its independent institutions were aligned with those of the Principality of Piedmont. The title "Duke of Aosta" continued to be used by the second sons of the Savoyard monarch. The land of the duchy is today a part of Italy.

The county of Aosta was originally ruled by the bishops of Aosta in the 10th and early 11th centuries. Upon the death of Bishop Anselm in 1026, however, Conrad the Salic ensured that the secular powers of the important Alpine territory passed to the bishop's brother-in-law, his ally Humbert the White-handed, rather than remaining tied to the diocese, which fell to Anselm's unfriendly nephew Burchard. Humbert's son Odo then wed Adelaide, securing the March of Turin. The county was elevated to a duchy by Frederick Barbarossa.

Duke Emmanuel Philibert made French the official language of the duchy in 1561, replacing Latin in administration and judicial proceedings. French had long been the language of official documents, while the population spoke a dialect of Arpitan, known as Valdôtain as their traditional vernacular. The duchy retained its own traditional institutions as late as 1766. It received its first intendant in 1773. It had its own taxation system down to 7 October 1783, when it was brought under the cadaster. According to Jean-Baptiste de Tillier (died 1744):

The duchy of Aosta has always been a state, forming a single undivided body. The seventy-eight church-towers, or rather the cities, towns, parishes and separate communities which exist in the Valley, are members of this state.

== Institution of knighthood ==
Reflecting trends often found in the Italian states as a whole, many Aostan knights were familiar with both the local castle court cultures of the lands they often helped to govern and the larger-scale courts of the Savoyard state which variously competed with, governed over, hired from, and worked with noble families that produced knights.

During the disappearance of feudalism, knights and other nobles "transformed into a class of courtiers and officials" for the duke.

== See also ==
- Diocese of Aosta
- Aosta Valley

== Sources ==
- Farrell-Vinay, Giovanna (2005), "Welfare Provision in Piedmont", Health Care and Poor Relief in 18th- and 19th-century Southern Europe, Burlington: Ashgate, pp. 250–88.
- Kain, Roger J.P.; et al. (1992), The Cadastral Map in the Service of the State: A History of Property Mapping, Chicago: University of Chicago Press.
- Rule, Martin (1883), The Life and Times of St. Anselm, Archbishop of Canterbury and Primate of the Britons, Vol. I, London: Kegan Paul, Trench, & Co., ISBN 978-1-9741-1907-3
- Street, Jack D. (1998), "The Independence of Savoy and Autonomy of the Valle D'Aosta", The French Review, Vol. 71, No. 3, pp. 396–404.
