= County of Maurienne =

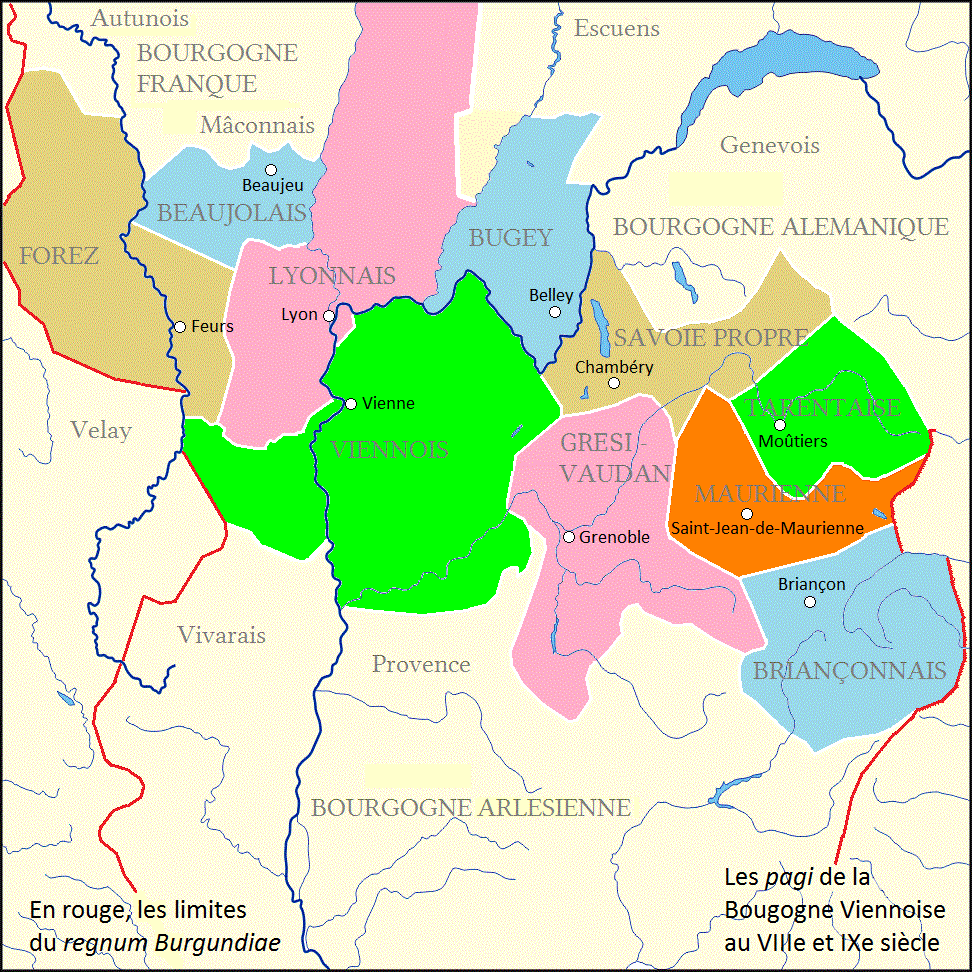
Map of Maurienne c. 8-9th Century

The County of Maurienne (Latin: Comitatus Maurianensis; Arpitan: Comtât de Moryèna; French: Comté de Maurienne; Italian: Contea di Moriana) was a county in the Maurienne Valley of Upper Burgundy during the Middle Ages. Its seat was Saint-Jean-de-Maurienne.

In the 6th century, King Guntram raised the church of Maurienne into an episcopal see. In 753, Grifo was defeated by the forces of Pepin the Short in the valley on his way to Italy. The county was bestowed upon Humbert the White-Handed in 1032 for his assistance in Conrad the Salian's Italian campaigns against Aribert, archbishop of Milan. He was buried in Saint-Jean's cathedral. Along with Savoy proper (Sapaudia), this formed the nucleus of the county of Savoy which developed into the kingdoms of Sardinia and Italy under Humbert's dynasty. Maurienne continued to be noted in the formal titles of the Sardinian and Italian kings. During the unification of Italy, however, the Maurienne Valley itself was ceded to Napoleon III's France, where it now forms the commune of Saint-Jean-de-Maurienne.

Subordinate to the counts were hereditary viscounts at Aiguebelle and La Chambre, who held the power of low justice over their subjects. High justice (jurisdiction over capital crimes) was reserved to the counts. In 1240, the count acquired the estates of Pierre Guigue du Villar in order to better control access to the Col du Mont-Cenis. The counts also built a castle Hermillon, from which their castellans could monitor events in Saint-Jean-de-Maurienne, where the bishop held secular authority. From Hermillon the castellans also exacted tolls for the counts on travellers to and from Mont-Cenis.

Arms of Maurienne
