= House of Savoy =

Royal dynasty of Savoy, Italy, and Italian Colonies

- Country: County of Savoy; Duchy of Savoy; Kingdom of Sicily; Kingdom of Sardinia; Kingdom of Italy; Kingdom of Spain; Kingdom of France
- Founded: 1003; 1023 years ago
- Founder: Humbert I of Savoy
- Current head: Disputed: Emanuele Filiberto of Savoy, Prince of Venice; Prince Aimone, Duke of Aosta
- Final ruler: Umberto II of Italy
- Titles: See list: Count of Savoy (1003–1416); Duke of Savoy (1416–1861); King of Cyprus (1485–1946); King of Jerusalem (1485–1946); King of Armenia (1485–1946); King of Sicily (1713–1720); King of Sardinia (1720–1861); King of England, Scotland, France, and Ireland (Jacobite claim, 1807–1840); King of Italy (1861–1946); King of Spain (1870–1873); Emperor of Ethiopia (1936–1941); King of Albania (1939–1943); King of Croatia (1941–1943)
- Estates: See list: Quirinal Palace; Royal Palace of Turin; Royal Palace of Milan; Royal Palace of Naples; Royal Palace of Caserta; Royal Palace of Venaria Reale; Royal Palace of Capodimonte; Royal Villa of Monza; Palazzina di caccia of Stupinigi; Palazzo Madama; Palazzo Carignano; Palazzo Margherita; Villa Ada; Villa della Regina; Castle of Valentino; Castle of Racconigi; Castle of Rivoli; Castle of Agliè; Castle of Moncalieri; Castle of La Mandria; Castle of Govone; Pollenzo Estate
- Deposition: June 12, 1946; 80 years ago: Umberto II left Italy as a result of the institutional referendum
- Cadet branches: See list: Savoy-Morsini-Del demonico; Savoy-Carignano; Savoy-Aosta; Savoy-Villafranca-Soissons; Savoy-Genoa (extinct 1996); Savoy-Villafranca (extinct 1888); Savoy-Soissons (extinct 1734); Savoy-Nemours (extinct 1659); Savoy-Racconigi (extinct 1605); Savoy-Tende (extinct 1580); Savoy-Acaia/Achaea (extinct 1418); Savoy-Vaud (extinct 1359)
- Website: ordinidinasticicasasavoia.it

The House of Savoy (Italian: Casa Savoia, French: Maison de Savoie, Arpitan: Mêson de Savouè) is a royal house that was established in 1003 in the historical region of Savoy, which was originally part of the Kingdom of Burgundy and now lies mostly within southeastern France. Through gradual expansions, the family grew in power, first ruling the County of Savoy, a small Alpine county northwest of Italy, and later gaining absolute rule of the Kingdom of Sicily. During the years from 1713 to 1720, they were handed the Kingdom of Sardinia and would exercise direct rule from then onward as Piedmont–Sardinia, which was the legal predecessor state of the Kingdom of Italy and the Italian Empire, which in turn are the predecessors of the present-day Italian Republic.

From the ruling of a région on the France–Italy border, to the abolition of monarchy in Italy, the dynasty's realm grew to include nearly all of the Italian peninsula. By 1861, the House of Savoy led the Italian unification, through its cadet branch Carignano and would go on to rule the Kingdom of Italy until 1946. They also briefly ruled the Kingdom of Spain during the 19th century. The Italian Savoyard kings were: Victor Emmanuel II, Umberto I, Victor Emmanuel III, and Umberto II. Umberto II reigned for only a few weeks, as the last king of Italy, before being deposed following the 1946 Italian institutional referendum, after which the Italian Republic was proclaimed.

== History ==
=== Early history ===
The name derives from the historical region of Savoy in the Alps between what is now France and Italy. Over time, the House of Savoy expanded its territory and influence through judicious marriages and international diplomacy. The house descended from Humbert I, Count of Sabaudia, also known as Umberto I "Biancamano" (1003–1047 or 1048). The ancestry of Humbert is uncertain, as contemporary documents make no mention of his father. His family was traditionally believed to have come from Saxony; more recent investigations into the 21st century pointed to the County of Vienne, where both Humbert and his relatives held extensive possessions, as a more plausible origin.

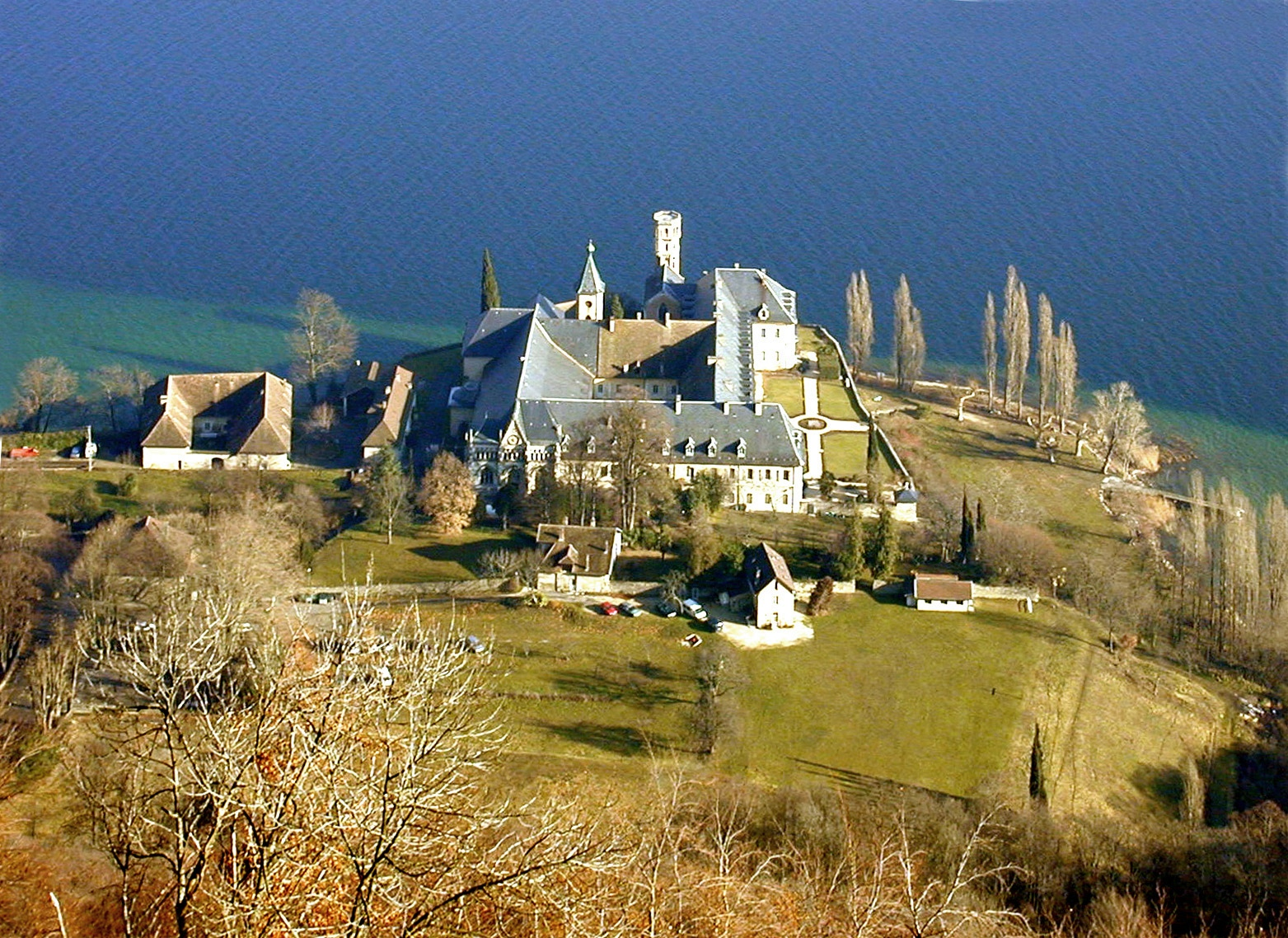
Hautecombe Abbey, where many of the dukes are buried

Although Sabaudia was originally a poor county, later counts were diplomatically skilled, and gained control over strategic mountain passes in the Alps. Two of Humbert's sons were commendatory abbots at the Abbey of St. Maurice, Agaunum, on the river Rhône east of Lake Geneva, and Saint Maurice is still the patron of the House of Savoy. Humbert's son, Otto of Savoy, succeeded to the title in 1051 after the death of his elder brother Amadeus I of Savoy. Otto married the Marchioness Adelaide of Turin, bringing the Marquessate of Susa, with the towns of Turin and Pinerolo, into the House of Savoy's possession. They once had claims on the modern canton of Vaud, where they occupied the Château of Chillon in Switzerland; their access to it was cut by Geneva during the Protestant Reformation, after which it was conquered by the Canton of Bern. Meanwhile, Piedmont was later joined with Sabaudia, and the name evolved into Savoy (Italian: Savoia).

=== Expansion, retreat, and prosperity ===
A map of Italy in 1494

By the time Amadeus VIII came to power in the late 14th century, the House of Savoy had gone through a series of gradual territorial expansions and he was elevated by Sigismund, the Holy Roman Emperor, to the Duke of Savoy in 1416. In 1494, Charles VIII of France passed through Savoy on his way to Italy and Naples, which initiated the Italian War of 1494–1495. During the outbreak of the Italian war of 1521–1526, the Holy Roman Emperor Charles V stationed imperial troops in Savoy. In 1536, Francis I of France invaded Savoy and Piedmont, taking Turin by April of that year. Charles III Duke of Savoy, fled to Vercelli.

When Emmanuel Philibert came to power in 1553, most of his family's territories were in French hands, so he offered to serve France's leading enemy the House of Habsburg in the hope of recovering his lands. He served Philip II of Spain as Governor of the Netherlands (then part of the Seventeen Provinces) from 1555 to 1559. In this capacity, he led the Spanish invasion of northern France and won a victory in the battle of St. Quentin in 1557. He took advantage of various squabbles in Europe to slowly regain territory from both the French and the Spanish, including the city of Turin. He moved the capital of the duchy from Chambéry to Turin.

The 17th century brought about economic development to the Turin area and the House of Savoy took part in and benefitted from that. Charles Emmanuel II developed the port of Nice and built a road through the Alps towards France, and through skillful political manoeuvres the territorial expansion continued. In the early 18th century during the War of the Spanish Succession, future King Victor Amadeus II switched sides to assist the Habsburgs, and via the Treaty of Utrecht they rewarded him with large pieces of land in northeastern Italy and a Crown in Sicily. Savoy rule over Sicily lasted only seven years (1713–1720).

=== Kingdom of Italy ===
A map of Italy in 1796

The crown of Sicily, the prestige of being kings at last, and the wealth of Palermo helped strengthen the House of Savoy further. In 1720, they were forced to exchange Sicily for the Kingdom of Sardinia as a result of the War of the Quadruple Alliance. On the mainland, the dynasty continued its expansionist policies as well. Through advantageous alliances during the War of the Polish Succession and War of the Austrian Succession, King Charles Emmanuel III gained new lands at the expense of the Austrian-controlled Duchy of Milan.

In 1792, Piedmont–Sardinia joined the First Coalition against the French First Republic. It was beaten in 1796 by Napoleon and forced to conclude the disadvantageous Treaty of Paris, giving the French army free passage through Piedmont. In 1798, Barthélemy Catherine Joubert occupied Turin and forced Charles Emmanuel IV to abdicate and leave for the island of Sardinia. In 1814, the kingdom was restored and enlarged with the addition of the former Republic of Genoa by the Congress of Vienna.

A map of Italy in 1843

In the meantime, Italian nationalist figures like Giuseppe Mazzini were influencing popular opinion. Mazzini believed that Italian unification could only be achieved through a popular uprising. After the failure of the Revolutions of 1848 in the Italian states, the nationalists began to look to the Kingdom of Sardinia and its prime minister Camillo Benso, Count of Cavour as leaders of the unification movement. In 1848, King Charles Albert conceded a constitution known as the Statuto Albertino to Piedmont–Sardinia, which remained the basis of the kingdom's legal system even after Italian unification was achieved and the Kingdom of Sardinia became the Kingdom of Italy in 1861.

The Kingdom of Italy was the first Italian state to include the Italian peninsula since the fall of the Roman Empire. When Victor Emmanuel was crowned King of Italy in 1861, his realm did not include the Venetia region (subject to Habsburg governance), Lazio (with Rome), Umbria, Marche, and Romagna (with the Papal town of Bologna). Yet the House of Savoy continued to rule Italy for several decades through the Italian independence wars as Italian unification proceeded and even as the First World War raged on in the early 20th century.

=== Massacres ===
In April 1655, based on perhaps false reports of resistance by the Waldensians, a Protestant religious minority, to a plan to resettle them in remote mountain valleys, Charles Emmanuel II ordered their general massacre, which became known as the Piedmontese Easter. The massacre was so brutal it aroused indignation throughout Europe. Oliver Cromwell, then ruler in England, began petitioning on behalf of the Waldensians, writing letters, raising contributions, calling a general fast in England, and threatening to send military forces to the rescue. The massacre prompted John Milton's famous sonnet, "On the Late Massacre in Piedmont".

In 1898, the Bava Beccaris massacre in Milan involved the use of cannons against unarmed protesters (including women and the elderly) during riots over the rising price of bread. King Umberto I of the House of Savoy congratulated General Fiorenzo Bava Beccaris for the massacre and decorated him with the medal of Great Official of Savoy Military Order, greatly outraging a large part of the public opinion. As a result, Umberto I was assassinated in July 1900 in Monza by Gaetano Bresci, the brother of one of the women massacred in the crowd, who had traveled back to Italy from the United States for the assassination. The king had previously been the target of failed assassination attempts by anarchists Giovanni Passannante and Pietro Acciarito.

=== Fascism and end of monarchy ===
When the First World War ended, the Treaty of Versailles fell short of what had been promised in the London Pact to Italy. As the economic conditions in Italy worsened after the war, popular resentment and along with it the seeds of Italian fascism began to grow and resulted in the March on Rome by Benito Mussolini. General Pietro Badoglio advised King Victor Emmanuel III that he could easily sweep Mussolini and his rag-tag Blackshirt army to one side but Victor Emmanuel decided to tolerate Mussolini and appointed him as prime minister of Italy on 28 October 1922. The king remained silent as Mussolini engaged in one abuse of power after another from 1924 onward, and did not intervene in 1925–1926 when Mussolini dropped all pretense of democracy. By the end of 1928, the king's right to remove Mussolini from office was, at least theoretically, the only check on his power. Later, the king's failure, in the face of mounting evidence, to move against the Mussolini regime's abuses of power led to much criticism and had dire future consequences for Italy and for the monarchy itself.

After their invasion in 1935, Italy conquered Ethiopia in the Second Italo-Ethiopian War and Victor Emmanuel was crowned as Emperor of Ethiopia. He also added the Albanian crown 1939 but lost Ethiopia as part of the East African campaign in 1941; however, as Mussolini and the Axis powers failed in the Second World War in 1943, several members of the Italian court began putting out feelers to the Allies of World War II, who in turn let it be known that Mussolini had to go. After Mussolini received a vote of no confidence from the Fascist Grand Council on 24 July, Victor Emmanuel dismissed him from office, relinquished the Ethiopian and Albanian crowns, and appointed Pietro Badoglio as prime minister. On 8 September, the new government announced it had signed an armistice with the Allies five days earlier; however, Victor Emmanuel made another blunder when he and his government fled south to Brindisi, leaving his army without orders.

As the Allies and the Italian Resistance gradually chased the Nazis and fascists off the peninsula, it became apparent that Victor Emmanuel was too tainted by his earlier support of Mussolini to have any postwar role. Accordingly, Victor Emmanuel transferred most of his powers to his son, Crown Prince Umberto, in April 1944. Rome was liberated two months later, and Victor Emmanuel transferred his remaining powers to Umberto and named him Lieutenant General of the Realm. Within a year, public opinion pushed for a referendum to decide between retaining the monarchy or becoming a republic. On 9 May 1946, in a last-ditch attempt to save the monarchy, Victor Emmanuel formally abdicated in favour of his son, who became Umberto II. It did not work as the 1946 Italian institutional referendum was won by republicans with 54% of the vote. Victor Emmanuel went into exile in Egypt, dying there a year later.

On 12 June 1946, the Kingdom of Italy formally came to an end as Umberto II transferred his powers to the prime minister Alcide de Gasperi and called for the Italian people to support the new republic. He then went into exile in Portugal, never to return; he died in 1983. The Constitution of the Italian Republic includes the entrenched clause that the republican form of government cannot be changed by constitutional amendment, thus forbidding any attempt to restore the monarchy short of adoption of an entirely new constitution. The Constitution of Italy also forbade male descendants of the House of Savoy from entering Italy. This provision was removed in 2002; as part of the deal to be allowed back into Italy, Vittorio Emanuele, the last claimant to the House of Savoy, renounced all claims to the throne. He died in 2024.

=== Controversies, damage claims against Italy, and internal disputes ===
The Residences of the Royal House of Savoy in Turin and the neighbourhood are protected as a World Heritage Site. Although the titles and distinctions of the Italian royal family are not legally recognised by the Italian Republic, the remaining members of the House of Savoy, like dynasties of other abolished monarchies, still use some of the various titles they acquired over the millennium of their reign prior to the republic's establishment, including Duke of Savoy; Prince of Naples, previously conferred by Joseph Bonaparte to be hereditary on his children and grandchildren; Prince of Piedmont; and Duke of Aosta.

Previously, the leadership of the House of Savoy was contested by two cousins: Vittorio Emanuele, Prince of Naples, who used to claim the title of King of Italy, and Prince Amedeo, Duke of Aosta, who claimed the title of Duke of Savoy. Supporters of Vittorio Emanuele and his descendents are known as Legitimists while supporters of Amedeo and his descendents are known as Aostaists. Their rivalry was not always peaceful. On 21 May 2004, following a dinner held by King Juan Carlos I of Spain on the eve of the wedding of his son Felipe, Prince of Asturias, Vittorio Emanuele punched Amedeo twice in the face.

In 1969, Vittorio Emanuele made his unilateral declaration of kingship, arguing that by agreeing to submit to a referendum on his place as head of state, his father (Umberto II) had thereby abdicated. Vittorio Emanuele took this action after his father allegedly called for Amedeo to visit him in Portugal to name him his heir. Under his self-assumed powers as King of Italy, Vittorio Emanuele conferred the title of Duchess of Sant'Anna di Valdieri on his then-fiancée Marina Doria. In 1983, after the death of his father, with the support of the Italian Freemasonry (like many personalities of the Italian ruling class who promoted the repeal of the transitional provisions and the return to Italy, he was registered with Licio Gelli's Masonic lodge Propaganda Due with membership number 1621), as well as scattered pieces of the Italian Monarchist Party, Vittorio Emanuele proclaimed himself King of Italy as Vittorio Emanuele IV and became the historical and political reference of the House of Savoy. In 2002, statements were published in which he accepted the end of the monarchy, and both Vittorio Emanuele and his son Emanuele Filiberto of Savoy swore loyalty to the Italian Republic and its president.

In 1997, Vittorio Emanuele said on TG2 that the antisemitic laws passed under Mussolini's regime were "not so bad". Vittorio Emanuele reconsidered his words the day after and spoke of a "grave mistake", but he did not apologize. In 2002, with a statement issued from Geneva on the same day the Italian racial laws of 1938 had been given royal assent by the king, for the first time in the history of the House of Savoy, Vittorio Emanuele officially distanced himself from the antisemitic laws, and since then had tried to repair the damage by saying that the antisemitic laws had left "an indelible stain" and were the "darkest chapter" in his family's history. The 2002 statement read: "The date of 10 November, which until now represented for us the memory of an indelible stain on the history of the family, now constitutes, by a singular twist of fate, a new, fundamental stage towards the long-awaited return to the Homeland." When the Savoys returned to Italy in 2003, they were met with complaints that Vittorio Emanuele and his family had made no attempt at reconciliation with the Jewish community, which was not satisfied and continued to demand a "clear sign that they have rejected that period of history". In an interview with the Corriere della Sera, the Union of Italian Jewish Communities president Amos Luzzatto stated: "I'm not saying it was he who signed the racial laws in 1938. But, as a Savoy heir, [Vittorio Emanuele] has never distanced himself from them." On 27 January 2005, in a letter published by the Corriere della Sera, Vittorio Emanuele issued an apology to Italy's Jewish population, asking forgiveness from the Italian Jewish community, and declaring that it was an error for the Italian royal family to have signed the racial laws of 1938.

On 20 September 2018, during a celebration for the 100th anniversary of the Great War, Emanuele Filiberto stated: "The racial laws are a disgrace for Italy, for what happened." This was seen as a timid admission of guilt and was criticised by the local Jewish community. Shalom, the organ of the Jewish Community of Rome, commented: "We don't like the words of Emanuele Filiberto of Savoy because they are ambiguous... and they want to water down responsibility. The racial laws are first and foremost a disgrace—not for Italy—but first and foremost for the House of Savoy which allowed without batting an eyelid—just to give an example—that dozens of Jewish officers who had served during the First World War, and who had been awarded Medals of Military Valor and who held positions of great responsibility, were expelled from the Royal Army." In January 2021, ahead of Holocaust Memorial Day in Italy, Emanuele Filiberto wrote a letter to Italy's Jewish community in which he said his family's role in rubber-stamping Mussolini's antisemitic laws caused "a wound still open for the whole of Italy", that he and his relatives "dissociate ourselves firmly" from Victor Emmanuel III who approved Mussolini's rise to power and gave the antisemitic laws royal assent, and asked for forgiveness for the king's actions. The letter was dismissed by historians as "too little too late", and was criticised by Jewish groups who condemned the family's lengthy reluctance to acknowledge its role in the Holocaust. In the letter, Emanuele Filiberto stated: "I condemn the 1938 racial laws, all of whose weight I still feel on my shoulders to this day, and with me the whole royal house ... they are a disgrace for the entire Royal House of Savoy. ... We firmly dissociate ourselves, an unacceptable document, a wound still open for the entire country." Emanuele Filiberto told TG5 that he was writing with "an open heart" a difficult letter whose contents "may surprise you and that perhaps you did not expect", and the time had come "once and for all" to "come to terms with the history and the past" of the Savoy family.

Some of the activities, actions, and accusations of members of the House of Savoy, especially those of Vittorio Emanuele and his legal troubles, evoked media coverage disappointing to Italian royalists, including among its family members. Vittorio Emanuele was a business intermediary on behalf of Agusta and thanks to his friendship with Mohammad Reza Pahlavi concluded sales of helicopters between Italy, Iran, and some Arab countries. In the 1970s, he was investigated in Venice and Trento for international arms trafficking to some Middle Eastern countries under embargo. This case was later transferred to Rome but was later closed. Most notably, in November 1991, after thirteen years of legal proceedings, the Paris Assize Court acquitted Vittorio Emanuele of the fatal wounding and unintentional homicide in August 1978 of Dirk Hamer (who was shot and killed while asleep on a yacht off Cavallo), finding him guilty of unauthorised possession of a firearm during the incident; this proved to be his one and only conviction of all his legal troubles.

On 16 June 2006, Vittorio Emanuele was arrested in Varenna, as investigators said he had contacts with the Mafia, and imprisoned in Potenza on charges of political corruption and recruitment of prostitutes for clients of the Casinò di Campione of Campione d'Italia, from which it emerged the Vallettopoli scandal. After seven days in jail, Vittorio Emanuele was released and placed under house arrest instead; both Vittorio Emanuele and his family denied any wrongdoings. He was released from house arrest on 20 July but was required to remain within the territory of the Italian Republic; he was eventually acquitted of all charges, including that of criminal association aimed at corruption, gambling, forgery ("against public administration, public faith, and property"), exploitation of prostitution, and aiding and abetting, in the Savoiagate trial, and in February 2015 obtained €40,000 in damages for his time in jail.

When incarcerated in June 2006, Vittorio Emanuele was recorded admitting, with regard to the killing of Hamer, that "I was in the wrong, but I put one over on those French judges", leading to a call from Hamer's sister Birgit for Vittorio Emanuele to be retried in Italy for the killing; in response to this and his father's arrest and charges in 2006, Emanuele Filiberto distanced himself from Vittorio Emanuele, saying that he does not share or support everything his father did, while Amedeo of Savoy stated that Vittorio Emanuele's claims to the Headship of House Savoy were "in presence of facts that can injure the Royal House". After a long legal fight, Birgit Hamer obtained the full video. The story was broken in the press by Il Fatto Quotidiano with an article by aristocratic journalist Beatrice Borromeo, who also wrote the preface for a book on the murder Delitto senza castigo by Birgit Hamer. Vittorio Emanuele sued the newspaper for defamation, claiming the video had been manipulated. In March 2015, a court judgement ruled in favour of Il Fatto Quotidiano. In August 2017, Italy's Supreme Court of Cassation acquitted La Repubblica journalists Maurizio Crosetti and Ezio Mauro of a defamation lawsuit brought by Vittorio Emanuele, who had been referred to by Crosetti and Mauro as "the one who used" with ease the rifle at Cavallo, "killing a man". Crosetti and Mauro, who was also sued for omitted control due to being the then editor-in-chief, had been convicted in the first-instance trial but were acquitted on appeal, a sentence that the Supreme Court of Cassation confirmed. In the summer of 2023, The Prince, a docuseries directed by Borromeo and focused on the death of Hamer, was released on Netflix. The docuseries concluded with Vittorio Emanuele declaring that he had no regrets and that he would do everything he had done in his life again "except Cavallu", referencing the events at Cavallo.

In late 2007, lawyers representing Vittorio Emanuele and his son Emanuele Filiberto wrote a seven-page letter to then Italian president Giorgio Napolitano and Italian prime minister Romano Prodi seeking damages for their years in exile (€260 million without considering interest) and the return of their seized property after the war. This was confirmed during an interview on the Rai 3 popular affairs programme Ballarò, where Emanuele Filiberto also stated that the seized property including Roman landmarks, such as the Quirinale palace and Villa Ada, should be returned to the Savoy family. The Italian prime minister's office released a statement stating that the Savoys are not owed any damages and suggesting that Italy may demand damages from the Savoys for their collusion with Mussolini and its wartime conduct. The Italian Constitution contains a clause stripping the Savoys of their wealth on exile. Emanuele Filiberto acknowledged that his fiancée, whose pregnancy was revealed at the time of the couple's engagement, belonged to a more leftist milieu than his own, a fact that initially displeased his father. On 17 December 2017, the body of Victor Emmanuel III returned to Italy to be buried at the Sanctuary of Vicoforte in Piedmont.

Judicially separated since 1976, civilly divorced in 1982, and their marriage religiously annulled in 1987, Amedeo of Aosta's first wife, Princess Claude of Orléans, revealed that she was aware that her husband fathered a child by another woman during their marriage. Aosta acknowledged paternity of another child, born out-of-wedlock in 2006 during his second marriage but agreed to contribute financially to the child's care only after being directed to do so by court order. The patrilineal lineage of the House of Savoy was reduced to four males between 1996 and 2009. In 2008, Aimone of Savoy-Aosta married Princess Olga Isabelle of Greece, his second cousin, and they became the parents of sons Umberto and Amedeo, who were born respectively in 2009 and 2011. In 2019, Vittorio Emanuele issued a formal decree that modified the medieval law restricting succession to male heirs to place his granddaughter, Vittoria Cristina Chiara Adelaide Marie, in the line of succession. Prince Aimone declared the change illegitimate, meaning the title would remain in male succession and transfer to the Savoy-Aosta branch led by Aimone. As of 2022, the House of Savoy was in the process of trying to reclaim family jewels that have been owned by the Italian government since the abolition of the monarchy. Vittorio Emanuele died in February 2024, and the House of Savoy announced: "Surrounded by his family, he died peacefully in Geneva."

== Orders of knighthood ==
The House of Savoy has held two dynastic orders since 1362, which were brought into the Kingdom of Italy as national orders. Although the kingdom ceased to exist in 1946, King Umberto II did not abdicate his role as fons honorum over the two dynastic orders over which the family has long held sovereignty and grand mastership. In the 21st century, following the dispute, both Prince Emanuele Filiberto and Prince Aimone claim to be hereditary Sovereign and Grand Master of the following orders of the House of Savoy:

- Supreme Order of the Most Holy Annunciation, founded in 1362.
- Order of Saints Maurice and Lazarus, founded in 1572.

In addition to these, Vittorio Emanuele claims sovereignty over two more orders:

- Civil Order of Savoy, founded in 1831.
- Order of the Crown of Italy, founded in 1868 and no longer bestowed; it was replaced by the Order of Merit of Savoy in 1988.

In February 2006, all three of Vittorio Emanuele's sisters (Princess Maria Pia, Princess Maria Gabriella, and Princess Maria Beatrice) resigned from the Supreme Order of the Most Holy Annunciation and the Order of Saints Maurice and Lazarus, alleging that memberships in the orders had been sold to unworthy candidates, a newfound practice they could not abide.

== List of rulers ==
=== Counts of Savoy ===
- Humbert I "Biancamano" ("White Hand"), Count 1003–1047/1048 (c. 972/975–1047/48)
  - Amadeus I, Count 1048–1051 (died c. 1052)
  - Otto, Count 1051–1060 (c. 1020–1060)
    - Peter I, Count 1060–1078 (1048/49–1078)
    - Amadeus II, Count 1060–1080 (c. 1046–1080)
      - Humbert II, Count 1080–1103 (c. 1072–1103)
        - Amadeus III, Count 1103–1148 (c. 1095–1148)
          - Humbert III, Count 1148–1189 (1136–1189)
            - Thomas I, Count 1189–1233 (1178–1233)
              - Amadeus IV, Count 1233–1253 (1197–1253)
                - Boniface, Count 1253–1263 (1244–1263)
              - Peter II, Count 1263–1268 (1203–1268)
              - Philip I, Count 1268–1285 (1207–1285)
              - Thomas II, regent 1253–1259 (1199–1259)
                - Amadeus V, Count 1285–1323 (1249–1323)
                  - Edward I, Count 1323–1329 (1284–1329)
                  - Aimone, Count 1329–1343 (1291–1343)
                    - Amadeus VI, Count 1343–1383 (1334–1383)
                      - Amadeus VII, Count 1383–1391 (1360–1391)
                        - Amadeus VIII, Count 1391–1416 (1383–1451)

=== Dukes of Savoy ===
Source: "Savoy 3". Genealogy index.

- Amadeus VIII, Duke of Savoy 1416–1434, Antipope Felix V 1439–1449 (1383–1451), abdicated (from both)
  - Louis I, Duke of Savoy 1434–1465 (1413–1465)
    - Amadeus IX, Duke of Savoy 1465–1472 (1435–1472)
      - Philibert I, Duke of Savoy 1472–1482 (1465–1482)
      - Charles I, Duke of Savoy 1482–1490 (1468–1490)
        - Charles (II) John Amadeus, Duke of Savoy 1490–1496 (1490–1496)
    - Philip II, Duke of Savoy 1496–1497 (1438–1497)
      - Philibert II, Duke of Savoy 1497–1504 (1480–1504)
      - Charles III, Duke of Savoy 1504–1553 (1486–1553)
        - Emmanuel Philibert, Duke of Savoy 1553–1580 (1528–1580)
          - Charles Emmanuel I, Duke of Savoy 1580–1630 (1562–1630)
            - Victor Amadeus I, Duke of Savoy 1630–1637 (1587–1637)
              - Francis Hyacinth, Duke of Savoy 1637–1638 (1632–1638)
              - Charles Emmanuel II, Duke of Savoy 1638–1675 (1634–1675)
                - Victor Amadeus II, Duke of Savoy 1675–1730, later King of Sicily then Sardinia (see below) (1666–1732), abdicated
            - Thomas Francis, 1st Prince of Carignano 1620–1656 (1596–1656), ancestor of all remaining dynasties

=== Kings of Sicily ===
- Victor Amadeus II, King of Sicily 1713–1720 (1666–1732)

=== Kings of Sardinia ===
Sources: "Savoy 4". Genealogy index. "Savoy 5". Genealogy index.

- Charles Emmanuel I, Duke of Savoy 1580–1630 (1562–1630)
  - Victor Amadeus I, Duke of Savoy 1630–1637 (1587–1637)
    - Charles Emmanuel II, Duke of Savoy 1638–1675 (1634–1675)
      - Victor Amadeus II, King of Sardinia 1720–1730 (1666–1732), abdicated
        - Charles Emmanuel III, King of Sardinia 1730–1773 (1701–1773)
          - Victor Amadeus III, King of Sardinia 1773–1796 (1726–1796)
            - Charles Emmanuel IV, King of Sardinia 1796–1802 (1751–1819), abdicated
            - Victor Emmanuel I, King of Sardinia 1802–1821 (1759–1824), abdicated
            - Charles Felix, King of Sardinia 1821–1831 (1765–1831)
  - Thomas Francis, 1st Prince of Carignano 1620–1656 (1596–1656)
    - Emmanuel Philibert, 2nd Prince of Carignano 1656–1709 (1628–1709)
      - Victor Amadeus I, 3rd Prince of Carignano 1709–1741 (1690–1741)
        - Louis Victor, 4th Prince of Carignano 1741–1778 (1721–1778)
          - Victor Amadeus II, 5th Prince of Carignano 1778–1780 (1743–1780)
            - Charles Emmanuel, 6th Prince of Carignano 1780–1800 (1770–1800)
              - Charles Albert, 7th Prince of Carignano 1800–1831, King of Sardinia 1831–1849 (1798–1849), abdicated
                - Victor Emmanuel II, King of Sardinia 1849–1861 (1820–1878)

=== Kings of Italy ===
Sources: "Savoy 6". Genealogy index.

- Victor Emmanuel II, King of Italy 1861–1878 (1820–1878)
  - Umberto I, King of Italy 1878–1900 (1844–1900)
    - Victor Emmanuel III, King of Italy 1900–1946 (1869–1947), abdicated
      - Umberto II, King of Italy 1946 (1904–1983), deposed

=== Emperors of Ethiopia ===
- Victor Emmanuel III, Emperor of Ethiopia (1936–1941), contested by Emperor in exile Haile Selassie I

=== Kings of Albania ===
- Victor Emmanuel III, King of Albania (1939–1943)

=== Kings of Spain ===
- Amadeo I, King of Spain (1870–1873), son of Victor Emmanuel II

=== Kings of Croatia ===
- Tomislav II (Aimone, Duke of Aosta), King of Croatia (1941–1943), grandson of Amedeo I of Spain

=== Cyprus, Jerusalem, and Armenia ===
In 1396, the title and privileges of the final king of the Armenian Kingdom of Cilicia, Levon V, were transferred to James I, his cousin and king of Cyprus. The title of King of Armenia was thus united with the titles of King of Cyprus and King of Jerusalem. The title was held to the modern day by the House of Savoy.

== Family tree ==
Family tree

Male-line, legitimate, non-morganatic members of the house who either lived to adulthood, or who held a title as a child, are included. Heads of the house are in bold.

- **Humbert I, Count of Savoy**, c. 972/975–1047/1048
  - **Amadeus I, Count of Savoy**, died c. 1052
    - Humbert, died before 1052
    - Aymon, Bishop of Belley
  - Aymon, Bishop of Sion, died 1054/1055
  - Burchard (bishop of Aosta), died c. 1068
  - **Otto, Count of Savoy**, c. 1020–1060
    - **Peter I, Count of Savoy**, c. 1048/49–1078
    - **Amadeus II, Count of Savoy**, c. 1050–1080
      - **Humbert II, Count of Savoy**, 1065–1103
        - **Amadeus III, Count of Savoy**, 1095–1148
          - **Humbert III, Count of Savoy**, 1136–1189
            - **Thomas, Count of Savoy**, 1178–1233
              - **Amadeus IV, Count of Savoy**, 1197–1253
                - **Boniface, Count of Savoy**, 1244–1263
              - Thomas, Count of Flanders, 1199–1259
                - Thomas III of Piedmont, 1246–1282
                  - Philip I of Piedmont, 1278–1334
                    - James of Piedmont, 1315–1367
                      - Philip II of Piedmont, died 1368
                      - Amadeus, Prince of Achaea, 1363–1402
                      - Louis of Piedmont, 1364–1418
                    - Amadeus, Bishop of Maurienne, died 1376
                    - Thomas, Bishop of Turin, died 1360
                    - Edward, Archbishop of Tarentaise, died 1395
                    - Aymon, died 1398
                - **Amadeus V, Count of Savoy**, 1252–1323
                  - **Edward, Count of Savoy**, 1284–1329
                  - **Aymon, Count of Savoy**, 1291–1343
                    - **Amadeus VI, Count of Savoy**, 1334–1383
                      - **Amadeus VII, Count of Savoy**, 1360–1391
                        - **Amadeus VIII, Duke of Savoy**, 1383–1451
                          - Amadeus of Savoy, 1412–1431
                          - **Louis, Duke of Savoy**, 1413–1465
                            - **Amadeus IX, Duke of Savoy**, 1435–1472
                              - **Philibert I, Duke of Savoy**, 1465–1482
                              - **Charles I, Duke of Savoy**, 1468–1490
                                - **Charles II, Duke of Savoy**, 1489–1496
                            - Louis of Cyprus, 1436–1482
                            - **Philip II, Duke of Savoy**, 1438–1497
                              - **Philibert II, Duke of Savoy**, 1480–1504
                              - **Charles III, Duke of Savoy**, 1486–1553
                                - **Emmanuel Philibert, Duke of Savoy**, 1528–1580
                                  - **Charles Emmanuel I, Duke of Savoy**, 1562–1630
                                    - Philip Emmanuel, Prince of Piedmont, 1586–1605
                                    - **Victor Amadeus I, Duke of Savoy**, 1587–1637
                                      - **Francis Hyacinth, Duke of Savoy**, 1632–1638
                                      - **Charles Emmanuel II, Duke of Savoy**, 1634–1675
                                        - **Victor Amadeus II**, 1666–1732
                                          - Victor Amadeus, Prince of Piedmont, 1699–1715
                                          - **Charles Emmanuel III**, 1701–1773
                                            - **Victor Amadeus III**, 1726–1796
                                              - **Charles Emmanuel IV**, 1751–1819
                                              - **Victor Emmanuel I**, 1759–1824
                                              - Prince Maurice, Duke of Montferrat, 1762–1799
                                              - **Charles Felix of Sardinia**, 1765–1831
                                              - Prince Joseph, Count of Asti, 1766–1802
                                            - Prince Benedict, Duke of Chablais, 1741–1808
                                    - Emmanuel Philibert of Savoy, 1588–1624
                                    - Prince Maurice of Savoy, 1593–1657
                                    - Thomas Francis, Prince of Carignano, 1596–1656
                                      - Emmanuel Philibert, Prince of Carignano, 1628–1709
                                        - Victor Amadeus I, Prince of Carignano, 1690–1741
                                          - Louis Victor, Prince of Carignano, 1721–1778
                                            - Victor Amadeus II, Prince of Carignano, 1743–1780
                                              - Charles Emmanuel, Prince of Carignano, 1770–1800
                                                - **Charles Albert of Sardinia**, 1798–1849
                                                  - **Victor Emmanuel II**, 1820–1878
                                                    - **Humbert I of Italy**, 1844–1900
                                                      - **Victor Emmanuel III**, 1869–1947
                                                        - **Humbert II of Italy**, 1904–1983
                                                          - **Victor Emmanuel, Prince of Naples**, 1937–2024
                                                            - **Emmanuel Philibert of Savoy, Prince of Venice**, born 1972
                                                    - Amadeus I of Spain, 1845–1890
                                                      - Prince Emmanuel Philibert, Duke of Aosta, 1869–1931
                                                        - Prince Amadeus, Duke of Aosta, 1898–1942
                                                        - Prince Aymon, Duke of Aosta, 1900–1948
                                                          - Prince Amadeus, Duke of Aosta, 1943–2021
                                                            - Aymon of Savoy-Aosta, born 1967
                                                              - Prince Humbert of Savoy-Aosta, born 2009
                                                              - Prince Amadeus Michael of Savoy-Aosta, born 2011
                                                              - Prince Isabella of Savoy-Aosta, born 2012
                                                      - Prince Victor Emmanuel, Count of Turin, 1870–1946
                                                      - Prince Louis Amadeus, Duke of the Abruzzi, 1873–1933
                                                      - Prince Humbert, Count of Salemi, 1889–1918
                                                    - Prince Oddone, Duke of Montferrat, 1846–1866
                                                  - Prince Ferdinand, Duke of Genoa, 1822–1855
                                                    - Prince Thomas, Duke of Genoa, 1854–1931
                                                      - Prince Ferdinand, Duke of Genoa, 1884–1963
                                                      - Prince Philibert, Duke of Genoa, 1895–1990
                                                      - Prince Adalbert, Duke of Bergamo, 1898–1982
                                                      - Prince Eugene, Duke of Genoa, 1906–1996
                                            - Eugene, Count of Villafranca, 1753–1785
                                        - Thomas Philip Gaston of Savoy, 1692–1715
                                      - Prince Joseph Emmanuel of Savoy, Count of Soissons, 1631–1656
                                      - Eugene Maurice, Count of Soissons, 1635–1673
                                        - Louis Thomas, Count of Soissons, 1657–1702
                                          - Thomas Emmanuel, Prince of Savoy-Carignan, 1687–1729
                                            - Eugene John, Count of Soissons, 1714–1734
                                          - Prince Maurice of Savoy, 1690–1710
                                          - Prince Eugene of Savoy, 1692–1712
                                        - Philip, Abbot of Soissons, 1659–1693
                                        - Louis Jules, Knight of Savoy, 1660–1683
                                        - Prince Eugene of Savoy, 1663–1736
                              - Philip, Duke of Nemours, 1490–1533
                                - James of Savoy, Duke of Nemours, 1531–1585
                                  - Charles Emmanuel of Savoy, Duke of Nemours, 1567–1595
                                  - Henry I, Duke of Nemours, 1572–1632
                                    - Louis I, Duke of Nemours, 1615–1641
                                    - Charles Amadeus, Duke of Nemours, 1624–1652
                                    - Henry II, Duke of Nemours, 1625–1659
                            - Peter, Archbishop of Tarentasia, 1440–1458
                            - Janus, Count of Faucigny and Geneva, 1440–1491
                            - John Louis, Bishop of Geneva, 1447–1482
                            - Jacques of Savoy, Count of Romont, 1450–1486
                            - Francis, Archbishop of Auch, 1454–1490
                          - Philip of Savoy, Count of Geneva, 1417–1444
                - Louis I of Vaud, 1250–1302
                  - Louis II of Vaud, c. 1290–1348
              - Aymon, Lord of Chablais, died 1237
              - William of Savoy, died 1239
              - Amadeus, Bishop of Maurienne
              - **Peter II, Count of Savoy**, 1203–1268
              - **Philip I, Count of Savoy**, 1207–1285
              - Boniface of Savoy (bishop), 1207–1270
          - John
          - Peter
          - William
        - William, Bishop of Liège
        - Umberto
        - Reginald
        - Guy, abbot of Namur
    - Otto

== Titles of the Crown of Sardinia ==
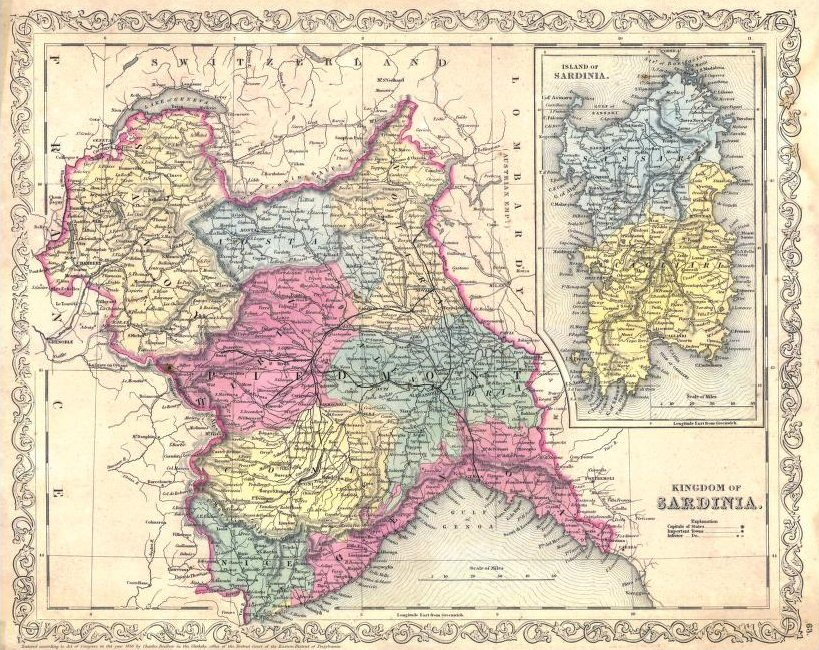
A map of the Kingdom of Sardinia

The titles of the Crown of Sardinia were the following: "VITTORIO AMEDEO III, per la grazia di Dio Re di Sardegna, Cipro, Gerusalemme e Armenia; Duca di Savoia, Monferrato, Chablais, Aosta e Genevese; Principe di Piemonte ed Oneglia; Marchese in Italia, di Saluzzo, Susa, Ivrea, Ceva, Maro, Oristano, Sezana; Conte di Moriana, Nizza, Tenda, Asti, Alessandria, Goceano; Barone di Vaud e di Faucigny; Signore di Vercelli, Pinerolo, Tarantasia, Lumellino, Val di Sesia; Principe e Vicario perpetuo del Sacro Romano Impero in Italia." The English translation is: "Victor Amadeus III, by the Grace of God, King of Sardinia, Cyprus, Jerusalem, Armenia, Duke of Savoy, Montferrat, Chablais, Aosta, and Genevois, Prince of Piedmont and Oneglia, Marquis (of the Holy Roman Empire) in Italy, of Saluzzo, Susa, Ivrea, Ceva, Maro, Oristano, Sezana, Count of Maurienne, Nice, Tende, Asti, Alessandria, Goceano, Baron of Vaud and Faucigny, Lord of Vercelli, Pinerolo, Tarentaise, Lumellino, Val di Sesia, [and] Prince and perpetual Vicar of the Holy Roman Empire in Italy."

== Titles of the Crown of Italy ==
Up until the dissolution of the monarchy in 1946, the full titles of the Kings of the Kingdom of Italy (1861–1946) were:

[Name], by the Grace of God and the will of the Nation, King of Italy, Emperor of Ethiopia, King of Sardinia, Cyprus, Jerusalem, Armenia, King of Albania, Duke of Savoy, count of Maurienne, Marquis (of the Holy Roman Empire) in Italy; Prince of Piedmont, Carignano, Oneglia, Poirino, Trino; Prince and Perpetual Vicar of the Holy Roman Empire; Prince of Carmagnola, Montmélian with Arbin and Francin, Prince bailiff of the Duchy of Aosta, Prince of Chieri, Dronero, Crescentino, Riva di Chieri and Banna, Busca, Bene, Bra, Duke of Genoa, Monferrat, Aosta, Duke of Chablais, Genevois, Duke of Piacenza, Marquis of Saluzzo (Saluces), Ivrea, Susa, of Maro, Oristano, Cesana, Savona, Tarantasia, Borgomanero and Cureggio, Caselle, Rivoli, Pianezza, Govone, Salussola, Racconigi over Tegerone, Migliabruna and Motturone, Cavallermaggiore, Marene, Modane and Lanslebourg, Livorno Ferraris, Santhià, Agliè, Centallo and Demonte, Desana, Ghemme, Vigone, Count of Barge, Villafranca, Ginevra, Nizza, Tenda, Romont, Asti, Alessandria, of Goceano, Novara, Tortona, Bobbio, Soissons, Sant'Antioco, Pollenzo, Roccabruna, Tricerro, Bairo, Ozegna, delle Apertole, Baron of Vaud and of Faucigni, Lord of Vercelli, Pinerolo, of Lomellina, of Valle Sesia, of the Marquisate of Ceva, Overlord of Monaco, Roccabruna and eleven-twelfths of Menton, Noble Patrician of Venice, Patrician of Ferrara.

== See also ==
- Château des ducs de Savoie
- History of Savoy
- History of Savoy from 1815 to 1860
- History of Savoy from 1860 to 1914
- House of Savoy-Carignano
- List of consorts of Savoy
- List of Italian queens
- List of rulers of Savoy
- List of Sardinian consorts
