= Humbert I of Savoy =

Founder of the House of Savoy (c. 980–1047)

Humbert I

Count of Savoy
- Successor: Amadeus I
- Born: c. 980
- Died: 1047/1048; Hermillon, County of Savoy, Holy Roman Empire
- Buried: Saint-Jean-de-Maurienne Cathedral
- Noble family: Savoy (founder)
- Spouse: Ancilla
- Issue: Amadeus I Aymon; Burchard; Otto
- Father: Amadeus, Count of Belley

Humbert I (Italian: Umberto I; c. 980 – 1047), better known as Humbert the White-Handed (French: Humbert aux blanches-mains) or Humbert Whitehand (Italian: Umberto Biancamano), (Note: The title was held to signify his generosity, but may have been a posthumous confusion of a late-medieval record which referred to the walls of his castle (in Latin) as blancis moenibus.) was the count of Savoy from 1032 until his death and the founder of the House of Savoy.

Of obscure origins, his service to the Holy Roman Emperors Henry II and Conrad II was rewarded with the counties of Maurienne and Aosta and lands in Valais, all at the expense of local bishops and archbishops; the territory came to be known as the county of Savoy.

== Biography ==
=== Family ===
Humbert was the son of Amadeus, who may or may not have preceded him as count of Maurienne. His brother was Bishop Otto of Belley. Humbert is the progenitor of the dynasty known as the House of Savoy. The origins of this dynasty are unknown, but Humbert's ancestors are variously said to have come from Saxony, Burgundy or Provence. Given Humbert's close connections with Rudolf III of Burgundy, it is likely that his family was Burgundian, and was descended either from the dukes of Vienne, or from a Burgundian aristocratic family (such as the Guigonids, ancestors of the counts of Albon). It is also likely that Humbert was related to Ermengarde of Burgundy, second wife of Rudolf III.

Humbert initially held lands around Belley and in the county of Sermorens, before gaining lands in Aosta and Valais.

=== Humbert and the empire ===
After Rudolf III's death (1032), Humbert I swore fealty to Emperor Conrad II. He supported Conrad II in his campaigns against Odo II, Count of Blois, and Aribert, Archbishop of Milan. In return, Conrad II appointed Humbert count of Savoy and granted him Maurienne, Chablais and perhaps Tarentaise. These imperial grants to a loyal supporter secured key passes through the Alps, controlling trade between Italy and Western Europe, which would be the core of Savoy power for centuries.

=== Marriage and children ===
Humbert married Ancelie (Auxilia or Ancilia). She may have been Ancilla of Aoste, the daughter of vir illustris Anselme of Aoste or Ancilla of Lenzburg, the daughter of the master of ceremonies of Burgundy. Alternatively, Ancilla may have been a daughter of Anselm and Aldiud, and thus a member of a northern Italian dynasty known as the Anselmids. With his wife, Humbert had at least four sons:

1. Amadeus I (died 1056), Count of Savoy, successor
2. Aymon (died 1054 or 1055), Bishop of Sion
3. Burchard (died 1068 or 1069), Archbishop of Lyon
4. Otto (died c. 1057), Count of Savoy, successor of his brother

Some authors believe that he had additional sons.

=== Death ===
Humbert is often said to have died c. 1047/8 at Hermillon, a town in the Maurienne region of present-day Savoie, France. In the 21st century, it has been suggested that he died by 1042.

== Notes ==
Humbert the White-Handed House of Savoy Born: c. 980 Died: 1047 or 1048
Regnal titles
New title	Count of Savoy; 1032–1047/1048	Succeeded by Amadeus I
