= Burchard (bishop of Aosta) =

Bishop of Aosta, archibishop of Lyon

Burchard or Bouchard or Buckard or Burchard Aosta (died after 10 July 1068), was Bishop of Aosta (1025–1032) and Archbishop of Lyon (1033–1034), under the name of Burchard III, and finally prior of the territorial abbey of Saint Maurice. Burchard was a son of Humbert I, Count of Savoy and Aosta and his wife Auxilia, who may have originated from Aosta and who would have been the sister of Anselm of Aosta, bishop from 994–1025.

Burchard was jointly involved with his father in the governance of the Aosta Valley from April 8, 1022, perhaps as coadjutor beforehand to ensure the succession of his maternal uncle as bishop of Aosta in 1025. He was mentioned as bishop of Aosta on October 19, 1024 in a deed of gift alongside his father Humbert. On 10 March 1026 Buchard was transferred to the archbishopric of Lyon, which proves the assertion of regional power by his family. According to the chronicler Raoul Glaber, who specifies that he was the nephew of his predecessor, Burchard II of Lyons in the seat of Lyon, he takes the side, with Gerold Geneva Odo II, in the succession dispute King, who opposed his uncle, the Emperor Holy Roman Emperor Conrad II, called the Salic, Duke of Franconia. They were defeated in 1034 by his father, Humbert, who led an army of the Emperor. He was captured and driven from Lyon by imperial troops. Released in 1039 by Henry III on condition that he withdraw into territory of Saint Maurice Abbey, he became "Agannensis abbatia Abbas', where he is mentioned for the last time in an act of July 10, 1068, although the necrology of the primatial St. John Lyon lists his death as occurring on June 10, 1046.
