= Orbassano =

Orbassano Orbassan (Piedmontese)
- Comune
- Comune di Orbassano
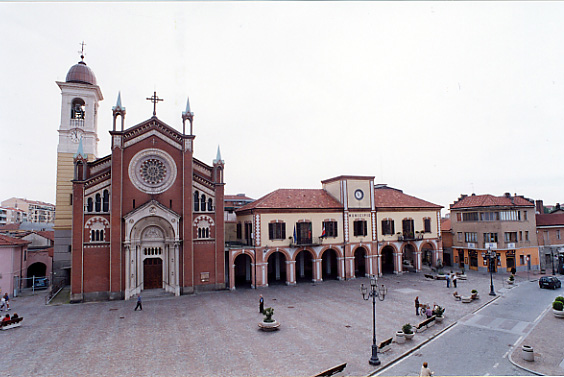

- Coat of arms

- Location within Italy Location within Piedmont
- Coordinates: 45°0′N 7°32′E
- Country: Italy
- Region: Piedmont
- Metropolitan city: Turin (TO)
- Frazioni: Tetti Valfrè, Gonzole

Government
  - Mayor: Cinzia Maria Bosso

Area
  - Total: 22.21 km^{2} (8.58 sq mi)
- Elevation: 273 m (896 ft)

Population (31 December 2017)
  - Total: 23,365
  - Density: 1,052/km^{2} (2,725/sq mi)
- Demonym: Orbassanese (pl. -i)
- Time zone: UTC+1 (CET)
  - Summer (DST): UTC+2 (CEST)
- Postal code: 10043
- Dialing code: 011
- Patron saint: St. John the Baptist
- Saint day: 24 June
- Website: Official website

Orbassano (Italian: [orbasˈsaːno]; Piedmontese: Orbassan [ʊrbaˈsɑŋ]) is a comune (municipality) in the Metropolitan City of Turin in the Italian region Piedmont, located about 13 kilometres (8 miles) southwest of Turin.

Orbassano borders the following municipalities: Turin, Rivoli, Rivalta di Torino, Beinasco, Nichelino, Volvera, Candiolo, None.

== History ==
The known origins of the city date back to the Roman conquest of Cisalpine Gaul, evidenced by two Imperial era tombstones found here in the second half of the nineteenth century.

By the end of the first millennium, Orbassano was among the lands of the Margrave of Susa, but in 1029 it found itself sold by Manfredi to the new Abbey of San Giusto in Susa. Shortly thereafter, in 1035, some of the land came into the possession of the Diocese of Turin. In the twelfth century Orbassano came under the control of its northern neighbours the Lords of Rivalta, the Orsini family.

== People ==
Sonia Gandhi was raised here, although she was born in Lusiana, near Vicenza.

== Sport ==
Orbassano Calcio is the town's football club.

== Twin towns ==
Orbassano is twinned with:

- Ełk, Poland (since 2010)
