= Arduinici =

The Arduinici were a noble Frankish family that immigrated to Italy in the early tenth century, possibly from Neustria. They were descended from and take their name after one Arduin (Hardouin).

== History ==
The first of the Arduinici to enter Italy was Roger, son of Arduin, who was established as count (comes) at Auriate in the early tenth century. He extended his power and was succeeded by his son Arduin Glaber, named after his grandfather, who established the family as one of the most powerful in northwestern Italy. He conquered the Susa Valley and allied with Provence against the Muslim Andalusian outpost of Fraxinetum. He ruled the counties of Auriate, Turin, Asti, Albenga and probably Bredulo, Alba, and Ventimiglia. During a reorganisation of the structure of Italy's marches under Berengar II in 950, Arduin's territories were organised as the March of Turin, or marca Arduinica.

Arduin allied his family with the House of Canossa by marrying his heir, Manfred I to Prangarda, daughter of Adalbert Atto of Canossa. The family later drew itself close to the Holy Roman Empire. Arduin's grandson, Ulric Manfred (Odalrich-Maginfred), was one of the most powerful noblemen Italy in the 1020s, when he tried to play kingmaker and give the throne to William V of Aquitaine. Ulric Manfred's daughters, Adelaide and Irmgard, married high-ranking German princes: Hermann IV of Swabia and Otto III of Swabia, respectively. Irmgard later married Egbert I, Margrave of Meissen, one of the richest magnates in Germany, and Adelaide, through her marriage to Otto of Savoy, was the mother of Bertha, empress of Henry IV and of another Adelaide, who married the German anti-king Rudolf of Rheinfelden. Adelaide (died 1091) was the last scion of the house; her heirs were her sons Peter I and Amadeus II of Savoy.
