= Agnes of Aquitaine, Countess of Savoy =

Agnes

Countess of Savoy
- Tenure: 1064–1078
- Born: c.1052
- Died: after 18 June 1089
- Spouse: Peter I, Count of Savoy
- Issue: Agnes, Margravine of Susa; Alix, Margravine of Western Liguria ? Bertha, Queen of Aragon
- House: House of Poitiers
- Father: ? William VII, Duke of Aquitaine
- Mother: ? Ermensinda

Agnes of Aquitaine (c.1052 – after 18 June 1089) was a Countess consort of Savoy and possibly Queen consort of Aragon. She was a daughter of William of Poitou, speculated to be William VII, Duke of Aquitaine, whose wife Ermesinde would then have been her mother.

== Life ==
=== Possible wife of Ramiro I of Aragon ===
Agnes became a popular name in the House of Poitiers following the marriage of William V, Duke of Aquitaine to Agnes of Burgundy. Three Aquitainian women sharing the name Agnes are known to have married Iberian monarchs, and a fourth Iberian consort also named Agnes has been speculated to have been Aquitainian.

Ramiro I of Aragon married a second wife named Agnes, who based on the name is believed to be of Aquitainian origins. The woman's parentage is disputed; she may have been daughter of William VI, Duke of Aquitaine or his half-brother William VII, Duke of Aquitaine. It is believed by some that Duke William VI died childless. Likewise, unlike William VII, he was only step-son of Agnes of Burgundy, Duchess of Aquitaine, and hence less likely to name a daughter for her. On the other hand, any child of Duke William VII would have been no older than about six years old at the time of Ramiro's marriage, which could explain the lack of children born to Ramiro and his second wife.

Ramiro I died on 8 May 1063 leaving as widow this wife who is not again seen in Aragon. Since this was the year before Agnes, proposed as daughter of William VII, married Peter of Savoy, it allows them to have been the same person, though no direct evidence attests to this.

=== Countess of Savoy ===
In 1064, Agnes married Peter I, Count of Savoy. Three children are assigned to Peter and Agnes:

- Agnes (c. 1066 – after 13 March 1110) married Frederick of Montbéliard and had issue
- Alix (died after 21 December 1099) married Boniface del Vasto and had issue.
- (hypothesized) Bertha (c. 1075 – before 1111) married Peter I of Aragon, a grandson of Ramiro I. The prior marriage of Agnes would have provided the political context for this marriage. Bertha had no known issue.

Peter died on July 9, 1078, leaving Agnes a widow. A charter confirms that Agnes, widow of Count Peter was still alive in June 1089.

Preceded by Adelaide of Susa	Countess of Savoy; 1064–1078	Succeeded by Joan of Geneva
