= Alric of Asti =

Lombard bishop

Alric (d. December 1036), also known as Alrico, Adalric, and Odelric, was a medieval Lombard bishop of Asti in Italy from 1007 or 1008 until his death.

Alric was a member of the Arduinici dynasty, the son of Manfred, marquis of Susa, and his wife Prangarda. His brother Ulric Manfred succeeded to his father's titles. With Ulric's help, Emperor Henry II invested Alric as bishop of Asti in 1007 or 1008 in opposition to Peter, who had supported Arduin's claims against the emperor. Alric was confirmed as bishop by Pope John XVIII, without the approval of Arnulf II, archbishop of Milan. To appease Arnulf, Ulric and Alric were required to walk barefoot carrying (respectively) a dog and a bible to the Basilica of Sant'Ambrogio in Milan before humbling themselves before Arnulf. Alric made many donations to monasteries and other religious institutions, both on his own and with his brother and Ulric's wife, Bertha of Milan.

Alric was a loyal supporter of the next archbishop of Milan, Aribert. Around 1028, Alric, along with his brother Ulric, Archbishop Aribert and Bishop Landulf of Turin acted to suppress a heretical movement which had developed at Monforte.

Alric died in the battle of Campomalo (near Pavia) in December 1036, fighting against vassals who had rebelled against Archbishop Aribert.
