= Immilla of Turin =

Daughter of Ulric Manfred II of Turin (c.1020–1078)

- Born: c. 1020; Turin
- Died: 10 January 1078; Turin
- Noble family: Arduinici
- Spouses: Otto of Schweinfurt (m. 1036, d. 1057); Eckbert I of Meissen (m. 1058, d. 1068)
- Issue: Bertha; Gisela; Judith; Eilika; Beatrice; Eckbert II; Gertrude
- Father: Ulric Manfred II of Turin
- Mother: Bertha of Milan

Immilla (also Emilia, Immula, Ermengard, or Irmgard) (c. 1020 – January 1078) was a duchess consort of Swabia by marriage to Otto III, Duke of Swabia, and a margravine of Meissen by marriage to Ekbert I of Meissen. She was regent of Meissen during the minority of her son, Ekbert II.

== Life ==
Immilla was the daughter of Ulric Manfred II of Turin and Bertha of Milan and thereby a member of the Arduinici dynasty. Her older sister was Adelaide of Susa.

Her first husband was Otto III, Duke of Swabia, whom she married c. 1036. After Otto's death in September 1057, Immilla married again (c. 1058). Her second husband was Ekbert I of Meissen.

In 1067, shortly before his death, Ekbert I attempted to repudiate Immilla in order to marry Adela of Louvain, daughter of Lambert II, Count of Louvain and the widow of Otto I, Margrave of Meissen. After Ekbert's death in 1068, Immilla spent some time at the imperial court with her niece Bertha of Savoy, before returning to Italy. It is possible that she acted as regent for her young son, Ekbert II, at this time.

Immilla died in Turin on 10 January 1078. She is sometimes said to have become a nun before her death.

== Marriages and children ==
With her first husband, Otto, Immilla had five daughters:

- Bertha (or Alberada) (died 1 April 1103), married firstly Herman II, Count of Kastl, and married secondly Frederick, Count of Kastl
- Gisela, inherited Kulmbach and Plassenburg, married Arnold IV, Count of Andechs
- Judith (died 1104), married firstly Conrad I, Duke of Bavaria, and secondly Botho, Count of Pottenstein
- Eilika, abbess of Niedermünster
- Beatrice (1040–1140), inherited Schweinfurt, married Henry II, Count of Hildrizhausen and Margrave of the Nordgau

With her second husband, Ekbert I, Immilla had the following children:

- Ekbert II
- Gertrude, married firstly Dietrich II, Count of Katlenburg, secondly Henry, Margrave of Frisia and thirdly Henry I, Margrave of the Saxon Ostmark

== Notes ==
Immilla of Turin House of Savoy Born: c. 1020 Died: January 1078
Regnal titles
Preceded by Unknown daughter of Hugh IV of Egisheim	Duchess of Swabia; 1048–1057	Succeeded by Matilda of Swabia
Preceded by Adela of Louvain	Margravine of Meissen; 1067–1068	Succeeded by Oda of Weimar
