= Manfred I of Turin =

Manfred I or Maginfred (died c. 1000) was the second Arduinici marquis of Susa from 977 until his death.

Manfred was the eldest son of Arduin Glaber, from whom he inherited the county of Auriate and the vast March of Susa. The march extended from the Susa Valley by the Alps south across the Po to the Ligurian Sea. Although he ruled for almost twenty-five years, there is little evidence of his activities in surviving sources. Under him, Pavia became a mercantile city. He also controlled the road between Genoa and Marseille.

Manfred married Prangarda, daughter of Adalbert Atto of Canossa, probably after 962. With Prangarda Manfred had several children, including:

- Ulric Manfred
- Alric
- Otto
- Atto
- Hugo
- Wido

Gundulph, father of St Anselm, may have been one of his sons or grandsons.

Preceded by Arduin Glaber	Margrave of Turin c. 977–1000	Succeeded by Ulric Manfred II
