= Bertha of Milan =

Italian noblewoman (c. 997 – c. 1040)

Bertha of Milan or Bertha of Luni (c. 997 – c. 1040) was a countess margravine of Turin by marriage to Ulric Manfred II of Turin, and regent in Turin and Susa for her daughter Adelaide of Susa in 1033.

She is sometimes identified with the Bertha who was married to Arduin of Ivrea.

== Life ==
Although it is known that Bertha was a member of the Obertenghi dynasty, there is some debate about who her parents were. Her father is often said to be Oberto II, but others argue that Bertha's father was in fact Otbert III of Milan.

By 1014 at the latest, Bertha had married Ulric Manfred (that year, Emperor Henry II confirmed their joint donation to the abbey of Fruttuaria). Her dowry included lands in the counties of Tortona, Parma and Piacenza.

In May 1028 with her husband, Ulric Manfred, Bertha founded the convent of Santa Maria at Caramagna. The following year, in July 1029, along with her husband and his brother, Bishop Alric of Asti, Bertha founded the Benedictine abbey in of S. Giusto in Susa, which housed the relics of Saint Just (San Giusto), presumed to be a martyred monk from the abbey of Novalesa. The church of the Abbey of San Giusto is now Susa Cathedral.

After Ulric Manfred's death (in December 1033 or 1034), Bertha briefly acted as regent for their daughter, Adelaide of Susa.

In 1037 Bertha captured envoys who wished to cross the Alps from Piedmont to Champagne, thus foiling a conspiracy against Emperor Conrad II. Conrad II rewarded Bertha for her part in suppressing the rebellion against him by issuing an imperial diploma which confirmed her donations to the abbey of San Giusto in Susa.

== Issue ==
With Ulric Manfred, Bertha had three daughters:

- Adelaide
- Immilla
- Bertha
