= Avigliana =

Avigliana Vijan-a (Piedmontese) Velhanna (Arpitan) Veillane (French)
- Comune
- Città di Avigliana
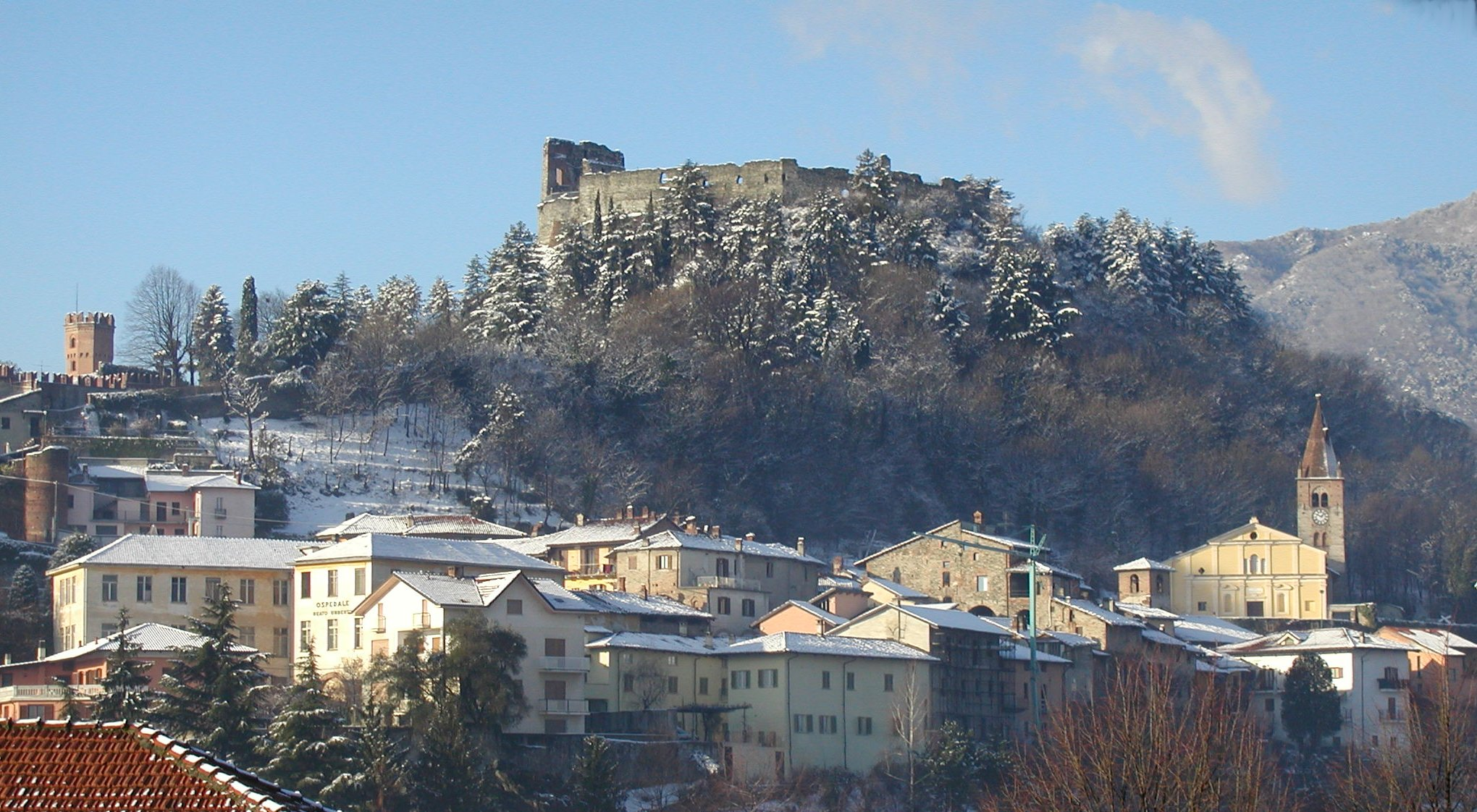

- Coat of arms

- Location within Italy Location within Piedmont
- Coordinates: 45°5′N 7°24′E
- Country: Italy
- Region: Piedmont
- Metropolitan city: Turin (TO)
- Frazioni: Drubiaglio, Milanere, Mortera, Bertassi

Government
  - Mayor: Andrea Archinà

Area
  - Total: 23.22 km^{2} (8.97 sq mi)
- Elevation: 383 m (1,257 ft)

Population (31-12-2021)
  - Total: 12,350
  - Density: 531.9/km^{2} (1,378/sq mi)
- Demonym: Aviglianese(i)
- Time zone: UTC+1 (CET)
  - Summer (DST): UTC+2 (CEST)
- Postal code: 10051
- Dialing code: 011
- ISTAT code: 001013
- Patron saint: St. John the Baptist
- Saint day: 24 June
- Website: Official website

Avigliana (Italian: [aviʎˈʎaːna]; Piedmontese: Vijan-a [viˈjɑŋa]; Arpitan: Velhanna; French: Veillane) is a town and comune (municipality) in the Metropolitan City of Turin in the Piedmont region of Italy, with 12,129 inhabitants as of 1 January 2023. It lies about 25 kilometres (16 mi) west of Turin in the Susa valley, on the motorway going from Turin to Modane, France.

It is best known for two maar lakes, Lago Grande and Lago Piccolo. Also nearby is the massive Sacra di San Michele.

== History ==
In 574, the Lombard King Cleph built a castle here. According to some sources, the battle between the Franks of Pippin the Younger and the Lombards of Aistulf occurred nearby in 750. Later Avigliana depended on the Abbey of Novalesa, and subsequently, it was a possession of the House of Savoy.

Avigliana was captured by Emperor Henry VI in 1187, but later it was acquired by Thomas I of Savoy. In 1536, in the course of the Italian Wars, it was again stormed by French troops. French attacks repeated in 1630 and 1690, the latter ending with the destruction of the castle.

== Main sights ==
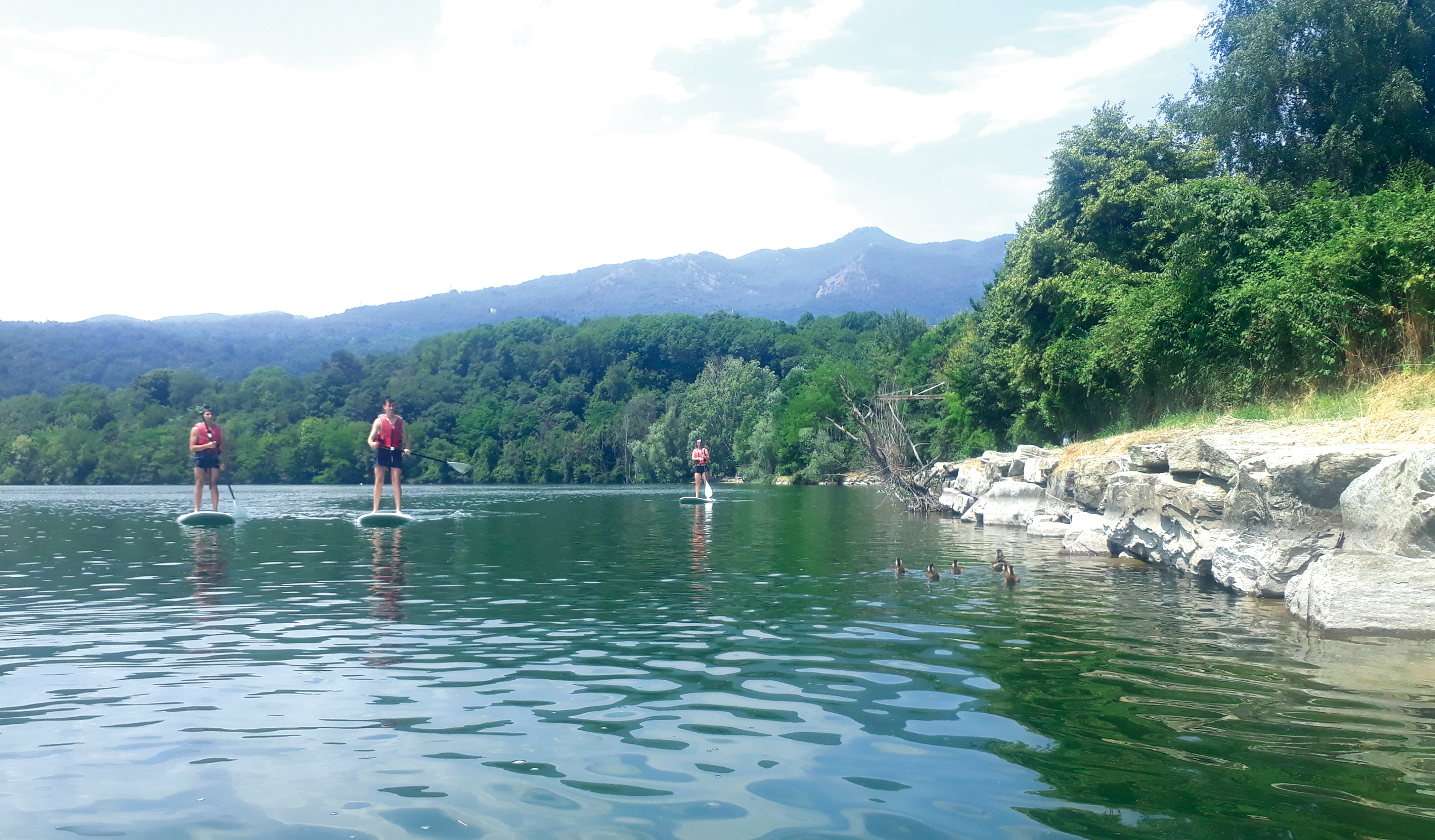
Avigliana Lake with paddleboarders and fledged family (Anas platyrhynchos)

- Ruins of the castle, destroyed in the seventeenth century by the French.
- Church of San Giovanni, with several works by Defendente Ferrari.
- The Romanesque church of San Pietro.
- Natural Park of the Lakes of Avigliana.

== Transportation ==
Avigliana has two exits on the A32 Bardonecchia-Turin motorway. It has also a station on the Turin-Modane railroad.

== Twin towns ==
- Tresserve, France
- Oualia, Mali
- Sevan, Armenia
