= Henry of Montferrat =

Marquis of Montferrat

Henry (c.1020-c.1044/5) was a member of the Aleramid dynasty.

He was a younger son of William III of Montferrat and Waza. From 1042, he was co-ruler of the March of Montferrat with his older brother Otto II of Montferrat.

Probably in 1041, certainly before 19 January 1042, he married Adelaide of Susa, the heiress of the March of Turin, which temporarily united the two great northwestern Italian marches of Turin and Montferrat.

== Notes ==
Henry of Montferrat Aleramici Born: c.1020 Died: c. 1045
Preceded by William III	Marquis of Montferrat c.1042-1045 With: Otto II	Succeeded by Otto II
Preceded by Herman	Marquis of Turin c.1041-1045 With: Adelaide	Succeeded by Otto I
