= Chronicon novaliciense =

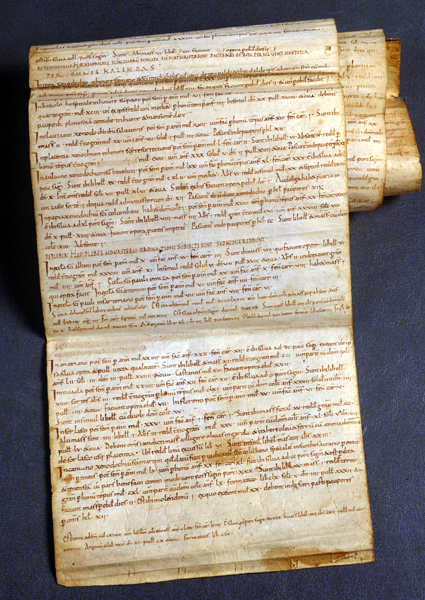

The Chronicon Novaliciense (or Chronicle of Novalesa) is a monastic chronicle which was written in the mid-eleventh century in the valley of Susa.

The Chronicle of Novalesa was written, c.1050, by an anonymous monk at the monastery of San Pietro in Novalesa. The Chronicon was written in the form of a rotulus (or scroll) rather than a codex. The original, and sole extant copy, of the scroll is preserved in Turin (Archivio di Stato, Nuova collezione, "museo"). The scroll consists of twenty-eight pieces of parchment sewn together, of which fragments are now missing. The work is divided into five sections, plus an appendix; of which sections four and five are incomplete.

The Chronicon relates the story of monastery of Novalesa from its foundation, by the patrician Abbo in 726, up to the mid-eleventh century. Its main purpose was to emphasise the connection between the revived eleventh-century community at Novalesa and the earlier community of monks, who had been forced to abandon the monastery in 906 by incursions into the western Alps by Saracens (Muslims from Al-Andalus). When the monks finally returned to Novalesa, in the early eleventh century, they found that their monastery had lost its formerly important status in the region. The anonymous author of the Chronicon blamed Arduin Glaber of Turin for this. The Chronicon accuses Arduin Glaber of taking advantage of the monks’ absence to usurp their lands in the valley of Susa.

The text draws on both oral sources and written ones. In addition to charters (legal documents, recording grants of rights and/or authority), the anonymous author made use of narrative sources including Paul the Deacon's Historia Langobardorum, the Liber Pontificalis, and the Latin heroic epic Waltharius.
