= Herman IV of Swabia =

Herman IV, Duke of Swabia and Margrave of Turin
- Born: c. 1015
- Died: July 1038
- Noble family: House of Babenberg
- Spouse: Adelaide of Susa
- Father: Ernest I, Duke of Swabia
- Mother: Gisela of Swabia

Herman IV (c. 1015 – July 1038) was the Duke of Swabia (1030–1038). He was the second son of Ernest I and Gisela of Swabia. He was one of the Babenberg dukes of Swabia.

Herman became duke in 1030 following the death of his older brother Ernest II. At the time he was still a minor.

Seven years later, his stepfather, the Emperor Conrad II, married him to Adelaide of Susa, the marchioness of Turin, in January 1037. Herman was then invested as margrave of Turin. In July of the next year, while campaigning with Conrad in Southern Italy, he was struck down by an epidemic near Naples. Conrad then transferred rule of the duchy of Swabia to his own son, Henry I, while Adelaide remarried to Henry of Montferrat.

He was buried in Trento Cathedral on 28 July 1038, because the summer heat made it impossible to bring his corpse back to Germany.

Because of a late Austrian source, Herman is sometimes mistakenly said to have had children. This was not the case. Herman was on campaign for much of his short marriage to Adelaide and he died without heirs.

== Sources ==
- Ryley, Caroline M. (1964). "The Emperor Henry III". In Gwatkin, H.W.; Whitney, J.P.; Tanner, J.R.; Previte-Orton, C.W. (eds.). The Cambridge Medieval History:Germany and the Western Empire. Vol. III. Cambridge University Press.
- Wolfram, Herwig (2006). Conrad II, 990-1039: Emperor of Three Kingdoms. Translated by Kaiser, Denise A. The Pennsylvania State University Press.
- 'Hermann IV., Hzg. v. Schwaben,' in: Lexikon des Mittelalters (LexMA), vol. 4 (Munich and Zürich, 1989), cols. 2161–2162.
- D. Schwennicke, Europäische Stammtafeln: Stammtafeln zur Geschichte der Europäischen Staaten (Marburg, 1978).
- S. Hellmann, Die Grafen von Savoyen und das Reich: bis zum Ende der staufischen Periode (Innsbruck, 1900), accessible online (but without page numbers) at: Genealogie Mittelalter

Herman IV of Swabia House of Babenberg Born: c.1015 Died: July 1038
Preceded by Ernest II	Duke of Swabia; 1030–1038	Succeeded by Henry I
Preceded by Ulric Manfred	Margrave of Turin c.1037-1038 With: Adelaide	Succeeded by Henry of Montferrat
