= Arduin Glaber =

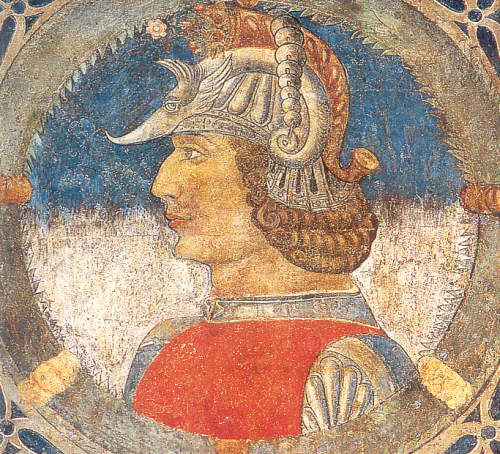

Arduin Glaber (Italian: Arduino Glabrio, Glabrione, or il Glabro 'the Bald'; died c. 977) was count of Auriate from c. 935, count of Turin from c. 941/942, and Margrave of Turin from c. 950/964. He placed his dynasty, the Arduinici, on a firm foundation and established the march of Turin through conquests and royal concessions. The Chronicon Novaliciense, the chronicle of the abbey of Novalesa, is the primary source for his life.

== Biography ==
Arduin was the eldest son of Roger, Count of Auriate (r. c. 906 – c. 935), a Frankish nobleman who immigrated to Italy in the early tenth century. The medieval county of Auriate comprised the region bounded by the Alps, the Po River, and the Stura, today the regions of the Saluzzese and Cuneese. Arduin succeeded his father as count of Auriate sometime around 935, but he is not documented as Count Arduin (Ardoino comes) until 13 April 945, when he sat in judgement at a conference (placitum) of Count Lanfranc at Pavia in the presence of King Lothair II.

=== County of Turin ===
Around 940 Arduin campaigned in the Susa Valley against the Saracens who were occupying Alpine passes. He gained control of the valley and brought Novalesa back under Christian control. He built the first castle at Avigliana as part of his Susa Valley defences. Sometime between 941 and 950, Arduin was made count of Turin. Since King Hugh exiled Berengar of Ivrea and abolished the March of Ivrea, which included Turin, in 941, it is probable that Hugh bestowed the county on Arduin at this time. Turin was the principal residence for Arduin and his dynasty from this point on.

=== Relationship with Berengar of Ivrea ===
After he was exiled, Berengar of Ivrea went to the court of Otto I of Germany, where he was present from January 942. He returned to Italy soon afterwards and strengthened his position. In a diploma issued in Hugh's reign (March/April 945), Berengar is referred to as Hugh's summus consiliarius (highest counsellor). Berengar was particularly dominant during the brief reign of Hugh's son, and successor, Lothair II of Italy, who was married to Adelaide. In June 948, Berengar was described as Lothair's consors regni (partner in the kingdom). After Lothair's death (probably from poison), Berengar became king of Italy (15 December 950). Arduin Glaber was on good terms with Berengar during the period of his political ascendance. On 13 November 950, he was given the administration of the abbey of Novalesa, legally by Lothair, but probably through Berengar.

=== Relationship with Emperor Otto I ===
Arduin also managed to be on good terms with Otto I, who forcibly replaced Berengar as king of Italy. When Otto I invaded Italy, Arduin switched sides during the siege of Canossa and began to support Otto. Many contemporary sources discuss Arduin's role in the siege of Canossa, including Donizo's Vita Mathildis. Arduin later cultivated a marital alliance with Adalbert Atto of Canossa, whose daughter Prangarda married his son and successor, Manfred I. As a reward for his support, Otto I later appointed Arduin count of Asti.

=== Margrave of Turin ===
The march of Turin consisted of the counties of Auriate, Turin, Asti, Albenga, and probably Bredulo, Alba, and Ventimiglia. Arduin is not recorded with the title of marchio (margrave) until 964, so it is possible that it was Otto I who appointed him margrave of Turin. Alternatively, Arduin may have been appointed margrave before this, perhaps during the reorganisation which took place during Lothair's reign, but under Berengar's direction.

=== Campaigns against the Saracens ===
From an early date Arduin was certainly occupied with the Saracens who had occupied the Susa Valley and established a base at Fraxinetum in neighbouring Provence. He may have expelled them from the valley in 940–41. To this, he probably added Albenga, Alba, and Ventimiglia by conquest. He definitely took part in the wars of William I and Rotbold I of Provence against the Saracens of Fraxinetum. According to Liutprand of Cremona in his Antapodosis, in 972 or 973 Arduin and Rotbold led the successful assault on Fraxinetum itself. William meanwhile attacked the abductors of Abbot Maieul of Cluny. According to a later comital document of 1041, he took the cities of Tenda, Briga, and Saorge from them and granted them concessions. Arduin was last recorded alive on 4 April 976. Despite the fact that he repatriated their land from the Saracens, the monks of Novalesa who had fled Saracen incursions in 906 and were still in Turin as late as 929 accused him of disrespecting their rights: Ardoinus vir potens ... nobis tulit [vallem Segusinam] tantum ... erat plenus viciis ... superbia tumidus ... in adquirendis rebus alienis avaricie faucibus succensus.

=== Marriage and children ===
Arduin married a woman named Vmille in the Necrologio Sanctæ Andreæ Taurinensis, probably Emilia or Immula. They had at least five children:

- Alsinda, who married Giselbert II of Bergamo
- Richilda, who married Conrad of Ivrea
- Manfred
- Arduin
- Otto

== Notes ==
Preceded by New creation	Margrave of Turin c. 962 – c. 977	Succeeded by Manfred I
