= William VII of Aquitaine =

11th-century Gascon nobleman

William VII

Duke of Aquitaine
- Reign: 1039–1058
- Predecessor: Odo of Gascony
- Successor: William VIII, Duke of Aquitaine
- Born: Pierre-Guillaume; 1023
- Died: autumn 1058; Saumur
- Spouse: Ermensinde de Longwy
- Issue: Clementia of Aquitaine; Agnes of Aquitaine, Countess of Savoy
- House: Ramnulfids
- Father: William V, Duke of Aquitaine
- Mother: Agnes of Burgundy

William VII (born Peter, Pierre-Guillaume; 1023 – autumn 1058), called the Eagle (Aigret) or the Bold (le Hardi), was duke of Aquitaine and count of Poitou between 1039 and his death, following his half-brother Odo.

== War against his half-brother and failure to occupy Gascony ==
William was the third son of William V of Aquitaine, the eldest by his third wife, Agnes of Burgundy. He was brother-in-law of the Holy Roman Emperor Henry III, who married his sister Agnes. His mother remarried to Geoffrey Martel, Count of Anjou, during his reign. William won his patrimony in a war with his half-brother Odo, who was killed in battle at Mauzé. He did not, however, succeed in occupying Gascony.

== War against his stepfather and death during a siege ==
Geoffrey Martel refused to concede to him the territories gained in the reigns of his predecessors. William set to work regaining his patrimony by force of arms. He was besieging Geoffrey in Saumur when he died of dysentery.

== Marriage and supposed daughters ==
He was married to Ermesinde, of unknown origins. Two daughters have been hypothesized to be children of this couple:

- Clementia, who married Conrad I of Luxembourg
- Agnes, who married Peter I of Savoy.

== Sources ==
- Bachrach, Bernard S. (1993). Fulk Nerra, the Neo-Roman Consul 987-1040. University of California Press.
- Jackman, Donald C. (2012). The Kleeberg Fragment of the Gleiberg County. Editions Enplage.
- Previte-Orton, C.W. (1912). The Early History of the House of Savoy. Cambridge University Press.
- Weinfurter, Stefan (1999). The Salian Century: Main Currents in an Age of Transition. Translated by Bowlus, Barbara M. University of Pennsylvania Press.

== See also ==
- Dukes of Aquitaine family tree

Preceded by Odo	Duke of Aquitaine; 1039–1058	Succeeded by William VIII
Preceded by Odo	Count of Poitiers; 1039–1058	Succeeded by William VIII
