= Frederick of Montbéliard =

Frederick of Montbéliard, Margrave of Turin
- Died: 29 June 1091
- Noble family: House of Bar
- Spouse: Agnes of Savoy
- Father: Louis of Montbéliard
- Mother: Sophie, Countess of Bar

Frederick of Montbéliard or Frederick of Mömpelgard (died 29 June 1091) was from a noble family in Lotharingia. Through marriage, he became the last margrave of Turin (1080–1091).

== Life ==
Frederick was a younger son of Count Louis of Montbéliard (died 1071) and Sophie, Countess of Bar. He is documented in Italy from 1071 onwards as a witness to the charters of Beatrice of Bar and her daughter Matilda of Tuscany, to whom he was related via his mother.

In 1080 Frederick married Agnes of Savoy, daughter of Peter I, Count of Savoy. Agnes was her father’s heir and after marrying Agnes, Frederick was invested with the title of margrave of Turin. He ruled only nominally, as real power remained in the hands of Agnes' grandmother, Adelaide of Susa. Frederick was presumably expected to succeed Adelaide, but he died before her in June 1091.

== Marriage and children ==
With his wife, Agnes of Savoy, Frederick had several children, including:

- Peter
- Bruno
- Siegfried

== Notes ==
Frederick of Montbéliard House of Bar
Preceded by Peter I	Margrave of Turin; 1080–1091; With: Adelaide
