= Bertha of Savoy =

Holy Roman Empress from 1084 to 1087

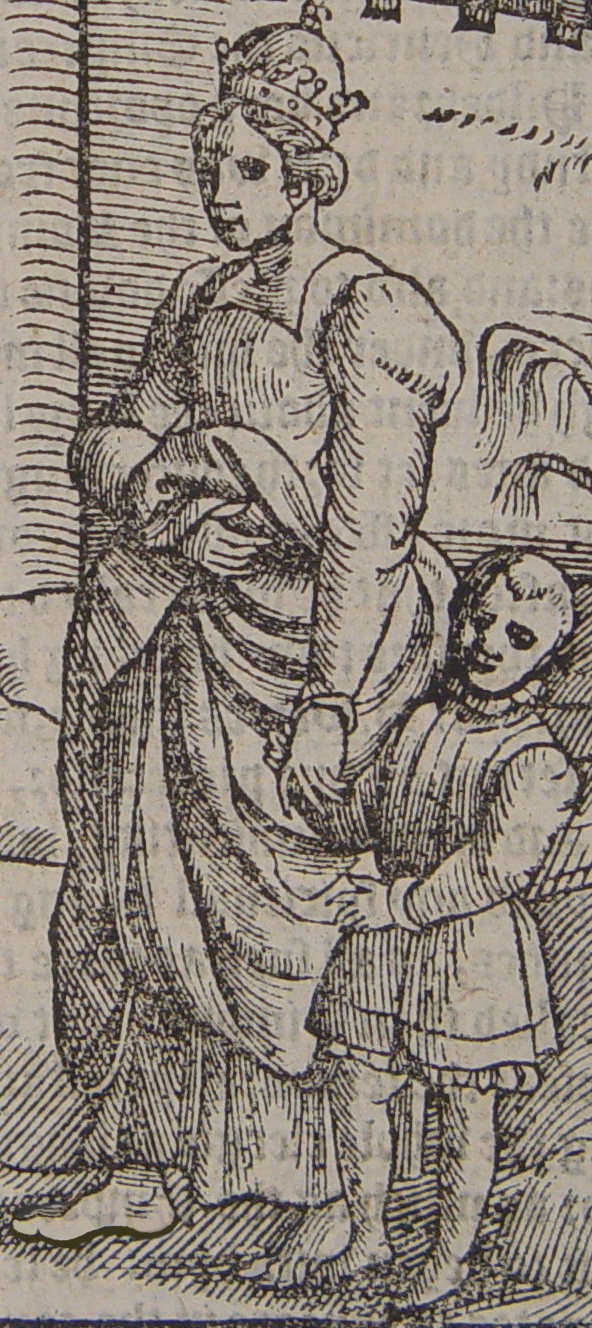

Holy Roman Empress
- Tenure: 1084–1087
- Coronation: 31 March 1084

Queen consort of Germany
- Tenure: 1066–1087
- Coronation: 29 June 1066
- Born: 21 September 1051; March of Turin
- Died: 27 December 1087 (aged 36); Mainz, Rhenish Franconia
- Burial: Speyer Cathedral
- Spouse: Henry IV, Holy Roman Emperor (m. 1066)
- Issue detail: Adelheid; Henry; Agnes, Duchess of Swabia; Conrad II, King of Italy; Henry V, Holy Roman Emperor
- House: Savoy
- Father: Otto, Count of Savoy
- Mother: Adelaide of Susa

Bertha of Savoy (21 September 1051 – 27 December 1087), also called Bertha of Turin, was Queen of Germany from 1066 and Holy Roman Empress from 1084 until 1087 as the first wife of Emperor Henry IV.

== Life ==
Bertha of Savoy was a daughter of Otto, Count of Savoy (also called Eudes or Odo; c. 1023 – c. 1057/1060), and his wife Adelaide of Susa (c. 1014/1020 – 1091) from the Arduinici noble family, and as such a member of the Burgundian House of Savoy. She was the sister of Peter I, Count of Savoy (d. 1078); Amadeus II, Count of Savoy (d. 1080); and Adelaide (d. 1079), consort of the German anti-king Rudolf of Rheinfelden.

=== Marriage ===
Bertha was betrothed, at the age of four, to Emperor Henry III's son, Henry (aged five) on 25 December 1055 in Zurich. Bertha was raised in Germany thereafter. When she was fifteen, Bertha was crowned queen in Würzburg in June 1066 and married Henry on 13 July 1066 at the Königspfalz of Trebur.

Although they had grown up together and Bertha was apparently a pretty young woman, the Saxon chronicler Bruno of Merseburg, an avowed opponent of Henry IV, reported on Henry's continual unfaithfulness: "He had two or three concubines at the same time, in addition [to his wife], yet he was not content. If he heard that someone had a young and pretty daughter or wife, he instructed that she be supplied to him by force. (...) His beautiful and noble wife Bertha (...) was in such a manner hated by him that he never saw her after the wedding any more than necessary, since he had not celebrated the wedding out of free will."

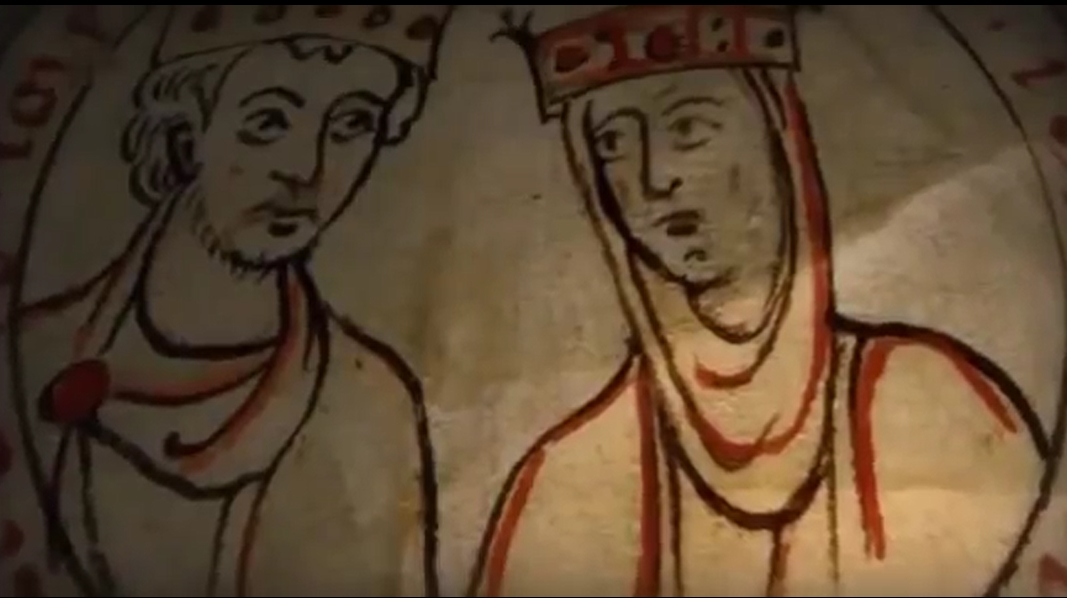
Bertha of Turin and her husband Henry IV

=== Attempted repudiation ===
Despite the insults and humiliations to which she was subjected by her husband, Bertha remained true to him. Nevertheless, in 1069, Henry attempted to repudiate her. At an assembly at Worms, he "explained publicly (before the princes), that his relationship with his wife was not good; for a long time he had deceived others, but now he did not want to do so any longer. He could not accuse her of anything that justified a divorce, but he was not capable of carrying out conjugal relations with her any longer. He asked them for the sake of God to remove him from the bonds of a marriage closed under bad signs ... so that the way to a luckier marriage might be opened. And nobody knowing any objection to raise, and his wife being an obstacle to a second marriage ceremony, he then swore that she was as he received her, unstained and her virginity intact."

The German episcopacy dared not submit to the king's demands, and no conclusion was reached at the Worms assembly. Instead, the German bishops called on Pope Alexander II for assistance and a synod was convened at Frankfurt for later in the year. During this time, Bertha retired to Lorsch Abbey. The papal legate Peter Damian presided at the Frankfurt synod; he opposed Henry's repudiation of Bertha on the grounds of canon law, but many of the German princes were more concerned about the response of Bertha's mother Adelaide. Henry IV reluctantly reconciled with his consort. Their first daughter was born in the following year (1070). On 12 February 1074 their son Conrad was born at Hersfeld Abbey, where Bertha stayed while Henry was fighting against the Saxon Rebellion, and was baptised in the abbey three days later. After Henry's victory against the Saxons, he arranged for an Imperial Diet at Goslar on Christmas Day 1075 to swear an oath recognising Conrad as his successor.

=== Canossa ===
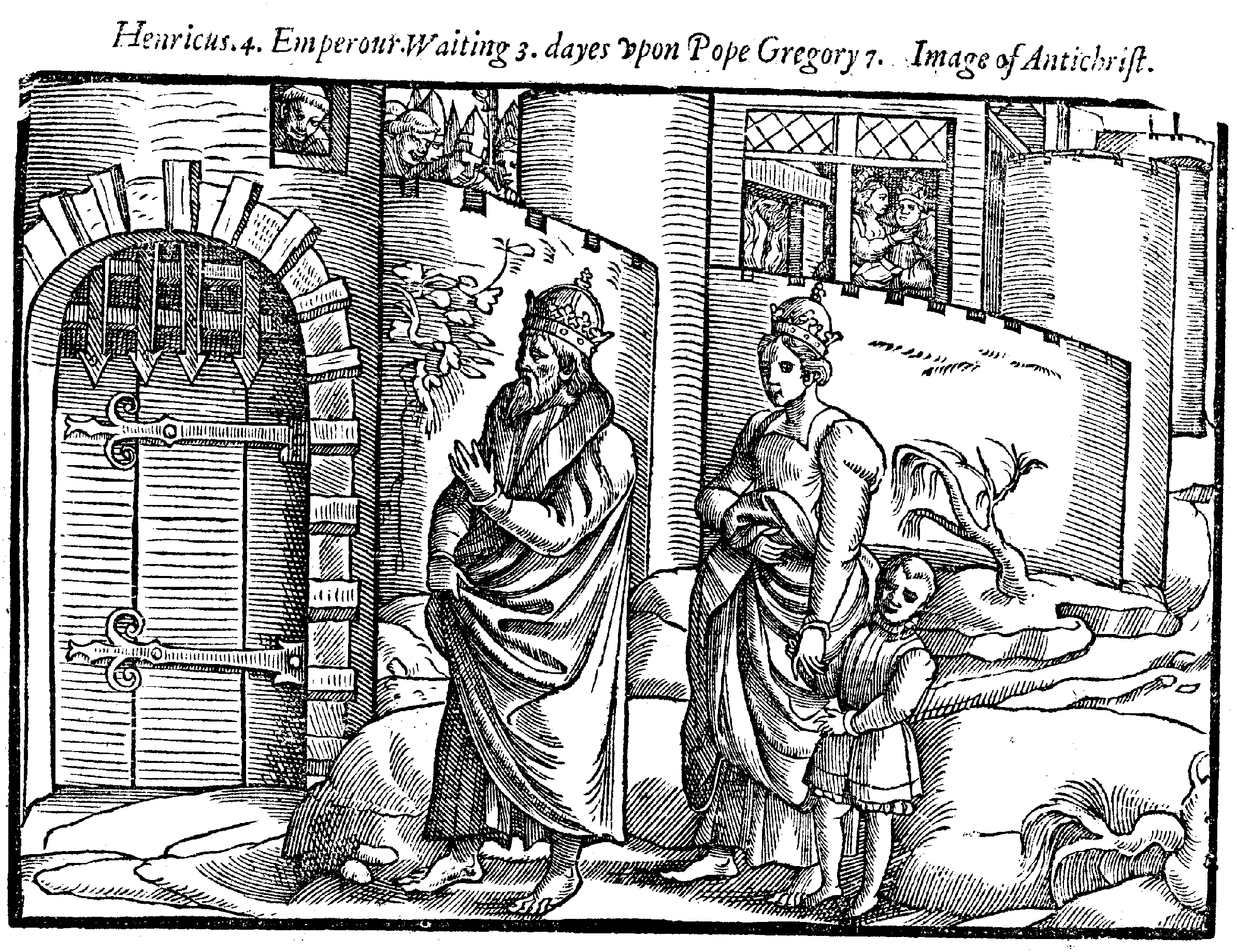
Henry and Bertha with their son, waiting at the gate of Canossa, Foxe's Book of Martyrs (1563)

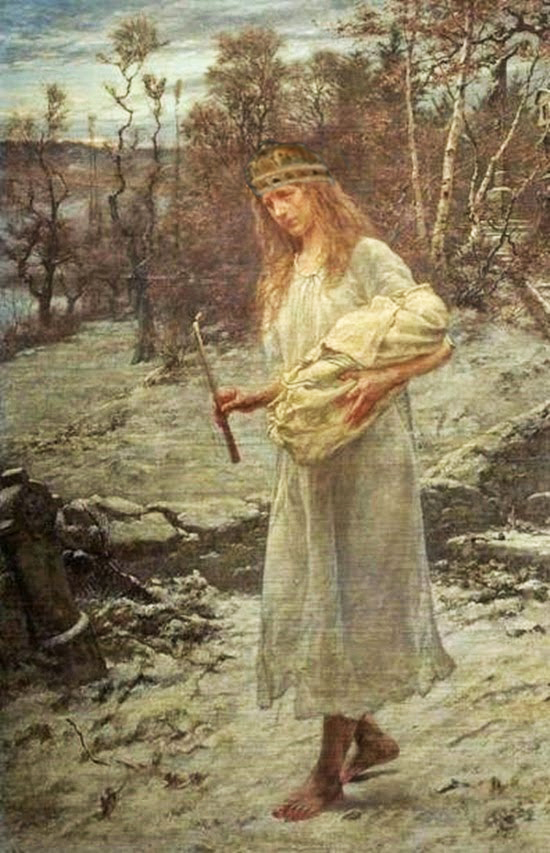
Bertha of Turin in penance

During the fierce Investiture Controversy, Bertha's husband was excommunicated by Pope Gregory VII at the Lenten synod in Rome in 1076. In October, the German princes took the occasion and swore an oath at Trebur that they would no longer recognise Henry as king unless this excommunication was lifted. Henry thus had to cross the Alps and travel to Italy in order to meet with Gregory during the winter of 1076/77.

Bertha and their young son, Conrad, accompanied Henry on his dangerous journey. While the South German princes supporting his rival Rudolf of Rheinfelden blocked his path, Henry hoped to travel through one of the Alpine passes controlled by his mother-in-law, but Adelaide extracted a high price before allowing him to do this. Adelaide then accompanied Henry and Bertha on the long and dangerous Walk to Canossa, where from 25 January 1077, Henry and Bertha underwent penance barefoot for three days outside in the cold and begged Gregory VII's forgiveness. Adelaide was among those who acted as an oath-helper to secure Henry's absolution from excommunication.

After the forces of Henry IV had besieged and occupied Rome, he and Bertha were crowned emperor and empress on 31 March 1084 by Antipope Clement III.

=== Death ===
Bertha was thirty-six years old when she died in Mainz on 27 December 1087. She was buried in the Salian crypt at Speyer Cathedral. In 1089 Emperor Henry married Eupraxia of Kiev but the marriage failed in 1095.

== Children ==
From her marriage with Henry, Bertha eventually had five children, two of whom died while still young:

- Adelheid (1070 – bef. 4 June 1079)
- Henry (1/2 August 1071 – 2 August 1071)
- Agnes (summer 1072/early 1073 – 24 September 1143), married, firstly, Frederick I, Duke of Swabia (the first ruler of the Hohenstaufen dynasty) and, secondly, Leopold III, Margrave of Austria, a member of the House of Babenberg
- Conrad (12 February 1074 – 27 July 1101), later Roman-German King and King of Italy
- Henry V (11 August 1081/86 – 23 May 1125), later Roman-German King and Holy Roman Emperor

== Notes ==
Bertha of Savoy House of Savoy Born: 21 September 1051 Died: 27 December 1087
Royal titles
Preceded by Agnes of Poitou	Holy Roman Empress; 1084–1087	Succeeded by Eupraxia of Kiev
Preceded by Agnes of Poitou	Queen consort of Germany; 1066–1087	Succeeded by Constance of Sicily
