= Otto III of Swabia =

Otto III (died 28 September 1057), also known as Otto the White (German: Otto der Weiße) and Otto of Schweinfurt (Otto von Schweinfurt), was the margrave of the Nordgau (1024–1031) and duke of Swabia (1048–1057). He was the son of Henry of Schweinfurt, margrave of the Nordgau, and Gerberga of Henneberg. Otto was one of the most powerful East Franconian princes by inheritance: having extensive land in the Radenzgau and Schweinfurt. In 1014, he first appears as count of Lower Altmühl (or Kelsgau) and, in 1024, he inherits his father's march. In 1034, Otto became count of the Lower Naab. From then on to his appointment to Swabia, he takes part in many imperial expeditions into Bohemia, Hungary, and Poland. He was betrothed to Matilda, daughter of Bolesław I the Brave, but the arrangement fell through. (Note: Pac states, "It certainly denotes a betrothal, the first element of marriage, followed by an interval – sometimes long – and marriage proper with the transmission of the dos, with the wedding ceremony and the acceptance of the bride into the groom’s household. Thus, when Otto sends Matilda – described as sibi desponsata – away, this means that he sends away a woman 'promised to him' or simply betrothed to him.")

At Ulm in January 1048, the Emperor Henry III appointed him duke of Swabia after a brief vacancy following the death of Otto II. He was loyal to Henry. He was engaged to marry Matilda, daughter of Boleslaus I of Poland, in 1035, but this was put off in favour of a marriage to Immilla, a daughter of Ulric Manfred, Margrave of Turin, as part of Henry's Italian plans. He was otherwise inactive and died after nine years rule and was buried in Schweinfurt.

== Family ==
By his marriage to Immilla of Turin (died 29 April 1078), he had:

- Bertha or Alberada (died 1 April 1103), married firstly Herman II, Count of Kastl, and married secondly Frederick, Count of Kastl
- Gisela, inherited Kulmbach and Plassenburg, married Arnold IV, Count of Andechs
- Judith (died 1104), married firstly Conrad I, Duke of Bavaria, and secondly Botho, Count of Pottenstein
- Eilika, abbess of Niedermünster
- Beatrice (1040–1140), inherited Schweinfurt, married Henry II, Count of Hildrizhausen and Margrave of the Nordgau

== Sources ==
- Pac, Grzegorz (2022). Women in the Piast Dynasty: A Comparative Study of Piast Wives and Daughters (c. 965–c.1144). Brill.
- Previté-Orton, C. W. (1912). The Early History of the House of Savoy: 1000-1233. Cambridge at the University Press.

Preceded by Otto II	Duke of Swabia; 1048–1057	Succeeded by Rudolf
