= Agnes of Burgundy, Duchess of Aquitaine =

Agnès
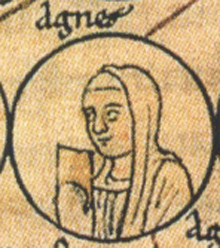

Duchess consort of Aquitaine
- Tenure: c. 1019 - 31 January 1030

Countess consort of Anjou
- Tenure: 1040-1049/52
- Born: Agnes de Mâcon c. 995
- Died: 10 November 1068 (aged 73)
- Spouse: William V, Duke of Aquitaine; Geoffrey II, Count of Anjou
- Issue: William VII, Duke of Aquitaine; William VIII, Duke of Aquitaine; Agnes of Poitou, Holy Roman Empress
- House: House of Ivrea
- Father: Otto-William of Burgundy
- Mother: Ermentrude of Roucy

Agnes of Burgundy (or Agnes de Mâcon; c. 995—10 November 1068) was Duchess of Aquitaine by marriage to Duke William V and Countess of Anjou by marriage to Count Geoffrey II. She served as regent of the Duchy of Aquitaine during the minority of her son from 1039 until 1044.

She was the daughter of Otto-William of Burgundy and Ermentrude of Roucy and a member of the House of Ivrea.

== First marriage: Duchess of Aquitaine ==
In 1019, she married Duke William V of Aquitaine by whom she had three children: William VII, Duke of Aquitaine, William VIII, Duke of Aquitaine and Agnes, Holy Roman Empress. William died on 31 January 1030, leaving his widow and their three young children, plus the three surviving children from his first two marriages. While married to William, Agnès gave many gifts to the abbey of Cluny.

== Second marriage: Countess of Anjou ==
After her husband's death, Agnès lost her influence at the court of Poitiers since her sons were not heirs. In order for her to regain her position and ensure a future for her children, Agnès had to remarry. Thus she married Geoffrey II, Count of Anjou in 1032, which was an attractive offer because his father was the powerful Fulk III, Count of Anjou.

In 1033, Geoffrey's troops invaded Poitou with the support of Agnes. William VI, Duke of Aquitaine, the new Count of Poitou, was captured in March. He was released only in 1036 against a large ransom and he died in 1038 without children. The county then returned to his brother, Agnes' stepson Odo, who was already Duke of Gascony. He went to war against Agnes, her husband and sons. Odo was killed at the battle at Mauzé.

== Regency ==
The succeeding Count of Poitou was Agnes's son, Peter, who took the name of William VII Aigret. Being too young, his mother governed territories in his place from 1039 to 1044 and indeed it even seems the government itself, without her husband. When she transmitted the power to William, she married and took the opportunity to give his second son, Geoffrey Guy the duchy of Gascony, by marrying an heiress. Agnès then joined Geoffrey in Anjou and although she may not have actively participated in the government, certainly had some influence on him.

Agnès and Geoffrey stayed in Germany at the imperial court, so her daughter Agnes could marry Henry III, Holy Roman Emperor. They then bonded with the imperial couple, during a trip to Italy where they participated in the council of Sutri, filing and inducting two popes Pope Clement II, who was quick to crown the emperor and empress. After a pilgrimage to Monte Garaño, the couple went back to Poitou in 1047 where they founded Sainte-Marie-des-Dames. Between 1047 and 1049, Agnes founded the abbey of Saint Nicolas de Poitou.

== Separation from Geoffrey ==
Between 1049 and 1052, Agnès and Geoffrey separated. The reasons are varied: the most logical is the absence of children, however the council of Reims in 1049 condemned certain marriages as incestuous and ruled that they part; in addition, Geoffrey went to war against the King of France who appreciated the little freedom from war that would take his vassal to Germany (it seems that Geoffrey had to swear allegiance to the emperor and to no longer depend on the King of France) and it is very possible that the King imposed on his vanquished vassal that he should divorce his wife. Indeed, Agnès also influenced her husband, but she came from Burgundy and had retained strong links with her homeland, so it may be that it was Agnès who wanted the divorce.

== Later life ==
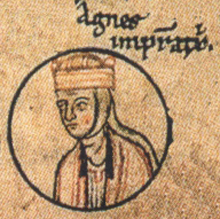
Agnes with her daughter, Empress Agnes, petitioned Pope to place St. Nicholas of Poitou under apostolic protection.

Still, Agnes returned to the court of Poitiers and her son William over whom she had much influence. A war soon broke out between Anjou and Poitou, which saw a victory for Geoffrey in 1053. This would have probably never happened if Agnes had not divorced Geoffrey. In 1058 William left for another war against his former stepfather Count of Anjou, probably because Geoffrey gave the dowry of Agnes to his new wife, Adelaide. William was on the verge of winning when he died of an illness in 1058.

He was succeeded by his brother, Geoffrey Guy, who took the dynastic name of William VIII. The young count had remained close to his step-father, Geoffrey, as the only father figure he knew, and he reconciled with Anjou. But only during Geoffrey's lifetime. In fact, after Geoffrey's death, William did not hesitate to attack his heirs and assume control of Saintonge from 1062. Agnes, despite her retirement, was still very active and did not hesitate to travel throughout Poitou to participate in donations or simply see her son at the court of Poitiers. In 1062, Agnes with her daughter, Empress Agnes, petitioned Pope Alexander II to place St. Nicholaus of Poitou under apostolic protection. Agnes died on 10 November 1068. She is buried at St. Nicolas de Poitiers.

== See also ==
- County of Burgundy
- Dukes of Burgundy family tree

== Sources ==
- Abel, Mickey (2012). "Emma of Blois as Arbiter of Peace and the Politics of Patronage". In Martin, Therese (ed.). Reassessing the Roles of Women as 'Makers' of Medieval Art and Architecture. Brill. pp. 823–864.
- Bachrach, Bernard S. (1993). Fulk Nerra, the Neo-Roman Consul 987-1040. University of California Press.
- Bouchard, Constance Brittain (1987). Sword, Miter, and Cloister: Nobility and the Church in Burgundy, 980-1198. Cornell University Press.
- Johnson, Penelope D. (1991). Equal in Monastic Profession: Religious Women in Medieval France. University of Chicago Press.

Agnes of Burgundy, Duchess of Aquitaine House of Ivrea Born: circa 995 Died: 10 November 1068
Royal titles
Preceded by Prisca of Gascony	Duchess consort of Aquitaine; 1019-1030	Succeeded by Eustachie of Montreuil-Bellay
Preceded by Hildegard of Metz	Countess consort of Anjou; 1040-1049/52	Succeeded by Grécie of Langeais
