= Susa Cathedral =

Susa Cathedral Italian: Duomo di Susa
- Cathedral of Saint Justus; Italian: Cattedrale di San Giusto
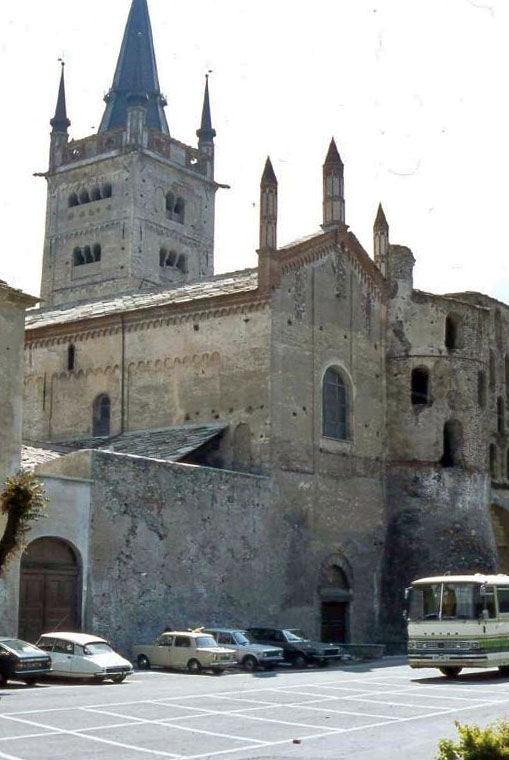
- Susa Cathedral; Italian: Duomo di Susa
- 45°8′14″N 7°2′41″E
- Location: Piazza San Giusto; Susa, TO
- Country: Italy
- Denomination: Catholic
- Website: www.duomoditorino.it

History
- Status: Cathedral
- Dedication: Saint Justus of Novalesa

Architecture
- Functional status: Active
- Style: Romanesque
- Years built: 1029 (as a Benedictine abbey); 1100

Administration
- Province: Turin
- Archdiocese: Susa

Clergy
- Bishop: Alfonso Badini Confalonieri

Susa Cathedral (Italian: Cattedrale di San Giusto, or Duomo di Susa) is a Catholic cathedral in Susa, Piedmont, in northern Italy. It is the seat of the Bishop of Susa and is dedicated to Saint Justus of Novalesa (Italian: San Giusto).

In origin it was the church of the Benedictine Abbey of St. Justus, established in 1029 by Marchese Olderico Manfredi to house the newly discovered relics of Saint Justus. The church was built around 1100 and has since been refurbished and restored several times. It was not until 1772 that the bishopric of Susa was created from the territory of the abbey, previously a territorial abbacy, and at that point the abbey church was made the cathedral of the new diocese.

The cathedral is a Romanesque style building. The façade has terracotta decorations and is joined to a Roman gate of the 4th century, the Porta Savoia, to the south. Halfway along the south side stands the campanile, with six levels of mullioned windows.

The interior is on the Latin Cross plan, with three aisles. It contains a baptistry which is earlier than the present church, and a statue supposedly of Adelaide, Marchioness of Turin, daughter and heiress of Olderico Manfredi and wife of Otto, Count of Savoy, ancestress of the Royal House of Savoy.

== Sources ==
- Santi e Beati: Santi Giusto, Flaviano e compagni (in Italian)
