= Ulric Manfred II of Turin =

Italian nobleman (died c. 1033)

- Marquis of Turin
- Died: c. 1033; Turin
- Noble family: Arduinici
- Spouse: Bertha of Milan
- Issue: Adelaide of Susa; Immilla; Bertha
- Father: Manfred I of Turin
- Mother: Prangarda of Canossa

Ulric Manfred II (Italian: Olderico Manfredi II; 975 x 992 – 29 October 1033 or 1034) or Manfred Ulric (Manfredo Udalrico) was the count of Turin and marquis of Susa in the early 11th century. He was the last male margrave from the Arduinid dynasty. Ulric Manfred's daughter, Adelaide, inherited the majority of his property. Through marriage to Adelaide (c. 1045), Otto of Savoy, a younger son of Count Humbert I of Savoy, became margrave of Turin. Their descendants would later comprise the House of Savoy, who ruled Sardinia and Italy.

== Biography ==
Born in Turin, Ulric Manfred was the son of Manfred I and Prangarda (daughter of Adalbert Atto of Canossa). Ulric Manfred inherited a vast march centred on Turin (1000), which had been created from the lands of his ancestor Arduin Glaber. An imperial diploma, dated 31 July 1001, records that, for his faithful service, Emperor Otto III confirmed Ulric Manfred's possessions and granted him several privileges.

Ulric Manfred, immediately upon his succession, began to consolidate his power vis-à-vis Arduin of the March of Ivrea on one hand and Henry II on the other. In the fight over the regnum Italicum, he gained a great deal of territory at the expense of the March of Ivrea.

Two charters issued by Ulric Manfred and his wife Bertha (a sale to the priest Sigifred, son of Adalgis in 1021 and a donation to the monastery of S. Solutore in Turin in 1031), give a good impression of the cities and counties that Ulric Manfred controlled, which included: Turin, Ivrea, Albenga, Ventimiglia, Auriate, Tortona, and Vercelli. In all the wars between Arduin and Henry, Ulric Manfred prudently avoided any confrontation with the two leaders and gradually extended his territories by arms (he was at war with the margrave of Tuscany, Boniface III, in 1016) and by increasing his authority within his proper domains. In 1024, following the death of Henry II, he opposed the election of Conrad II and instead invited William V of Aquitaine to take the Italian throne, but to no avail.

Ulric Manfred had a palace in Turin, but like many other medieval lords, he lived an itinerant life. He moved from castle to castle in order to maintain his control and to effect the administration of his dominions. It is often said that Ulric Manfred's daughter Adelaide abandoned Turin as a capital and began to reside permanently at Susa. This is incorrect. Adelaide is documented far more frequently at the Margravial Palace in Turin than anywhere else.

Around 1028, Ulric Manfred, along with his brother, Bishop Alric of Asti, Archbishop Aribert of Milan and Bishop Landulf of Turin, acted to suppress a heretical movement which had developed at Monforte.

Ulric Manfred restored the old church of Santa Maria Maggiore in Susa and Novalesa Abbey. In May 1028, with his wife Bertha, Ulric Manfred founded the convent of Santa Maria at Caramagna. The following year, in July 1029, along with his wife, Bertha, and his brother, Bishop Alric of Asti, Ulric Manfred founded the Benedictine abbey in S. Giusto in Susa, which housed the relics of Saint Justus of Novalesa. The church of the Abbey of San Giusto is now Susa Cathedral.

Ulric Manfred fortified the villages of Exilles and Bardonecchia.

He died in 1033 or 1034 and was buried in Turin Cathedral.

== Family ==
Ulric Manfred married Bertha by 1014 at the latest (that year, Emperor Henry II confirmed their joint donation to the abbey of Fruttuaria).

With Bertha, Ulric Manfred had three daughters:

- Adelaide, his heir
- Immilla
- Bertha

== Sources ==
- Die Urkunden Otto des III. (Ottonis III. Diplomata), MGH Diplomata II (Hannover, 1893), accessible online at: Monumenta Germaniae Historia
- Previté-Orton, C. W. (1912). The Early History of the House of Savoy: 1000-1233. Cambridge at the University Press.
- W. Trillmich, Kaiser Konrad II und seine Zeit (1991)
- H. Bresslau, Jahrbücher des Deutschen Reichs unter Konrad II., 2 vols. (1884), accessible online at: archive.org
- C.W. Previté-Orton, The Early History of the House of Savoy (1000-1233) (Cambridge, 1912), accessible online at: archive.org
- G. Sergi, 'Una grande circoscrizione del regno italico: la marca arduinica di Torino,’ in Studi Medievali XII (1971), 637-712
- G. Sergi, 'I poli del potere pubblico e dell'orientamento signorile degli Arduinici: Torino e Susa, in La contessa Adelaide e la società del secolo XI, a special edition of Segusium 32 (1992), pp. 61–76
- H. Fichtenau, Heretics and Scholars in the High Middle Ages, 1000-1250 (1998).

Ulric Manfred II of Turin Arduinici Born: 975 x 992 Died: 29 October 1033/4
Preceded by Manfred I	Margrave of Turin; 1000–1034	Succeeded by Adelaide of Susa
