= Prangarda of Canossa =

10th-century Italian noblewoman

Prangarda of Canossa (died after 991), was a northern Italian noblewoman.

== Life ==
Prangarda was a member of the House of Canossa. Her father was Adalbert Atto of Canossa, and her mother was Hildegard (who was probably a member of the Supponid dynasty). Prangarda married Manfred I of Turin, perhaps after the siege of Canossa in 951, but more likely after 962. In 991 Prangarda issued a charter, with Manfred's consent, in which she sold her share of the estate of Vilinianum in Parma. It is clear from this charter that Prangarda's dowry included lands totalling at least one thousand iugera (roughly 650 acres) in Parma and Reggio.

=== Children ===
With Manfred, Prangarda had several children, including:

- Ulric Manfred
- Alric
- Otto
- Atto
- Hugo
- Wido

== Bibliography ==
- Previté-Orton, C.W. (1912), The Early History of the House of Savoy (1000-1233), Cambridge.
- V. Fumagalli, Le origini di una grande dinastia feudale Adalberto-Atto di Canossa (Tübingen, 1971).
- T. Lazzari, ‘Aziende fortificate, castelli e pievi: le basi patrimoniali dei poteri dei Canossa e le loro giurisdizioni,’ in A. Calzona, ed., Matilde e il tesoro dei Canossa tra castelli, monasteri e città (Milan, 2008), pp. 96–115, accessible at:
- G. Sergi, ‘Una grande circoscrizione del regno italico: la marca arduinica di Torino,’ Studi Medievali XII (1971), 637–712
- C. Violante, ‘Quelques caractéristiques des structures familiales en Lombardie, Emilie, et Toscane aux Xle et XII siècles,’ in G. Duby, and J. le Goff, eds., Famille et parenté dans l’Occident médiéval (Paris, 1977), pp. 87–148.
