= Otto of Savoy =

Count of Savoy (c. 1023–1057/1060)

Otto
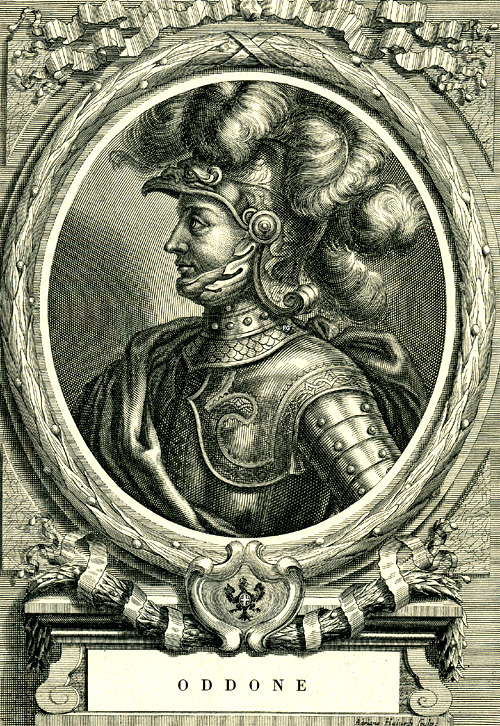

Count of Savoy
- Reign: 1051 or 1056 – c. 1057 or 1060
- Predecessor: Amadeus I
- Successor: Peter I
- Born: c. 1023
- Died: c. 1057/1060
- Noble family: House of Savoy
- Spouse: Adelaide of Susa (m. c. 1046)
- Issue more...: Peter I, Count of Savoy; Amadeus II, Count of Savoy; Bertha, Holy Roman Empress; Adelaide, Duchess of Swabia
- Father: Humbert I, Count of Savoy
- Mother: Ancilla of Lenzburg

Otto (French: Odon, Oddon, Othon; Italian: Oddone; c. 1023 – 1057/1060) was count of Savoy from around 1051 until his death. Through marriage to Adelaide, the heiress of Ulric Manfred II, he also administered the march of Susa from around 1046 until his death.

== Family ==
He was a younger son of Humbert the White-Handed and his wife, Ancilla of Lenzburg. The first evidence of him is dated 1030, when together with his father and brothers, he contributed to a donation to the Order of Cluny, which established the foundation of the Priory of Borghetto, an ancient patronage of the family. Through Humbert's service to the German emperors, the family was granted the counties of Maurienne, Aosta and Sapaudia (Savoy), all at the expense of local bishops or archbishops. Otto inherited the family's realms after the death of his brother Amadeus c. 1051.

In 1046, he married Adelaide, heiress of the march of Susa and county of Turin. They had:

- Peter (d. 1078)
- Amadeus (d. 1080)
- Otto (Note: Otto is sometimes said to be Bishop Otto III of Asti (r. c. 1080 – c. 1088), but this identification is uncertain.)
- Bertha (d. 1087), wife of Henry IV of Germany
- Adelaide (d. 1080), married Rudolf of Swabia

== Rule ==
Through his marriage to Adelaide, Otto obtained extensive possessions in northern Italy. Thereafter, the House of Savoy concentrated its expansion efforts towards Italy instead of north of the Alps as it had done before. Savoy's lands occupied much of modern Savoy and Piedmont, although several other small states could be found between them. In the 1050s, Otto allowed coins to be minted at Aiguebelle. The archbishop of Vienne, Léger, who had sole right of minting in the region, complained to Pope Leo IX, so Otto forbade further coining at Aiguebelle.

== Sources ==
- Demotz, B. (2000). Le Comté de Savoie du XIe au XVe siècle: Pouvoir, Château et État au Moyen Âge (in French). Editions Slatkine.
- Hellmann, Siegmund (1900). Die Grafen von Savoyen und das Reich bis zum Ende der staufischen Periode (in German). Wagner.
- Previte-Orton, C. W. (1912). The Early History of the House of Savoy: 1000-1233. Cambridge at the University Press.
- Vergano, Lodovico (1951). Storia di Asti (in Italian). Vol. I. Comune di Asti, Assessorato per la cultura.

Otto of Savoy House of Savoy Born: c. 1023 Died: c. 1057/1060
Regnal titles
| Preceded by Amadeus I | Count of Savoy; 1051 or 1056 – c. 1057 | Succeeded by Peter I |
| Preceded by Henry | Margrave of Turin c. 1046 – c. 1057/60; With: Adelaide | Succeeded by Peter I |
