= Auriate =

Auriate was a county in medieval Italy on the eastern slopes of the Western Alps lying between Cuneo and Saluzzo. The county existed from the late ninth century to the middle of the tenth. The name of the county survives in that of the comune of Valloriate.

The earliest known count was one Rodulf, who died in 902, leaving the county to a Frank named Roger, who had been his second-in-command. Between 940 and 945 Roger's son and successor, Arduin Glaber, drove the Saracens from the Val di Susa and annexed that region to his county of Auriate. Arduin was a supporter of Berengar of Ivrea in his successful bid for the Iron Crown of Lombardy in 950. The following year (951) Berengar completed a reorganisation of western Lombardy, creating three new marches to better defend the coast from Saracen attacks: the March of Genoa (Eastern Liguria), the March of Montferrat (Western Liguria), and the March of Turin. Arduin was created the first Margrave of Turin.

At this time Auriate disappears from the records as a distinct entity, but it remained the centre of the property of the Arduinici family three generations later, when Bertha married Ottone del Vasto of the Aleramici clan. Their joint properties formed the nucleus of the later March of Saluzzo.
