= Susa, Piedmont =

Susa Suisa (Arpitan) Suse (French)
- Comune
- Città di Susa
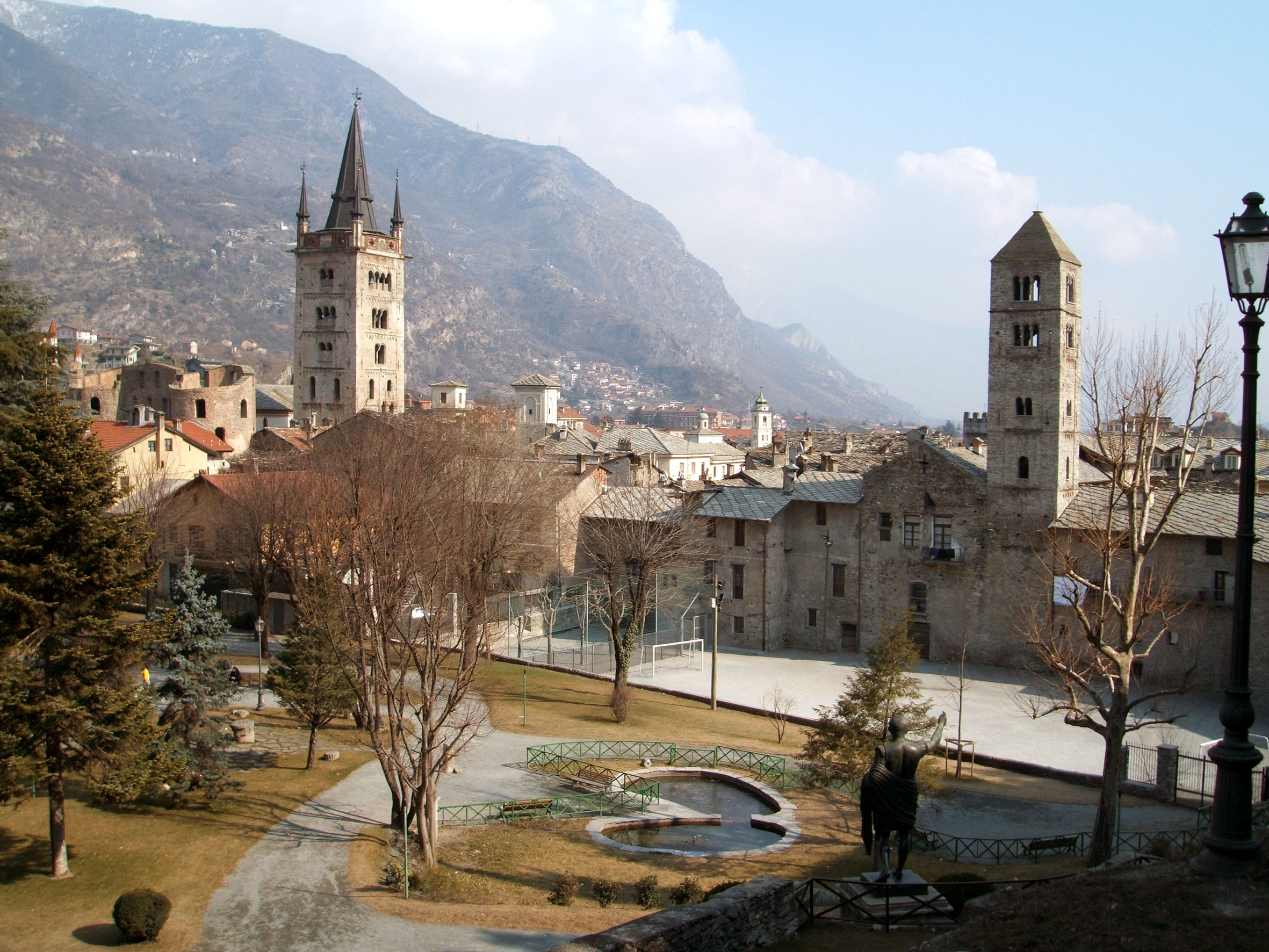

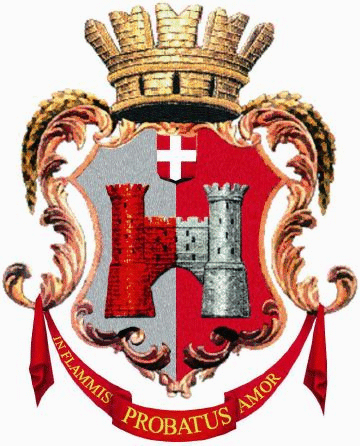
- Coat of arms

- Location within Italy Location within Piedmont
- Coordinates: 45°08′N 07°03′E
- Country: Italy
- Region: Piedmont
- Metropolitan city: Turin (TO)
- Frazioni: Braide, Coldimosso, Cordera, Crotte, Foresto, Garelli, Polveriera, Pradonio, San Giacomo, San Giuliano, Traduerivi

Government
  - Mayor: Sandro Plano

Area
  - Total: 10.99 km^{2} (4.24 sq mi)
- Elevation: 503 m (1,650 ft)

Population (1-1-2018)
  - Total: 6,340
  - Density: 577/km^{2} (1,490/sq mi)
- Demonym: Segusini
- Time zone: UTC+1 (CET)
  - Summer (DST): UTC+2 (CEST)
- Postal code: 10059
- Dialing code: 0122
- Patron saint: St. Mary of the Snow
- Saint day: August 5
- Website: Official website

Susa (Latin: Secusia; Segusio, Arpitan: Suisa, French: Suse) is a town and comune in the Metropolitan City of Turin, Piedmont, Italy. In the middle of Susa Valley, it is situated on at the confluence of the Cenischia with the Dora Riparia, a tributary of the Po River, at the foot of the Cottian Alps, 51 km (32 mi) west of Turin.

== History ==
Susa (Latin: Segusio) was founded by the Ligures. It was the capital of the Segusini (also known as Cottii). In the late 1st century BC it became voluntarily part of the Roman Empire. Remains of the Roman city have been found in the excavations of the central square, the Piazza Savoia. Susa was the capital of the province of Alpes Cottiae. According to the medieval historian Rodulfus Glaber, Susa was "the oldest of Alpine towns".

In the Middle and Modern ages, Susa remained important as a hub of roads connecting southern France to Italy. Taking part of the county or march of Turin (sometimes called the "march of Susa"). In 1167, Frederick I, Holy Roman Emperor and Holy Roman Empress Beatrice were attacked here; the emperor disguised as a horse servant to flee, while the empress was imprisoned until permitted to depart in 1168. In 1174 the emperor pillaged Susa in revenge. Susa was perhaps the earliest mint of the counts of Savoy; there exist coins from the 11th-12th centuries with "Secusia" on the reverse.

Henry of Segusio, usually called Hostiensis, (c. 1200 – 1271) an Italian canonist of the thirteenth century, was born in the city. During the Napoleonic era a new road, the Via Napoleonica, was built. The city's role as a communications hub has been confirmed recently by a nationwide dispute over the construction of the proposed Turin-Lyon high-speed rail link (TAV) to France.

== Main sights ==
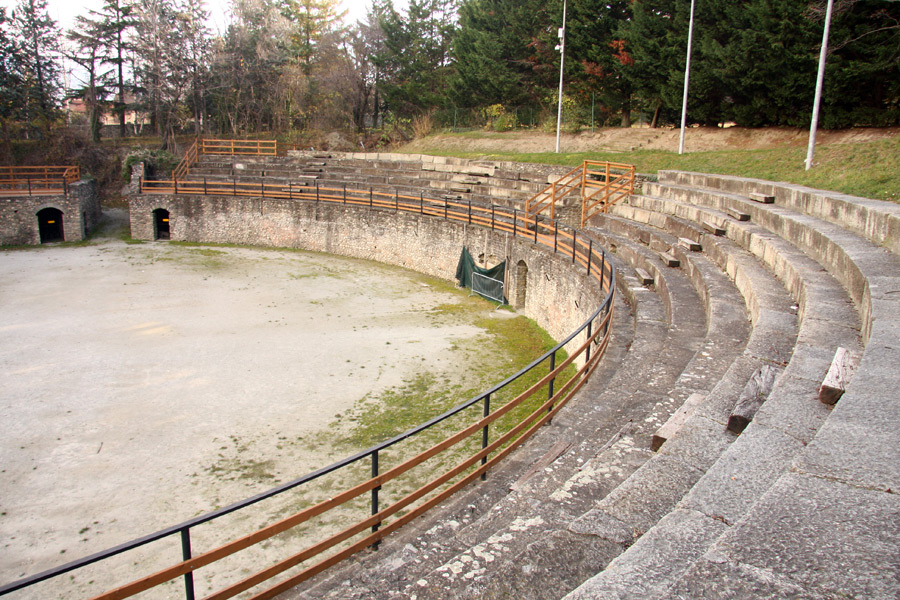
Roman Amphitheater of Susa

- Susa Cathedral (Italian: Cattedrale di San Giusto) (1029).
- The triumphal Arch of Augustus, erected by a Romanized Sugusian chief to Augustus in 8 BC.
- The Roman Amphitheater.
- Castle of Marquise Adelaide. It is likely located in the same site of the ancient Roman Praetorium.
- Archaeological area of Piazza Savoia.

== Twin cities ==
- Barnstaple, United Kingdom
- Briançon, France
- Paola, Italy

== See also ==
- Val di Susa
- Treno Alta Velocità
- Roman Catholic Diocese of Susa
- Treaty of Susa
