= Peter I of Savoy =

Count of Savoy (1060-1078)

Peter I
- Count of Savoy and Margrave of Turin
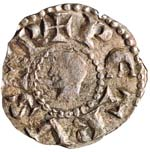
- Coin bearing the stamped image of Peter I, Count of Savoy
- Predecessor: Otto of Savoy
- Successor: Amadeus II of Savoy
- Born: c. 1048
- Died: 9 August 1078
- Noble family: House of Savoy
- Spouse: Agnes of Aquitaine
- Issue: Agnes; Alice
- Father: Otto I, Count of Savoy
- Mother: Adelaide of Susa

Peter I (c. 1048 – 9 August 1078) was count of Savoy and margrave of Turin jointly with his brother Amadeus II of Savoy from c. 1060 to 1078. He ruled only nominally, as true power was in the hands of his mother, Adelaide of Susa.

Peter presided over court hearings alongside Adelaide and also issued several donation charters with her and his brothers Amadeus II of Savoy and Otto. Shortly before his death, Peter united with Bishop Cunibert of Turin in an attempt to drive Abbot Benedict II from his abbey of San Michele della Chiusa.

Peter married Agnes of Aquitaine, c.1065. They had two daughters:

- Agnes (d.after 1110), who married Frederick of Montbéliard in 1080. After marrying Agnes, Frederick became Margrave of Turin (r.1080-1091).
- Alice (d.ca 1111), who may have married Margrave Boniface of Vasto and Saluzzo in 1099

== Notes ==
Peter I of Savoy House of Savoy Born: c. 1048 Died: 9 August 1078
Preceded by Otto	Count of Savoy c. 1060–1078; With: Amadeus II	Succeeded by Amadeus II
Preceded by Otto	Margrave of Turin c. 1060–1078; With: Adelaide	Succeeded by Frederick of Montbéliard
