= March of Turin =

Italian Marquisiate

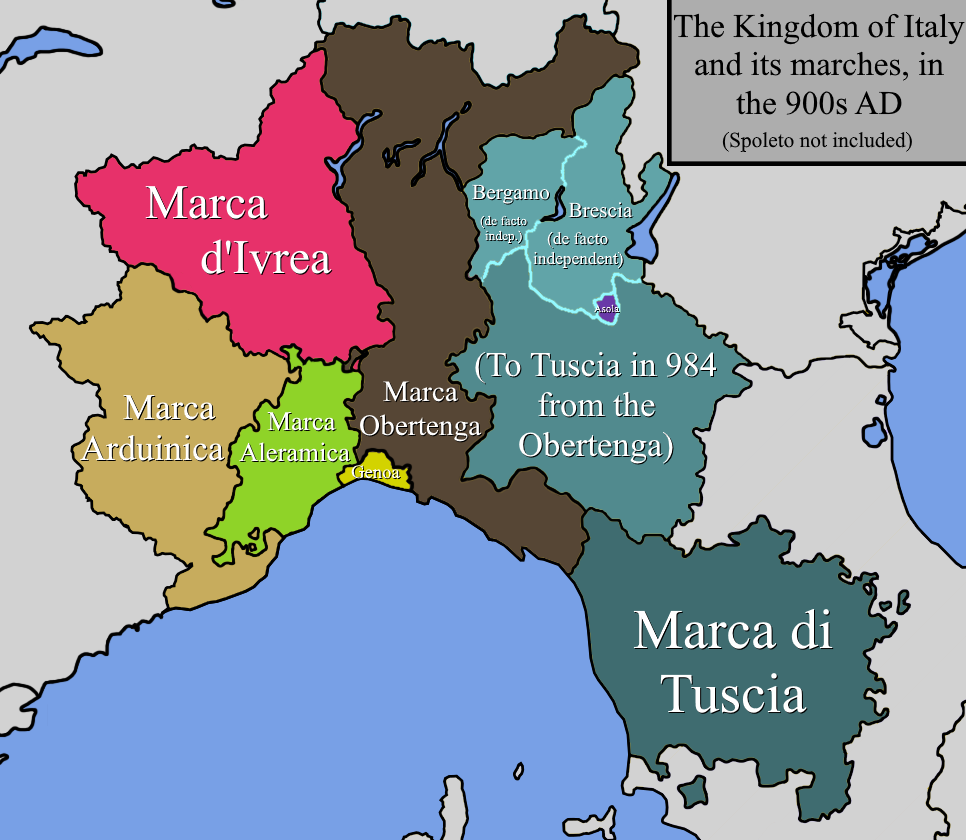
Imperial marches of Northern Italy in the 900s

The March or Marquisate of Turin was a territory of medieval Italy from the mid-10th century, when it was established as the Arduinic March (Latin: marca Arduinica). It comprised several counties in Piedmont, including the counties of Turin, Auriate, Albenga and, probably, Ventimiglia. (Note: For a description of the confines of the march of Turin, see Sergi.) The confines of the march thus stretched across the Po Valley from the Western Alps in the north, to the Ligurian Sea.

Because of the later importance of the city and valley of Susa to the House of Savoy, whose members styled themselves as "marquises of Susa", the march is sometimes referred to as the March or Marquisate of Susa. Yet in the tenth and early eleventh centuries, the city and valley of Susa were not the most important part of the county, let alone the march, of Turin. Successive members of the Arduinici dynasty were documented far more frequently in their capital, the city of Turin, than anywhere else, and until the late 1020s, Susa was controlled by a cadet branch of the dynasty, rather than by the marquises themselves.

== History ==
The formal history of the march began around 951 after Berengar of Ivrea became the king of Italy. At that time Berengar completed the reorganization of the military districts south of the Po River that was begun by his predecessor Hugh of Arles to defend against attacks by the Saracens from the sea. In doing so, he formed three new territories, for which he appointed margraves with loyal followers:

- Marquisate of Turin, which came to be known for a short period as Marca Arduinica based upon Berengar’s appointment of Arduin Glaber as the margrave. Prior to his appointment, Arduin Glaber had been invested as count of Turin in 941 by Hugh of Arles. To his credit, Arduin had captured Turin and the Susa Valley from the Saracens.
- Western Liguria, which came to be known for a short period as Marca Aleramica based upon Berengar’s appointment of his son-in-law, Aleramo as the margrave.
- Eastern Liguria, which came to be known for a short period as Marca Obertenga based upon Berengar’s appointment of Oberto von Luni as the margrave. This territory was also known as the marca Januensis or March of Genoa as its capital city was Genoa.

In 961, Holy Roman Emperor Otto I invaded Italy and displaced Berengar. Otto then continued the work that had been done to reorganize the northwest into the three great marches and in 964 he appointed Arduin margrave of Turin.

The march continued to be ruled by members of the Arduinici thereafter. Arduin Glaber's son Manfred I succeeded him and his son, Ulric Manfred II, succeeded him. Ulric had no son, so he left the march to his daughter Adelaide. Although Adelaide ruled in her own right, de jure control passed to her husband Otto, count of Aosta. Their descendants would later comprise the House of Savoy. Gundulph, the father of St Anselm, may have represented a collateral branch of Manfred's dynasty.

After Adelaide’s death in 1091, the march of Turin broke up. Comital authority in the city of Turin was invested in the bishop of Turin (1092) and the city itself became a commune (1091). In 1092, the emperor Henry IV appointed his son Conrad as margrave of Turin (Conrad was Adelaide’s grandson via her daughter Bertha of Savoy). Although Conrad attempted to gain control of the march, his power was never effectual and the title was largely nominal. Instead, the northern part of the march of Turin was absorbed into Savoy, which was ruled by another of Adelaide’s grandsons, Humbert II (many centuries later, Turin became the capital of this dynasty.) To the south, lands which had composed the march of Turin were annexed by Adelaide's nephew, Boniface del Vasto.

== List of Margraves of Turin ==
=== Arduinici ===
- 964–977 Arduin Glaber
- 977–1000 Manfred I
- 1000–1034 Ulric Manfred II
- 1034–1091 Adelaide, co-ruler with her husbands, sons and grandson-in-law.

=== House of Babenberg ===
- 1037–1038 Herman IV, Duke of Swabia (Adelaide's first husband)

=== Aleramici ===
- 1041–1045 Henry, Margrave of Montferrat (Adelaide's second husband)

=== House of Savoy ===
- 1046–1060 Otto, Count of Savoy (Adelaide's third husband)
- 1060–1078 Peter I, Count of Savoy (Adelaide's son)
- 1078–1080 Amadeus II, Count of Savoy (Adelaide's son)

=== House of Montbéliard ===
- 1080–1091 Frederick of Montbéliard (Adelaide's grandson-in-law)

The title Count of Turin was later used by Prince Vittorio Emanuele of Savoy, a member of the House of Savoy which ruled Italy from 1861 and 1946.
