= Susa Valley =

Valley in the Metropolitan City of Turin, northern Italy

- Val di Susa (Italian); Val de Suse (French)
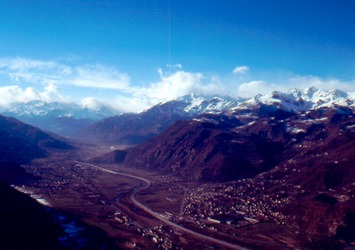
- The central part of the valley

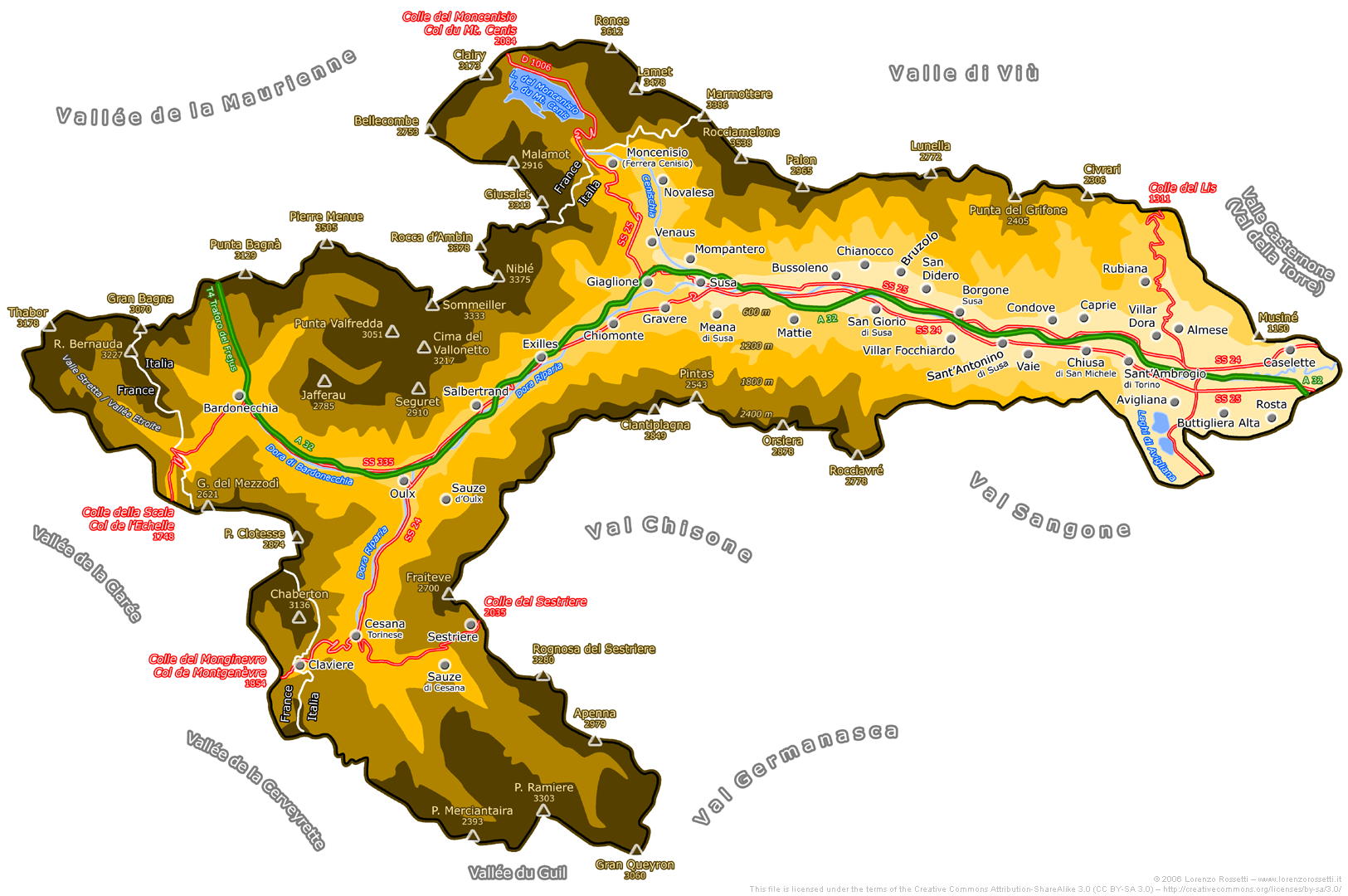
- Map of the valley
- Floor elevation: 300–3,612 metres (984–11,850 ft)
- Length: Around 50 kilometres (31 mi) east-west

Naming
- Native name: Valsusa (Piedmontese); Val d'Ors (Occitan); Vâl Susa (Arpitan)

Geology
- Type: Mainly glacial valley

Geography
- Location: Piedmont (Italy); Provence-Alpes-Côte d'Azur and Auvergne-Rhône-Alpes (France)
- Coordinates: 45°08′N 7°03′E

The Susa Valley (Arpitan: Vâl Susa; Piedmontese: Valsusa; Occitan: Val d'Ors; Italian: Val di Susa; French: Val de Suse) is a valley in the Metropolitan City of Turin, Piedmont region of northern Italy, located between the Graian Alps in the north and the Cottian Alps in the south. It is one of the longest valleys of the Italian Alps. It extends over 50 kilometres (31 mi) in an east-west direction from the French border to the outskirts of Turin. The valley takes its name from the city of Susa which lies in the valley. The Dora Riparia river, a tributary of the Po, flows through the valley.

A motorway runs through the valley from Turin to Chambéry in France through the Fréjus tunnel or by crossing the Col du Mont Cenis (2083m), and to Briançon, also in France, over the Col de Montgenèvre.

== Geography ==
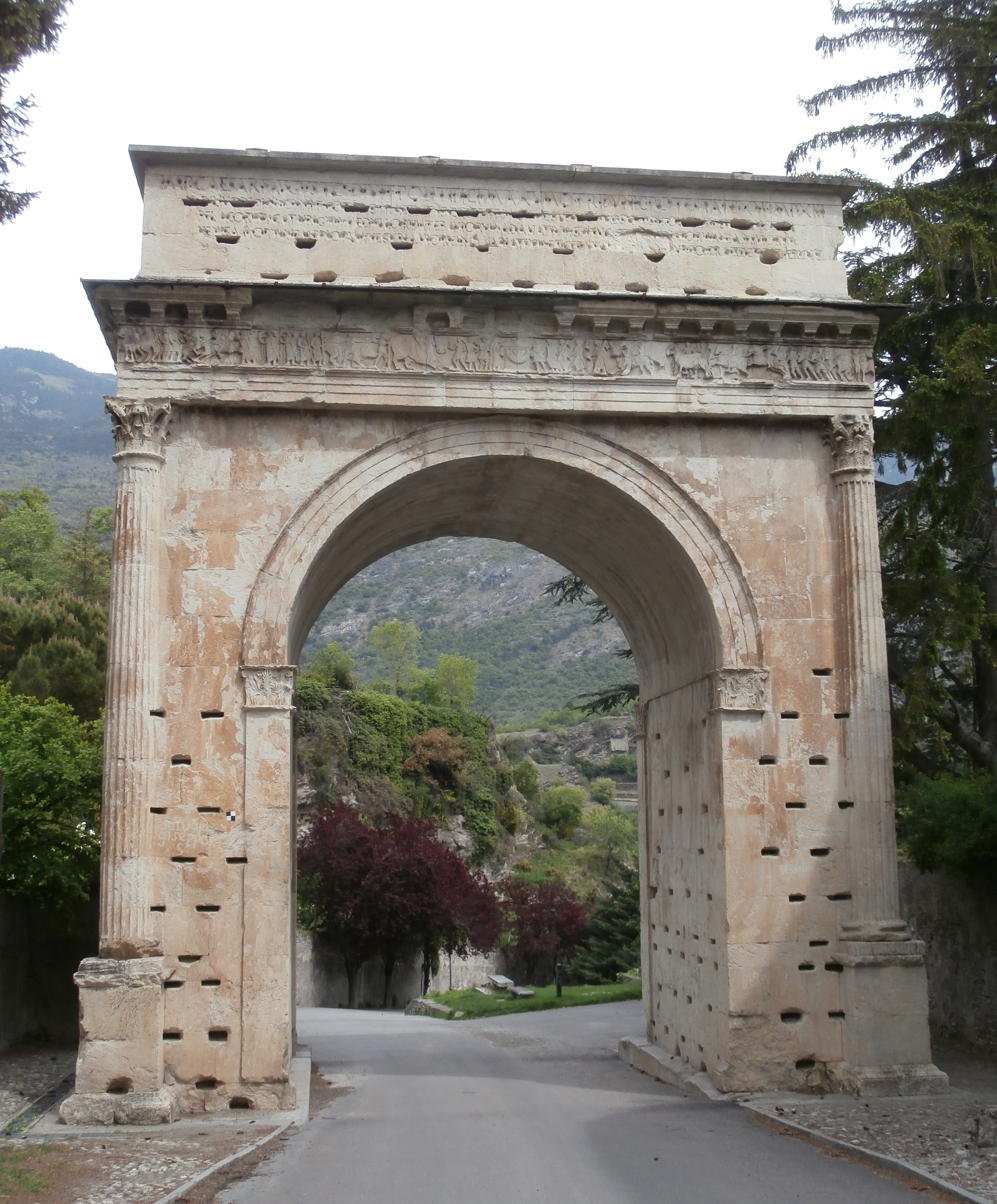
Susa's Arch of Augustus.

Peaks that surround the valley include:

- Pointe de Ronce - 3,612 m
- Rocciamelone - 3,538 m
- Pierre Menue - 3,506 m
- Rognosa d'Etiache - 3,382 m
- Punta Sommeiller - 3,332 m
- Punta Ramiere - 3,303 m
- Mont Chaberton - 3,131 m
- Monte Orsiera - 2,890
- Punta Lunella - 2,272 m
- Monte Colombano - 1,658 m
- Monte Musinè - 1,150 m

== History ==
During the Roman age, Augustus formed an alliance with the Segusini of Cottii Regnum to link Italy and France by building a road through the Valley and over the Col de Montgenèvre (Passo del Monginevro), now 2 km away from the Italian border.

During the Middle Ages, the road was called Via Francigena, and pilgrims arriving from France passed through Mont Cenis and the Susa Valley on their way to Rome. It was one of the most used Alpine passes from the Middle Ages to the Nineteenth Century. Several abbeys were built to accommodate pilgrims, such as Novalesa Abbey founded in 726AD on the foot of a mountain and the monumental Sacra di San Michele abbey.

Susa Valley in access to Italy from France

== Main sights ==
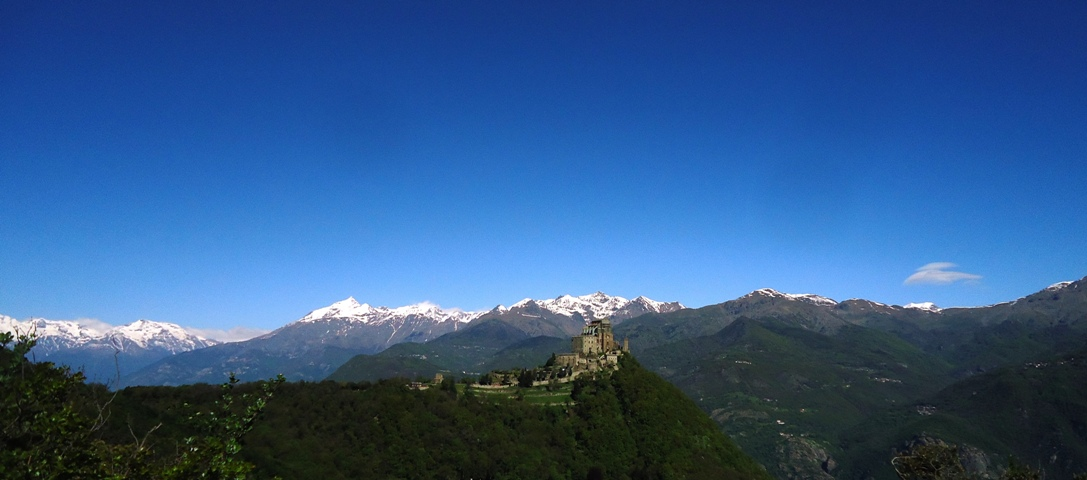
Saint Michael's Abbey and the Alps of Susa Valley.

- Sacra di San Michele (Saint Michael's Abbey), established in the 11th century on the top of Pirchiriano Mountain, at the valley's entrance from Turin.
- Novalesa Abbey, established by Patrice Abbo of Provence in 726AD en route to the Mont Cenis Pass.
- Susa Cathedral, ancient San Giusto Abbey, in Susa, established by Olderico Manfredi in 1029.
- Susa's Arch of Augustus, established in 8BC.
- Montebenedetto Charterhouse (Villar Focchiardo), established in 1197.
- Castle of Bruzolo, built in 1227.
- Casaforte di Chianocco
- Fort of Exilles

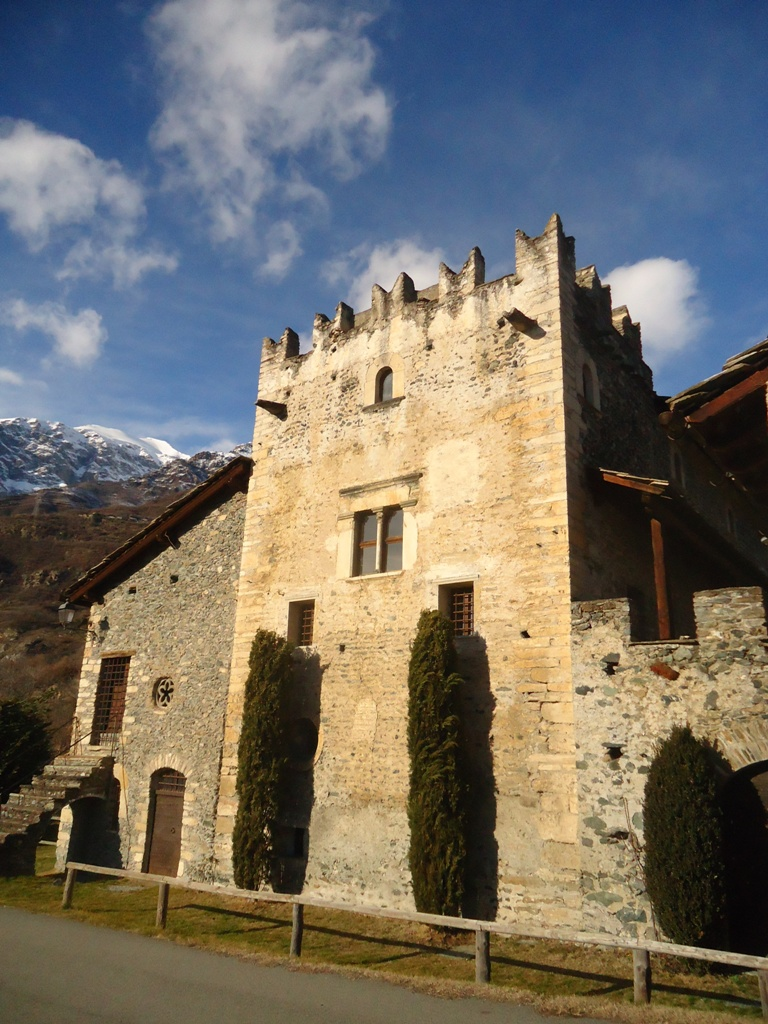
Casaforte Chianocco.

== Turin–Lyon high-speed railway ==
Protesters have fought a 10-year battle to prevent a 57 kilometres (35 mi) rail tunnel being built through the valley.
