= Blessed Margaret of Savoy =

Marchioness of Montferrat, Princess of Achaea Roman Catholic saint

Blessed Margaret of Savoy TOSD
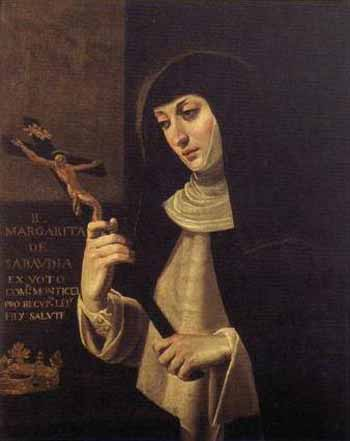
- Born: 21 June 1382 or 1390; Fossano
- Died: 23 November 1464; Casale
- Venerated in: Roman Catholic Church
- Beatified: 9 October 1669 by Pope Clement IX
- Feast: 23 November

Margaret of Savoy (21 June 1382 or 1390 – 23 November 1464) was Marchioness of Montferrat, and a Dominican Sister.

== Family ==
Margaret was the eldest of the four children—all daughters—born to Amadeo of Savoy, Lord of Piedmont (and titular Prince of Achaea), and his wife Catherine of Geneva.

Her paternal grandparents were Giacomo of Savoy, titular Prince of Achaea, and his second wife Sibylle of Baux. Her maternal grandparents were Amadeus III, Count of Geneva, and Mahaut d'Auvergne. Their claim to the throne of Achaea came from her great-grandfather Philip of Savoy, eldest son of Thomas III of Piedmont and Guia of Burgundy. Philip married Isabella of Villehardouin, Princess of Achaea, and co-reigned with her from 1301 to 1307. They were both deposed by Philip I of Taranto but continued to claim the title. However, Giacomo was a son of Philip by his second wife Catherine de la Tour du Pin and his claim to be the heir of Isabella of Villehardouin was disputed.

== Marriage ==
On 17 January 1403, Margaret married Theodore II, Marquess of Montferrat, a member of the Palaiologos dynasty and male-line descendant of Andronikos II Palaiologos. Theodore was the widower of Jeanne of Bar, daughter of Robert I, Duke of Bar, and Marie Valois. Her piety increased after she heard the preaching of Vincent Ferrer, who spent several months in Montferrat. This marriage lasted for fifteen years but was childless. Theodore died in 1418.

== Monastic life ==
When she was left a widow, she decided to abandon the world. Leaving the direction of the affairs of the marquisate to Jean-Jacques, the son of her husband by his first marriage, she retired to Alba where she joined the Third Order of St. Dominic.

A little later, Filippo Maria Visconti, Duke of Milan, asked her hand in marriage and begged Pope Martin V to relieve her of her vow. But Margaret opposed a formal refusal to this request and with several young women of rank, she founded a monastery and placed it under the rule of the order of St. Dominic. Redoubling her mortifications she remained a model of piety and died at Alba, 23 November 1464.

== Veneration ==
On 13 December 1464, her remains were placed in a simple tomb; in 1481 they were transferred to a different and much more beautiful sepulchre built in her monastery at the expense of William VIII of Montferrat. They are presently held in the church of Santa Maria Maddalena, Alba.

Four noble beati of the Savoy family are depicted on the vault of a bay in the south aisle of the church of San Michele in Pavia. Margaret is shown dressed as a nun holding three arrows.
