= Aymon III of Geneva =

Aymon III or Aimon III (died 30/31 August 1367), a soldier, statesman and Crusader, was the twelfth Count of Geneva between January 1367 and his death seven months thence. He was the eldest son and successor of Amadeus III and Mahaut d'Auvergne. He pursued a policy of alliance and cooperation with the House of Savoy begun by his father. By all contemporary accounts, he was "handsome [and] possessed great charm of person and of manner."

== Youth of soldiering ==
During his youth, while still only heir to Geneva, Aymon was frequently in the entourage of his first cousin once removed, Count Amadeus VI of Savoy. On 20 October 1361 Aymon was with his cousin's army at the castle of Lanzo in Italy when they were ambushed by some members of an English “great company”. Aymon was among those captured and forced to pay a ransom for his freedom. Aymon later accompanied Amadeus to Avignon, then the residence of the Popes, and stayed at an inn under "the sign of the Fleurs-de-Lys and the Stag" (signum Florum Lilii et Cervi) beside the hostelry of Saint-Georges between 2/3 and 13 December 1362. The purpose of the trip to Avignon was for Amadeus to confer with King John II of France and to plan a punitive campaign against the great companies ravaging southeastern France and Italy, but Pope Urban V envisaged a new crusade against the Ottoman Turks and sought to bring them into a great anti-Turkish alliance. In the summer of 1363 Aymon took part in Amadeus' campaign to force the Margrave Frederick II of Saluzzo into submission.

== Marriage proposals ==
With the help of a faction at the Neapolitan royal court, Aymon made a bid to marry Joanna, Duchess of Durazzo, a niece of the powerful Queen Joanna I of Naples. This faction persuaded the duchess that Aymon was a superior suitor to the one proposed by the queen, Frederick II of Sicily, to whom a marriage would have a meant a rapprochement between the Neapolitan and Sicilian kingdoms, and that he was "more beautiful" (pulcrior) than Louis of Navarre, another suitor and the one Joanna eventually married. When Joanna finally met Aymon, she immediately fell in love. Among the courtiers who persuaded the young Joanna to refuse to marry Frederick in favour of Aymon was the latter's uncle, Cardinal Guy of Boulogne. He and Joanna's great uncle Elias Talleyrand were opposing candidates for the Papacy in 1362, and the latter made several attempts to frustrate Aymon's marriage to Joanna. Guy's proposed marriage was, however, deeply opposed by the dominant court faction and the populace generally, as it was thought it would jeopardise a final peace with Sicily. The proposed marriage to Joanna fell through, as did her proposed union with Frederick. In his will Aymon arranged the repayment of a debt of 1,400 ducats to Pierre d'Ameil, who as Archbishop of Naples had supported his project, and who had become Archbishop of Embrun as a reward from Aimon's brother, the Antipope Clement VII. Piere d'Ameil's letters, many containing coded passages, are the principal source for Aimon and Joanna's romance.

On 23 May 1366, shortly before leaving on Crusade, Aymon made a written agreement to marry Margaret, eldest daughter of the late Henri de Joinville, Count of Vaudémont, but the marriage never took place because of his death.

== Crusade and death ==
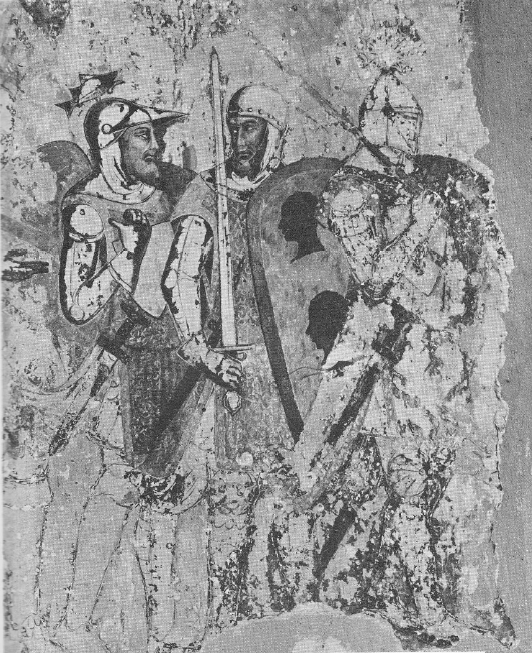
Savoyard crusaders from a contemporary fresco in the Sienese style. The one on the left is Amadeus; one of the others could be Aymon.

Although in 1364, when the Order of the Collar was formed with Amadeus III of Geneva as a member, the count made a promise to go on the crusade, he was unable to fulfill it personally due to ill health, and sent his son Aymon in his place. Aymon was thus the leader of the Genevan contingent on the Savoyard crusade that departed in 1366. He joined Amadeus of Savoy's army at Venice in June that year, along with some mercenary companies and a host of Burgundians. The crusader fleet totalled some fifteen vessels, including six Venetian galleys. Aymon, "the lord of Geneva" (monsieur de Genève), was named "admiral" of one of the galleys. On 3 January 1366 Amadeus had made up his will in case of his death overseas, naming as his heirs general first his son (and his issue) and then his second cousin's younger children, Amadeus and Louis, and finally to Aymon of Geneva on the condition that he adopt the name and arms of the house of Savoy. This will never went into effect, since Amadeus returned alive, and Aymon predeceased him anyway.

The crusade was not ultimately successful in dislodging the Turks from Europe, but it did remove them from Gallipoli and free the Emperor John V Palaiologos from the Bulgars. Aymon, "[having] distinguished himself by his bravery", returned with the Crusade to Venice on 29 July 1367. There he remained for two weeks, possibly ill or wounded. He passed through Padua and Pavia on his return trip to Geneva, where his father had died in January. At Pavia Aymon was received by Galeazzo II Visconti, who loaned him money, on or near 20 August. There he fell ill and dictated his will to a notary in his room in the castle. His will is dated 30 August, and he died that day or the next, leaving the county to his brother Amadeus IV. He was buried beside his father in the chapel of the church of Notre-Dame de Liesse at Annecy. News of his death reached Amadeus of Savoy at Venice on 6 September, and the community of Annecy by 9 September.

== Bibliography ==
- Eugene L. Cox. The Eagles of Savoy: The House of Savoy in Thirteenth-Century Europe. Princeton, New Jersey: Princeton University Press, 1974.
- Pietro Fedele. "L'amore di Giovanna di Durazzo per Aimone III di Ginevra." Miscellanea di Studi Storici in Onore di Antonio Manno, 11 (Turin–Milan–Rome, 1912), 635–53.
- Dino Muratore. "Aimon III, Comte de Genevois: Sa participation à l'expédition du Comte Vert en Orient: Son testament, sa mort." Revue Savoisienne, 47 (Annecy, 1906), 137–45, 208–17.
- Kenneth M. Setton. "Archbishop Pierre d'Ameil in Naples and the Affair of Aimon III of Geneva (1363–1364)." Speculum, 28:4 (1953), 643–91.

Preceded by Amadeus III of Geneva	Count of Geneva; 1367–1367	Succeeded by Amadeus IV of Geneva
