= Philip of Savoy =

Philip of Savoy may refer to:

- Philip I, Count of Savoy (1207–1285), Count of Savoy 1268-1285
- Philip I of Piedmont (1278–1334)
- Philip II of Piedmont (1340-1368)
- Philip of Savoy, Count of Genève (1417–1444), son of Antipope Felix V and Mary of Burgundy, Duchess of Savoy
- Philip II, Duke of Savoy (1438-1497), Duke of Savoy 1496-1497
