= 1367 =

1367 in various calendars
- Gregorian calendar: 1367; MCCCLXVII
- Ab urbe condita: 2120
- Armenian calendar: 816; ԹՎ ՊԺԶ
- Assyrian calendar: 6117
- Balinese saka calendar: 1288–1289
- Bengali calendar: 773–774
- Berber calendar: 2317
- English Regnal year: 40 Edw. 3 – 41 Edw. 3
- Buddhist calendar: 1911
- Burmese calendar: 729
- Byzantine calendar: 6875–6876
- Chinese calendar: 丙午年 (Fire Horse); 4064 or 3857 — to — 丁未年 (Fire Goat); 4065 or 3858
- Coptic calendar: 1083–1084
- Discordian calendar: 2533
- Ethiopian calendar: 1359–1360
- Hebrew calendar: 5127–5128
- Hindu calendars
- Vikram Samvat: 1423–1424
- Shaka Samvat: 1288–1289
- Kali Yuga: 4467–4468
- Holocene calendar: 11367
- Igbo calendar: 367–368
- Iranian calendar: 745–746
- Islamic calendar: 768–769
- Japanese calendar: Jōji 6 (貞治６年)
- Javanese calendar: 1280–1281
- Julian calendar: 1367; MCCCLXVII
- Korean calendar: 3700
- Minguo calendar: 545 before ROC 民前545年
- Nanakshahi calendar: −101
- Thai solar calendar: 1909–1910
- Tibetan calendar: མེ་ཕོ་རྟ་ལོ་ (male Fire-Horse); 1493 or 1112 or 340 — to — མེ་མོ་ལུག་ལོ་ (female Fire-Sheep); 1494 or 1113 or 341

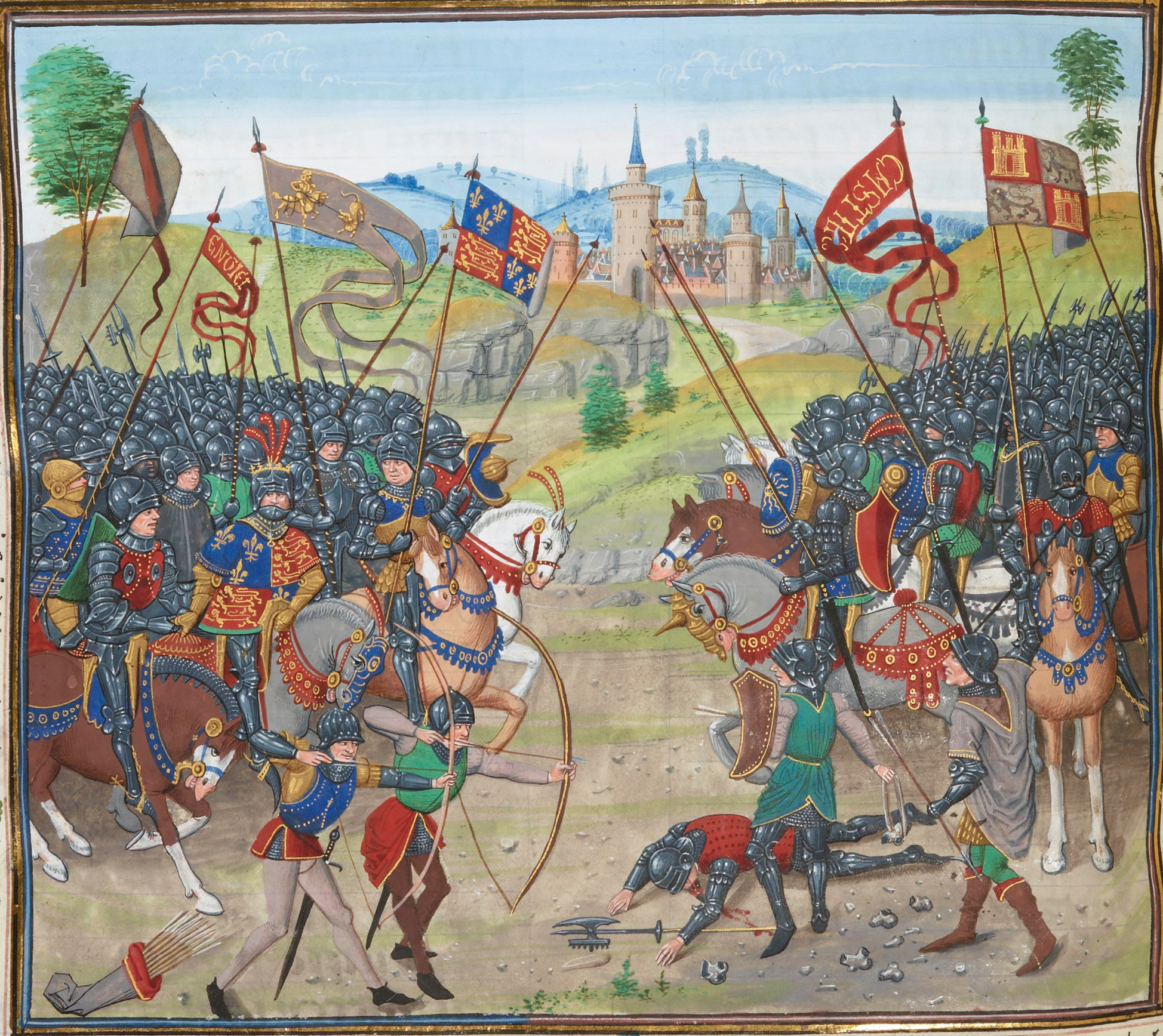
April 3: King Pedro of Castile defeats his half-brother, King Enrique at Najera.

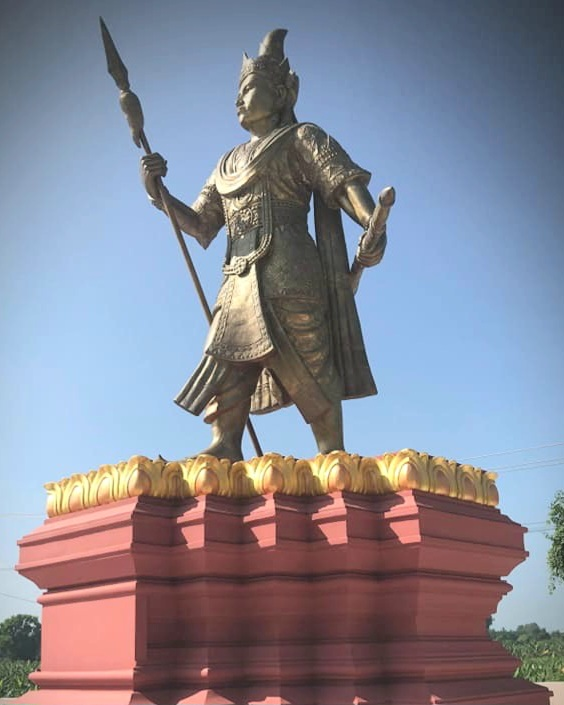
September 3: Thado Minbya, Burmese King of Ava, dies from smallpox after massive reform of his kingdom.

Year 1367 (MCCCLXVII) was a common year starting on Friday of the Julian calendar.

== Events ==
=== January–March ===
- January 18 – Fernando the Handsome becomes King of Portugal after the death of his father, King Pedro the Avenger.
- January 29 – At Chur in what is now the Swiss Canton of Raetia, the League of God's House is founded in the Old Swiss Confederacy as an agreement between nine communities to come to each other's aid in the event of a crisis.
- February 28 – King Enrique II of Castile sends a letter of challenge to Edward, the Black Prince of England, who has already crossed the Pyrenees into Spain with 27,000 troops, daring him to help King Pedro to reclaim the Castilian throne, prompting Edward to organize an army and invade Spain.
- March 19 – The Battle of Inglesmendi is fought in the Crown of Castile (now in Spain) by English troops led by Edward the Black Prince and supporters of the recently deposed King Pedro of Castile who are seeking to restore Pedro to the Castilian throne, against the supporters of the reigning King Enrique II. The knight William Felton is killed and his brother Thomas Felton is taken prisoner of war.
- March 29 – (14th waning of Tagu 728 ME) In what is now Myanmar, Pyanchi becomes the King of Toungoo upon the death of his father, King Theingaba.

=== April–June ===
- April 3 – Battle of Nájera: Pedro of Castile is restored as King of Castile (in modern-day Spain) after defeating his half-brother, King Enrique the Fratricidal. Pedro is aided in the battle by the English under Edward the Black Prince, and Henry by the French.
- April 24 – Otto I, "the Evil", becomes Duke of the independent city of Göttingen (in modern-day Germany) on the death of his father, Ernst I.
- May 2 – At Burgos in Spain, Edward the Black Prince of England attempts to get himself and his soldiers paid by King Pedro of Castile for their services at the battle of Najera, but receives instead a renewal of a bond to secure the debt owed.
- May 20 – John of Ashwell becomes the new Attorney General for England and Wales upon the departure of Thomas of Shardelow.
- May 31 – King Robert III of Scotland names his son Prince James of Stewart as the Earl of Atholl, a title traditionally given to the heir of the Scottish throne.
- June 20 – The author Geoffrey Chaucer is appointed by King Edward III of England as a valet de chambre as a means of receiving a regular income while pursuing his writing. By 1372, Chaucer delivers his first epic poem, The Book of the Duchess, in honor of Duchess Blanche of Lancaster.

=== July–September ===
- July 9 – Guy de Blois, Count of Sissons, held hostage by Enguerrand VII de Coucy, Earl of Bedford, is forced to surrender Soissons to Bedford in return for his freedom.
- July 19 – King Charles V of France issues a royal edict ordering the bonne villes (defined as "the French town that enjoyed especial royal favour") to improve their defenses by improving town walls, towers and gateways.
- July 26 – At Avignon, Pope Urban V learns of a possible invasion of France by John of Gaunt and his intention to capture Provence, and writes to England's King Edward III to take steps to prevent it.
- August 31 – In Switzerland, Amadeus IV, Count of Geneva become the new Count of Geneva when his brother, Aymon III, dies of battle wounds after only seven months after taking office on January 18.
- September 5 – In what is now Myanmar, Swa Saw Ke becomes the new King of Ava two days after the death of his brother-in-law, King Thado Minbya, and following the decision of Thilawa of Yamethin to reject the offer of the throne.
- September 17 – One month before his appointment as Bishop of Winchester, William of Wykeham is confirmed as the Chancellor of England following his appointment by King Edward III.
- September 28 – The Battle of Tripoli is fought in Lebanon as the Muslim Mamluk Syrian army, led by the Emir Idmor, repels Christian invaders led by King Peter of Cyprus

=== October–December ===
- October 1 – Red Turban Rebellions: Zhu Yuanzhang takes Suzhou from Zhang Shicheng, who unsuccessfully attempts suicide before being captured and taken to Nanjing, where he dies.
- October 16 – Pope Urban V makes the first attempt to move the Papacy back to Rome from Avignon. This move is reversed in 1370, when he is forced to return to Avignon, and shortly afterwards dies.
- November 19 – In Germany, the Kölner Konföderation is founded by eight German members of the Hanseatic League (Lübeck, Rostock, Stralsund, Wismar, Kulm and Thorn, and five non-League Dutch cities (Amsterdam, Brielle, Harderwijk,Elbing and Kampen) to fight against the Kingdom of Denmark, whose ruler King Valdemar IV, has been seizing land to expand the territory owned by the Danish crown.
- December 28 – During the Red Turban Rebellions, Hu Mei captures Shaowu, while Xu Da and Chang Yuchun capture Jinan, bringing both under the Hongwu Emperor Zhu Yuanzhang's control.

=== Date unknown ===
- Winter – Construction of a stone Moscow Kremlin Wall around the city is begun to resist invasion by the Grand Duchy of Lithuania.
- Petru I succeeds his grandfather Bogdan I as voivode (ruler) of Moldavia.
- The first university in Pécs, Hungary, is founded by King Louis I.

== Births ==
- January 6 – King Richard II of England (d. 1400)
- March 22 or 1368 – Thomas de Mowbray, 1st Duke of Norfolk, English politician (d. 1399)
- June 13 – King Taejong of Joseon, Korean king (d. 1422)
- date unknown – Michael de la Pole, 2nd Earl of Suffolk, English politician (d. 1415)
- probable – Mary of Enghien, queen consort of Naples (d. 1446)

== Deaths ==
- January – Han Lin'er, Chinese rebel leader, emperor of Han Song (b. 1339)
- January 9 – Giulia della Rena, Italian saint (b. 1319)
- January 18 – King Peter I of Portugal (b. 1320)
- April 13 – John Tiptoft, 2nd Baron Tibetot (b. 1313)
- August 23 – Gil Álvarez Carrillo de Albornoz, Spanish cardinal (b. 1310)
- September 25 – Jakushitsu Genkō, Japanese poet (b. 1290)
- December 28 – Ashikaga Yoshiakira, Japanese shōgun (b. 1330)
- date unknown
  - Bogdan I of Moldavia
  - Zhang Shicheng, Chinese rebel leader, King of Wu (b. 1321)

== Bibliography ==
- Twitchett, Denis (1998), The Cambridge History of China Volume 7 The Ming Dynasty, 1368—1644, Part I, Cambridge University Press
