= Amadeus III =

Amadeus III may refer to:

- Amadeus III, Count of Savoy (1095–1148), Count of Savoy and Crusader
- Amadeus III of Geneva (1311–1367), Count of Geneva
