= Amadeus, Prince of Achaea =

Prince of Achaea (1363–1402)

Amadeus or Amedeo of Savoy (1363 – 7 May 1402) was the son of James of Piedmont and his third wife Marguerite de Beaujeu. By James' will of 16 May 1366, he was declared his firstborn (his elder half-brother was considered a traitor by their father) and heir. In 1367, he succeeded his father in his titles of Lord of Piedmont and claimed the title of the Prince of Achaea. He was also the lord of Pinerolo.

Amadeo was taken from his mother's guardianship at a young age to live with Amadeo VI of Savoy at Chambéry. He returned to Piedmont in 1378 when he came of age. In 1380, he received papal dispensation to marry within the third or fourth degree, though prohibited otherwise by the Church. Amadeo married Catherine, daughter of Amadeus III of Geneva, on 7 September that year.

Nerio I Acciaioli, Duke of Athens, had been a one-time employer of the Navarrese Company, but having been imprisoned at Listrina for a year from September 1389 by the Navarrese master Pedro de San Superano, he abandoned his erstwhile allies and began talks with Amadeo, who had written letters of condolence to Nerio's relatives. On 29 December 1391, Amadeo's representatives met with Nerio in the palace chapel on the Acropolis and signed a pact against the Navarrese then controlling the Morea. Nerio agreed to recognise Amadeo as Prince of Achaea and his legal suzerain for the lordship of Corinth and the duchy of Athens and Neopatria. Meanwhile, Amadeo had also been negotiating with Pedro and he had secured Navarrese recognition of his title in return for the confirmation of their vast holdings. Venice had also made an accord with Amadeo and were ready to transport himself and his army by sea to Greece in return for his aid in reconquering Argos from the Despotate of Morea. Amadeo was in contact with the Despot Thomas Palaeologus. Finally, a roll of all the Frankish vassals of the prince of Achaea was made and sent to Amadeo, but all for naught. Amadeo did go to Genoa to embark for the east, but never did set foot in Greece, for Amadeo VI died suddenly at that time.

With his wife, Amadeo had four daughters:

- Margaret (died 23 November 1464), married Theodore II of Montferrat, beatified by Pope Clement IX in 1669
- Bona (21 June 1390 – after 1392), probably died young
- Matilda (died 14 May 1438), married Louis III of the Rhine
- Catherine (born 1400)

He was succeeded by his brother Louis.
