= Amadeus IV =

Amadeus IV may refer to:

- Amadeus IV, Count of Savoy (1197–1253)
- Amadeus IV of Geneva (died 1369), Count of Geneva
