= Peter of Geneva =

Peter (died 1392) was the fourth of five sons of Count Amadeus III of Geneva and succeeded his brother John I as Count of Geneva in 1370. When he died without a son to succeed him in 1392, the county passed to the fifth of the brothers, then Antipope Clement VII.

Peter led a contingent of Genevans in an invasion of the Kingdom of Naples in 1382. The invasion was led by his lord, Amadeus VI, Count of Savoy, and by Louis I, Duke of Anjou, the adopted son and heir of the imprisoned Queen Joan I of Naples, all supporters of his brother's claim to the papal throne. He was present at the deathbed of Amadeus at Castropignano on 1 March 1383. The Savoyard treasurer Pierre Voisin, in his final account, described Amadeus' death as occurring "on [the] first day of the month of March ... at about midnight, in the presence of Louis, duke of Calabria and Anjou, Lord Pierre, count of Geneva. . ."

Around 1377 Peter was employing a Jewish physician, Isaac de Portis.

== Notes ==
Preceded by John I of Geneva	Count of Geneva; 1370–1392	Succeeded by Robert of Geneva as Antipope Clement VII
