= Catherine de la Tour du Pin =

Catherine de la Tour du Pin (about 1290 - 1337), was the tenth child of Humbert I of Viennois and Anne d'Albon. She married Philip I of Piedmont. They had:

- James of Piedmont
- Eleanor married Manfred V of Saluzzo
- Beatrice married Humbert de Thoire-Villars
- Agnes married John de la Chambre
- Joan married Aimée de Poitiers
- Amadeus, Bishop of Maurienne from 1349-1376
- Thomas, Bishop of Turin from 1351-1360
- Edward, Archbishop of Tarentaise from 1386-1395
- Aimone, married Mencia de Ceva, died 1398, was in Savoyard crusade
- Isabelle, married John, viscount of Maurienne

== Sources ==
- Cox, Eugene L. (1967). The Green Count of Savoy. Princeton, New Jersey: Princeton University Press. LCCN 67-11030.
