= Margherita di Savoia =

Margherita di Savoia may refer to:

== Places ==
Italy

- Margherita di Savoia, Apulia, a comune in the Province of Barletta-Andria-Trani

== People ==
- The Blessed Margaret of Savoy (1390–1464), marchioness of Montferrat
- Margherita of Savoy (1851-1926), queen consort of King Umberto I of Italy

== See also ==
- Margaret of Savoy (disambiguation)
