= Margaret of Savoy =

Margaret of Savoy may refer to:

- Margaret of Savoy (d. 1254), daughter of Amadeus IV, Count of Savoy, and Anne of Burgundy; wife firstly of Boniface II, Marquess of Montferrat; and secondly of Aymar III, Count of Valentinois
- The Blessed Margaret of Savoy (1390–1464), Marchioness of Montferrat, and a Dominican Sister
- Margaret of Savoy, Duchess of Anjou, wife of Louis III, titular king of Naples; Louis IV, Elector Palatine; and Ulrich V, Count of Württemberg; mother of Philip, Elector Palatine
- Margaret of Savoy, Countess of Saint-Pol (1439–1483), daughter of Louis, Duke of Savoy, and wife firstly of John IV, Marquess of Montferrat, and secondly of Peter II, Count of Saint-Pol
- Margaret of Austria, Duchess of Savoy (1480–1530), daughter of Maximilian I, Holy Roman Emperor, and Mary of Burgundy; wife firstly of John of Castile and secondly of Philibert of Savoy
- Margaret of France, Duchess of Berry (1523–1574), daughter of Francis I, King of France, and Claude, Duchess of Brittany; wife of Emmanuel Philibert, Duke of Savoy
- Margaret of Savoy, Vicereine of Portugal (1589–1655), Duchess of Mantua and Montferrat and last Vicereine of Portugal
- Margherita of Savoy (1851–1926), queen consort of Italy, wife of Umberto I

== See also ==
- Margherita di Savoia (disambiguation)
