= Savoyard crusade =

14th-century military expedition

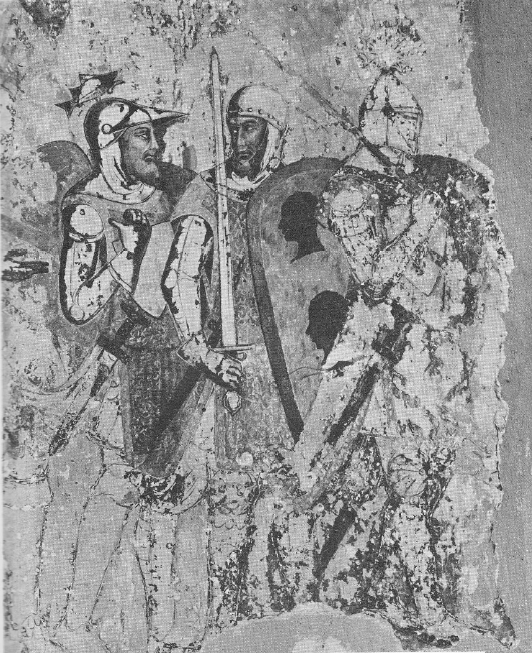
Fresco on the walls of a hall in the episcopal palace at Colle Val d'Elsa, depicting the departure of barons on a crusade. It probably represents the crusade of 1366, since the knight on the left is Amadeus VI. "The fresco is usually ascribed to the Sienese school and dated in the last half of the fourteenth century."

The Savoyard crusade was a crusading expedition to the Balkans in 1366–67. It was born out of the same planning that led to the Alexandrian Crusade and was the brainchild of Pope Urban V. It was led by Count Amadeus VI of Savoy and directed against the growing Ottoman Empire in eastern Europe. Although intended as a collaboration with the Kingdom of Hungary and the Byzantine Empire, the crusade was diverted from its main purpose to attack the Second Bulgarian Empire. There the crusaders made small gains that they handed over to the Byzantines. It did take back some territory from the Ottomans in the vicinity of Constantinople and on Gallipoli but all these conquests were reversed within less than five years by the Turks.

Noting the greater attention paid to Bulgaria than to the Turks, historian Nicolae Iorga argued "it was not even a crusade ... this expedition that better resembled an escapade." (Note: "Ce n'était pas même une croisade ... cette expédition, qui ressembla beaucoup à une équipée") Still, the taking of Gallipoli, according to Oskar Halecki, was "the first success achieved by the Christians in their struggle for the defense of Europe, and at the same time the last great Christian victory [over the Turks] during all the fourteenth century."

== Preparations ==
=== Vows ===
On 31 March 1363, Good Friday, at Papal Avignon, the kings of France and Cyprus, John II and Peter I, took crusading vows to go to the Holy Land and received from Pope Urban V the sign of the cross (signum crucis) to sew on their garments as a sign of their vow. This was the beginning of the Savoyard crusade, although John II would never fulfill his vow personally and Peter I did not ultimately cooperate with the count of Savoy in the venture. The latter did not make his crusading vow, also before Urban V, until probably 19 January 1364, when a council of regional magnates was held at Avignon to form a league (colligatio) against the marauding free companies. This was certainly the occasion when the pope bestowed on Amadeus the Golden Rose, and the count founded the chivalric Order of the Collar to replace his earlier, and probably defunct, Order of the Black Swan. The original members of the Order of the Collar were devoted followers, and often relatives, of Amadeus and all were probably pledged to accompany him on crusade. In the event, all but two who could not go for reasons of health, travelled east. The Order, like the crusade, was dedicated to the Virgin Mary. The deadline established for the departure of the crusade was 1 March 1365, although the pope expected both Peter of Cyprus and Amadeus of Savoy to depart earlier. The deadline was met by nobody, although on 27 June the king of Cyprus left Venice on the Alexandrian Crusade.

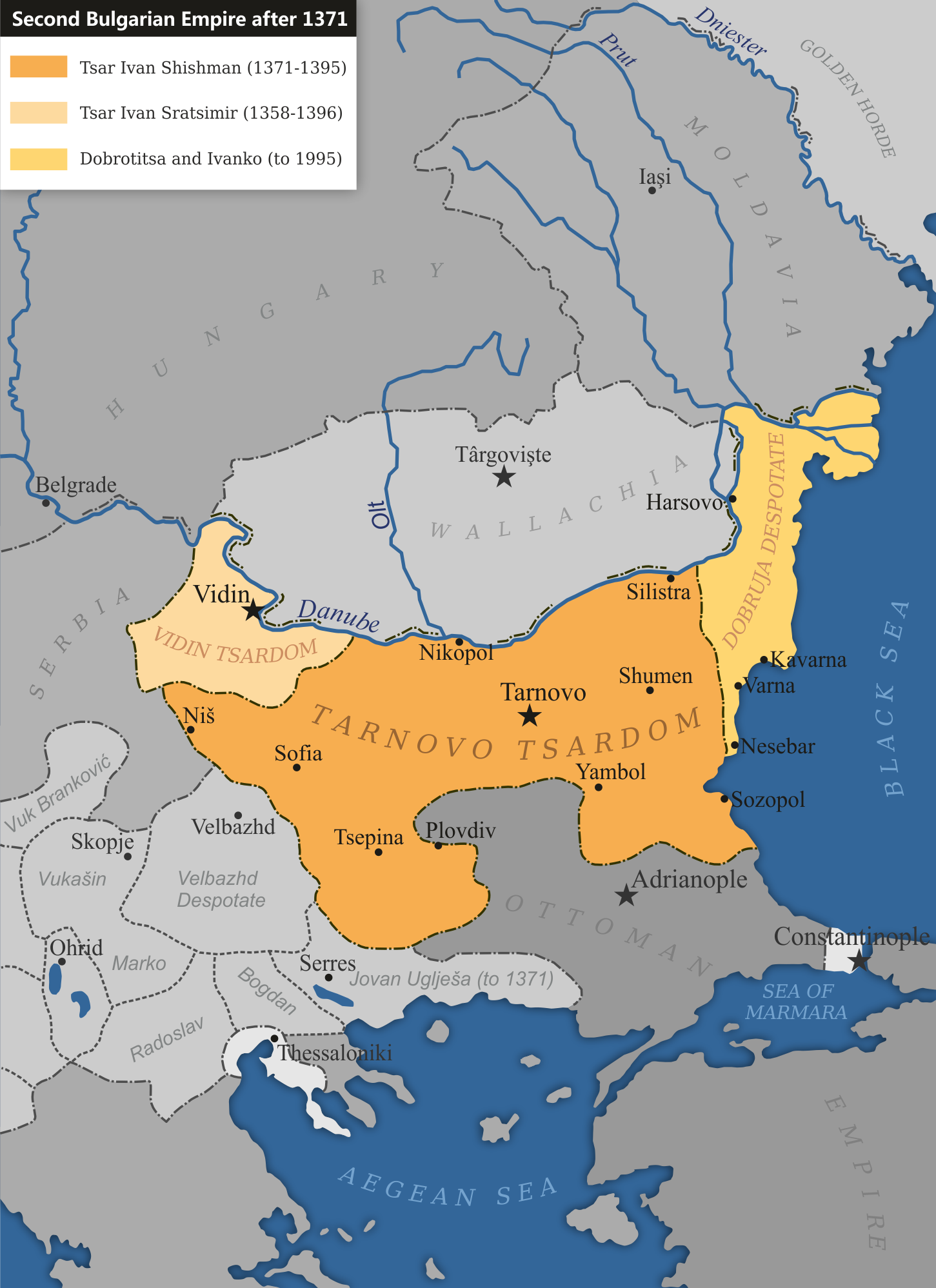
Map of the divisions of Bulgaria at the time of the crusade

In May 1363, Urban had made an appeal to Louis I of Hungary for a crusade against the Turks, and the king spent the winter of 1364–65 preparing an army for a major offensive designed to push the Turks out of Europe. In January 1365, as reported at Venice, ten galleys were being gathered in Provence for Louis's use, and Louis had issued a call for support in Zadar (Zara) and Dalmatia. In the spring he invaded, not Turkish Europe (Rumelia), but rather the north of Bulgaria, then ruled by the tsar's second son, Sratsimir. He conquered and occupied Vidin, and took Sratsimir captive back to Hungary. His expedition was thus completed in time for him to cooperate with Amadeus in a joint attack on the Turks in the spring of 1366.

=== Finances ===
On 1 April 1364 Urban V made a serious effort to fund Amadeus's expedition with a series of seven bulls granting him various new sources of income. All confiscated "ill-gotten gains" (male acquisita) from theft, rapine or usury which could not be restituted (to the victims) were to be used for the next six years for the crusade. Further, "all the hitherto unspent legacies, gifts, confiscations, fines, and penances which had been bequeathed, given, assigned, or levied pro dicto passagio et Terre Sancte subsidio [for the passage to the Holy Land and its welfare] in the county of Savoy and its dependencies for the preceding twelve years and for the next six" were assigned to the count for his expedition. Finally, the church was to pay a tithe (tenth) of its tithes to the count for the crusade, excepting those priests who had received permission to go on the journey themselves.

=== Army and fleet ===
In early 1366 Amadeus was in Savoy assembling his army. More than half of the army consisted of the hereditary vassals of the count of Savoy, and almost no family in his dominions was unrepresented. His half-brother Ogier and his nephew Humbert, son of his half-brother Humbert, both joined. Aymon, younger brother of James of Piedmont, and Amadeus's two illegitimate sons, both named Antoine, participated. (Note: Distinguished as Antonius, bastardus de Sabaudie, junior and senior) Among crusaders were the English knight Richard Musard, the count's cousin Guillaume de Grandson, Aymond, heir of Amadeus III of Geneva, who was too ill to fulfill his vow, and Louis de Beaujeu, sire d'Alloignet, who was taking the place of Antoine de Beaujeu. By the time it had reached Venice, this army had been organised into three batailles under the oversight of the marshal Gaspard de Montmayeur: the first was led by Amadeus, Gaspard, Aymard de Clermont, and the brothers Guy and Jean de Vienne; the second by Étienne de la Baume, the sire de Basset (probably Ralph Basset), and the sire de Saint-Amour; the third and largest, the grosse bataille, was commanded by Guillaume de Grandson, Antelme d'Urtières, and Florimont de Lesparre, and included the count's relatives.

Seeing that the Alexandrian Crusade had harmed its commercial relations with the Islamic powers, the Republic of Venice was disinclined to participate in the projected crusade or to provide it transportation east. A letter from Pope Urban in March 1365 did not convince them otherwise, but an embassy from Amadeus procured a promise of two galleys in light of the count's request for five (and two fustes). Urban, the architect of the crusade, negotiated with Genoa and Marseille to procure ships, but the promise of transportation from the Holy Roman Emperor Charles IV was never fulfilled. A large number of mercenaries from the free companies had joined the crusade and assembled at Tournus under Arnaud de Cervole, but when Cervole was assassinated on 25 May 1366 near Mâcon, the mercenaries abandoned the expedition.

== Passage to the East ==
=== Savoy to Venice ===
On 3 January 1366 at Le Bourget-du-Lac, Amadeus, in preparation for his departure, named his wife, Bonne de Bourbon, regent in his absence, to be assisted by a council of seven, at least two of whom had always to be witness to her orders to make them effective. Perhaps as a protest at the lateness of these efforts, or at the proposed destination, which was not the Holy Land, on 6 January Pope Urban revoked the bulls of 1 April 1364, thus cutting off a major source of funding. Although Amadeus went to Avignon to protest, and apparently received a Papal blessing for his adventure, the bulls remained revoked. The count was forced to demand a general subsidy (tax) for the viagio ultramarino (voyage overseas), but this remained uncollected until 1368 and the cost of naval transportation had to be met by loans (10,000 florins) from some banks of Lyon and the pawning of the family silver. On 8 February Amadeus began the voyage over land to Venice.

Amadeus had reached Rivoli by 15 February, and Pavia, where his brother-in-law Galeazzo II Visconti ruled, by mid-March. He then turned around and visited Saint-Jean-de-Maurienne before returning to Pavia by late May, there to be godfather at the baptism of his nephew Giangaleazzo's infant son Giangaleazzo II. His sister, the elder Giangaleazzo's mother, Bianca, made a donation to his war chest at this time, and his brother-in-law made loans of both money and men: 25,000 florins and twenty-five men-at-arms, six hundred brigandi (mercenaries) and sixteen conestabiles under his bastard son Cesare, to be paid at Galeazzo's expense for the first six months. Half of the crusading host under Étienne de la Baume went from there to Genoa to embark on the fleet awaiting it and take it to Venice. On 1 June the rest of the army under Amadeus left for Padua, where the ruling family, the Carraresi, offered him the use of their palace in Venice. On 8 June 1366 Amadeus and the main army arrived at Venice, where the Venetians, informed that the crusade was not directed at the Holy Land, offered more assistance, including ships and men if the crusaders would take Tenedos from the Genoese (which they would not). The departure of the fleet took place around 21 June.

=== Venice to Gallipoli ===
The fleet sailed down the Dalmatian coast, stopping at Pula (Pola), Dubrovnik (Ragusa), Corfu and finally Koroni (Coron), which was under Venetian control. There Amadeus learned that Marie de Bourbon, daughter of Duke Louis I of Bourbon, whose niece Bonne was Amadeus's wife, was being besieged in her castle at Pylos (Navarino) by the Archbishop of Patras, Angelo Acciaioli, who had seized her lands on behalf of Philip of Taranto, her brother-in-law, who disputed the claim to the Principality of Achaea by Marie on behalf of her young son, Hugh, whose father was the late Robert of Taranto. Early in 1366 Marie and Hugh had raised an army of mercenaries from Cyprus and Provence, and had begun to reclaim the territory of the principality she claimed. During negotiations, Marie's castellan of Pylos, Guillaume de Talay, had arrested Simone del Poggio, the bailiff of Philip of Taranto, and imprisoned him in Pylos's dungeons. By the time of Amadeus's arrival, a counter-offensive led by the archbishop had cornered Marie and Hugh in Pylos. The count of Savoy was requested to arbitrate. He determined that Marie should renounce any claim over Patras, and that the archbishop should evacuate his troops from southern Achaea and leave Marie in peaceful possession of it. The "damsel in distress" rescued and "the rights of the church" defended, Amadeus returned to his ships. (Note: Per Cox (1967), pp. 213–215, this historical event is essentially garbled in the Gestez et Croniques de la Mayson de Savoye, which call Marie, the "desposte des Inus", a cousine rather than a niece of Bonne. Her castle is "Jungs" on the bay known as "Port de Junch" or "Junke", from the Venetian Zonklon. The count's expense records refer to it as the castrum de Jonc. The Chronique also renders the result as a victory for the archbishop, who "cherished [the count] and praised him greatly and gave him many fine relics." According to Aziz Atiya, The Crusade in the Later Middle Ages (London, 1928), 387, the disputed possessions were at "Zuchio and the castle of Manolada.")

At Koroni, the Venetian fleet, which was being led by Antelme d'Urtières, captain of the count's galley, rendezvoused with the Genoese to form a fleet of fifteen ships under the overall command of the admiral Étienne de la Baume. The army was divided between the galleys on the basis of geography: there was one ship for the men of Bresse (Breysse), another for "the men of Faucigny" (des gens de Foucignie), another for those of Savoy proper (Savoye), etc. All the ships were to sail within sight of each other and none to sail ahead of the count's, fines being prescribed for violations of these commands. Flag signals by day and lanterns by night were used to communicated between ships; attack signals were given by trumpeters on the count's ship. The entire voyage was strictly controlled by the count of Savoy. From Koroni the fleet proceeded to Agios Georgios (San Giorgio d'Albora) on Hydra, thence to Chalcis (Negroponte), and finally Evripos, the last stop before they entered Turkish territory. There they bought clean water, and the count's physician, Gui Albin, purchased saculi pro stomaco, some kind of disinfectant for the stomach.

== Campaigns ==
=== Gallipoli ===
Although the crusaders were hoping for assistance from John V Palaiologos, Byzantine Emperor, the pope had made it dependent on his bringing the Greek Orthodox Church back into communion with the Roman Catholic Church—and under papal supremacy—even though it was the Byzantine empire that the crusade was seeking to relieve from Turkish pressure. The crusaders also expected support from Louis of Hungary, although all that was ever received was two royal squire who served Amadeus "in the Bulgarian provinces" (in partibus Burgarie). In the spring of 1366, John V travelled to the Hungarian court to accept military aid and swear an oath on behalf of himself and his sons to convert to Catholicism. On 1 July Pope Urban had extended to Louis the Crusade indulgence, but on 22 July 1366 a letter from the pope suspended the privileges granted earlier that month for one year, postponing assistance to the Greeks until after their return to the Catholic fold and convincing Louis not to assist the "schismatic", although the pope had not expressly forbid him to. On his return through Bulgaria, so recently attacked by his would-be ally, John found himself trapped, either imprisoned or surrounded by Bulgarian forces, and unable to continue to his own domain, where his son, Andronicus IV, married to Keratsa, daughter of the Bulgarian tsar, had taken control of the government. Amadeus and John V were first cousins, John's mother, Anna, was the sister of Amadeus's father, Aymon.

Apprised of the situation in Bulgaria and of the Turkish positions in Europe, Amadeus led his fleet into the Dardanelles, where it was joined by a flotilla under Francesco I Gattilusio, Prince of Lesbos, and son-in-law of the trapped emperor. The Savoyard chronicles record that they met a detachment of the Byzantine army under the Patriarch of Constantinople. On 22 August 1366, the combined crusader fleet launched an attack on Gelibolu (Gallipoli), the second city of the European Turks. While the army assaulted the walls, the Turks abandoned the city during the night and in the morning the inhabitants opened the gates to the crusaders. The sources shed limited light on this brief episode. According to the count's register, both town and citadel were in Savoyard hands by 26 August. Garrisons and commanders were appointed for each—Giacomo di Luserna for the city and Aimone Michaele for the citadel, with responsibility for not just defending Gelibolu but also for guarding the entrance to the straits. On 27 August a messenger was sent westward with news of the count's "first and most famous victory against the heathen Turks".

The chronicles explain the rapid success by the Turkish retreat, but it is also known that on 12 September 1366, at Beyoğlu (Pera) in Constantinople, the count was preparing the funerals of several of his men killed in the attack on Gelibolu, including Simon de Saint-Amour and Roland de Veissy, both knights of the Collar. The count's bursar, Antoine Barbier, purchased eighteen escutcheons bearing the "device of the Collar" (devisa collarium) for their funeral. Eighty-one wax torches and alms were paid for the burial of Girard Mareschal from Savoy and Jean d'Yverdon from the Vaudois. A storm in the Sea of Marmora prevented the remainder of the crusade from leaving Gelibolu, but by 4 September they had arrived by sea at Constantinople. The fleet landed at Beyoğlu (Pera), the Genoese quarter where most of his men stayed, although some took lodgings in Galata, the borgo de Veneciis (Venetian quarter). Amadeus himself purchased an unfurnished house in the city proper. Besides the cost of furniture and funerals, the count paid his interpreter Paulo three months' wages.

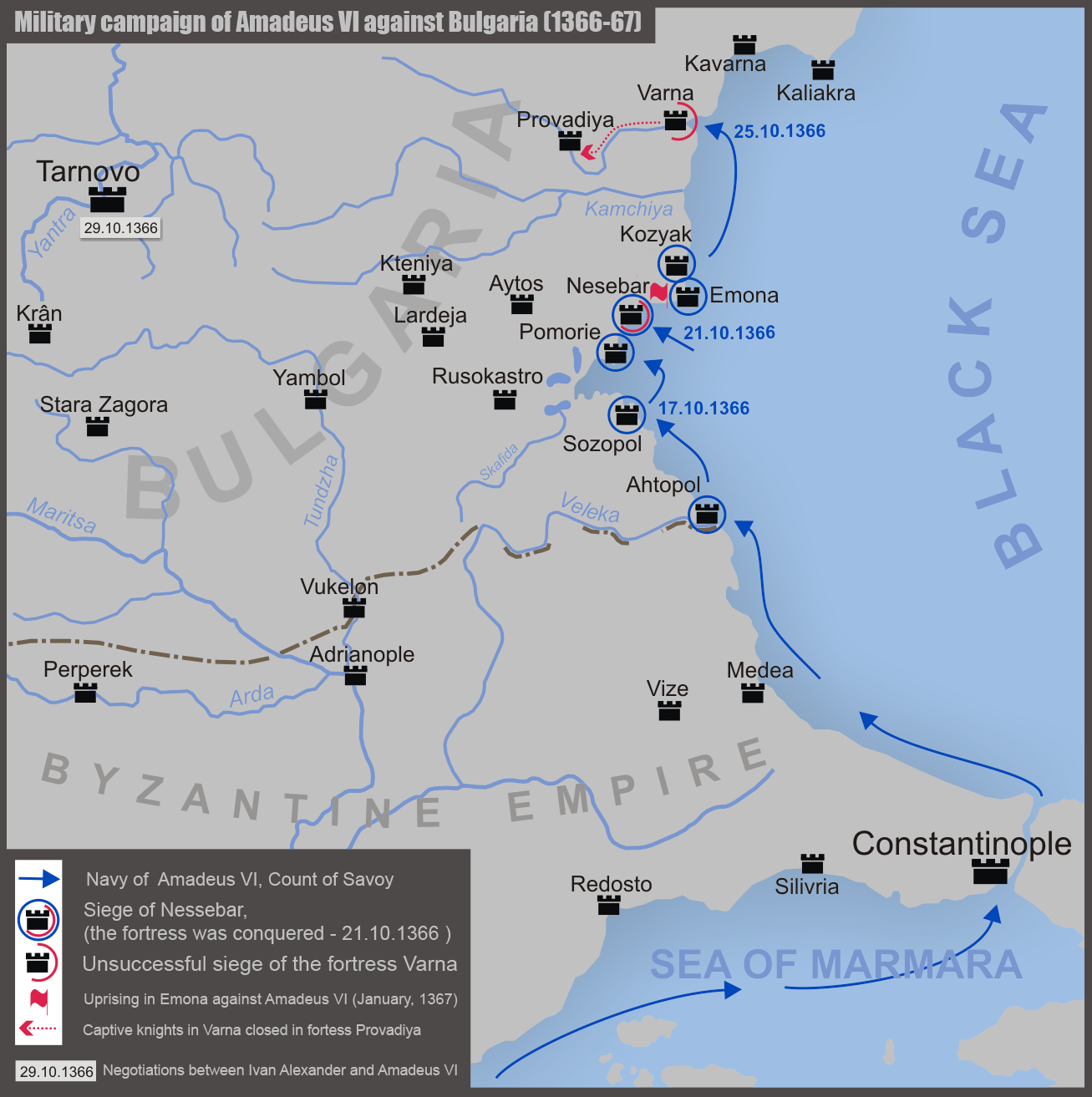
Map of the Bulgarian expedition

=== Bulgaria ===
From Constantinople, Amadeus sent a Savoyard embassy to John V, who was apparently at Vidin. He seems to have asked for armed intervention to free him to return to his capital. His empress, Helena Kantakouzene, offered the count of Savoy money for a military expedition into Bulgaria. Although Amadeus had no warrant from the pope to attack the Bulgarians, fellow Christians albeit schismatics (non-Catholics). Leaving a contingent behind in Constantinople, the count led a fleet up the Black Sea coast of Bulgaria on 4 October. In two days they reached the port of "Lorfenal" (l'Orfenal) and then Sozopolis, which was long supposed to have been in Byzantine hands, but now appears to have belonged to the Bulgarians. No battle took place, and it is not clear if the city surrendered or was simply bypassed. The expense accounts of Amadeus VI show him to have been "at Sozopolis" (apud Tisopuli) for 17–19 October, but he may have only camped outside its walls. He may, however, have captured Burgas. On 20 October 1366 the city of Nesebar (Mesembria) and its citadel were captured. Having put up a stiff resistance that caused the death of many Christian knights and squires, the Mesembrians were put to the sword, women and children not spared, and the city was pillaged. Pomorie, which the Savoyards called Lassillo or l'Assillo (from Axillo, or Anchialus) was next captured, and perhaps also Macropolis (Manchopoly) and Scafida (Stafida), and the Savoyards controlled the Gulf of Burgas.

The coastal region of Bulgaria, modern Dobrudja, was at this time the semi-independent Principality of Karvuna, ruled by Dobrotitsa as a frontier march of the Bulgarian empire. Its chief city, formerly a metropolis, was Varna. On 25 October 1366 the crusaders arrived before Varna, and sent an embassy to the citizens asking them to surrender. They refused, but promised to send their own messengers to Tsar Ivan Shishman, whose capital was at Veliko Tarnovo (Tirnovo), requesting him to allow John V to pass, although Shishman did not control Vidin at the time, which was in the hands of his brother, Ivan Sratsimir. In the meantime, the Varnans supplied the crusading army and several embassies were exchanged between Tarnovo and the count of Savoy's camp. In order to strengthen his bargaining position, Amadeus attacked and captured Emona (Lemona, l'Emona), a fortress on Cape Emine, further south along the coast. After their capitulation the Emonans rose in rebellion and had to be crushed. Establishing a garrison there, Amadeus returned to Varna.

As the truce between Varna and the count of Savoy dragged on, a band of youthful crusaders ventured by sea to take the small castle of "Calocastre" by night. They were discovered by the guards as they tried to scale the walls and massacred. Although expressing disapproval of their independent action, Amadeus led a retaliatory expedition which resulted in the slaughter of the population of Calocastre. Negotiations with the Bulgarians continued into mid-November, and, possibly at the insistence of the tsar, Amadeus raised the siege of Varna and withdrew to Nesebar, leaving a garrison in Emona, before 18 November. On 23 December 1366 Tsar Shishman sent word to Amadeus that the emperor was being permitted to go from Vidin to Kaliakra, in Dobrotitsa's domain. The count sent a welcoming party to await him there, and passed the winter at Nesebar, where he administered the city thoroughly, extracting taxes of all kinds. Early in January 1367 the count moved his court across the gulf to Sozopolis, where the emperor finally arrived on 28 January, without having stopped at Kaliakra.

=== Vicinity of Constantinople ===
Late in January or early in February, the citizens of Emona rebelled. On 15 March 1367, probably after the emperor had left for Constantinople, having promised to defray the cost of Amadeus's expedition to Bulgaria in return for receiving the cities he had conquered, the count went to Nesebar to oversee final preparations for his departure, including the ransom of all his men who by then were still held captive in Bulgarian prisons. By 9 April all had been accomplished and the crusaders were back in Constantinople, where, in the words of the Savoyard chroniclers, "the emperor, in order to receive his cousin the count more highly and honorably, made ready the priests, colleges, and all orders of religion, gentlemen, citizens, merchants, people, women, and children, and [they all] went to the seaside to meet the count, crying 'Long live the count of Savoy, who has delivered Greece from the Turks and the Emperor, our lord, from the hands of the Emperor of Bulgaria'." At Constantinople, John V finally agreed to pay 15,000 florins of the costs of the Bulgarian expedition, although ultimately only about 10,000 were ever received.

Amadeus still intended to wage war against the Turk, but his means to do so had decreased since the capture of Gallipoli. Nevertheless, on 14 May 1367 he took the Turkish castle of Eneacossia on the northern shore of the Marmora, which the Greek historian John Kantakouzenos informs us was the "fortress near Rhegium", modern Küçükçekmece. One of the Savoyard soldiers was rewarded for planting the Savoyard banner atop the tower during the fray. In that same month Amadeus had to rush north to defend Sozopolis from a Turkish assault. On or near 24 May, his men set fire to the Turkish fortress called Caloneyro, probably represented by the Byzantine ruins at Büyükçekmece. Throughout April–May the prime concern of the crusade was paying off the shipowners and raising funds for the return voyage.

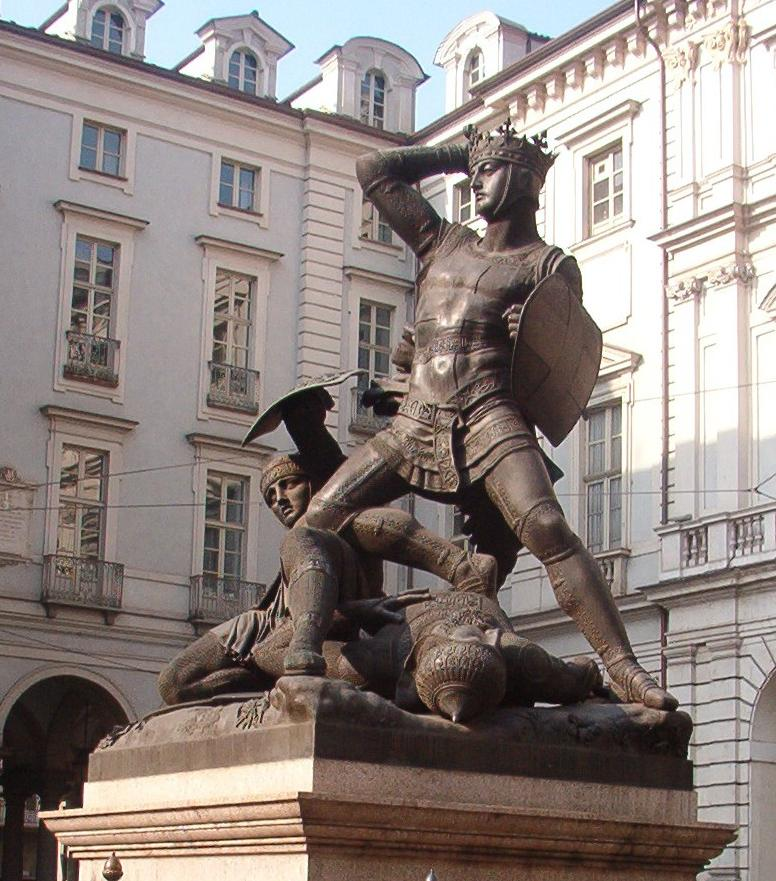
Statue of Amadeus slaying a Turk by Pelagio Palagi, which stands in Turin

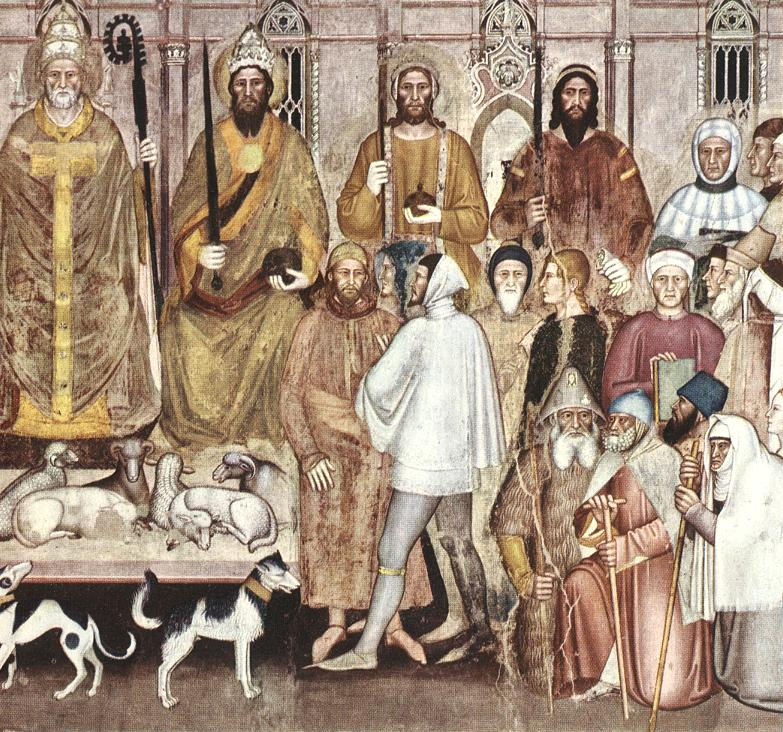
A fresco in the Florentine style by Andrea di Bonaiuto in the Spanish Chapel of the Basilica of Santa Maria Novella shows Amadeus VI (fourth from left in the back row) as a crusader

== Return trip ==
During the remainder of Amadeus's time in Constantinople, he endeavoured without success to negotiate an end to the East–West Schism. Although he had established Paul, Latin Patriarch of Constantinople, at Gelibolu and not at Constantinople—in deference to the Greeks—Paul returned to Italy with the crusade, leaving Constantinople on 9 June 1367. The count of Savoy travelled aboard a new galley that his man Giovanni di Conte purchased at Pera. On 13 June, the crusaders arrived at Gelibolu. Amadeus paid the garrison, and handed the city and citadel over to the Byzantines. By 16 June, the fleet reached Tenedos. Between 20 and 22 June it stayed at Chalcis, where Amadeus paid four gold perperi to two minstrels of Roger de Llúria, vicar-general of the Duchy of Athens, who had come bringing their master's greetings and stayed to entertain for the evening.

At Chalcis, many left the crusade to go to Cyprus and fight under King Peter I, promising more opportunities for fighting infidels (and less fighting schismatic brothers in the faith). The returning crusaders stopped at Methoni (Modon) and Glarentza (Clarencia), arriving at Corfu on 10 July 1367. A week later, they stopped at Dubrovnik and on 29 July they landed in Venice. News of their victories preceded them.

Amadeus remained at the palace of the Carraresi in Venice for five weeks: paying off debts, making gifts of thanksgiving to churches, taking out more loans (8,872 ducats from Bartholomeo Michaelis and 10,346 from Federigo Cornaro). He visited Treviso for some festivities, the meaning of which is unclear (23–26 August). To discharge his vows, Amadeus was required to take the ambassadors of John V to Rome. He went by land up to Pavia, where he arrived on 18 September 1367 to await his baggage coming up by the waters of the Po and his treasury coming down from Savoy to finance his final pilgrimage to Rome. On 25 September he set out for Pisa, and from there to Viterbo, where he met Pope Urban and presented the Byzantine embassy. He continued with the Papal entourage to Rome, where Pope Urban solemnly entered the city on 12 October, the first pope in Rome since 1305. Amadeus remained at Rome about two weeks before returning to Chambéry by Christmas via Perugia and Florence (early November), through Pavia (mid-November), Parma, Borgo San Donnino and Castel San Giovanni. Throughout his journey from Venice to Rome to Savoy, the count was honoured as a triumphant crusader.

== Loss of Emona and Gallipoli ==
Amadeus left the city of Emona in the hands of his illegitimate son, the elder Antoine, with a small garrison. According to the chroniclers of Savoy, Jehan Servion and Jean d'Oronville Cabaret, the inhabitants deceived the Savoyards with acts of kindness before leading them into an ambush, where Antoine was captured. Antoine is supposed to have languished in a Bulgarian prison until his death. Although this account is not corroborated by earlier sources, it is certain that Emona was lost to the Bulgarians and that the elder Antoine does not appear in his father's treasury accounts any time after the crusade.

Gallipoli was not lost to Christendom by any action of the Turks. After three years of civil war between John V and his son, Andronicus IV, it was handed over to them by the latter as payment for their support. Thus it was occupied after ten years of Christian occupation in the winter of 1376–77 by Sultan Murad I.
