= Philip I of Piedmont =

Philip I Filippo di Savoia
- Lord of Piedmont Prince of Achaea
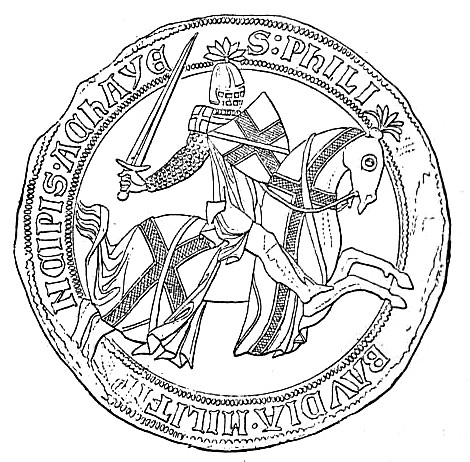
- Seal of Philip I of Piedmont as Prince of Achaea

Lord of Piedmont
- Reign: 1282-1334
- Predecessor: Thomas III
- Successor: James

Prince of Achaea (with Isabella)
- Reign: 1301–1307
- Predecessor: Isabella
- Successor: Philip II
- Born: 1278
- Died: 25 September 1334 (aged 55–56)
- Spouse: Isabella of Villehardouin; Catherine de la Tour du Pin
- Dynasty: House of Savoy
- Father: Thomas III of Piedmont
- Mother: Guyonne de Châlon

Coat of arms of the principality of Achaea.

Coat of arms of the lordship and principality of Piedmont.

Philip I, known as Philip of Savoy (French: Philippe de Savoie, Italian: Filippo di Savoia-Acaia) (1278 – 25 September 1334) was the lord of Piedmont from 1282 until his death and prince of Achaea between 1301 and 1307. He was the son of Thomas III of Piedmont and Guia of Burgundy.

Philip's first marriage was celebrated in Rome on 12 February 1301 to Isabella of Villehardouin, Princess of Achaea. They had three daughters: Mary, Alice and Margaret. By that marriage, he became Prince of Achaea, though he had already been lord of Piedmont by inheritance from his father in 1282. He was, however, an authoritative prince and this put him at odds with the baronage of his realm. He tried to placate the barons of Morea, but was forced to accept a parliament in 1304. The Greek archonts from Skorta revolted in 1302. In 1307, King Charles II of Naples, the suzerain of Achaea, confiscated the principality and gave it to his son, Prince Philip I of Taranto.

In 1312, Philip married Catherine de la Tour du Pin (died 1337), daughter of Humbert I of Viennois and had issue:

- James of Piedmont
- Eleanor married Manfred V of Saluzzo
- Beatrice married Humbert de Thoire-Villars
- Agnes married John de la Chambre
- Joan married Aimée de Poitiers
- Amadeus, Bishop of Maurienne from 1349-1376
- Thomas, Bishop of Turin from 1351-1360
- Edward, Archbishop of Tarentaise from 1386-1395
- Aimone, married Mencia de Ceva, died 1398, was in Savoyard crusade
- Isabelle, married John, viscount of Maurienne

== Sources ==
- Bon, Antoine (1969). La Morée franque. Recherches historiques, topographiques et archéologiques sur la principauté d'Achaïe [The Frankish Morea. Historical, Topographic and Archaeological Studies on the Principality of Achaea] (in French). Paris: De Boccard. OCLC 869621129.
- Cox, Eugene L. (1967). The Green Count of Savoy. Princeton, New Jersey: Princeton University Press. LCCN 67-11030.
- Longnon, Jean (1969) [1962]. "The Frankish States in Greece, 1204–1311". In Setton, Kenneth M.; Wolff, Robert Lee; Hazard, Harry W. (eds.). A History of the Crusades, Volume II: The Later Crusades, 1189–1311. Vol. 2 (Second ed.). Madison, Milwaukee, and London: University of Wisconsin Press. pp. 234–275. ISBN 0-299-04844-6.
- "Heraldic Trace Petito". Heraldrys Institute Of Rome. 2020–2021.

Regnal titles
Preceded by Isabella	Prince of Achaea; 1301–1307	Succeeded by Philip II
