= County of Geneva =

Of the Holy Roman Empire

County of Geneva Comté de Genève (fr) Grafschaft Genf (de)
- 10th century–1401
- Coat of arms

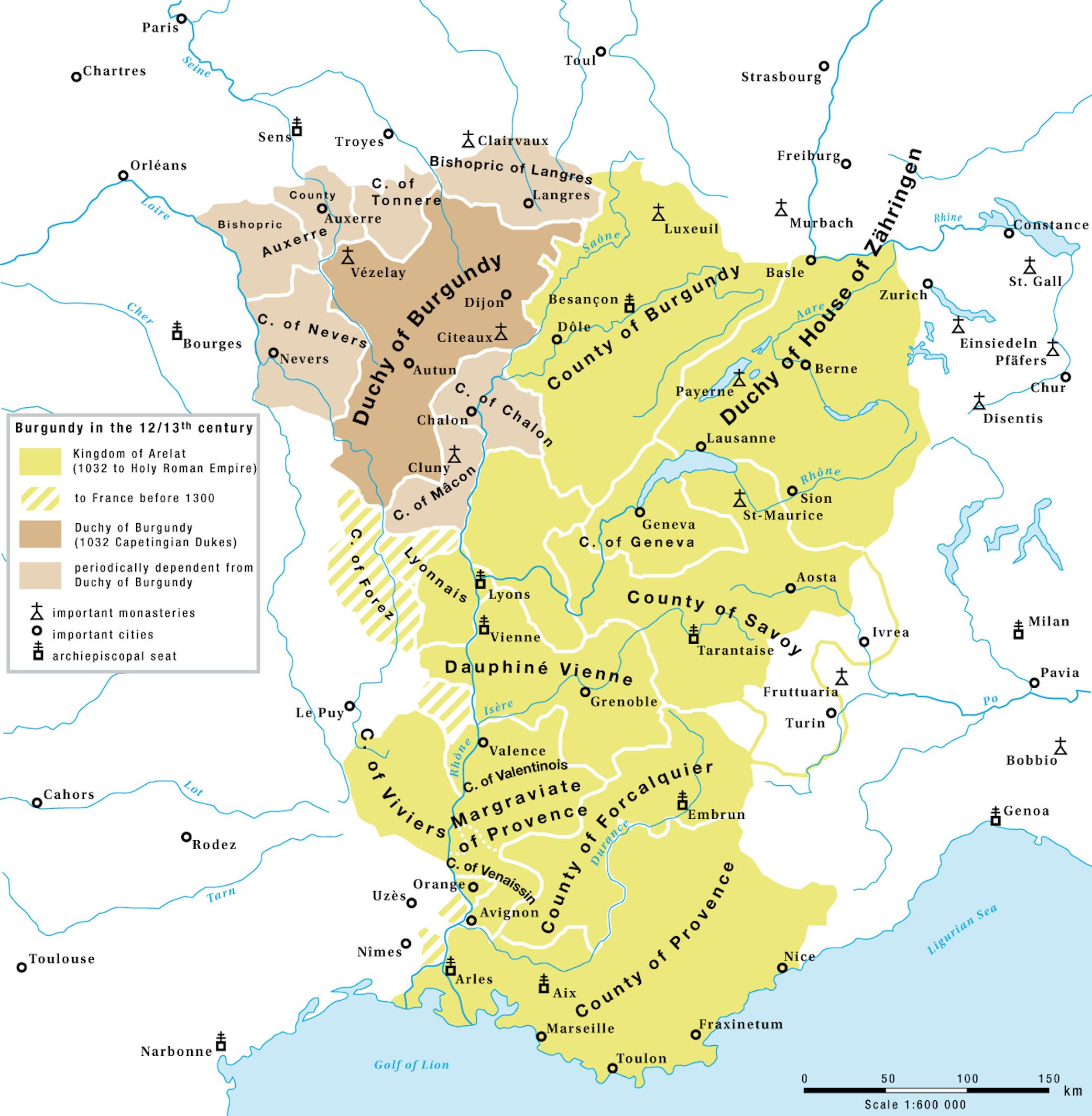
- Arelat (yellow) with Geneva, about 1200
- Status: County
- Capital: La Roche; Annecy (1219–1320)
- Historical era: Middle Ages
  - County established: 10th century
  - Line extinct: 1394
  - Purchased by Savoy: 1401
  - Genevois province: 1659
| Preceded by | Succeeded by |
| Kingdom of Arles | County of Savoy / County of Savoy |

The County of Geneva, largely corresponding to the later Genevois province, originated in the tenth century, in the Burgundian Kingdom of Arles (Arelat) which fell to the Holy Roman Empire in 1032.

== History ==
Several nobles had held the title of a Count of Geneva in Upper Burgundy (Bourgogne transjurane) from the 9th century. The progenitor of the Counts of Geneva was Conrad I, possible count palatine of Burgundy, in Vienne. Count Cono/Conrad died about 1003 in exile, during the Hermann II's rebellion (his brother duke of Swabia, of Conradines lineage). Their son, Robert, count of Geneva, was born about 970 and died about 1020.

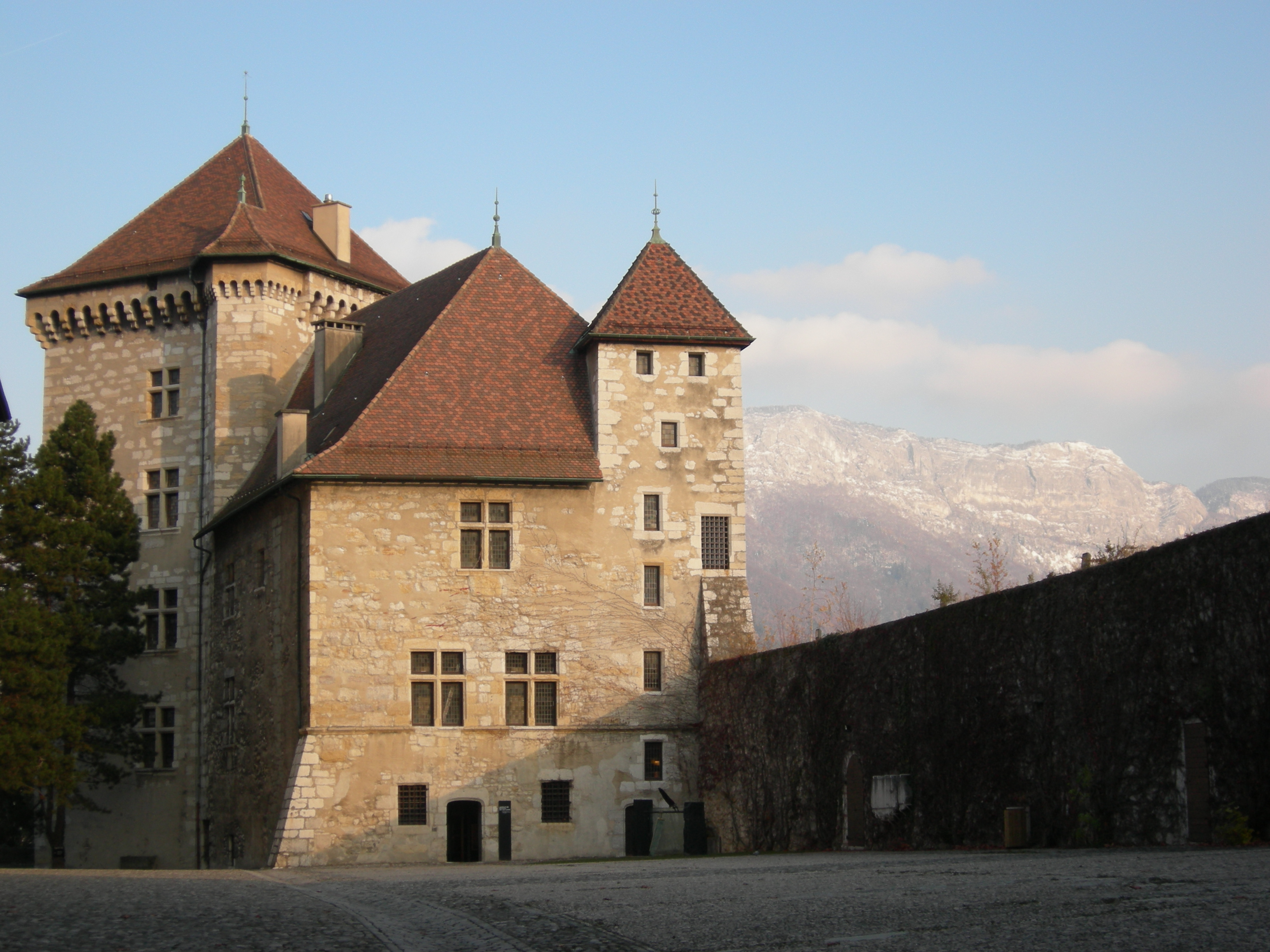
Annecy Castle

The county never played a major part as a feudal entity. The city of Geneva and its environs were retained, but the approaches to the western end of Lake Geneva, which had made the position strategic, were soon lost. In 1124, the Bishops of Geneva had their rule over the city acknowledged and continued to make themselves an independent force, while the Counts of Savoy encircled the territory and controlled the trade routes. From 1219 on, the counts' stronghold and capital was Annecy.

At a moment when the male line of the counts was near exhaustion, Robert of Geneva was raised to a shadow papacy by the French cardinals who seceded from the College of Cardinals and wished to rescind their part in the election of the irascible Urban VI; elected 20 September 1378, Robert took the title of Clement VII. Unexpectedly, with the death of his brother, he succeeded as count in 1392. As count, Robert was virtually dependent on the cooperative graces of the count of Savoy. With his death in 1394, the House of Geneva was extinguished and the title passed to the husband of the heiress, Humbert VII of Thoire and Villars who died in 1400.

Eventually in 1401, the year after Humbert's death, his heir Odo of Thoire-Geneva sold the comté to Count Amadeus VIII of Savoy. Though other members of the Genevan House protested, and the House of Chalons (and, after its extinction, the House of Orange-Nassau) remained the strongest claimant, Amadeus successfully completed the integration of the county with his territories, which were raised to a duchy by Emperor Sigismund of Luxembourg. The title Count of Geneva passed securely into the House of Savoy, where it is maintained as a courtesy title.

== List of counts ==
=== Legendary counts ===
Medieval historians connected the literary figures of Reynier and Olivier from the late-12th-century Girart de Vienne to the Genevois, but this is pure fiction.

- c. 770 : Reynier
- c. 770–800 : Oliver, his son

=== Early counts ===
- c. 890 : Manasses, may be count of Geneva
- ...
- c. 1002 : Manasses
- c. 1012 : Robert, his nephew, son of count Cono/Conrad I (possible Cono count palatine of Burgundy)

=== Unconfirmed counts ===
By Samuel Guichenon, in Histoire généalogique de la royale maison de Savoie (1660)

- 880 (?) : Ratbert (870/880 – † 901)
- 931 (?) : Albitius (900 – † 931/932), his son
- (?) : Conrad (930 – † c. 963), his son
- c. 963–974 (?) : Robert († 974), his son
- 974–1001 (?) : Albert
- 1004 (?) : Renaud
- 1016 (?) : Aymon
- c. 1060 : Robert

=== House of Geneva ===
- c. 1045–c.1061 : Gerold of Geneva
- c. 1061–1080: Conrad, his son
- c. 1080–1128 : Aymon I, his brother
- 1128–1178 : Amadeus I, his son
- 1178–1195 : William I his son
- 1195–1220 : Humbert I, his son
- 1220–1252 : William II, his brother
- 1252–1265 : Rudolf, his son
- 1265–1280 : Aymon II, his son
- 1280–1308 : Amadeus II, his brother
- 1308–1320 : William III, his son
- 1320–1367 : Amadeus III, his son
- 1367–1367 : Aymon III, his son
- 1367–1369 : Amadeus IV, his brother
- 1369–1370 : John I, his brother
- 1370–1392 : Peter, his brother
- 1392–1394 : Robert, his brother as Clement VII he was Antipope at Avignon from 1378

=== House of Thoire ===
House of Thoire

- 1394–1400 : Humbert VII of Thoire and Villars (died 1400), son of Humbert VI, Lord of Thoire and Villars, and Maria of Geneva, daughter of Amadeus III
- 1400–1401 : Odo of Thoire and Villars

In 1401, Odo sold the County to Amadeus VIII of Savoy. His heirs, however, contested this and the legal processes were not completed until 1424.

=== House of Savoy ===
From 1424 the County of Geneva was joined to the House of Savoy, although at times it was granted as appanage to cadet branches of the family.

- 1424–1434 : Amadeus VIII, Duke of Savoy
- 1434–1444 : Philip of Savoy (1417–1444), his son, apanagiste Count
  1444–1460 : Louis (1413–1465), Duke of Savoy, his brother
- 1460–1482 : Louis (1436 † 1482), his son, apanagiste Count, also King of Cyprus
- 1482–1491 : John of Savoy (1440–1491), his brother, apanagiste Count
- 1491–1496 : Charles II (1489–1496), Duke of Savoy
  1496–1497 : Philipp II the Landless (1438–1497), Duke of Savoy, great-uncle of the previous, son of Louis I
  1497–1504 : Philibert II the Handsome (1480–1504), Duke of Savoy, his son
  1504–1514 : Charles III (1486–1553), Duke of Savoy, his brother
- 1514–1533 : Philippe, Duke of Nemours (1490 † 1533), apanagiste Count of Geneva, Duke of Nemours, his brother
- 1533–1585 : Jacques, Duke of Nemours (1531–1585), Duke of Geneva 1564, his son
- 1585–1595 : Charles Emmanuel, Duke of Nemours (1567–1595), his son
- 1595–1632 : Henri I, Duke of Nemours (1572–1632), his brother
- 1632–1641 : Louis, Duke of Nemours (1615–1641), his son
- 1641–1652 : Charles Amadeus of Savoy (1624–1652), his brother
- 1652–1659 : Henri II, Duke of Nemours (1625–1659), his brother, Archbishop of Reims
- 1659–1724 : Marie Jeanne of Savoy (1644–1724), daughter of Charles Amadeus, married
  Charles Emmanuel II, Duke of Savoy (1634–1675) husband of the above

Subsequently, the County of Geneva was joined to the Duchy of Savoy.
