= Amadeus VI of Savoy =

Count of Savoy from 1343 to 1383

Amadeus VI
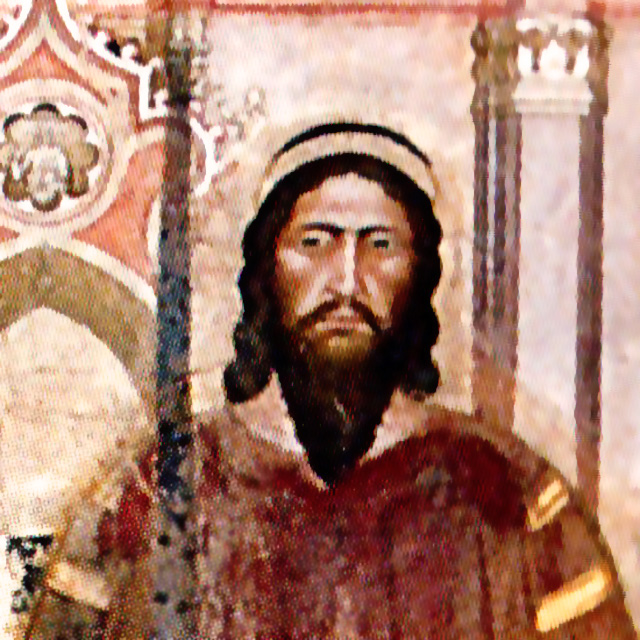
- Detail of Amadeus in a fresco by Andrea di Bonaiuto da Firenze in the Spanish Chapel: Allegory of the Active and Triumphant Church and of the Dominican order c. 1365

Count of Savoy
- Reign: 1343–1383
- Predecessor: Aymon
- Successor: Amadeus VII
- Born: 4 January 1334; Chambéry, County of Savoy, Holy Roman Empire
- Died: 1 March 1383 (aged 49); Castropignano, Kingdom of Naples
- Spouse: Bonne of Bourbon
- Issue: Amadeus VII of Savoy
- House: Savoy
- Father: Aymon, Count of Savoy
- Mother: Yolande of Montferrat

Amadeus VI (4 January 1334 – 1 March 1383), nicknamed the Green Count (Italian: Il Conte Verde) was Count of Savoy from 1343 to 1383. He was the eldest son of Aymon, Count of Savoy and Yolande Palaeologina of Montferrat. Though he began his rule under a regency, Amadeus quickly proved to be a decisive and capable leader, further advancing Savoy's rise as a political and military force in Europe. His most notable achievement was leading and personally financing the Savoyard Crusade against the Turks, during which he successfully aided the Byzantine emperor and extended Savoy's influence through both warfare and diplomacy.

== Early years ==
When his father died in 1343, Amadeus inherited the County of Savoy. Since he was only nine years old, his father's will left two cousins as co-regents: Amadeus III of Geneva and Louis II of Vaud. The two agreed to a document limiting their power as regents. Neither could make any significant decision without the other, and the decisions of both were subject to review by the resident council of nobles representing all bailis in the county.

Shortly after Amadeus took the county, his cousin Joan of Savoy renewed her claim on the County of Savoy, that she was descended from Amadeus's uncle Edward, Count of Savoy, though her claim had previously been denied under Savoy's Semi-Salic tradition. Though she died the following year, in her will she left the county to Philip, Duke of Orléans to spite her cousins. In 1345, he negotiated a similar settlement to the one Joan reached with Aymon, yielding the claim in exchange for 5000 livres annually.

Coat of arms of the counts of Savoy

Amadeus was educated both physically and mentally. He enjoyed learning to fight and ride. His education included classic works such as De Re Militari and more modern texts, including De Regimine Principum. He also showed religious devotion, requesting a portable altar and the right for his chaplain to say mass for him every morning wherever he may be. He took vows to fast more often than was healthy for him, and then asked Pope Clement VI to release him from these vows. The pope agreed, asking him instead to feed twelve of the poor weekly.

When the young Angevin queen Joanna I of Naples took the throne, several in northern Italy sought to take advantage of her inexperience and seize her lands there. John II, Marquess of Montferrat led the first attacks, while James of Piedmont, a cousin and vassal of Amadeus, backed the queen. After her first army was defeated in 1345, the attackers moved next into the territory ruled by James. In 1347, James asked Amadeus for help, and Amadeus sent an army. That army swept the attackers back through July of that year, with Amadeus joining the fighting in the last few weeks. John then recruited the help of Humbert II, Dauphin of Viennois, an old enemy of the Savoyards, and Thomas II, Marquess of Saluzzo. Together, they conquered the Angevin lands. Pope Clement VI spent 1348 negotiating a truce to end the fighting, which none of the combatants were satisfied with.

From 1348 through 1351, the Black Death ravaged the lands of Savoy, halving the population in some villages. In 1348, many of the peasants thought that it was caused by Jews poisoning wells and fountains. Though the castellans in some places tried to protect them, quite a few were killed. In Chambéry, the Jews were locked in the castle for their protection, but a mob broke in and killed several. Court officers were then pressured into finding the remainder guilty of poisoning, executing eleven and charging the remainder a fine of 160 florins per month for the next six years.

In 1349, Amadeus agreed to a treaty between himself, Amadeus of Geneva, James of Piedmont, and the House of Visconti, rulers of the Lordship of Milan, for mutual defence and assistance. This treaty included provisions for Lord Galeazzo II Visconti to marry Bianca of Savoy, sister of the count. To honour the marriage in 1350, Amadeus created the Order of the Black Swan.

In 1349, Humbert II de La Tour du Pin, Dauphin of Viennois, the last Dauphin of Viennois, surrendered his title and principality to the future King Charles V of France. At the time, the new Dauphin was the grandson of the current King Philip VI of France and son of his heir apparent, the later King John II of France. Humbert II retired into a Dominican monastery.

== Count of Savoy ==
In 1350, Guichard Tavel, the bishop of Sion and an ally of Savoy, attempted to take the rights of some nobles in Valais, a frontier of Savoy. When he and his followers were attacked in August 1351, Pope Clement VI excommunicated the rebels, and Amadeus sent in thirty knights. Eight thousand peasants rose up in response and captured a couple of castles. A further one hundred knights were sent in and pushed the rebels back. In March 1352, Amadeus assembled an army, including Amadeus of Geneva and John of Montferrat, and the count swept through the valley in April. The rebels yielded quickly, and Amadeus re-established the authority over Sion that his uncle Edward had lost.

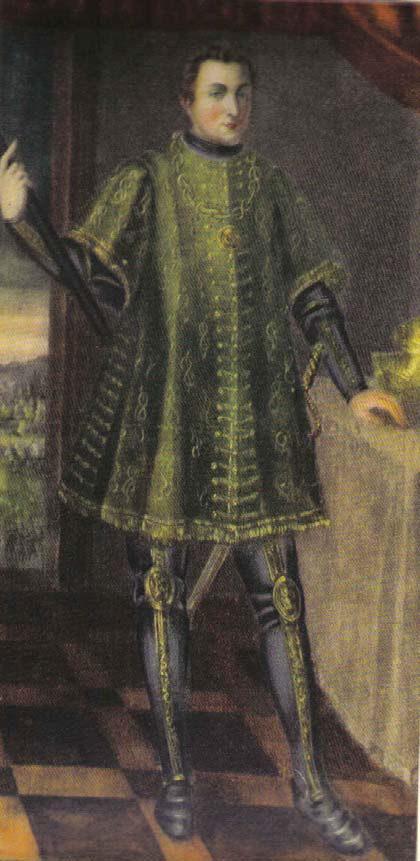
16th century portrait of Amadeus VI, by an unknown painter

In the summer of 1352, Hugh of Geneva, uncle of Amadeus of Geneva and a noble within the Dauphiné, re-ignited the long-standing feud with Savoy. The count of Savoy insulted Amadeus of Geneva's honour related to the treaty he had negotiated between Savoy and the Dauphiné, and so Amadeus of Geneva left the council and challenged one of the others, William de la Baume, who had replaced Louis of Vaud on the council. On 6 June 1352, the Count of Savoy made an alliance with Albert II, Duke of Austria for mutual aid in conflict. Amadeus of Savoy gathered an army from his Italian lands to bring to war. As they were crossing the Alps, the rebellion in Valais and Sion broke out anew. Amadeus turned his army there first, and on 3 November defeated the rebels soundly. On the morning of the fourth, his advisor, William, knighted him. He then had part of the wall of Sion torn down, and his army pillaged the city. He also fined the citizens heavily.

He earned the nickname the Green Count when, in celebration of his 19th birthday in 1353, he appeared in a series of tournaments dressed with green plumes upon his helm, a green silk tabard over his armour, and his horse bearing green caparisons. He entered with an escort of eleven knights dressed in green, each led by a lady also dressed in green, leading her knight's steed with a green cord. From then on, green was the favourite colour for his clothes and for his court.

In the spring of 1353, Amadeus prepared his army to attack the Dauphiné. King John II of France intervened and settled a truce in July, as he was hoping to use both armies in Gascony against the English, continuing the Hundred Years' War. However, Hugh immediately broke the truce. Amadeus besieged Hugh's forces in Gex from 26 October through 11 November, when Amadeus defeated and burned the city. Pope Innocent VI and John both sent delegations to negotiate a truce, but Amadeus and Hugh continued their fight until April 1354. The fighting ended then when Amadeus destroyed Hugh's army near Les Abrets.

In a treaty concluded in Paris in 1355, Amadeus agreed to exchange territory in Dauphiné beyond the rivers Rhone and Guiers, in exchange for recognition as the undisputed sovereign of Faucigny and the county of Gex, as well as becoming the suzerain lord over the Counts of Geneva, all of whose titles had been the subject of earlier contention between the Counts of Savoy and the Dauphins of Viennois. Amadeus also forced the Marquess of Saluzzo to pay him tribute, thus extending his rule to the Italian side of the Alps.

Amadeus was appointed Imperial vicar of Arelat by the Holy Roman Emperor Charles IV in 1365 in an attempt, which did not succeed, to revive the imperial hold on the Kingdom of Arles (Arelat). The following year, Charles IV ceded his rights to the crown of Arles to Count Louis I of Anjou after, however, transferring the County of Savoy to the jurisdiction of the Kingdom of Germany.

== Crusade (1366-1367) ==
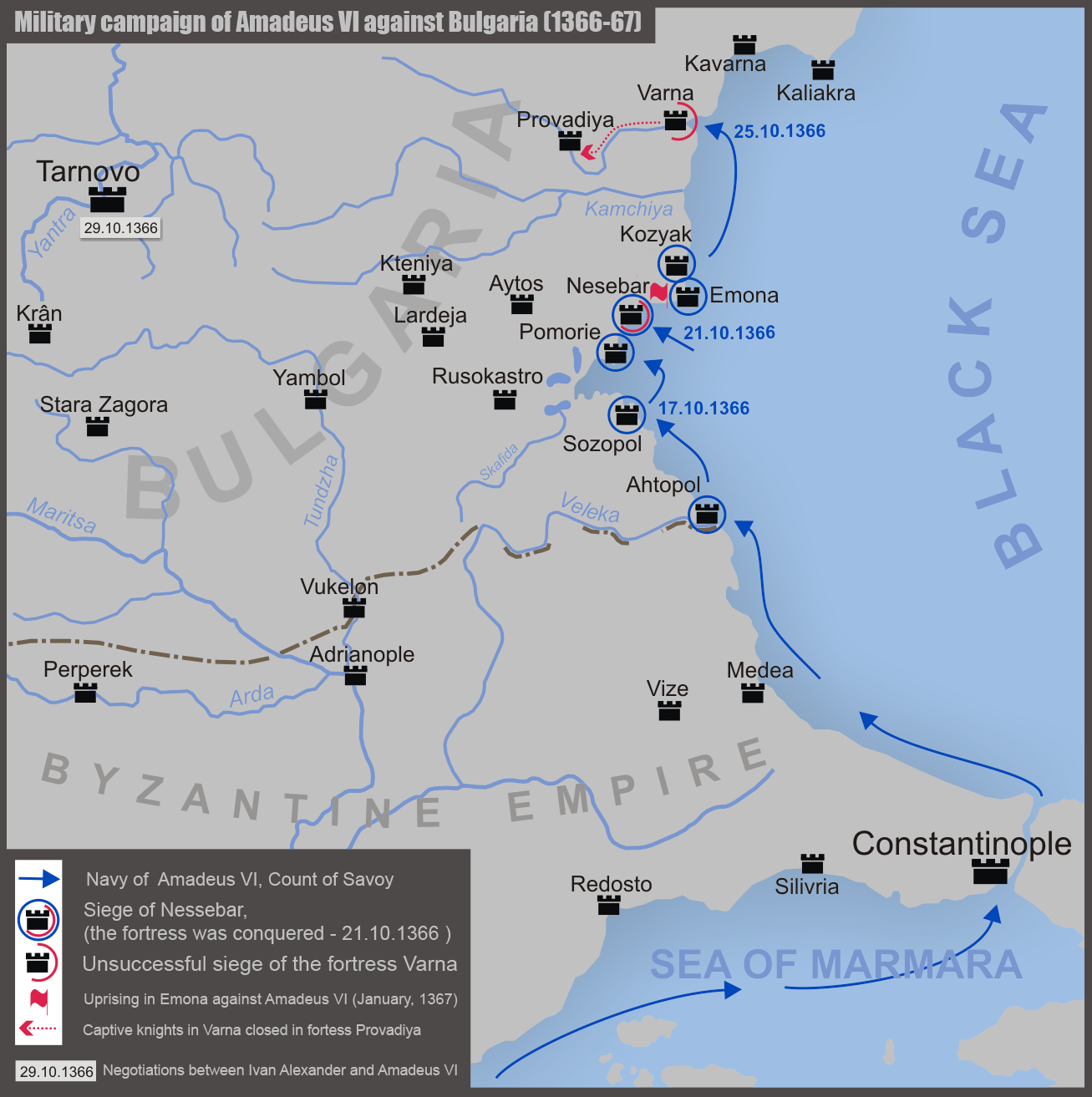
Military campaign of Amadeus VI against Bulgaria (1366–67)

Amadeus initiated a minor crusade (with 15 ships and 1,700 men) in 1366 against Sultan Murad I of the Ottoman Empire to aid his cousin, John V Palaiologos, the Byzantine Emperor, son of the Dowager Empress, Anna of Savoy. In this campaign, Amadeus joined forces with Francesco I of Lesbos, and the King of Hungary Louis I the Great, and they drove the Turks from Gallipoli. (This victory was short-lived, though, for they lost Gallipoli to the Turkish Sultan Murad I a few years later.) At this time, John V was held captive by the Bulgarians. Amadeus turned his forces against Bulgaria and captured the Black Sea ports of Mesembria and Sozopolis. He then laid siege to Varna and sent Tsar Ivan Alexander an ultimatum to release John V or suffer further defeat. Ivan Alexander released John V, and Amadeus returned to spend the winter in Mesembria, arriving there with John V before Christmas.

== Later years ==
From 1372 to 1373, he fought alongside Enguerrand VII, Lord of Coucy in Italy as a part of the Papal forces against the Visconti family.

In 1377, he ordered the installation of the first public mechanical clock in the region and established an officer to maintain it. He created a system of state-supported poor relief, one of the first of its kind in the late medieval world.

In 1381 at Turin, he mediated between Genoa and Venice and sponsored the peace treaty which brought an end to the War of Chioggia and the larger Venetian-Genoese War. The Republic of Genoa and the Republic of Venice had for long argued over the ownership of the island of Tenedos in the Aegean Sea near the Dardanelles. Eventually, it was agreed under the Treaty of Turin that as a compromise the island, after being depopulated and demilitarised, should be formally entrusted to Amadeus VI, Count of Savoy, a cousin to the Palaiologos imperial family.

Later, Amadeus would be persuaded by Antipope Clement VII (Avignon Obedience) to accompany Louis I, Duke of Anjou on an expedition to Naples. Here in 1382, the Count would share with Louis in the successful conquests of Abruzzi and Apulia. He died near Castropignano on 27 February 1383 and was interred at Hautecombe Abbey on 15 June 1383.

Amadeus was credited with purchasing the territory of the mountain pass, the Col de Largentièes, today Maddalena Pass on the border of France and Italy. This purchase took place in 1388, after his death, for the sum of 60,000 ecus.

== Marriage and children ==
Throughout his youth, negotiations took place for him to marry a royal bride. In 1338, he was engaged to Margaret of Bohemia, a three-year-old daughter of Charles IV, Holy Roman Emperor. From 1340 to 1344, he was betrothed to Joanna of Bourbon, niece of Philip VI of France. This marriage would have come with a dowry of fifty thousand florins. In 1347, he renounced that engagement, and became engaged instead to Joan of Burgundy, daughter of Philip of Burgundy and Joan I, Countess of Auvergne. This would have placed Amadeus as heir to her brother, Philip I, Duke of Burgundy. The three-year-old heiress was brought to the court of Savoy to be raised. In the summer of 1351, Amadeus sent to King Edward III of England, seeking to marry his daughter, Isabella. This petition was protested by Amadeus of Geneva. Joan remained at the court until 18 April 1355, when she was sent to a convent in Poissy to live out her life.

He was married in 1355 in Paris to Bonne of Bourbon, the sister-in-law of Charles V of France. They had three children:

- An unnamed daughter, born 1358 died after a few weeks
- Amadeus VII (March 1360 – 1 November 1391). Succeeded him as the Count of Savoy. He married Bonne of Berry (1365–1435), daughter of Duke John of Berry and a niece of Bonne of Bourbon.
- Louis of Savoy, born late 1364, died before the end of the year

== In literature ==
Amadeus is one of the main characters in the New Weird novel La luce di Orione (2007) by Valerio Evangelisti. He is also a supporting character in the Chivalry series by Christian Cameron, with his epithet providing the title of the third novel, The Green Count (2017).

== Sources ==
- Coolidge, W. A. B. (October 1915). "The Passages of the Alps in 1518". The English Historical Review. 30 (120): 681–691. doi:10.1093/ehr/xxx.cxx.681. "Le Col d'Argentière qui est en la terre nove de la conté de Nyce qui souloit estre du païs de Provence. Et fut baillée en gaige pour certaine somme d'argent que l'on dit de lx mille escuzau conte Vert pour lors comte de Savoye."
- Cox, Eugene L. (1967). The Green Count of Savoy. Princeton, New Jersey: Princeton University Press. LCCN 67-11030.
- Echols, Anne; Williams, Marty (1992). An Annotated Index of Medieval Women. Markus Weiner Publishing Inc.
- Hulbert, J. R. (April 1916). "Syr Gawayn and the Grene Knyzt-(Concluded)". Modern Philology. 13 (12): 689–730. doi:10.1086/387032. S2CID 162395954.
- Norwich, John Julius (1996). Byzantium: The Decline and Fall. New York: Alfred A. Knopf.
- Norwich, John Julius (1997). A Short History of Byzantium. Vintage Books. ISBN 978-0-679-77269-9.

Amadeus VI of Savoy House of Savoy Born: 4 January 1334 Died: 1 March 1383
Regnal titles
Preceded by Aimon	Count of Savoy; 1343–1383	Succeeded by Amadeus VII
