= Order of the Black Swan =

European Acculturation

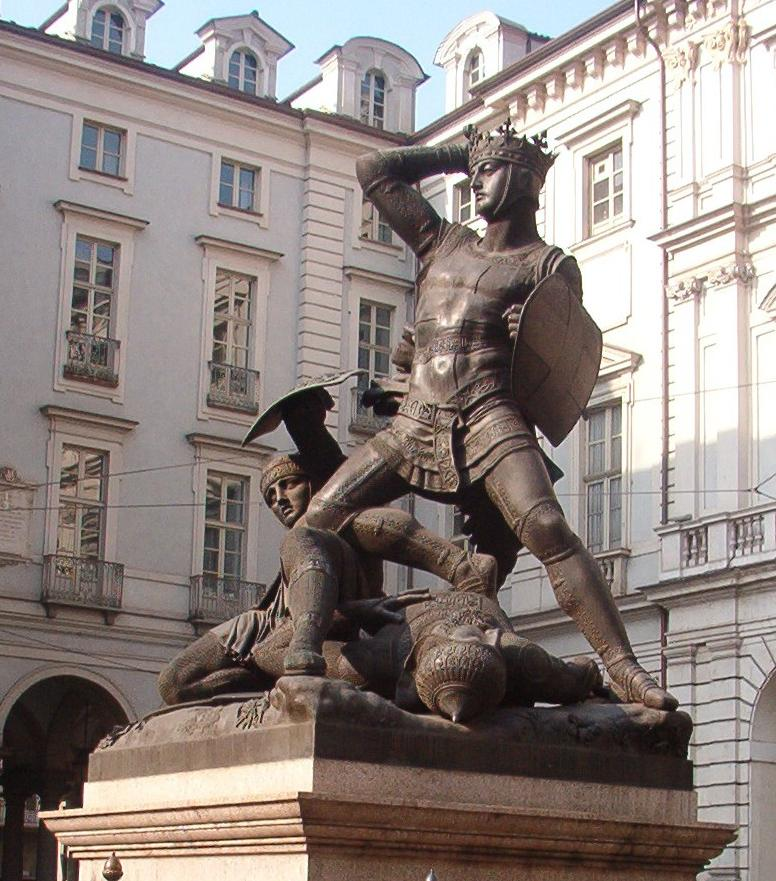
Statue of Amadeus VI of Savoy

The Order of the Black Swan (French: Companie du Cigne Noir or Compaignie du Cine) was a short-lived chivalric order founded by Amadeus VI of Savoy in 1350. It was defunct by 1364, when Amadeus founded the Order of the Collar in its stead. Along with Amadeus, Amadeus III of Geneva and Galeazzo Visconti were the "great lords" (grans seignours) of the Order. At the time of its founding, the existence of black swans was unknown to Europeans.

The order was originally composed of fourteen knights. The requirements of membership were the possession of a charger and a palfrey, and the ability to serve at one's own expense for one week whenever required. The Order did collect dues (at least from noblemen, riches hommes) for purposes estreordinaire (extraordinary) according to rank (puissance): eight écus from a knight banneret, four from what they called a chivallier simple, and one from any squire. Annually on Saint Andrew's Day the knights assembled and approved expenditures. In the meantime, the monies were stored in several religious establishments.

The Order's emblem was a black swan with red beak and feet on a white field, and members (compaignons) were required to display it, usually on their shields. Members swore an oath to defend each other, even against relatives beyond the degree of first cousin, and to submit all disputes between themselves to the judgement of the membership. Any knight who refused to abide by the arbitration of the others was expelled and his former comrades joined in arms against him.
