= Amadeus IV of Geneva =

Count of Geneva

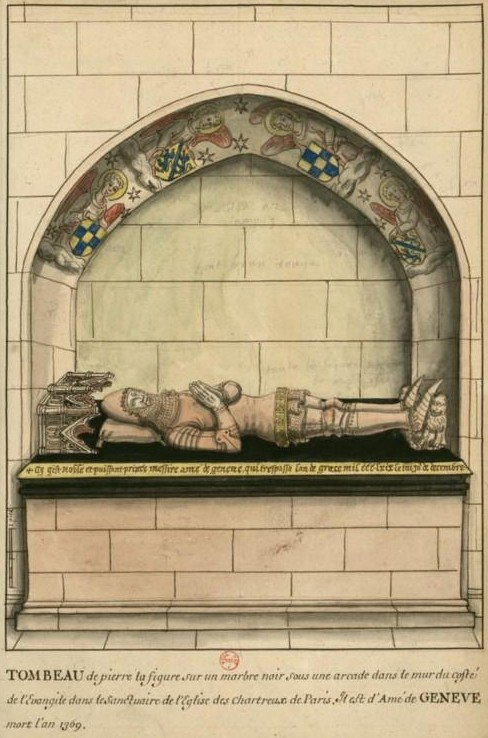
Sarcophagus of Amadeus IV

Amadeus IV (died 1369) was the Count of Geneva from 1367 until his death. He was the second son of Amadeus III and Mahaut d'Auvergne. He succeeded his childless brother Aymon III in August 1367. He reversed the policy of his father and brother respecting the House of Savoy, and supported the bishops of Lausanne and Geneva against his cousin Amadeus VI of Savoy.

Amadeus seems to have come to terms with his Savoyard cousin by 13 May 1368, the date on which he performed the act of homage to him for the county of Geneva. He then travelled with the count of Savoy into Italy for the campaign to bring Philip II of Piedmont to submission, and was present at Philip's trial by a stacked Savoyard court at Rivoli in September–October 1368. It is possible that the real reason for his accompanying Amadeus into Italy was to have an opportunity to speak with the Emperor, who was also in the region at that time. In February 1369 the Emperor repeated his revocation of Amadeus VI's vicariate. Amadeus IV died later that year.

== Bibliography ==
- Eugene L. Cox. The Eagles of Savoy: The House of Savoy in Thirteenth-Century Europe. Princeton, New Jersey: Princeton University Press, 1974.

Preceded by Aymon III of Geneva	Count of Geneva; 1367–1369	Succeeded by John I of Geneva
