= John de la Chambre =

English Member of Parliament

John de la Chambre (fl. 1314–1320), was an English Member of Parliament (MP).

He was a Member of the Parliament of England for City of London in 1314 and 1320.
