= Amadeus III of Geneva =

Count of Geneva from 1320 until his death (1311–1367)

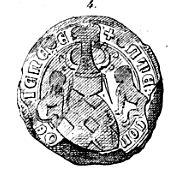
Seal of Amadeus III

Amadeus III (French: Amédée III, 29 March 1311 – 18 January 1367) was the Count of Geneva from 1320 until his death. He ruled the Genevois, but not the city of Geneva proper, and it was during his time that the term "Genevois" came to be used as it is today. He was the eldest son and successor of William III and Agnes, daughter of Amadeus V of Savoy. He played a major role in the politics of the House of Savoy, serving consecutively as regent and president of the council, and also sitting on the feudal tribunal—one of three tribunals of the Audiences générales—of the Duchy of Aosta.

== Conflict with Savoy ==
After the city and castle of Annecy were devastated in a fire in 1320, Amadeus moved his court to La Roche, which had been the seat of the counts of Geneva between 1124 and 1219. In 1325 Amadeus joined the coalition formed by Guigues VIII of Viennois against Edward of Savoy. On 7 August he fought in the victory of the Battle of Varey over the Savoyards. In 1326 the envoys of Charles IV of France negotiated a truce so that both counts, of Geneva and of Savoy, could join the king's expedition against Flanders in 1327–28. In January 1329 the new Count Aymon of Savoy came to terms with Amadeus, and the two established a commission to investigate the disputed territory between the Duingt and the Faverges. Ultimately Amadeus became a vassal of Aymon for at least a part of his territories. In 1338 another commission was established to deal with further boundary issues. The relationship between the peaceable and unambitious counts of Geneva and Savoy were, after 1337, always friendly.

In 1336 Amadeus donated the village of Vésenaz to the monastery of Bellerive.

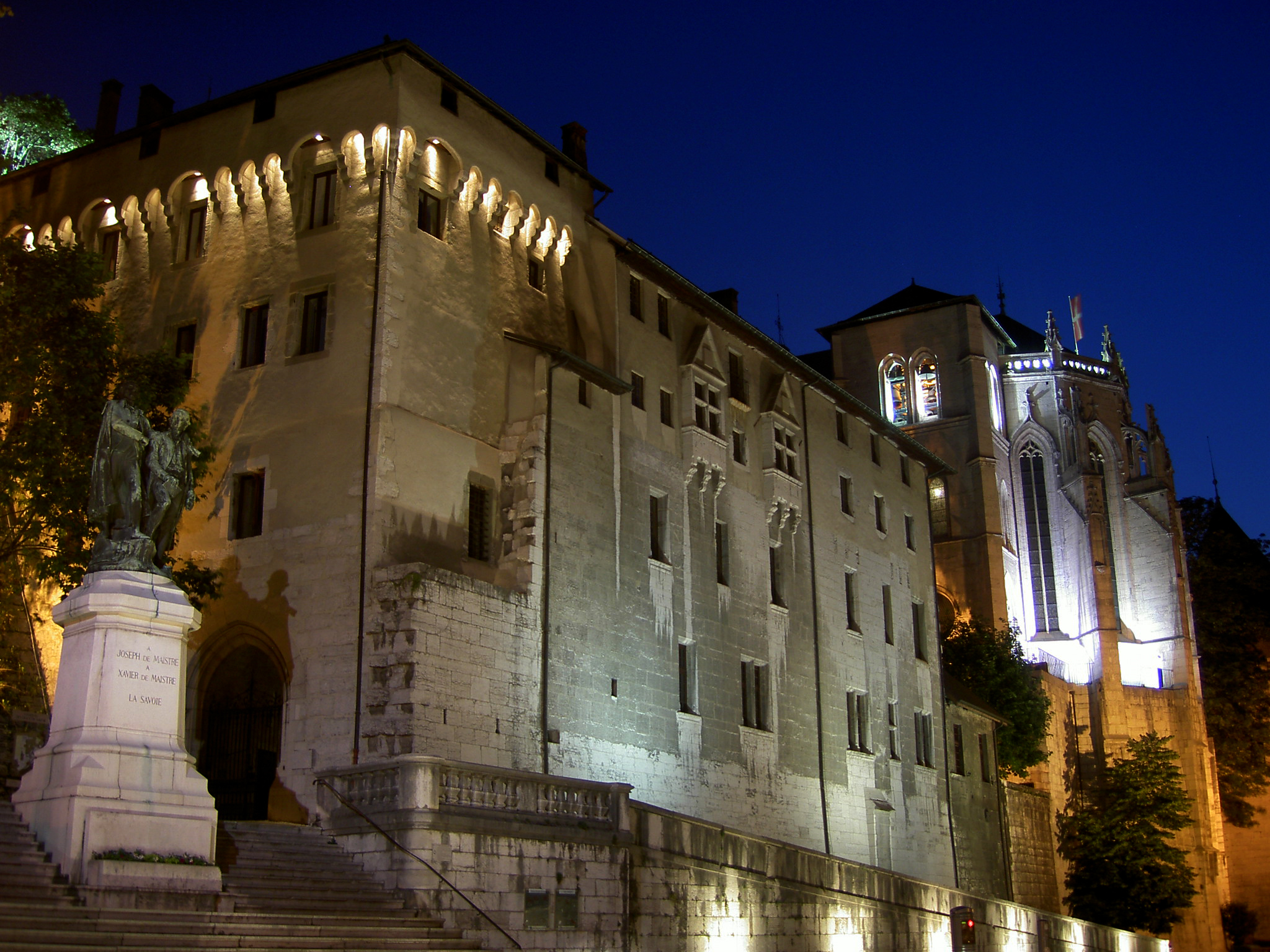
The Castle of Chambéry, showing the Sainte-Chapelle where Amadeus III stood godfather at his cousin's baptism, and where later he lived during his regency of the county of Savoy.

== Regency of Savoy ==
On 11 January 1334 Amadeus stood godfather to his first cousin Amadeus VI of Savoy in the Sainte-Chapelle, then under construction, at Chambéry. He and Louis II of Vaud were designated by Aymon as regents for the young Amadeus, which roles they assumed on Aymon's death on 22 June 1343. On 26 June, after Aymon's funeral, the young Amadeus was crowned as Count of Savoy and Amadeus of Geneva was the first to swear the oath of fealty. The count of Geneva and the lord of Vaud moved into the Castle of Chambéry and signed a written agreement, still preserved, whereby neither could act without the consent of the other, and all acts were to be committed to writing for purposes of review. (Note: Compare for the details of the regency council laid down in Aymon's will.) In the details of this agreement considerable mutual suspicion can be detected. The lord of Vaud was the senior statesman of the House of Savoy, while Amadeus III was the head of its chief rival.

The first concern of the regents of Savoy after 1343 was securing the succession against the claims of Joan, daughter of Edward of Savoy, who died on 29 June 1344, but not before ceding her claims to Philip, Duke of Orléans. Amadeus and Louis sent an embassy to Pope Clement VI, seeking his support against Joan and Philip. In 1345 Philip signed a treaty relinquishing his claims in return for an annual stipend of 5,000 livres tournois. The treaty was finalised at Paris and ratified at Chambéry on 25 February 1346. (Note: The royal treasury records Philip's receipt of the first payment on 19 November.)

== President of the council of Savoy ==
In 1347–48 Amadeus spent a long stay at the Avignonese curia of Clement VI, who was then concerned with settling disputes in the Piedmont and Lombardy. On 4 January 1348 the count of Savoy came of age and the regency ended, although it continued in practice, as Amadeus VI was only fourteen years old. Later that year the lord of Vaud died and Amadeus III was left as sole regent, overseeing the "council of Savoy" or "count's council", as the former regency council was then known. The Savoyard historians Jehan Servion and Jean Cabaret d'Oronville record that the council elected one of its members, Guillaume de la Baume, to co-rule with the count of Geneva, who was still not trusted by the Savoyards. Guillaume's election may have been due to French influence.

In 1348, Alamand de Saint-Jeoire, the Bishop of Geneva, placed two of his castles under the protection of the Dauphin Charles, future king of France, in an effort to stem the influence of the counts both of Geneva and of Savoy. Amadeus III's officials took reprisals against the diocese, bringing down the condemnation of Clement VI, who nonetheless maintained his good relations with the counts. Amadeus was not deterred. He seized the two castles and removed the Dauphin's banners, replacing them with his own. On 8 October 1349 an alliance was sealed at Cirié between Amadeus III of Geneva, Amadeus VI of Savoy, Galeazzo II of Milan, and James of Piedmont. This alliance was sealed by the marriage of the count of Savoy's sister Bianca to Galeazzo on 28 September 1350, which was followed by the creation of the Order of the Black Swan, of which Amadeus of Geneva was named one of the three grans seignours (along with the count of Savoy and Galeazzo).

By 9 July 1351, Amadeus had fallen out with the rest of the council of Savoy and its anti-French policy. On that day, presiding over a meeting of the council at Saint-Genix, he ordered that his opposition to hearing some ambassadors from Edward III of England be recorded. (Note: Edward III was then at war with France, the so-called Edwardian War.) Amadeus and the Savoyard chancellor, Georges de Solerio, were largely responsible for the subsequent treaty signed with France on 27 October at Avignon.

In 1351 the peasantry of the Valais rebelled against the lordship of the Bishop of Sion, then Guichard Tavel, of Genevan family and Savoyard allegiance. (Note: For the causes and background of the rebellion.) On 7 January 1352 the rebels were excommunicated by Clement VI. In March an army, led by Amadeus of Savoy, Amadeus of Geneva, John II of Montferrat, and Peter IV of Gruyère was gathering at Saint-Maurice to crush the rebels. The inhabitants of the Valais were so intimidated, however, that they surrendered without a fight.

== Disputes with Savoy ==
In May 1352 Amadeus VI of Savoy nullified the treaty of Avignon negotiated by Amadeus III, maligning (probably without basis) the count of Geneva's integrity. In July Amadeus formally withdrew from the council of Savoy and challenged the lords of La Baume, whom he considered his archenemies at the Savoyard court, to war. In 1355, after the conclusion of a war between the count of Savoy and the Dauphin Charles, Amadeus III refused to do homage to his cousin for those fiefs he held of the Dauphin. Amadeus also interfered with the count of Savoy's attempts to militarily occupy the barony of Faucigny that year, although he did not actively intervene. Despite his attempts he was unable to induce John II of France to intervene in the Faucignerans' favour. On 20 July in the Franciscan monastery at Geneva, Amadeus III did homage to his former ward the count of Savoy. The issues in dispute had by this time been brought before the Emperor Charles IV, the overlord of the entire region. On 21 August he ordered the count of Savoy not to interfere in the Faucigny or the County of Geneva and put both under his direct protection pending an investigation.

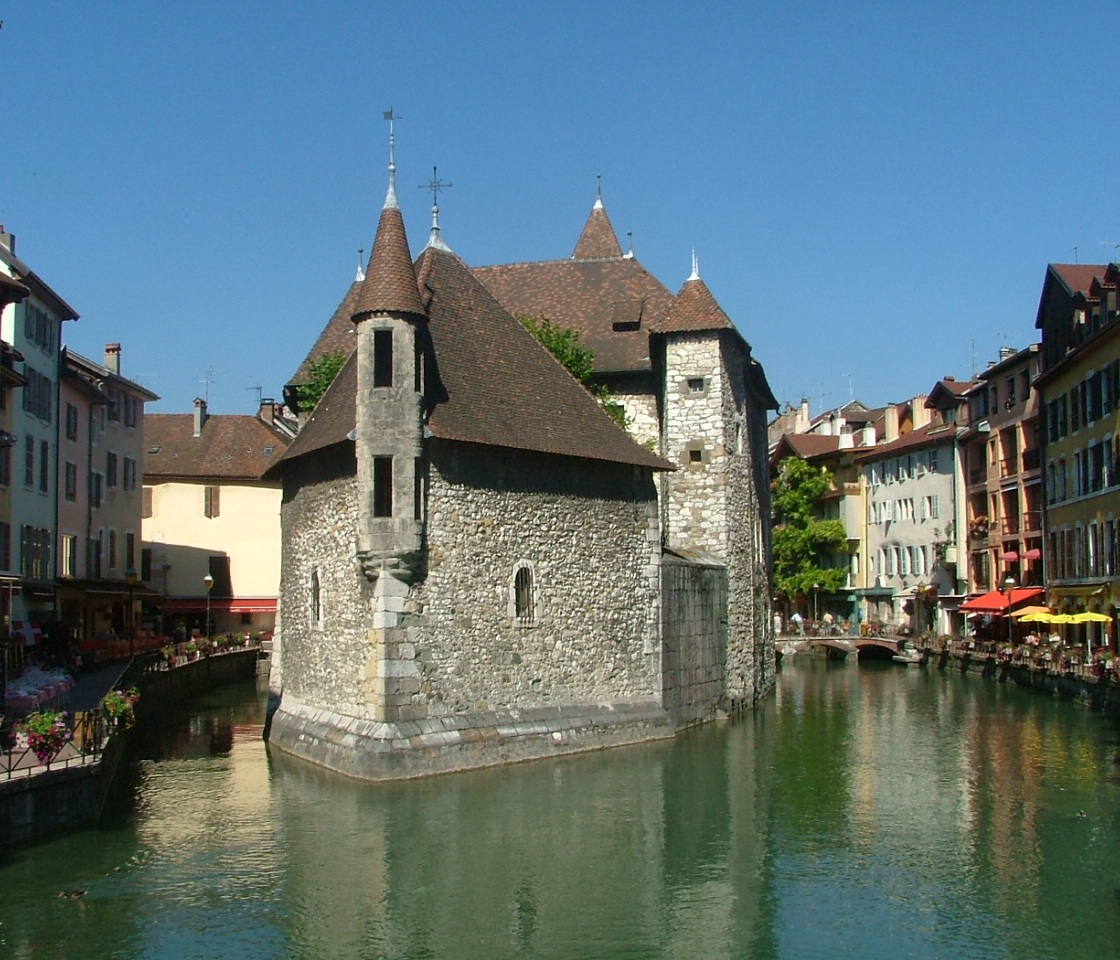
The Palais de l'Isle in Annecy, once the seat of the count of Geneva, was a mint under Amadeus III.

In May 1358 the Emperor exempted Amadeus III of the jurisdiction of Savoy and granted him the right to appeal to the Emperor all decisions by any other court, whether French or Savoyard. Amadeus, but not his successors, was granted the right to coin money (at the Palais de l'Isle), legitimise bastards, and create notaries. The bishop of Geneva immediately opposed the count's right of coinage to the pope. Amadeus of Savoy ordered Amadeus III to renew his oath of homage, but the latter instead asked for the arbitration of Jean de Bertrand, the Archbishop of Tarentaise. On 2 August the archbishop ruled that Amadeus had the right to mint coins, but not to refuse to renew the oath of homage nor to appeal outside of the courts of the count of Savoy. The count of Geneva refused to accept the result, accusing the archbishop of an "unjust and iniquitous" verdict and vowing to appeal to the Emperor personally (viva voce). The two counts came to terms by 21 December. Amadeus III agreed to render homage at Geneva for his fiefs Duingt, Annecy, La Roche, Clermont, Thônes, Gruffy, Arlod, Châtel, La Bâtie, and Gaillard, and for the "sub-fiefs" of his own vassals Thomas de Menthon, Guillaume de Compey, and Aymon de Pontverre. In return Amadeus VI declared the archiepiscopal decision void.

== Order of the Collar and the crusade ==
In January 1364 Amadeus III was named the second knight of the newly founded Order of the Collar. (Note: The date comes from Cox, who cites Jean Servion as the only source for the original membership of the order.) While the formation of the Order was connected with the launch of Amadeus VI's crusade, Amadeus III did not accompany the crusaders. He sent his eldest son, Aymon III, in his place, and he himself died only months after the crusaders departed, which suggests that he was in poor health at the time.

== Family ==
In 1334 Amadeus married Mathilde or Mahaut d'Auvergne, also called "de Boulogne", with whom he had numerous offspring, four of whom were counts of Geneva in succession:

- Aymon III, successor as Count of Geneva, leader of the Genevan contingent on the Savoyard crusade
- Amadeus IV, succeeded his brother as Count of Geneva
- John, succeeded his brother as Count of Geneva
- Peter, succeeded his brother as Count of Geneva
- Robert, later the Antipope Clement VII, succeeded his brother as Count of Geneva
- Mary, who married first (1361) John II of Chalon-Arlay (died 1362), then (1366) Humbert VII de Thoire, to whose son, Humbert VIII de Thoire (died 1400), the county of Geneva passed after the death of Robert
- Joan (died 1389), married (1358) Raymond V of Baux, Prince of Orange
- Blanche (died 1420), lady of Frontenay, married (1363) Hugh II of Chalon-Arlay
- Catherine (died 1407), married (1380) Amadeo, Prince of Achaea
- Yolanda, married Aimery VI of Narbonne
- Agnes, became a nun
- Louise, married Guillaume III le Sage, lord of Saint-Georges

== Sources ==
- Cox, Eugene L. (1967). The Green Count of Savoy. Princeton, New Jersey: Princeton University Press. LCCN 67-11030.
- Fleck, Cathleen A. (2016). The Clement Bible at the Medieval Courts of Naples and Avignon: "A Story of Papal Power, Royal Prestige, and Patronage. Routledge.
- Gagnebin, Bernard (1963). "Le livre d'heures d'Agnès de Savoie, comtesse de Genève". Genava: revue d'histoire de l'art et d'archéologie (in French). 11: 318–319. doi:10.5169/seals-727980.

| Preceded by William III of Geneva | Count of Geneva; 1320–1367 | Succeeded by Aymon III of Geneva |
