= Antipope Clement VII =

Antipope from 1378 to 1394

- Count of Geneva
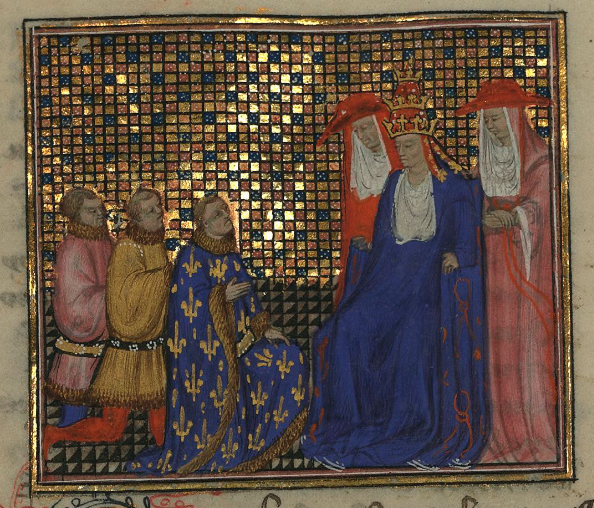
- Interview between the duke of Anjou and pope Clement VII (seated) at Avignon, from Froissart's Chronicles.
- Elected: 20 September 1378
- Papacy began: 20 September 1378?
- Papacy ended: 16 September 1394
- Predecessor: Roman claimant: Urban VI; Boniface IX; Antipapal claimant: Nicholas V
- Successor: Roman claimant: Boniface IX; Antipapal (Avignonian) claimant: Benedict XIII
- Opposed to: Roman claimants: Urban VI; Boniface IX
- Other posts: Archdeacon of Dorset; Archbishop of Cambrai; Bishop of Thérouanne

Orders
- Created cardinal: 30 May 1371 by Pope Gregory XI

Personal details
- Born: Robert of Geneva; 1342 Chateau d'Annecy, County of Savoy, Holy Roman Empire
- Died: 16 September 1394 (aged 51–52) Avignon, Papal States
- Coat of arms

Robert of Geneva (French: Robert de Genève; 1342 – 16 September 1394) was elected to the papacy as Clement VII (French: Clément VII) by the cardinals who opposed Urban VI and was the first antipope residing in Avignon, France. His election led to the Western Schism.

The son of Count Amadeus III of Geneva, Robert became archbishop of Cambrai and was made a cardinal in 1371. As legate, during the War of the Eight Saints, he is said to have authorized the massacre of over 2,000 civilians at Cesena in 1377. He was elected pope the following year by the cardinals who opposed Urban VI and established himself at Avignon.

== Biography ==
Robert was born in the Château d'Annecy in 1342, the son of Count Amadeus III of Geneva and Matilda of Boulogne, who were important within the House of Savoy. Guy de Boulogne was his maternal uncle. Robert studied at La Sorbonne in Paris. In 1359, he was appointed prothonotary apostolic, became bishop of Thérouanne in 1361, archbishop of Cambrai in 1368, and a cardinal on 30 May 1371. From 1373 he held the position of archdeacon of Dorset, and from 1374 also Prebend of All Saints Parish Church in Middle Woodford in Wiltshire, leaving both positions in 1378. From 1375, he held a living as rector of Bishopwearmouth in County Durham, England, and instead used the income from that highly prized living for his papal election expenses.

In 1377, while serving as papal legate in upper Italy (1376–1378) and in order to put down a rebellion in the Papal States, known as the War of the Eight Saints, Robert personally commanded troops lent to the papacy by the condottiere John Hawkwood. He occupied the small city of Cesena, which resisted being added to the Papal States. After the murder of 300 to 400 of his soldiers, he authorized the massacre of 3,000–8,000 civilians, an atrocity even by the rules of war at the time, which earned him the nickname butcher of Cesena.

In 1392, at the death of his brother, Peter, he inherited the County of Geneva, his four brothers having each died without issue before him. The title then passed from him through his eldest sister Mary to her son, Humbert of Thoire.

== Papal election and reign ==
Robert was elected pope at Fondi on 20 September 1378 by the cardinals who opposed the return of the papacy from Avignon to Rome, and the election of Urban VI in the latter town. He chose the regnal name of Clement VII, and became the first of the line of popes (now counted as antipopes) of the so-called Western Schism, the second of the two periods referred to as the Great Schism, which lasted until 1417. Following a victory at Marino by Urban VI's troops, Clement, feeling vulnerable, fled Anagni to Sperlonga, then Gaeta, finally landing at Naples. Received with great respect by Queen Joanna I of Naples, Clement found himself assailed by the local populace which chanted, "Viva Papa Urbano" and "Muoia l'Anticristo". He deemed Naples unsafe and fled by ship to Avignon, France, being greeted by five cardinals.

King Charles V of France, who seems to have been sounded beforehand on the choice of the Roman pontiff, soon became his warmest protector. Clement eventually succeeded in winning to his cause Castile, Aragon, Navarre, a great part of the Latin East, and Flanders. Scotland supported Clement because England supported Urban. He had adherents, besides, scattered through Germany, while Portugal on two occasions acknowledged him, but afterwards forsook him. Burgundy and Savoy also acknowledged his authority.

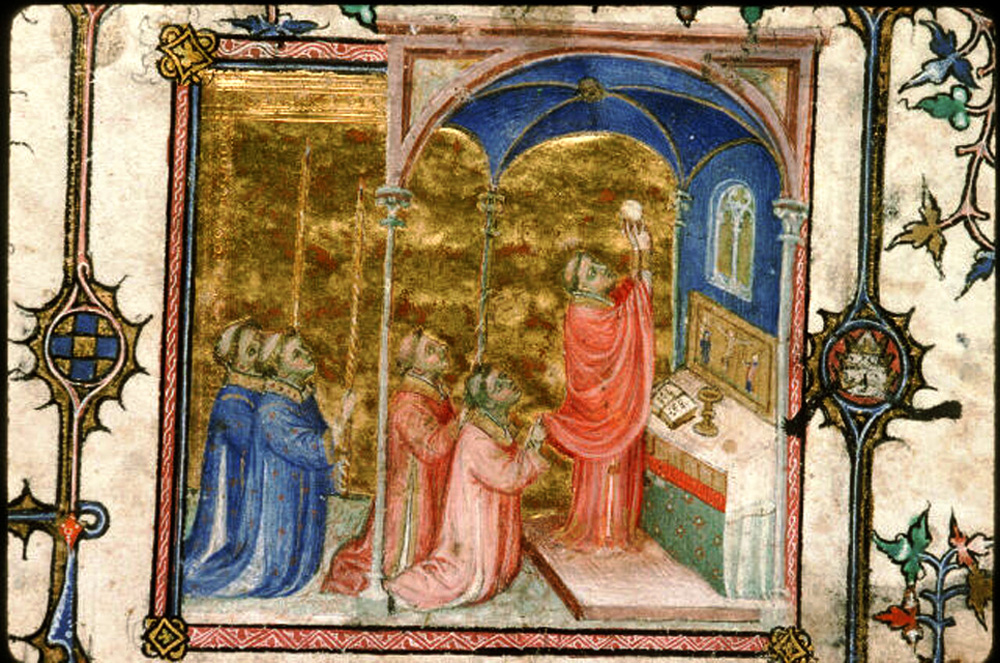
14th-century miniature depicting Clement VII celebrating mass

On 29 November 1378, Clement was excommunicated by Urban VI. Coupled with the expectation of succeeding to Queen Joanna, Clement incited Duke Louis I of Anjou, the eldest of the brothers of Charles V, to take arms in his favour. These tempting offers gave rise to a series of expeditions into Italy carried out almost exclusively at Clement's expense, in the first of which Louis went to war with some 40,000 troops. The campaign was unsuccessful: Louis suddenly died at Bisceglie on 20 September 1384. Still, these enterprises on several occasions planted Angevin domination in the south of the Italian Peninsula, and their most decisive result was the assuring of Provence to the dukes of Anjou and afterwards to the kings of France. After the death of Louis, Clement hoped to find equally brave and interested champions in Louis' son and namesake Louis II of Anjou, to whom he donated the larger part of the Papal States. Clement then tried to ally with Duke Louis I of Orléans, the brother of King Charles VI of France; with Charles VI himself; and with Count John III of Armagnac. The prospect of his brilliant progress to Rome was ever before Clement's eyes; and in his thoughts force of arms, of French arms, was to be the instrument of his glorious triumph over his competitor.

There came a time, however, when Clement and more particularly his following had to acknowledge the vanity of these elusive dreams; and at the end of his life he realized the impossibility of overcoming by brute force an opposition which was founded on the convictions of the greater part of Catholic Europe. Moreover, his ambitions and the financial needs of his court had resorted to simony, the loss of land and extortion which discerned among his adherents the germs of disaffection. To solicit political support, he created nineteen of the thirty-three total cardinals, but he seems never to have sincerely desired the termination of the schism.

He died at Avignon on 16 September 1394. Benedict XIII was elected to succeed him.

Eventually it was determined that he would be recorded as an antipope rather than as a pope. Uncertainty over who the legitimate pope might be during the time of the Western Schism gave rise to the legal theory called Conciliarism, which claimed that a general council of the Church was superior to the pope and could therefore judge between rival claimants.

== See also ==
- Clement Bible

== Sources ==
- Caferro, William (2006). John Hawkwood: An English Mercenary in Fourteenth-Century Italy. Johns Hopkins University Press. ISBN 9780801883231.
- Creighton, Mandell (2012). A History of the Papacy During the Period of the Reformation. Vol. 1: The Great Schism – The Council of Constance. 1378–1418. Cambridge University Press.
- Fleck, Cathleen A. (2009). "Seeking Legitimacy: Art and Manuscripts for the Popes in Avignon from 1378 to 1417". In Rollo-Koster, Joëlle; Izbicki, Thomas M. (eds.). A Companion to the Great Western Schism (1378–1417). Brill.
- Guenée, Bernard (1991). Between Church and State: The Lives of Four French Prelates in the Late Middle Ages. University of Chicago Press.
- Keen, Maurice, ed. (2010). Medieval Warfare: A History. Oxford University Press.
- McBrien, Richard P. (1997). Lives of the Popes. HarperCollins.
- Murphy, David (2007). Condottiere 1300–1500: Infamous Medieval Mercenaries. Osprey Publishing.
- Pattenden, Miles (2017). Electing the Pope in Early Modern Italy, 1450–1700. Oxford University Press.
- Pham, John-Peter (2004). Heirs of the Fisherman: Behind the Scenes of Papal Death and Succession. Oxford University Press.
- Trexler, R.C. (1974). The Spiritual Power: Republican Florence under Interdict. Brill.
- Ullman, Walter (1948). The Origins of the Great Schism: A study in fourteenth-century ecclesiastical history. Burns Oates and Washbourne Ltd.
- Walsh, Michael J. (2011). The Cardinals: Thirteen Centuries of the Men Behind the Papal Throne. Wm. B. Eerdmans Publishing. ISBN 978-0-8028-2941-2.
- Williams, George L. (1998). Papal Genealogy: The Families and Descendants of the Popes. McFarland & Company Inc.

Catholic Church titles
Preceded by Pierre d'André	Archbishop of Cambrai; 1368–1371	Succeeded by Gérard de Dainville
Preceded by Gilles Aycelin de Montaigu	Bishop of Thérouanne; 1361–1368	Succeeded by Gérard de Dainville
Regnal titles
Preceded by Peter	Count of Geneva; 1392–1394	Succeeded by Humbert
