= James of Piedmont =

Lord of Piedmont, Prince of Achaea (1315–1367)

James (January 1315 – May 1367) was the Lord of Piedmont from 1334 to his death. He was the eldest son of Philip I and Catherine de la Tour du Pin. While his father had been stripped of the Principality of Achaea in 1307 by the Angevins of the Kingdom of Naples, James continued to use the princely title and even passed it on to his successors. However, James was not a son of Isabella Villehardouin - the first wife of his father - and thus not a descendant of the Villehardouin dynasty.

James had backed the young Angevin queen Joanna I of Naples when John II, Marquess of Montferrat sought to take advantage of her youth and inexperience to gain broader lands in northern Italy starting in 1344. After the Angevin defeat at the Battle of Gamenario in 1345, John and his allies moved next to attack Chieri, a town loyal to James. James was jealous of his cousin and lord, Amadeus VI, Count of Savoy, believing that as a son of the more senior branch, he should rule Savoy. However, in 1347, he had to call for help from Amadeus. Backed by the Savoyard army, James was able to reclaim Chieri on 19 May 1347. After this, they swept on to take Alba, Cuneo, and Savigliano. This was then countered by an alliance between Montferrat, Thomas II, Marquess of Saluzzo, and Humbert II of Viennois. Pope Clement VI spent 1348 negotiating a truce and then treaty between all the combatants, though none were satisfied with it.

In 1349 James agreed to a treaty of mutual defence and assistance between himself, Amadeus VI of Savoy, Amadeus III of Geneva, and the House of Visconti, rulers of Milan. This treaty included provisions for Galeazzo II Visconti to marry Bianca of Savoy, sister of the count.

James opposed Robert of Taranto in Achaea in the 1340s. He began a war with Amadeus VI of Savoy, but was captured at Pinerolo and his territories confiscated. A treaty of 2 July 1362 returned them, however. James died at Pinerolo a few years later.

James married his first wife Beatrice d'Este in 1338, daughter of Rinaldo II d'Este. She died in 1339 without having children.

James remarried on 9 June 1339 to Sibyl, daughter of Raymond II of Baux and had:

- Philip II.

After Sibyl died in 1361, James remarried on 16 July 1362 to Margaret (1346 – 1402), daughter of Edward I of Beaujeu, They had two sons:

- Amadeus
- Louis

== Sources ==
- Cox, Eugene L. (1967). The Green Count of Savoy. Princeton, New Jersey: Princeton University Press. LCCN 67-11030.
