= Louis of Piedmont =

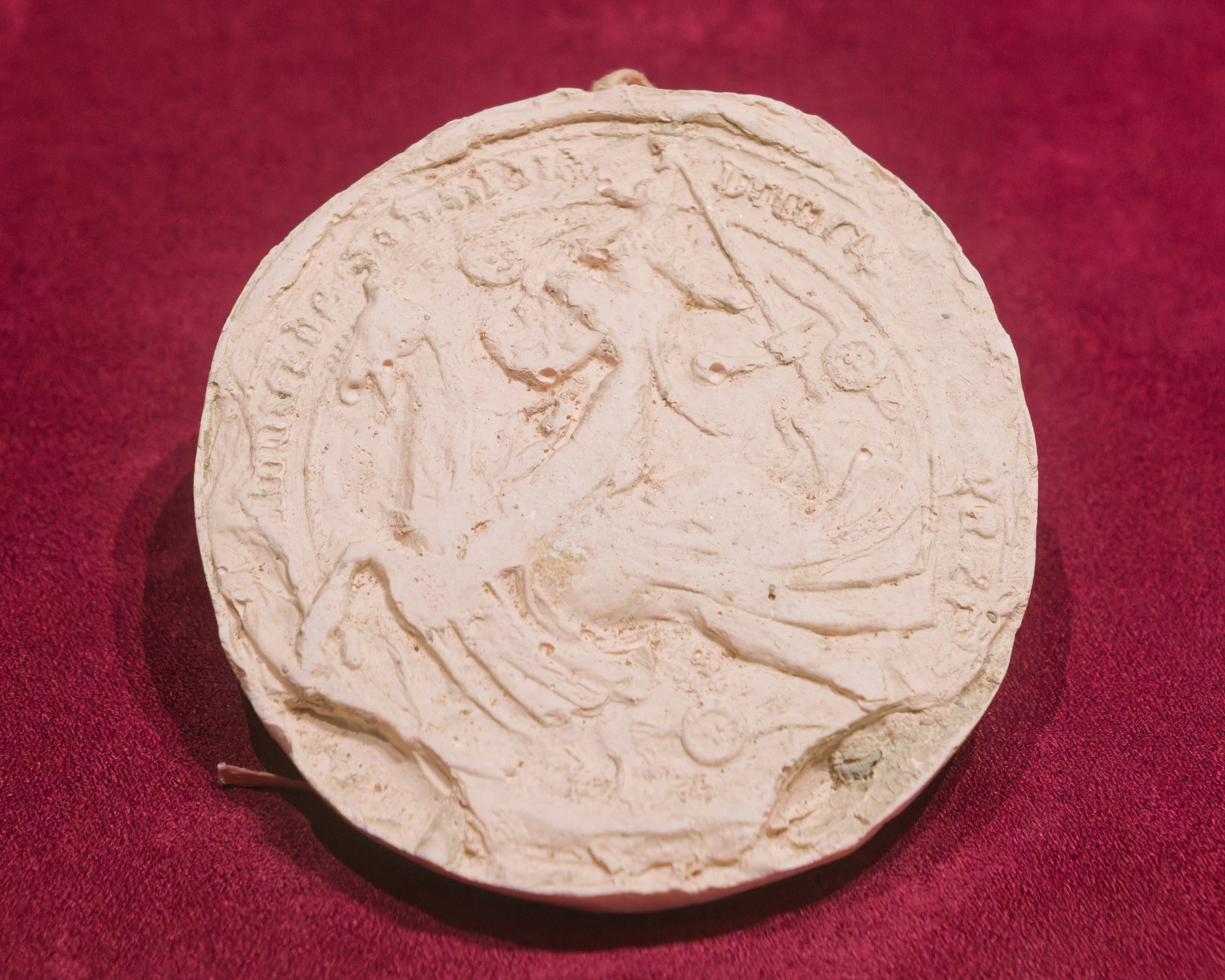
Seal of Louis of Piedmont, 1417

Louis (1364 – 11 December 1418) was the Lord of Piedmont and titular claimant of the title of the Prince of Achaea from 1402. He was a son of James of Piedmont and Marguerite de Beaujeu (1346–1402).

In 1405, he founded the University of Turin. On 24 January 1403, he married Bona (1388–1432), daughter of Amadeus VII, Count of Savoy, but they never had any children. When he died in 1418, the Piedmont-Achaea cadet branch of the House of Savoy died with him. His titles and estates were inherited by the junior ducal line of the House of Savoy.
