= Prince of Piedmont =

Appanage of the County of Savoy

The lordship of Piedmont, later the principality of Piedmont (Italian: Piemonte), was originally an appanage of the County of Savoy, and as such its lords were members of the Achaea branch of the House of Savoy. The title was inherited by the elder branch of the dynasty in 1418, at about which time Savoy was elevated to ducal status and Piedmont to princely status. When the House of Savoy was given the Kingdom of Sardinia, the Savoyards used the style of Prince of Piedmont (Italian: Principe di Piemonte) for their heir apparent. This first came into use by Prince Victor Amadeus of Savoy.

The usage was retained when Victor Emmanuel II became King of Italy, "Prince of Piedmont" becoming roughly equivalent to the British "Prince of Wales", the title bestowed to the Crown prince.

== Lords of Piedmont ==
- ????–1233 Thomas I, also Count of Savoy
- 1233–1235 Amadeus IV, son of previous
- 1235–1259 Thomas II, brother of previous
- 1259–1282 Thomas III, son of previous
- 1282–1334 Philip I, son of previous, also Prince of Achaea (1301–1307)
- 1334–1367 James, son of previous, claimant to Achaea
- 1368–1368 Philip II, son of previous
- 1368–1402 Amadeus, brother of previous, claimant to Achaea
- 1402–1418 Louis, brother of previous

== Princes of Piedmont ==
Note: The names in bold denote those that succeeded to the throne.

| Picture | Name | Heir of | Birth | Became heir to the throne | Created Prince of Piedmont | Ceased to be Prince of Piedmont | Death |
|---|---|---|---|---|---|---|---|
| | Philip Emmanuel | Charles Emmanuel I | 3 April 1586 | | | 9 February 1605 | |
| | **Victor Amadeus** | Charles Emmanuel I | 8 May 1587 | 9 February 1605 brothers death | | 26 July 1630 became Duke | 7 October 1637 |
| | **Francis Hyacinth** | Victor Amadeus I | 14 September 1632 | | | 7 October 1637 became Duke | 4 October 1638 |
| | Victor Amadeus | Victor Amadeus II | 6 May 1699 | | | 22 March 1715 | |
| | **Charles Emmanuel** | Victor Amadeus II | 27 April 1701 | 22 March 1715 brother's death | | 3 September 1730 became King | 20 February 1773 |
| | **Victor Amadeus** | Charles Emmanuel III | 26 June 1726 | 3 September 1730 father became King | | 24 May 1751 became styled as Duke of Savoy | 16 October 1796 |
| | **Charles Emmanuel** | Victor Amadeus III | 24 May 1751 | 20 February 1773 father became King | | 16 October 1796 became King | 6 October 1819 |

== Princes of Piedmont and Naples ==
When the House of Savoy became the ruling dynasty of Italy in 1861, they continued to use the title of Prince of Piedmont for the heir apparent but also began alternating it with a new title, the Prince of Naples.

| Picture | Name | Heir of | Birth | Became heir to the throne | Created Prince of Piedmont | Ceased to be Prince of Piedmont | Death |
Prince of Piedmont
| | Humbert | Victor Emmanuel II | 14 March 1844 | 23 March 1849 father became King | | 9 January 1878 became King | 29 July 1900 |
Prince of Naples
| | Victor Emmanuel | Umberto I | 11 November 1869 | 9 January 1878 father became King | | 29 July 1900 became King | 28 December 1947 |
Prince of Piedmont
| | Humbert | Victor Emmanuel III | 15 September 1904 | | 29 September 1904 | 9 May 1946 became King | 18 March 1983 |
Prince of Naples
| | Victor Emmanuel | Umberto II | 12 February 1937 | 9 May 1946 father became King | | 12 June 1946; Monarchy abolished | 3 February 2024 |

== Insignia ==
Royal Standard of the Prince of Piedmont

Coat of arms of the
Prince of Piedmont
