= Choisy, Haute-Savoie =

Choisy Choézi (Savoyard)
- Commune
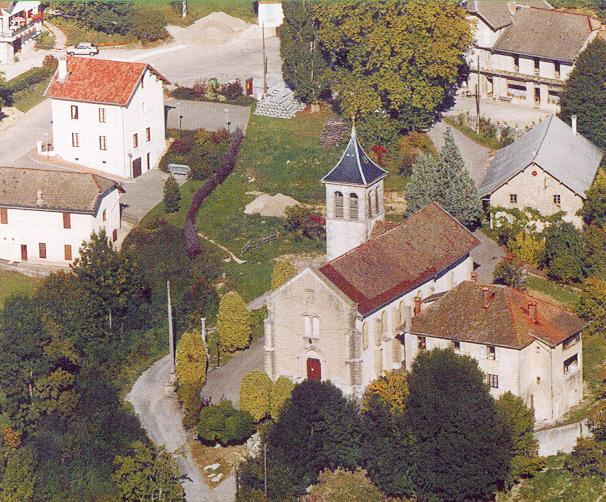
- The church and surrounding buildings

- Coat of arms
- Location of Choisy
- Location within France Location within Auvergne-Rhône-Alpes
- Coordinates: 45°59′N 6°03′E
- Country: France
- Region: Auvergne-Rhône-Alpes
- Department: Haute-Savoie
- Arrondissement: Annecy
- Canton: Annecy-1
- Intercommunality: Fier et Usses

Government
  - Mayor (2020–2026): Yves Guillotte
- Area^{1}: 16.57 km^{2} (6.40 sq mi)
- Elevation: 611 m (2,005 ft)
- Highest elevation: 905 m (2,969 ft)
- Lowest elevation: 350 m (1,150 ft)
- Population (2023): 1,731
  - Density: 104.5/km^{2} (270.6/sq mi)
- Time zone: UTC+01:00 (CET)
  - Summer (DST): UTC+02:00 (CEST)
- INSEE/Postal code: 74076 /74330
- ^{1} French Land Register data, which excludes lakes, ponds, glaciers > 1 km^{2} (0.386 sq mi or 247 acres) and river estuaries.

Choisy (French pronunciation: [ʃwazi]; Savoyard: Choézi) is a commune in the eastern French department of Haute-Savoie.

It lies 15 kilometers from Annecy and 35 kilometers from Geneva.

== Geography ==
Located 15 kilometers northwest of Annecy, Choisy belongs to the natural area of "Les Usses". It is situated at an altitude of 390 meters, between a brook to the west, known as "les petites Usses", and Mandallaz Mountain to the east. Approximately 70% of the land is arable and 20% is forested.

== Demographics ==
Since 1975, the rise in population has been continuous, doubling over two decades to reach 1,247 inhabitants by 1993, then 1,675 in 2018. One third of the population is less than 20 years old. The demographic changes are mainly due to the arrival of new inhabitants who work in the Annecy and Geneva areas.

== Economy ==
About thirty artisans and tradesmen work in Choisy, the vast majority belonging to the construction sector. There is no industrial activity. Agriculture remains the dominant activity, with about thirty dairy farms in operation. The dairy co-op collects 3.5 million liters of milk annually; the milk is used to make Abondance and Emmental cheeses.

== See also ==
- Communes of the Haute-Savoie department
