= Châteaux de La Balme =

Fortified house in Haute-Savoie, France

Château de La BalmeChâteau de Cosengier (Cosingier)
- Château de la Balme de Sillingyde La Balme de Cossengy
- La Balme-de-Sillingy, Haute-Savoie in France
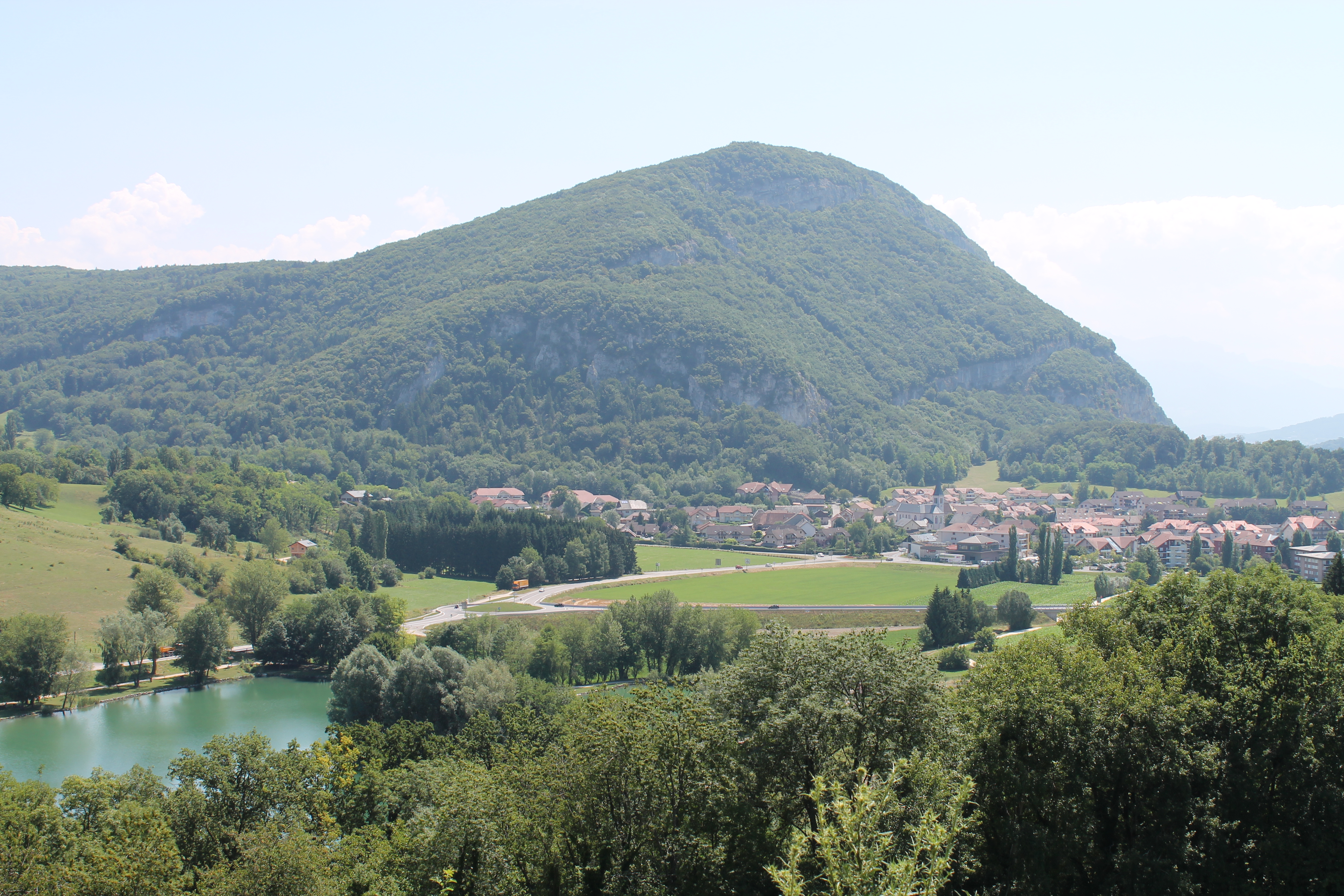
- View of the village of La Balme from La Bâtie.

Site information
- Type: Fortified house
- Open to the public: No
- Condition: Demolished

Location
- Coordinates: 45.9608024°N 6.0434732°E

Site history
- Built: 14th century

The Château de La Balme or Château de la Balme de Sillingy, formerly known as the Château de Cosengier (Cosingier) or La Balme de Cossengy (castrum Balmæ Cosingiaci), was a fortified house dating from the 14th to the 16th centuries, located in the former County of Geneva. It stood in La Balme-de-Sillingy, now in the French department of Haute-Savoie in the Auvergne-Rhône-Alpes region.

The Château de La Balme was the administrative centre of a castellany shared with La Bâtie. For its defence, it was associated with the Château de La Bâtie, also built in the 14th century on a hill to the north-west, and the fortified house of Dalmaz, dating from approximately the same period, on the north-eastern hill.

== Geography ==
The three castles, of which only the fortified house of Dalmaz survives, are located within the territory of the commune of La Balme-de-Sillingy in Haute-Savoie.

The comital castle of La Balme stood at the foot of the western section of the Mandallaz mountain, also known as La Balme, set back from the village of La Balme. It is believed to have stood below the present communal cemetery, on the site of the former village school, where an apartment building and childcare facility have since been constructed. It was located approximately 10 kilometres (6.2 mi) north-west of the town and Annecy Castle.

Built about 15 metres (49 ft) above a stream, the castle, together with the Château de La Bâtie, controlled the crossroads of routes linking Annecy with Clermont and Seyssel and its Rhône port, or Frangy, as well as the road from Rumilly to Geneva. through the Mandallaz Pass.

Nearby stood a priory dependent on Saint-Victor of Geneva, as well as the second castle known as La Bâtie or La Bathie. The defence of the pass was reinforced by two other fortified houses located in the present-day village centre, one of which still survives beside Saint Martin Church.

The Château de La Bâtie was destroyed by the Bernese in the 16th century. Only the place name survives in the modern Route de la Bathie, overlooking Lake La Balme.

The fortified house of Dalmaz stands to the north, controlling the road leading to Geneva via Choisy and Cruseilles. The name Dalmaz has survived as the designation of both the hamlet and a local road. The building is now surrounded by agricultural and residential development.

== History of the Château de La Balme ==
=== Toponymy ===
The fortified house is mentioned in historical documents under various names depending on the period. While it is now generally known as the Château de La Balme or Château de la Balme de Sillingy, after the modern commune, it was formerly known as Cosengier or Cosingier.,

The earliest reference mentions a “house in La Balme de Cosenggy,” Balmæ Cosingiaci, in a marriage contract of the Count of Geneva dating from 1279. The Régeste genevois (1866) mentions the forms Cosengier and Cosingier (1344) to refer to the parish that today bears the name La Balme-de-Sillingy. During the 14th century, the forms Cusangici (1306) and Cosengier (1344) are found. [9] François Mugnier, in his study of the châtellenien accounts, gives the form Balma Cosongiaco.

The parish of Sillingy is mentioned in the forms Silingiaco or Sillingiacus in the early 11th century, which also gave rise to Cusangiacus, then Cilingie in 1231.

While it had been in ruins for some time, reports François Mugnier, the inhabitants, who had forgotten its history, called it the “fairy castle”.

=== Possession by the Counts of Geneva ===
The first mention of the fortified house dates from a document of 1279., It appears in a marriage contract between Count Aymon II of Geneva and his future wife Constance of Moncade, Viscountess of Marsan, in which the castle was among the properties assigned in the event of the count's death.

Count Amadeus II of Geneva most likely abandoned his Château de Saconnex in favour of La Balme, where he drew up his will on 24 September 1306.,, Toward the end of the 14th century, the castle continued to serve as a comital residence alongside the castles of Annecy and Clermont.

In 1332, during the conflicts between the House of Geneva and the House of Savoy, Hugh of Geneva, son of Amadeus II, together with Humbert I of Viennois and Hugues Dauphin, Baron of Faucigny, attacked and captured both La Balme and the castle of Soirié (Groisy), which belonged to Count Amadeus III of Geneva. At the time, Amadeus III was at peace and allied with Count Aymon of Savoy., The castle was retaken by Aymon of Savoy in May.

Around 1356, the lordship of La Balme became a castellany. A castellany account records that Robert of Geneva stayed at the castle from July to October 1569.

On 15 October 1360, Count Amadeus III of Geneva made his will at the castle.

In 1370, the castle suffered a major fire., According to the castellany accounts, the blaze spread so quickly that even the silver tableware could not be saved and had to be recovered later from the ruins. The castle subsequently underwent repairs to its roof.

=== Savoyard possession ===
At the end of the 14th century, the last member of the House of Geneva, Robert of Geneva, died, and the county passed to the House of Thoire-Villars before being sold to the House of Savoy in 1401., However, the castle and its district remained the property of the Dowager Countess of Geneva, Matilda of Auvergne, and later passed to her daughter, Blanche of Geneva. The estate entered the Savoyard comital domain only on 11 January 1417, following the purchase of the rights held by Matilda of Savoy (1390–1438), Lady of Rumilly and heiress of Blanche of Geneva.

When the ducal family and the Savoy court took up residence at the Château de Rumilly in September 1418, the ducal children—Amadeus and Louis, together with their sisters Marie and Bonne—were sent with their household staff to La Balme because of unsatisfactory sanitary conditions in the Albanais region. They remained there until the end of the month.

Beginning in the early 1430s, the Count of Savoy restored a degree of autonomy to the former County of Geneva by creating a new appanage, the County of Genevois, for his younger son. However, the new count, Janus of Savoy, preferred the castles of Annecy and Duingt to La Balme. This neglect led to the gradual ruin of the site.

During this final period, the castle continued to serve as the administrative centre of the castellany and housed its prison.

From 1407 to 1409, the castle hosted the future saint Colette of Corbie.,

=== Possession by the Genevois-Nemours and destruction of the castle ===
In the following century, the castle and its district passed to a cadet branch of the House of Savoy, the Genevois-Nemours, appanage counts of Genevois.

In 1691, the lordship of La Balme was elevated to the status of a county. However, the castle received little attention from its new lords, the Reydet de Choisy family. By the following century, it appears to have fallen completely into ruin.

== Description of the Château de La Balme ==
Although it is often described as or referred to as a castle, the site appears to have been more accurately a fortified house. Information preserved in the castellany accounts provides details about some of its features.

Following the fire of 1370, the roof was rebuilt., No fewer than 10,000 wooden shingles were purchased for the repairs. This roofing material was more sophisticated than the thatched roofs of ordinary houses, but was equally flammable. The tower itself was covered with a tiled roof.

The castle also contained a chapel.

== Château de La Bâtie ==
The Château de La Bâtie was a bâtie erected on high ground to the north-west of La Balme, overlooking the present artificial lake of La Balme, and controlling an important road junction during the Middle Ages.

François Mugnier described the site as follows:

The castle stood on a plateau naturally isolated on three sides and separated on the south by an artificial ditch. The plateau, approximately fifty metres above the lower level of the valley, did not rise above the surrounding land to the south-west and west-northwest.

The site is mentioned around 1308 under the form Bastie and again in 1368 as ville Bastie.

The castle has disappeared entirely. The ground on which it stood was levelled for agricultural use and was very likely quarried for building stone.

== Fortified House of Dalmaz ==
=== Toponymy ===
The name Dalmaz appears in medieval documents under various forms, including Dalma, Darmaz, Darma, and Dalmat. Beyond a local legend claiming that the name derives from a Sultan of Damascus captured during the Crusades by a member of the Dalmaz family, no source allows the origin of the name to be determined, nor whether the family gave its name to the fortified house or vice versa.

=== History ===
The building was constructed by the Counts of Geneva to complete the defensive system, most likely at the end of the 13th century or the beginning of the 14th century. The first specific mention dates to the late 14th century, when a nobleman named Pierre de Dalmaz is said to have lived in La Balme. This family appears to have owned the seigneury of Dalmaz until the 18th century. The estate then passed to the Rubelin family, who were not of noble birth, and remained in their possession until the occupation of the Duchy of Savoy in 1792. In the 19th century, the castle was divided among several farming families.

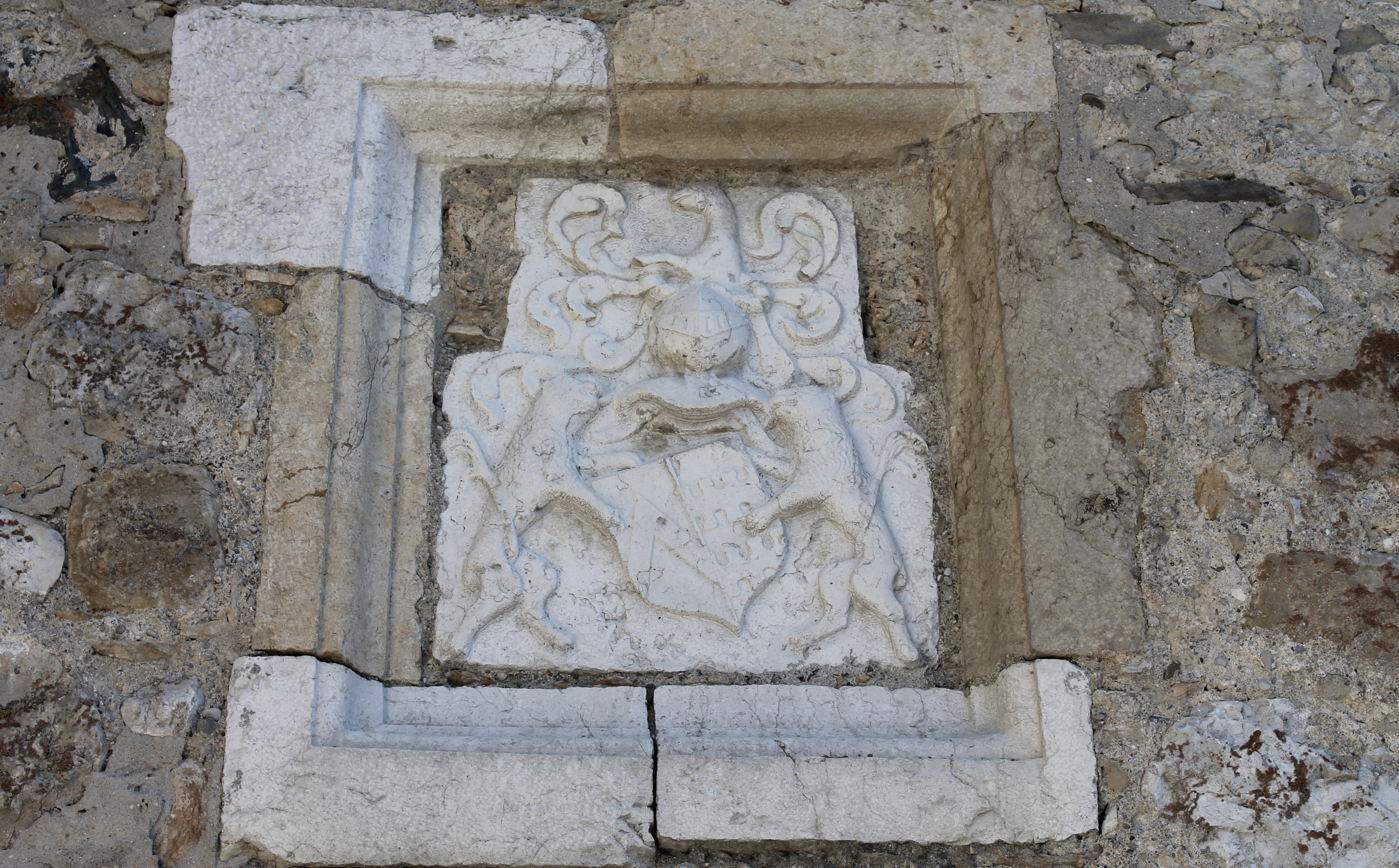
Dalmaz fortified house (13th–14th century), doorway surmounted by a coat of arms: per pale: dexter vert, two wavy fesses argent; sinister gules, a chevron argent (arms of Charles-François de Dalmaz, 16th century).

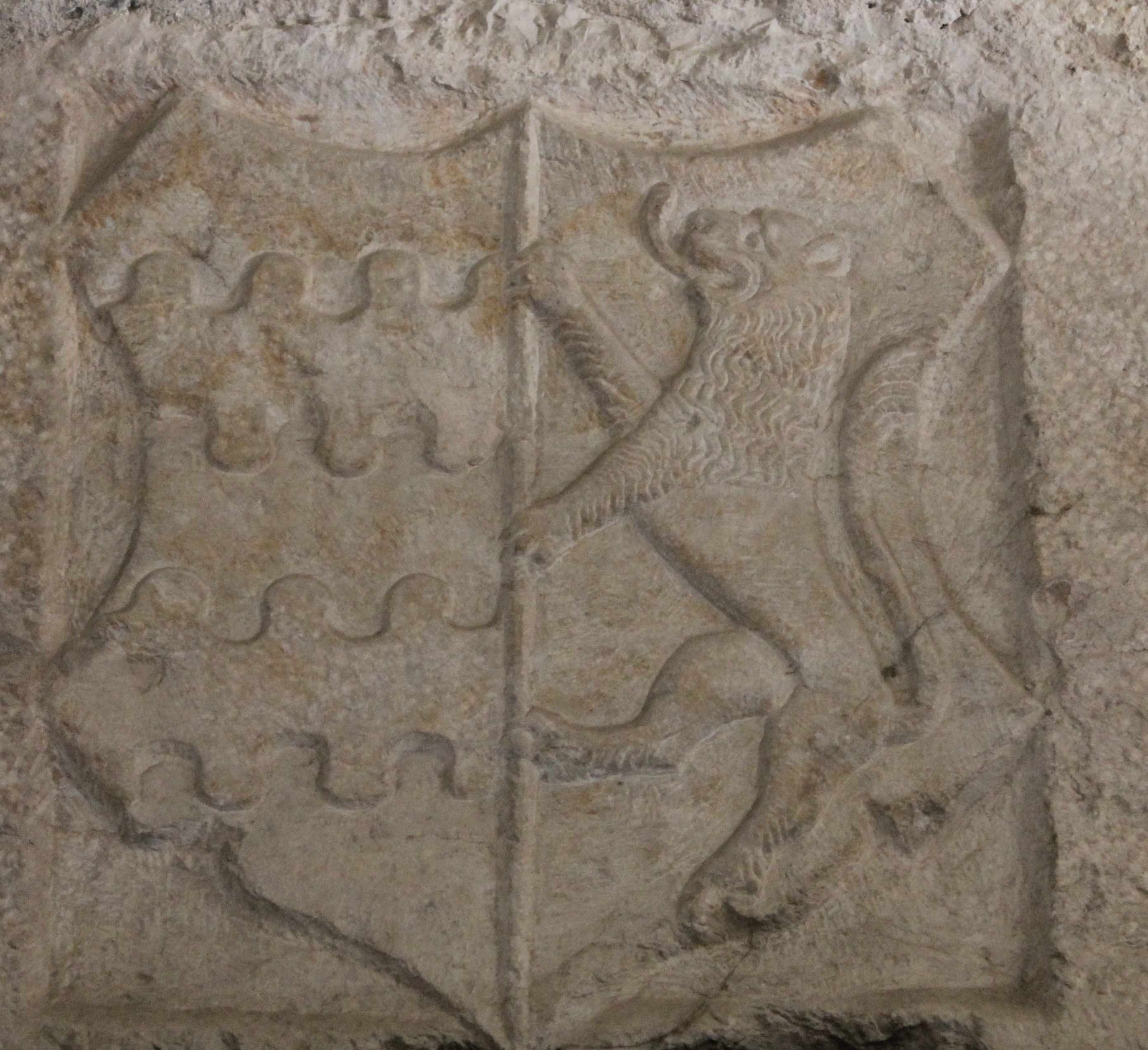
Dalmaz fortified house (13th–14th century), coat of arms above a cellar entrance: per pale, sinister gules, a lion argent (the arms of the House of Angeville); dexter vert, a wavy fess argent (the arms of the Beaufort family (Savoy) (August 2018).

The building was constructed by the Counts of Geneva to complete the defensive system, likely toward the end of the 13th century or the beginning of the 14th century. The first specific mention dates to the late 14th century, when a nobleman named Pierre de Dalmaz is said to have lived in La Balme. This family appears to have owned the seigneury of Dalmaz until the 18th century. The estate then passed to the Rubelin family, who were not of noble birth, and remained in their possession until the occupation of the Duchy of Savoy in 1792. In the 19th century, the castle was divided among several farming families.

Over the past century, the castle has suffered three fires (July 1865, 1906, December 1985).

=== Description ===
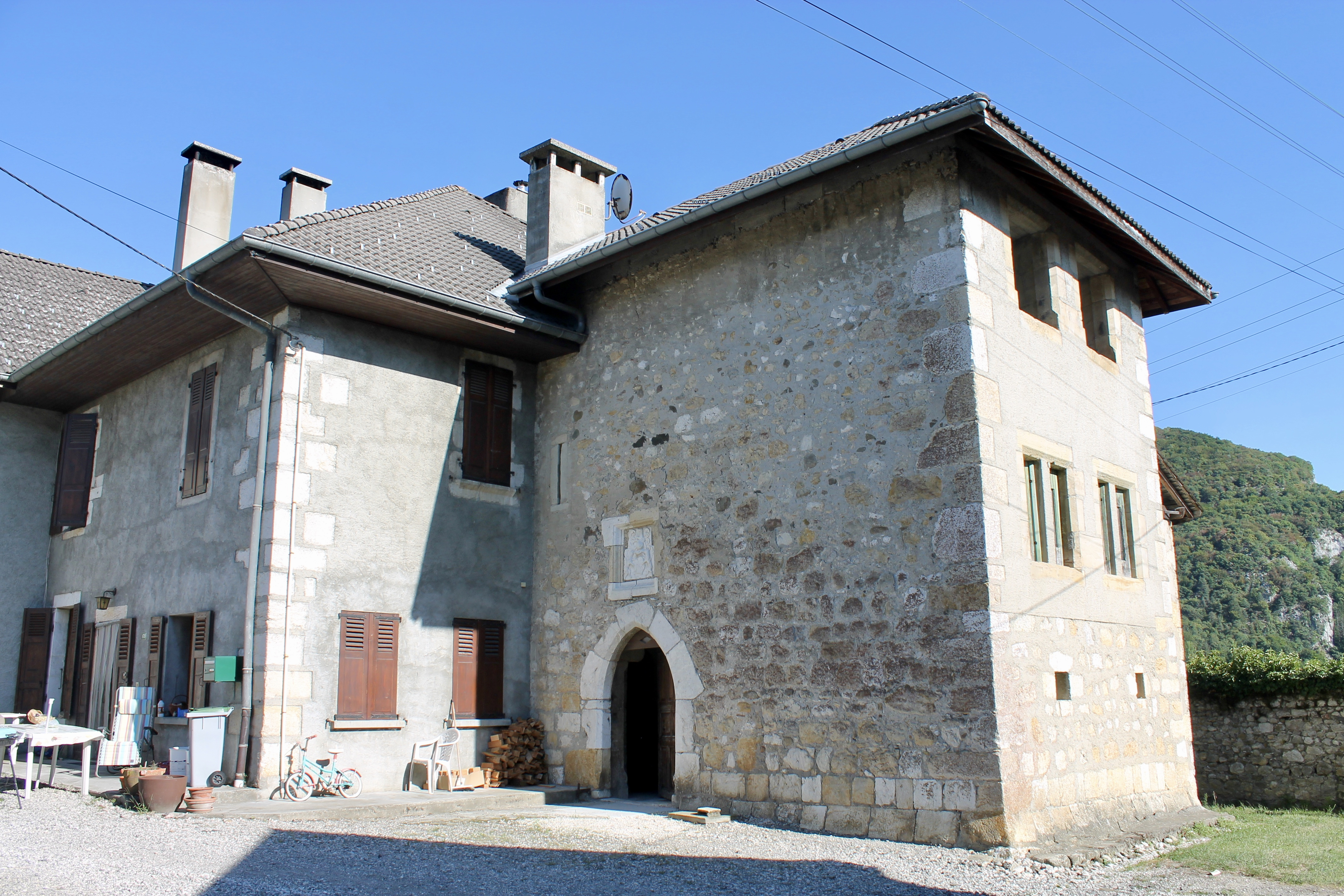
Main residential building and stair tower.

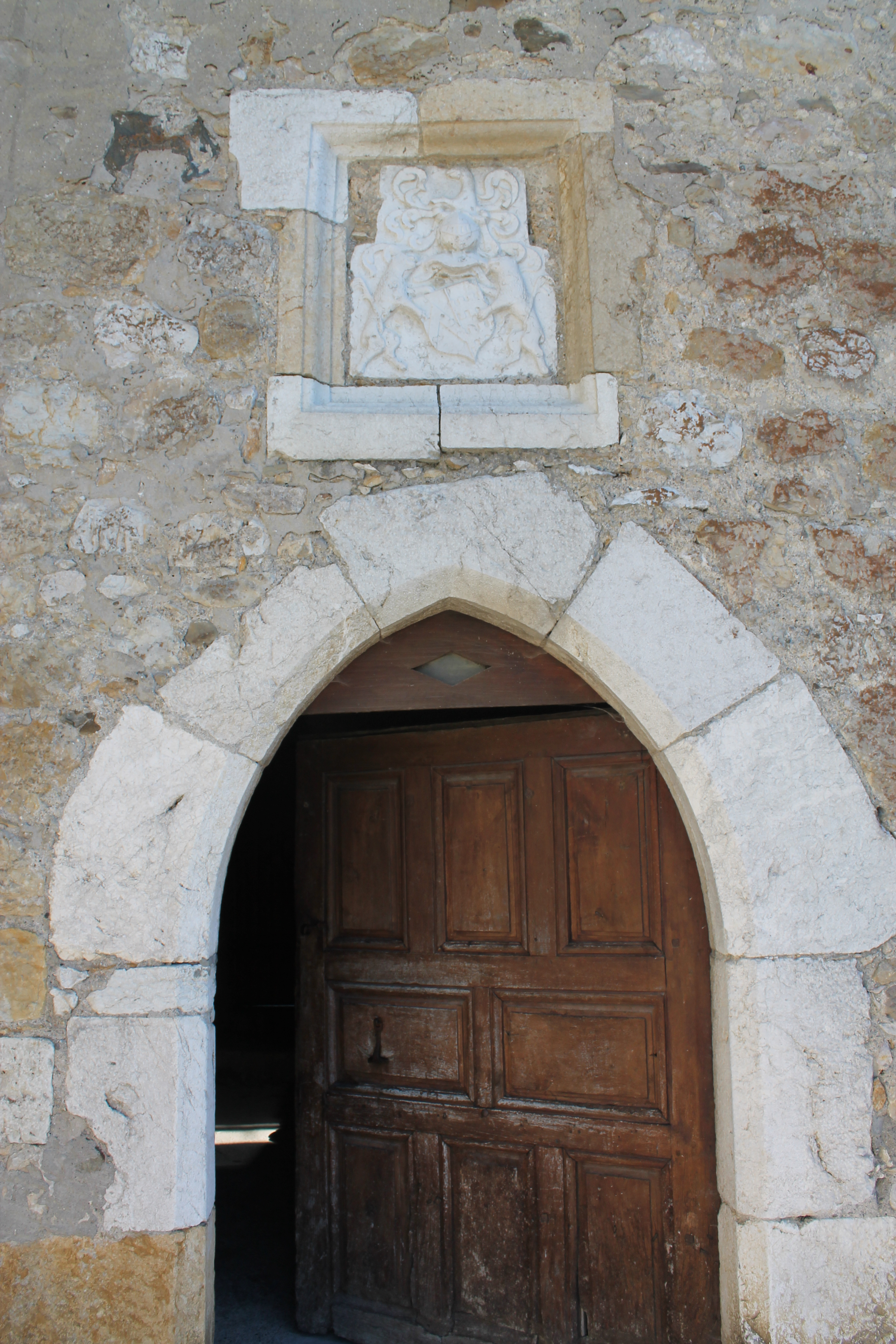
Doorway surmounted by the arms of the Dalmaz family (16th century).

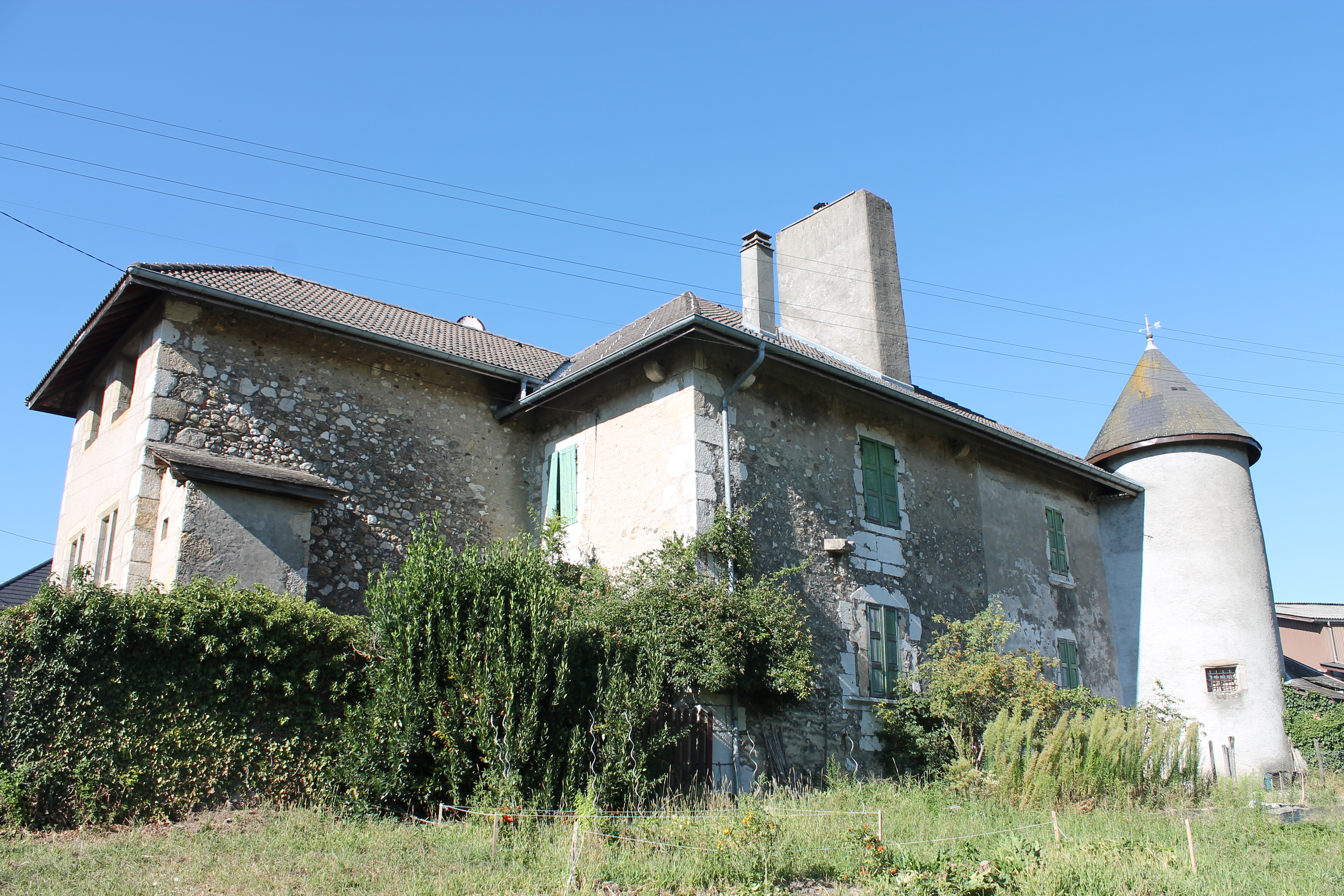
Stair tower (left) and round tower (right), south façade.

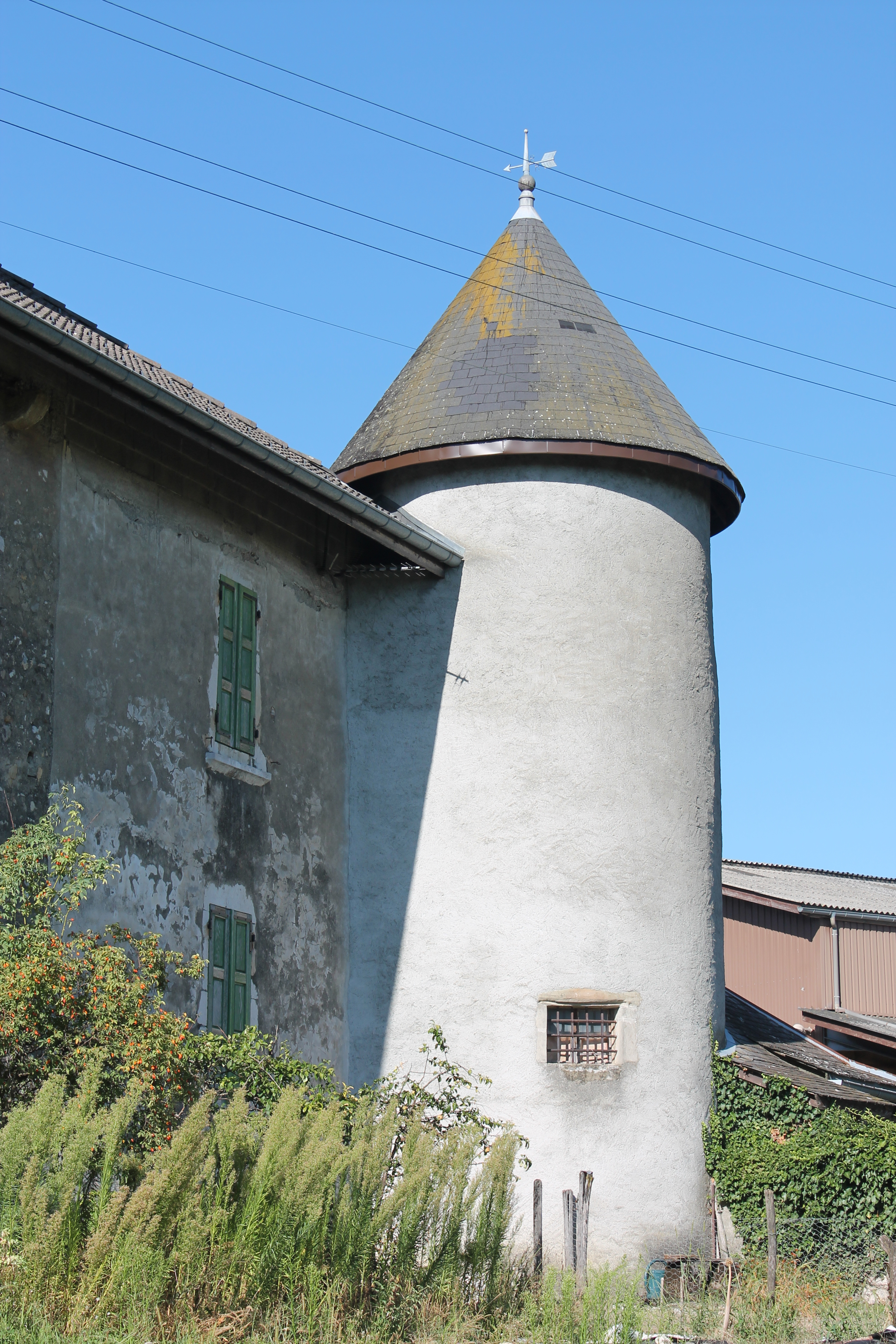
Round tower.

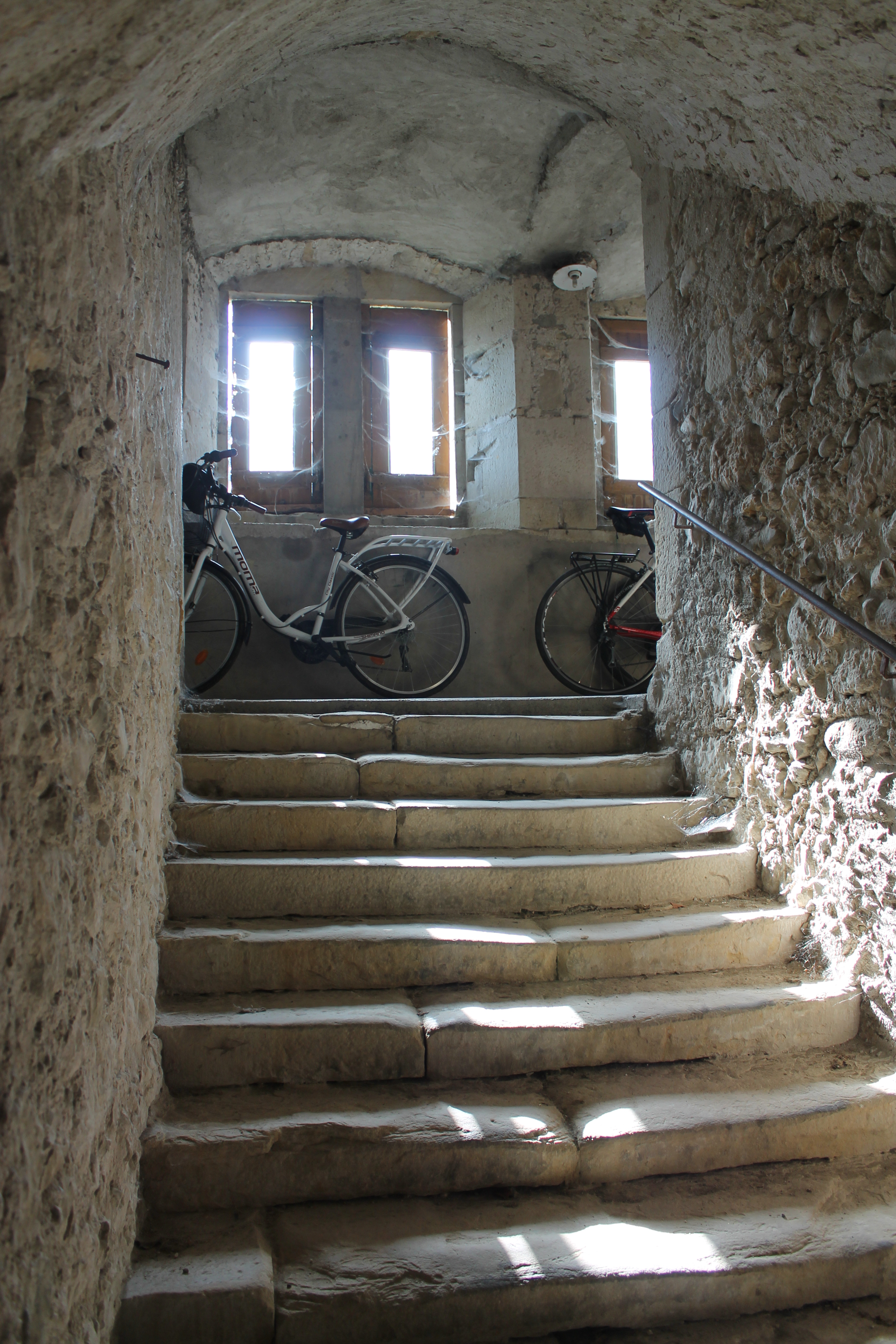
Italian Renaissance staircase.

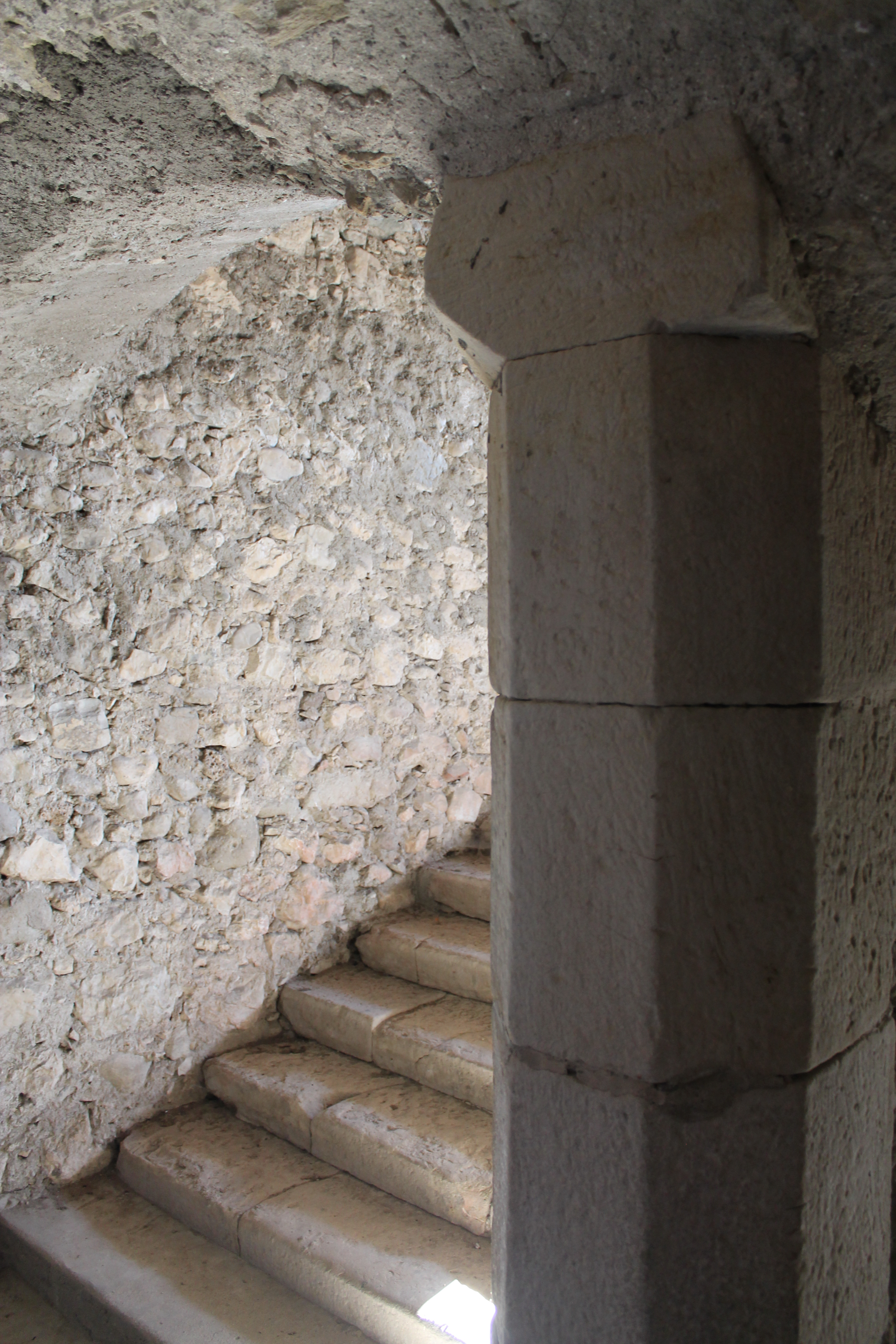
Italian Renaissance staircase.

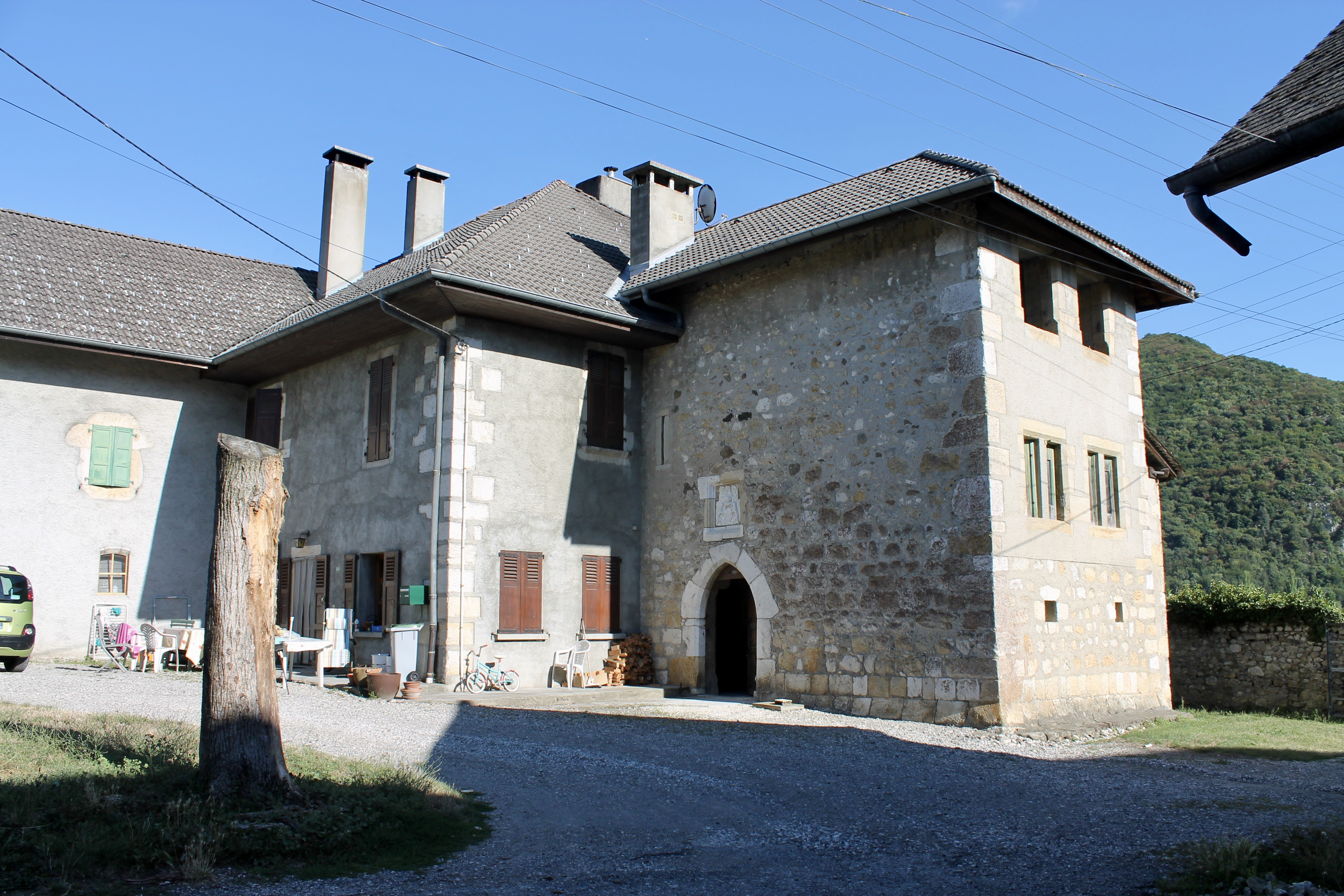
Main residential building and stair tower, north façade.

Dalmaz Castle is a fortified house situated on the heights opposite La Bâtie, northeast of La Balme, in a position that also allowed control of the route linking Annecy and Geneva, as well as a secondary road leading to Cruseilles.

Of the original castle, the residential building, an Italian Renaissance staircase, and a tower have survived.

== Castellany of La Balme and La Bâtie ==
The Château de La Balme was the seat of a castellany, also known as a mandement (mandamentum), called the Castellany of La Balme and La Bâtie (La Bâtie et La Balme). More specifically, it was a comital castellany directly dependent on the Counts of Geneva.

In the County of Geneva, the count’s castellan was appointed by the count and held extensive powers., With the county’s incorporation into the County of Savoy in 1401, the castellan became an “[official] appointed for a fixed term, subject to revocation and removal”., He was responsible for managing the castellany or mandement, collecting tax revenues from the estate, and oversaw the maintenance of the castle. The castellan was sometimes assisted by an accountant, who drafted “in final form [...] the annual report submitted by the castellan or his lieutenant”. Sometimes the castellan was assisted by an accountant, who drafted “in final form [...] the annual report submitted by the castellan or his lieutenant”.

== See also ==
- Medieval fortification
- Castle
- Fortification

== Bibliography ==
- Louis Blondel (1956). Châteaux de l'ancien diocèse de Genève [Castles of the Former Diocese of Geneva]. Mémoires et documents (in French). Vol. 7. Société d'histoire et d'archéologie de Genève. p. 486. Châteaux de l'ancien diocèse de Genève 1956.
- Georges Chapier (1961). Châteaux savoyards [Savoyard Castles] (in French). Vol. 5. Grenoble: Éditions Revue Les Alpes. p. 410. Châteaux savoyards 1961.
- Lullin, Paul; Le Fort, Charles (1866). Régeste genevois [Genevan Regesta] (in French). Société d'histoire et d'archéologie de Genève. p. 542.
- François Mugnier (1891). Comptes de la châtellenie de La Balme en Genevois et extraits de comptes des châtellenies de St-Genis, Seyssel et Chaumont [Accounts of the Castellany of La Balme in Genevois and Extracts from the Castellanies of Saint-Genis, Seyssel and Chaumont] (in French). Chambéry: Imprimerie Ménard. p. 104. Mugnier 1891.
- Nicolas Payraud (2009). "Châteaux, espace et société en Dauphiné et en Savoie du milieu du XIIIe à la fin du XVe siècle" [Castles, Space and Society in Dauphiné and Savoy from the Mid-13th to the End of the 15th Century] (PDF). HAL – Archives ouvertes (tel-00998263). Payraud 2009.

Extract from the author's doctoral dissertation in history supervised by Étienne Hubert at Lumière University Lyon 2
