= Château de Cruseilles =

Former castle in French

- Interactive map of Château de Cruseilles
- Location: Country: France; Former provinces of the Duchy of Savoy: Geneva; Region: Auvergne-Rhône-Alpes; Department: Haute-Savoie; Municipality: Cruseilles
- Coordinates: 46°02′12″N 6°06′17″E (Note: Coordinates found on Géoportail.)
- Type: Castle
- Beginning date: 12th century

The Château de Cruseilles is a former castle, probably dating from the 13th century and now in ruins, located in the commune of Cruseilles in the department of Haute-Savoie, in the Auvergne–Rhône-Alpes region.

== Location ==
The Château de Cruseilles belonged to the County of Geneva and was situated along the road linking Geneva to Annecy. Located after the Mont Sion pass when coming from Geneva, it preceded the crossings of the Usses and the Caille. A secondary route along the southern slope of the Salève, passing through Le Sappey and Vovray-en-Bornes, connected the area to the Arve Valley and the Château de Mornex. The settlement defended by the castle had three gates: one on the Geneva side, one on the Annecy side to the southeast, and a southern gate known as the Corbet gate; a postern may also have existed on the road to Ronzier.

The present-day Rue du Corbet provided access to the castle.

The site is associated with the fortified house of Pontverre, described as the “little castle” of the nobles of Cruseilles. This structure, now disappeared, was located below the Château de Cruseilles on the right bank of the Usses.

== History ==
According to Marc Le Roux (1854–1933), curator of the Musée d’Annecy, the structure was likely built in the 13th century.

In his will, Count Amadeus II of Geneva granted his wife, Agnes of Châlons, the usufruct of the castles and châtellenies of Annecy, Clermont, Chaumont, La Bâtie, and La Balme de Sillingy, along with a dowry of 5,000 livres tournois secured by the estates of Cruseilles and Hauteville.

From 1402 onward, Cruseilles, like the County of Geneva, became part of the domain of the House of Savoy.

In 1563, although already in decline, the site was used as a prison. In 1590, Spanish troops briefly took refuge there during the town's sack.

By the time the cadastre of the Duchy of Savoy was compiled, only a square tower of the castle remained.

== Description ==
In 1865, only a single tower of the former castle remained. Baron Achille Raverat (1812–1890) noted that it was inhabited at the time and contained a vaulted room. He also reported the presence of surrounding architectural remains, including remnants of buildings, sections of ramparts, and the entrance gate. The pointed arch of the gate bore a carved cross and the arms of Savoy.

The castle had a chapel (capella castri) dedicated to Saint Agatha, attested between 1371 and 1373. Three chaplaincies were recorded at the beginning of the 15th century during a pastoral visit.

== Châtellenie of Cruseilles ==
The Château de Cruseilles was the seat of a châtellenie, also called a mandement (mandamentum). It functioned as a comital châtellenie, directly dependent on the Count of Geneva. In the 12th century, authority in Cruseilles was shared between the count and a vidomne (or viscount, vice dominus), with individuals recorded around 1160 (Guillaume), 1179 (Humbert), and 1282 (Johannet). During the 13th century, the hereditary office of vidomne was replaced by a châtelain appointed directly by the count.

In the 17th century, the arms of the mandement of Cruseilles were blazoned as a silver scallop on a red field.

The châtelain was an officer appointed for a fixed term, revocable and removable, responsible for administering the châtellenie, collecting fiscal revenues, and maintaining the castle. The châtelain was occasionally assisted by a receiver of accounts, who prepared the annual report submitted by the châtelain or his deputy.

Châtelains of Cruseilles, 14th to 16th Century
Genevan Administration

The châtellenie regularly served as an apanage for members of the House of Geneva. Thus, Guy, the seventh son of Count William II of Geneva, future Bishop of Langres (1266–1291), inherited the mandement. (Note: The authors of Histoire des communes savoyardes confuse him with Guy, who died in 1294, son of Raoul of Geneva.) It also formed part of the dower of Countess Agnes of Châlons. Finally, it was a possession of the last count, the antipope Robert of Geneva (1342–1394).

- 1 May 1370 – 14 September 1371: Richard de Virieux the younger, for Cardinal Robert of Geneva
- May 1371 – 14 September 1371: Squire Richard de Virieux the younger
- 14 September 1371 – 2 July 1378: Squire Jean de Lucinge
- 2 July 1378 – 7 May 1398: Squire Richard de Virieux

Savoyard Administration

In 1402, it entered the Savoyard domain.

- 24 April 1402 – 8 January 1405: Noble Richard de Virieux
- 8 January 1405 – 8 January 1411: Noble Aymon, son and heir of Richard de Virieux
- 8 January 1411 – 8 January 1417: Noble Dame Peronette, widow of Squire Richard de Virieux
- 8 January 1417 – 8 January 1427: Noble Aymon de Virieux, son and heir of Peronette de Virieux
- 8 January 1427 – 21 January 1451: Noble Ame (Amed) de Virieux, Guillaume, and Jean, brothers, sons and heirs of Noble Aymon de Virieux
- 21 January 1451 – 21 January 1473: Guillaume (master of the household of the Duke of Savoy), Aymon, and Jacques, sons of Squire Amed de Virieux; Jean, Jacques, and Guillaume (until 1467), sons of Noble Jean de Virieux
- 21 January 1474 – 21 January 1480: Noble Jacques, son of Squire Amé de Virieux, son of Aymon; Jean Louis, Claude, and Aymon, sons of Noble Aymon de Virieux; and Jean and Jacques, sons of Jean de Virieux
- 21 January 1481 – 21 January 1483: the sons and heirs of Noble Ame de Viry, Aymon, Louis, and Jacques, lords of Viry (Note: The surname de Viriaco found in the charters is sometimes rendered as de Viry or de Virieu(x), which has caused some confusion.)
- 21 January 1484 – 21 January 1512: the sons and heirs of Noble Amed, Aymon (until 1510), Guillaume, and Jean de Virieux
- 21 January 1512 – 21 January 1515: sons and heirs of Noble Amed and Jean de Virieux

Administration of the apanage of Genevois (1502–1659)

- 1516–1517: Noble Nicolas Du Chastel
- 1517–1518: Noble Louis Provane
- 1520–1522: Noble Louis Provane
- 1527–1532: Noble Nicolas Du Chastel
- 1530–1534: Noble Catherin Dulcis
- 1535–1544: Noble Philippe Ducrest
- 1544–1547: Squire Aymé Cartier
- 1550–1553: Noble Jacques Parvi
- 1553–1556: Squire Aymé Cartier
- 1555–1559: Master (Note: Master is a title associated with “procurators, notaries, practitioners, and commissioners.”) Louis Després
- 1565–1568: Noble Étienne Dulcis
  - 1565: Noble Pierre de La Palud, châtelain for judicial matters
- 1571–1577: Master Aymé de Malbuisson
- 1577–1580: Master François Ducrest
- 1580–1586: Master Étienne Mouthon
- 1586–1592: Master Jacques Du Chastel
- 1592–1598: Master Claude Paris
- 1598–1604: Master François Fusier
- 1604–1610: Master Claude Paris
- 1610–1616: Masters Guillaume Pellarin and Antoine Vassal, co-farmers
- 1616–1622: Master Guillaume Pellarin, associated with Master Charles-Melchior Viollet by deed of 6 December 1616
- 1622–1628: Master François Galley
- 1628–1634: Master Claude Dulcis
- 1634–1640: Noble François Quimier
- 1640–1646: Master Louis-Philippe Joly
- 1646–1652: Master Jean-Jacques Bosson, who subrogated the office to Master Louis-Philippe Joly from 1647 to 1652
- 1652–1658: Masters Claude Dulcis and Benoît La Baume
- 1658–1659: Master René Saget, who handed the office over to Master Benoît La Baume

== See also ==
- Medieval fortification
- Castle
- Fortification

== Bibliography ==
- Baud, Henri; Mariotte, Jean-Yves; Challamel, Jean-Bernard (1981). Histoire des communes savoyardes. Le Genevois et Lac d'Annecy [History of the Savoyard municipalities. The Genevois region and Lake Annecy] (in French). Vol. III. Roanne: Éditions Horvath. pp. 251–261–154. ISBN 2-7171-0200-0.
- Blondel, Louis (1978). Châteaux de l'ancien diocèse de Genève [Castles of the former diocese of Geneva] (in French). Vol. 7. Société d'histoire et d'archéologie de Genève. p. 84.
- Chapier, Georges (2005). Châteaux Savoyards : Faucigny, Chablais, Tarentaise, Maurienne, Savoie propre, Genevois [Savoyard castles: Faucigny, Chablais, Tarentaise, Maurienne, Savoie propre, Genevois]. L'amateur Averti (in French). La Découvrance. pp. 35–38. ISBN 978-2-84265-326-2.
- Chapier, Georges (1961). Châteaux savoyards : Faucigny et Chablais [Savoyard castles: Faucigny and Chablais]. L'amateur Averti (in French). Vol. 5. Grenoble: Éditions Revue Les Alpes. p. 219.

=== Archival collections ===
- "Inventaire-Index des comptes de châtellenies et de subsides (conservés aux Archives départementales de la Savoie et de la Haute-Savoie) Série SA" [Inventory-Index of accounts of castellanies and subsidies (held at the Departmental Archives of Savoie and Haute-Savoie) Series SA] (PDF) (in French). pp. 276–288.
