= Canton of Annecy-1 =

Coordinates: 45.91°N 6.12°E

The canton of Annecy-1 is an administrative division of the Haute-Savoie department, southeastern France. It was created at the French canton reorganisation which came into effect in March 2015. Its seat is in Annecy.

It consists of the following communes:

1. Annecy (partly)
2. La Balme-de-Sillingy
3. Choisy
4. Lovagny
5. Mésigny
6. Nonglard
7. Poisy
8. Sallenôves
9. Sillingy
