= La Balme-de-Sillingy =

- Commune
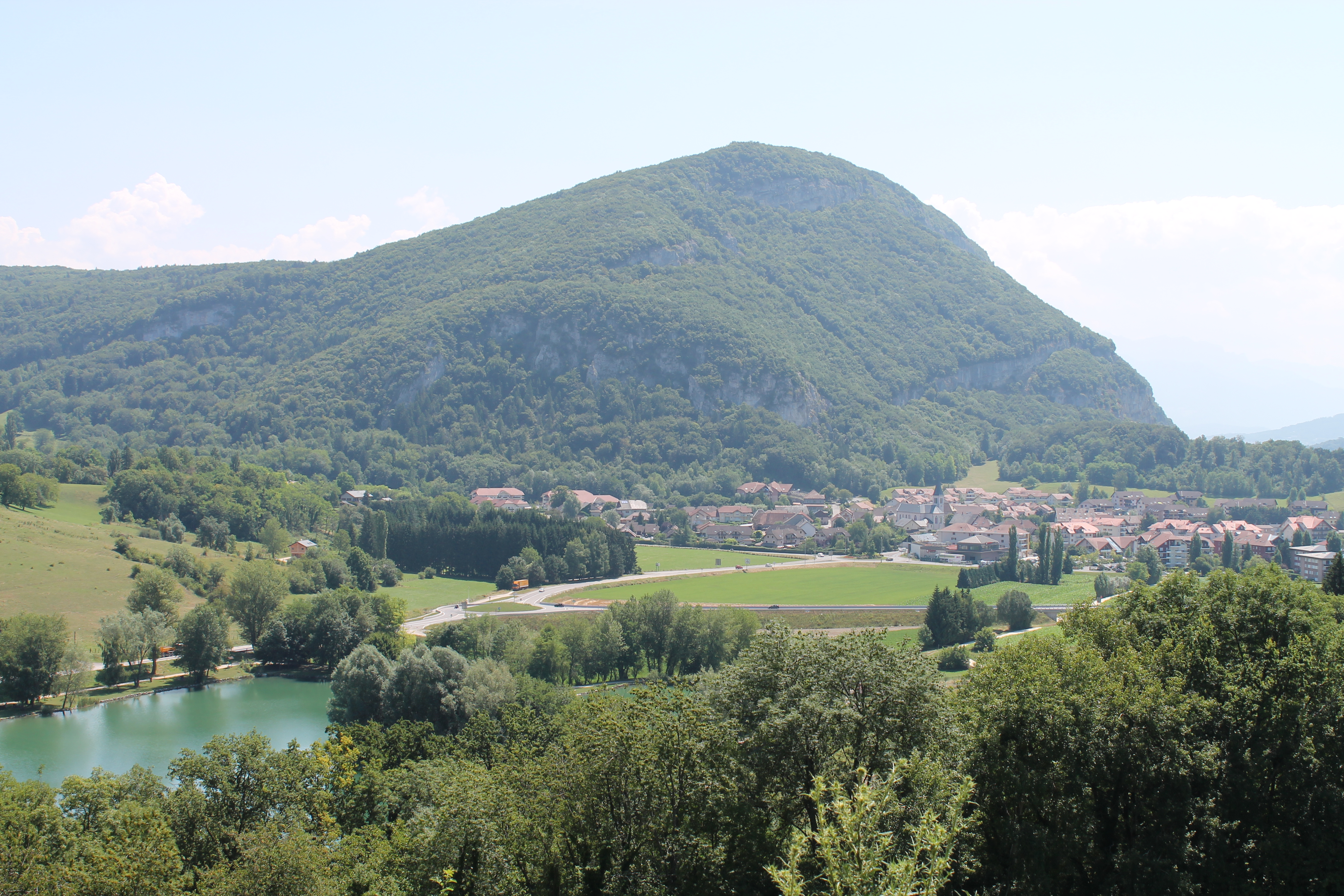
- A view of La Balme-de-Sillingy from the hamlet of La Batie

- Coat of arms
- Location of La Balme-de-Sillingy
- Location within France Location within Auvergne-Rhône-Alpes
- Coordinates: 45°57′43″N 6°02′34″E
- Country: France
- Region: Auvergne-Rhône-Alpes
- Department: Haute-Savoie
- Arrondissement: Annecy
- Canton: Annecy-1
- Intercommunality: CC Fier et Usses

Government
  - Mayor (2020–2026): Séverine Mugnier
- Area^{1}: 16.51 km^{2} (6.37 sq mi)
- Highest elevation: 590 m (1,940 ft)
- Lowest elevation: 470 m (1,540 ft)
- Population (2023): 5,336
  - Density: 323.2/km^{2} (837.1/sq mi)
- Demonym: Balméens
- Time zone: UTC+01:00 (CET)
  - Summer (DST): UTC+02:00 (CEST)
- INSEE/Postal code: 74026 /74330
- ^{1} French Land Register data, which excludes lakes, ponds, glaciers > 1 km^{2} (0.386 sq mi or 247 acres) and river estuaries.

La Balme-de-Sillingy (French pronunciation: [la balm də silɛ̃ʒi], literally La Balme of Sillingy; Arpitan: La Bârma-de-Felingi) is a commune in the Haute-Savoie department in the Auvergne-Rhône-Alpes region in south-eastern France. It is located 13 km away from Annecy and is part of the inter-communal structure Communauté de communes Fier et Usses, which comprises seven communes.

== Population ==
Historical population
Year	Pop.	±% p.a.
1968	589	—
1975	1,007	+7.96%
1982	1,940	+9.82%
1990	3,075	+5.93%
1999	3,729	+2.17%
2007	4,683	+2.89%
2012	5,015	+1.38%
2017	5,037	+0.09%
2023	5,336	+0.97%
Source: INSEE

== See also ==
- Communes of the Haute-Savoie department
