= Nonglard =

- Commune
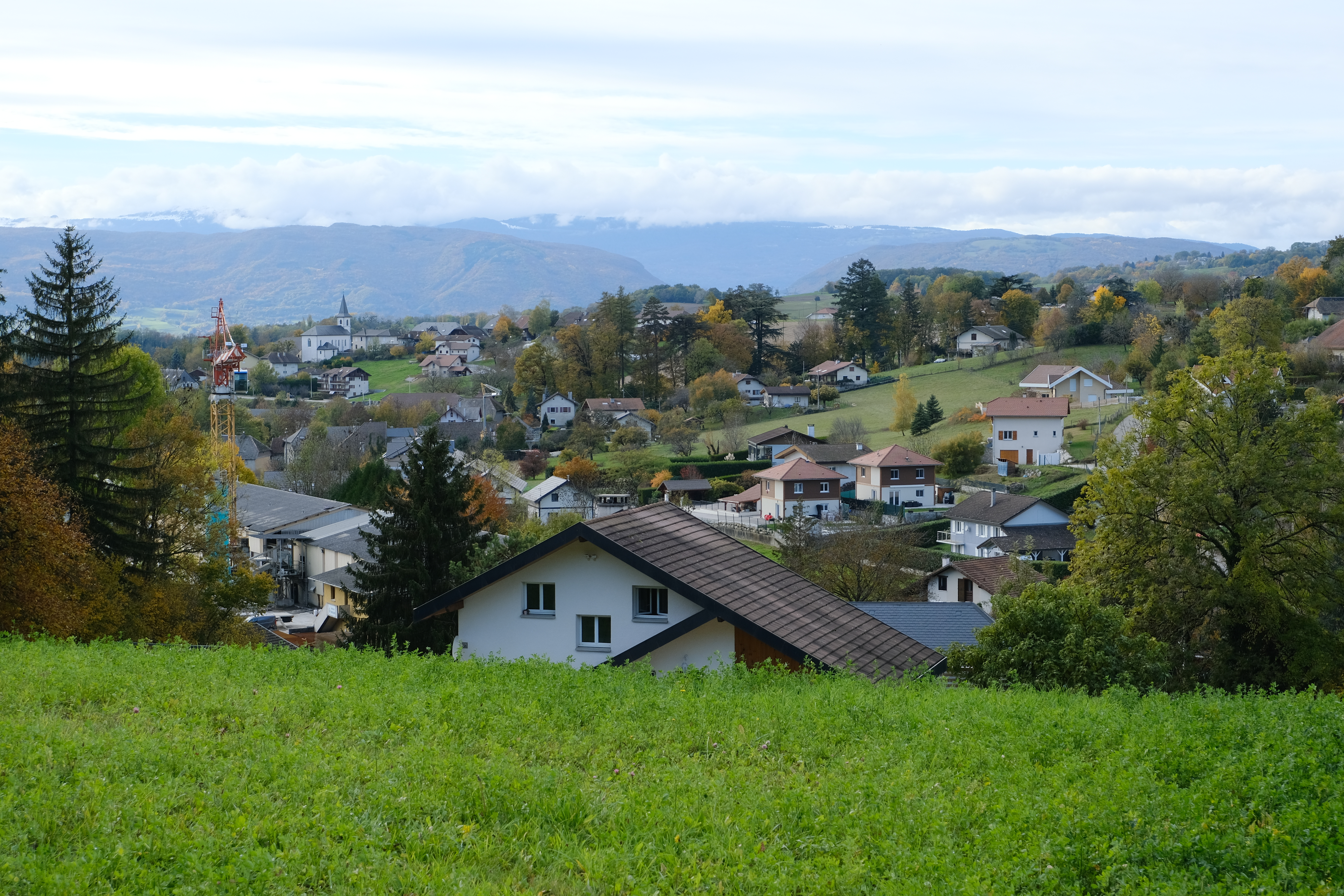
- Location of Nonglard
- Location within France Location within Auvergne-Rhône-Alpes
- Coordinates: 45°55′03″N 6°01′13″E
- Country: France
- Region: Auvergne-Rhône-Alpes
- Department: Haute-Savoie
- Arrondissement: Annecy
- Canton: Annecy-1
- Intercommunality: CC Fier et Usses

Government
  - Mayor (2020–2026): Christophe Guitton
- Area^{1}: 4.12 km^{2} (1.59 sq mi)
- Highest elevation: 600 m (2,000 ft)
- Lowest elevation: 394 m (1,293 ft)
- Population (2023): 733
  - Density: 178/km^{2} (461/sq mi)
- Demonym: Nonglardiens / Nonglardiennes
- Time zone: UTC+01:00 (CET)
  - Summer (DST): UTC+02:00 (CEST)
- INSEE/Postal code: 74202 /74330
- Website: Nonglard74.fr
- ^{1} French Land Register data, which excludes lakes, ponds, glaciers > 1 km^{2} (0.386 sq mi or 247 acres) and river estuaries.

Nonglard (French pronunciation: [nɔ̃ɡlaʁ]) is a commune in the Haute-Savoie department in the Auvergne-Rhône-Alpes region in south-eastern France.

== See also ==
- Communes of the Haute-Savoie department
