= Sallenôves =

- Commune
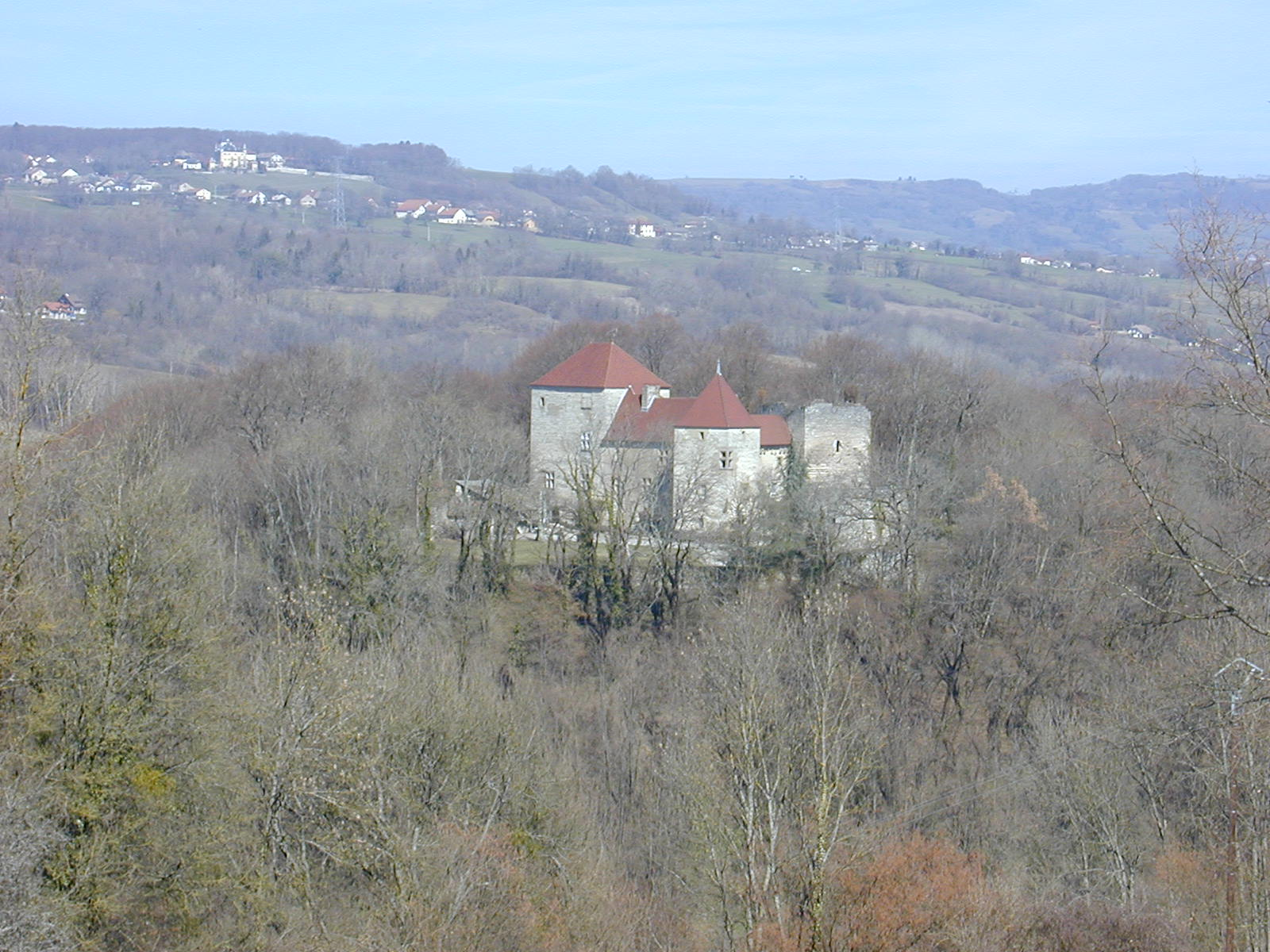
- The château of Sallenôves

- Coat of arms
- Location of Sallenôves
- Location within France Location within Auvergne-Rhône-Alpes
- Coordinates: 46°00′23″N 5°59′58″E
- Country: France
- Region: Auvergne-Rhône-Alpes
- Department: Haute-Savoie
- Arrondissement: Annecy
- Canton: Annecy-1
- Intercommunality: CC Fier et Usses

Government
  - Mayor (2020–2026): Maly Sbaffo
- Area^{1}: 3.64 km^{2} (1.41 sq mi)
- Highest elevation: 529 m (1,736 ft)
- Lowest elevation: 360 m (1,180 ft)
- Population (2023): 849
  - Density: 233/km^{2} (604/sq mi)
- Time zone: UTC+01:00 (CET)
  - Summer (DST): UTC+02:00 (CEST)
- INSEE/Postal code: 74257 /74270
- ^{1} French Land Register data, which excludes lakes, ponds, glaciers > 1 km^{2} (0.386 sq mi or 247 acres) and river estuaries.

Sallenôves (French pronunciation: [salnov]; Arpitan: Salanûva) is a commune in the Haute-Savoie department in the Auvergne-Rhône-Alpes region in south-eastern France.

== See also ==
- Communes of the Haute-Savoie department
