= Mandallaz Mountain =

Mountain in Rhône-Alpes, France

Mandallaz mountain
- Location within France

Highest point
- Elevation: 929 m (3,048 ft)
- Coordinates: 45°53′56″N 6°06′46″E

Geography
- Location: Haute-Savoie, France
- Parent range: Rhône-Alpes

Geographically, the Mandallaz Mountain is a small pre-Alpine massif 8 kilometres (5.0 mi) long by 3–4 km (1.9–2.5 mi) wide, between 500 metres (1,600 ft) and 929 metres (3,048 ft) high (the top is called "The Head"), north-west of Annecy in the Haute-Savoie department in the Rhône-Alpes region in south-eastern France. The Mandallaz has a mirror break, which provoked an earthquake in 1996.

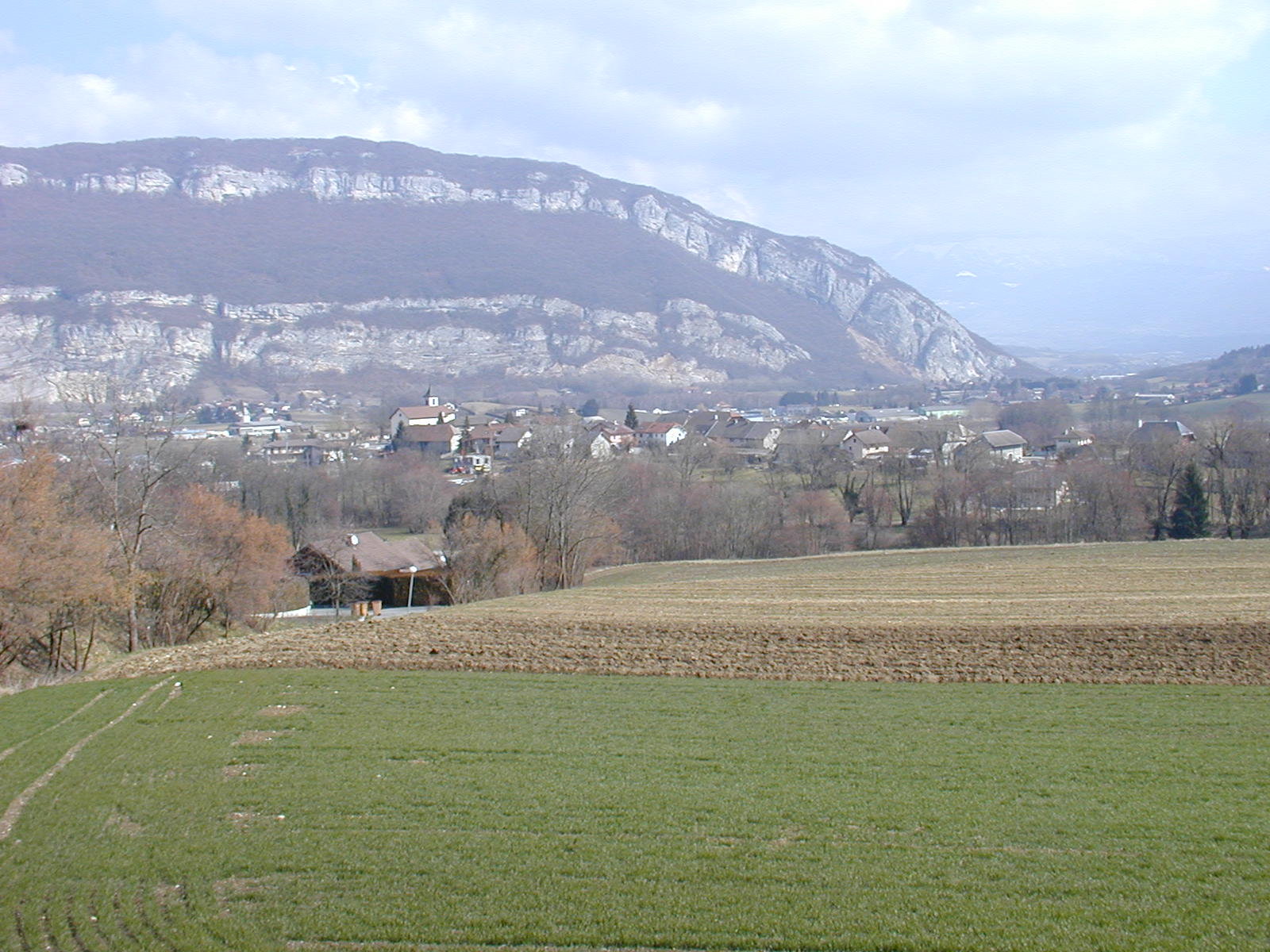
Mandallaz mountain as seen from Sillingy

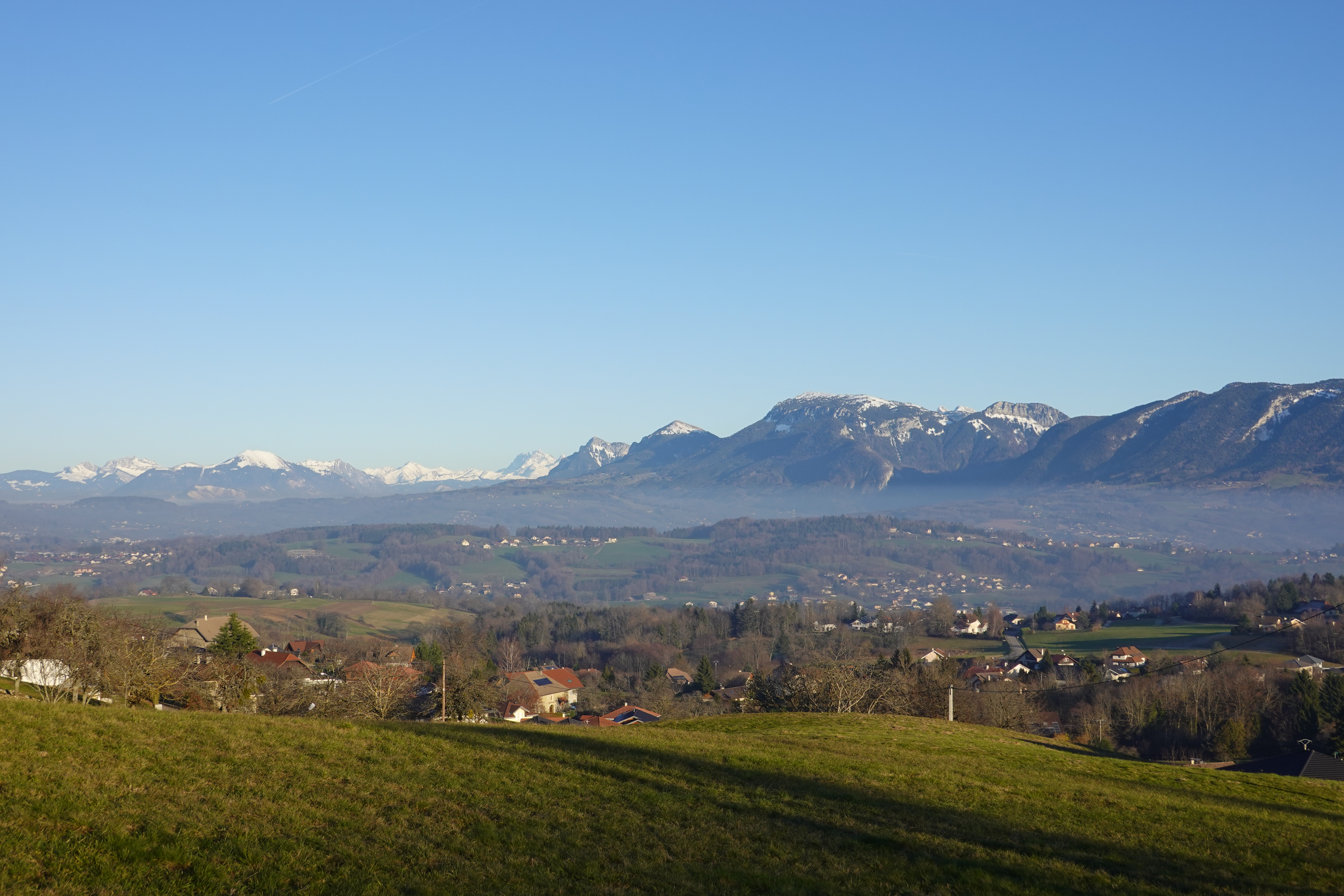
Mandallaz Mountain
