= Sillingy =

- Commune
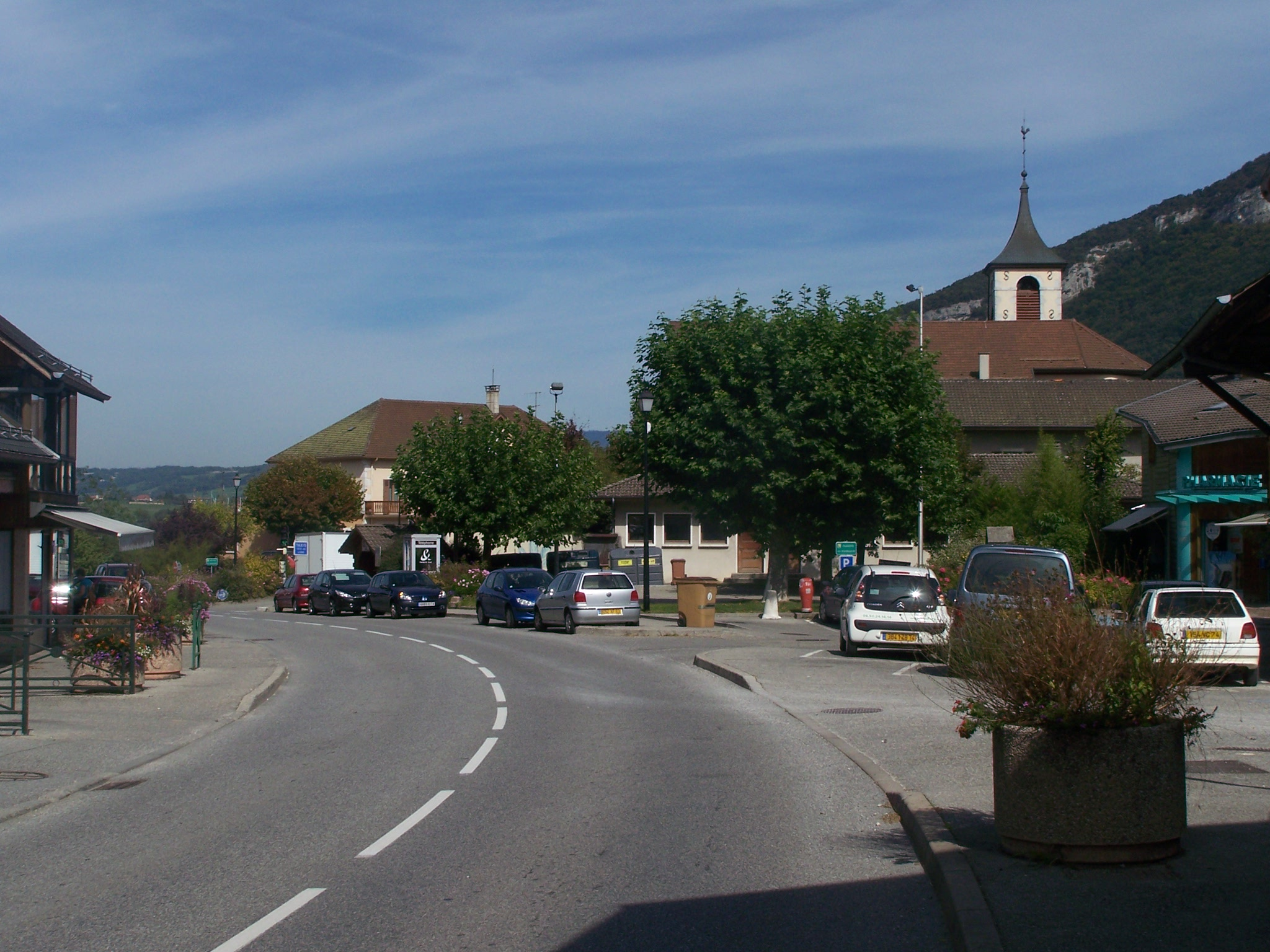
- Sight of downtown and church
- Location of Sillingy
- Location within France Location within Auvergne-Rhône-Alpes
- Coordinates: 45°57′00″N 6°02′00″E
- Country: France
- Region: Auvergne-Rhône-Alpes
- Department: Haute-Savoie
- Arrondissement: Annecy
- Canton: Annecy-1
- Intercommunality: CC Fier et Usses

Government
  - Mayor (2020–2026): Yvan Sonnerat
- Area^{1}: 14.84 km^{2} (5.73 sq mi)
- Highest elevation: 755 m (2,477 ft)
- Lowest elevation: 455 m (1,493 ft)
- Population (2023): 5,826
  - Density: 392.6/km^{2} (1,017/sq mi)
- Demonym: Sillingiens
- Time zone: UTC+01:00 (CET)
  - Summer (DST): UTC+02:00 (CEST)
- INSEE/Postal code: 74272 /74330
- Website: Sillingy74.fr
- ^{1} French Land Register data, which excludes lakes, ponds, glaciers > 1 km^{2} (0.386 sq mi or 247 acres) and river estuaries.

Sillingy (French pronunciation: [silɛ̃ʒi]; Arpitan: Felingi) is a commune in the Haute-Savoie department in the Auvergne-Rhône-Alpes region in south-eastern France.

== Population ==
Historical population
Year	Pop.	±% p.a.
1968	1,082	—
1975	1,343	+3.14%
1982	1,652	+3.00%
1990	2,116	+3.14%
1999	2,881	+3.49%
2007	3,511	+2.50%
2012	4,704	+6.02%
2017	5,245	+2.20%
2023	5,826	+1.77%
Source: INSEE

== See also ==
- Communes of the Haute-Savoie department
